= Spice 1 discography =

- Studio albums: 16
- Extended plays: 1
- Compilation albums: 11

This is the discography of Spice 1, an American rapper from Hayward, California.

== Albums ==
=== Studio albums ===
Title	Album details	Peak chart positions		Certifications
Title	Album details	US	US R&B	Certifications
Spice 1	Released: April 14, 1992; Label: Jive; Format: CD, LP, cassette, digital download	82	14	RIAA: Gold
187 He Wrote	Released: September 28, 1993; Label: Jive; Format: CD, LP, cassette, digital download	10	1	RIAA: Gold
AmeriKKKa's Nightmare	Released: November 22, 1994; Label: Jive; Format: CD, LP, cassette, digital download	22	2	RIAA: Gold
1990-Sick	Released: December 5, 1995; Label: Jive; Format: CD, LP, cassette, digital download	30	3	
The Black Bossalini	Released: October 28, 1997; Label: Jive; Format: CD, LP, cassette, digital download	28	5	
Immortalized	Released: October 12, 1999; Label: Jive; Format: CD, cassette, digital download	111	30	
The Last Dance	Released: May 16, 2000; Label: Mobb Status; Format: CD, digital download	—	54	
Spiceberg Slim	Released: June 11, 2002; Label: Riviera; Format: CD, digital download	—	79	
The Ridah	Released: June 8, 2004; Label: Independent Warrior; Format: CD, digital download	—	89	
Dyin' 2 Ball	Released: January 25, 2005; Label: Triple X; Format: CD, digital download	—	—	
The Truth	Released: October 4, 2005; Label: High Powered; Format: CD, digital download	—	—	
Haterz Nightmare	Released: June 30, 2015; Label: Thug World; Format: CD, digital download	—	—	
Throne of Game	Released: December, 2017; Label: Thug World; Format: CD, digital download	—	—	
Platinum O.G.	Released: July 26, 2019; Label: Elder; Format: CD, digital download	—	—	
This Is Thug World, Vol. 1	Released: August 14, 2020; Label: Thug World; Format: CD, digital download	—	—	
Platinum O.G. 2	Released: May 3, 2024; Label: Elder; Format: CD, digital download	—	—	

=== Collaborative albums ===
Title	Album details	Peak chart positions	
Title	Album details	US	US R&B
Criminal Activity (with Celly Cel as Criminalz)	Released: August 7, 2001; Label: Realside; Format: CD, cassette	—	57
NTA: National Thug Association (with Bad Boy)	Released: August 19, 2003; Label: Murder Creek; Format: CD	—	—
The Pioneers (with MC Eiht)	Released: June 29, 2004; Label: Real Talk; Format: CD	—	71
Keep It Gangsta (with MC Eiht)	Released: February 21, 2006; Label: Real Talk; Format: CD	—	—
Thug Lordz Trilogy (with C-Bo and Yukmouth as Thug Lordz)	Released: 2006; Label: High Powered; Format: CD	—	—
Criminal Intent (with Jayo Felony)	Released: 2007; Label: Self-released; Format: CD	—	—
Thug Therapy (with Bossolo)	Released: March 17, 2015; Label: Bloc Hustle, Thug World; Format: CD, digital download	—	—

=== Compilation albums ===
Title	Album details	Peak chart positions	
Title	Album details	US	US R&B
Hits	Released: November 10, 1998; Label: Jive; Format: CD, cassette	—	82
The Playa Rich Project	Released: November 14, 2000; Label: Mobb Status; Format: CD	—	—
Hits II: Ganked & Gaffled	Released: February 20, 2001; Label: Mobb Status; Format: CD	—	—
The Playa Rich Project 2	Released: January 22, 2002; Label: LGB; Format: CD	—	—
Hits 3	Released: April 9, 2002; Label: Mobb Status; Format: CD	—	—
Thug Disease	Released: December 17, 2002; Label: Rap Classics; Format: CD	—	—
Bossed Out	Released: January 1, 2005; Label: Jam; Format: CD	—	—
The Thug In Me	Released: November 29, 2005; Label: Sony BMG; Format: CD	—	—
Life After Jive: 2000 to 2005	Released: April 4, 2006; Label: Real Talk; Format: CD	—	—
Thug Association	Released: May 29, 2007; Label: PR; Format: CD	—	—
Thug Reunion	Released: February 5, 2008; Label: PR; Format: CD	—	—

== Extended plays ==
Title	EP details	Peak chart positions
Title	EP details	US R&B
Let It Be Known	Released: January 22, 1991; Label: Triad; Format: CD, LP, cassette, digital download	69

== Guest appearances ==
Title	Year	Artist(s)	Album
"Spice 1 Wit Da Banksta"	1993	Ant Banks (feat. Spice 1)	Sittin' on Somethin' Phat
"Nigga Gots No Heart"	1993	Spice 1	Menace II Society (soundtrack)
"The Dangerous Crew"	1993	Too Short (feat. Spice 1, Ant Banks, Mhisani and Pee-Wee)	Get in Where You Fit In
"2 Kill a G"	1994	Ant Banks (feat. Spice 1 and Too Short)	The Big Badass
"Gangsta Team"	1994	South Central Cartel (feat. MC Eiht, Ice-T, Spice 1 and 2Pac)	'N Gatz We Truss
"Nuthin' but the Gangsta"	1994	MC Eiht (feat. Spice 1 and Redman)	We Come Strapped
"Nigga Sings the Blues"	1994	Spice 1	Jason's Lyric (soundtrack)
"Santa Rita Weekend"	1994	The Coup (feat. E-40, Spice 1 and E-Roc)	Genocide & Juice
"No Peace"	1995	South Central Cartel (feat. Ice-T, Powerlord Jel, Spice 1, Ant Banks, Boss, Treach and Dori)	Murder Squad Nationwide
"Gun Smoke"	1995	South Central Cartel (feat. 187 Fac, Spice 1 and Big Mike)	Murder Squad Nationwide
"Pass da Dank"	1995	South Central Cartel (feat. Ant Banks, Spice 1, Dee, Mel-Low, Tre-Duce and Mr. Wesside)	Murder Squad Nationwide
"Dusted 'n' Disgusted"	1995	E-40 (feat. 2Pac, Spice 1, Mac Mall and Levitti)	In a Major Way
"Born II Die"	1995	Spice 1	Tales from the Hood (soundtrack)
"I Got 5 on It (Bay Ballas Remix)"	1995	Luniz (feat. Dru Down, E-40, Richie Rich, Shock G and Spice 1)	I Got 5 on It (single)
"Sowhatusayin"	1995	South Central Cartel, Jayo Felony, MC Eiht, Sh'killa, Spice 1 and Treach	The Show (soundtrack)
"Sound of Lead"	1995	Ant Banks (feat. Spice 1 and 187 Fac)	Do or Die
"Trouble (Scared to Blast)"	1995	Too Short, Spice 1 and J-Dubb	Don't Try This at Home
"Red Rum"	1996	Celly Cel (feat. Spice 1)	Killa Kali
"Slugs"	1996	Spice 1	Original Gangstas (soundtrack)
"Trapped in the Game"	1996	Hard Boyz (feat. Spice 1)	Trapped in the Game
"Like Playas"	1996	Young Kyoz and Spice 1	Phat Beach (soundtrack)
"Why You Wanna Funk?"	1996	Spice 1, The Click and Marcus Gore	High School High (soundtrack)
"Ring It"	1996	E-40 (feat. Spice 1, Keak da Sneak and Harm)	Tha Hall of Game
"2 Hands and a Razor"	1997	Spice 1	Dangerous Ground (soundtrack)
"West Riden'"	1997	Ant Banks (feat. King T and Spice 1)	Big Thangs
"Don't Stop"	1997	Seagram (feat. Spice 1)	Souls on Ice
"Fac Not Fiction"	1997	187 Fac (feat. Spice 1 and D tha Poet)	Fac Not Fiction
"All Head No Body"	1997	187 Fac (feat. B-Legit, Big Lurch, Gangsta P, Spice 1 and V-Dal)	Fac Not Fiction
"Gangsta Shit"	1997	5th Ward Boyz (feat. Spice 1 and Mr. Slimm)	Usual Suspects
"I'm Losin' It"	1997	2Pac (feat. Spice 1 and Big Syke)	R U Still Down? (Remember Me)
"Mob On"	1998	Paris (feat. Spice 1)	Unleashed
"Heat"	1998	Paris (feat. Jet and Spice 1)	Unleashed
"Major Pain & Mr. Bossalini"	1998	C-Bo (feat. Spice 1)	Til My Casket Drops
"Trapped (Remix)"	1998	Hard Boyz (feat. Spice 1)	Potential Murder Suspects
"360°"	1998	8Ball (feat. Rappin' 4-Tay, Spice 1, E-40 and Otis & Shug)	Lost
"Don't Wait"	1998	Devin the Dude (feat. DMG and Spice 1)	The Dude
"Wet Party"	1999	Tear Da Club Up Thugs (feat. Spice 1 and M-Child)	CrazyNDaLazDayz
"Good Girl Goes Bad"	1999	Spice 1	The Corruptor (soundtrack)
"As the World Turns"	1999	C-Bo (feat. AP.9, Spice 1 and Cherelle Fortier)	The Final Chapter
"Shook Niggas"	1999	T.W.D.Y. (feat. Spice 1, Dolla Will, MC Ant and Metro)	Derty Werk
"Mob Fashion"	1999	Mob Figaz (feat. Kaos and Spice 1)	C-Bo's Mob Figaz
"Thug World"	1999	Mob Figaz (feat. C-Bo and Spice 1)	C-Bo's Mob Figaz
"Twirk It"	1999	Big Mike (feat. Jayo Felony and Spice 1)	Hard to Hit
"Section 11350"	1999	Kokane (feat. Spice 1)	They Call Me Mr. Kane
"Wig Split"	2000	DenGee (feat. Spice 1)	DenGee Livin'
"In Yo Look"	2000	Sean T (feat. Spice 1 and Crime Boss)	Heated
"Gun Talk"	2000	Willie D (feat. Outlawz and Spice 1)	Loved by Few, Hated by Many
"Smash"	2000	Outlawz (feat. Bad Azz, Low Lives and Spice 1)	Ride wit Us or Collide wit Us
"Don't Stop"	2001	Brotha Lynch Hung and C-Bo (feat. Spice 1 and Yukmouth)	Blocc Movement
"Gang Bangin Shit"	2001	Jayo Felony (feat. Spice 1)	Crip Hop
"Mercenaries"	2002	Sean T (feat. Spice 1)	Familiar Ground
"Killa Cali"	2004	Yukmouth and C-Bo as Thug Lordz (feat. Spice 1)	In Thugz We Trust
"In the Ghetto"	2004	Trae (feat. Russell Lee, Spice 1, Yung Redd and Lil' Boss)	Same Thing Different Day
"Staying Alive"	2007	Z-Ro (feat. Spice 1)	King of tha Ghetto: Power
"Murder'ra"	2007	Z-Ro (feat. Pimp C, Spice 1 and Vicious)	King of tha Ghetto: Power
"Tell Me What U Want"	2007	Daz Dillinger (feat. Spice 1, San Quinn and Francci)	Gangsta Party
"Start a Problem"	2007	Daz Dillinger (feat. Spice 1 and Roscoe)	Gangsta Party
"Street Life"	2008	Grave Plott (feat. Spice 1)	The Plott Thickens
"The Other Day Ago"	2012	E-40 (feat. Spice 1 and Celly Cel)	The Block Brochure: Welcome to the Soil 2
