= Jayo Felony discography =

This is the discography for American hip hop musician Jayo Felony.

== Albums ==
=== Studio albums ===
List of studio albums, with selected chart positions
Title	Album details	Peak chart positions		
Title	Album details	US	US R&B	US Ind
Take a Ride	Released: October 24, 1995; Label: JMJ, RAL; Format: CD, LP, cassette, digital download	—	65	—
Whatcha Gonna Do	Released: August 25, 1998; Label: Def Jam; Format: CD, LP, cassette, digital download	46	8	—
Underground	Released: November 16, 1999; Label: Eureka; Format: CD, cassette	—	—	—
Crip Hop	Released: October 23, 2001; Label: AMC; Format: CD, digital download	—	53	10
"—" denotes a recording that did not chart.

=== Collaboration albums ===
- Criminal Activity with Criminalz (2001)
- Criminal Intent with Spice 1 (2007)

== Singles ==
=== As lead artist ===
List of singles as lead artist, with other performing artists and selected chart positions, showing year released and album name
Title	Year	Peak chart positions	Album
Title	Year	US R&B	Album
"Niggas and Bitches" (with Kevin Goins)	1994	—	Jason's Lyric soundtrack and Take a Ride
"Sherm Stick"	1995	—	Take a Ride
"Whatcha Gonna Do" (with Method Man and DMX)	1998	—	Hav Plenty soundtrack and Whatcha Gonna Do
"Nitty Gritty"	1998	101	Whatcha Gonna Do
"Hotta Than Fish Grease" (featuring Young Crook)	2000	—	Crip Hop
"True'd Up"	2001	—	Bulletproof Love, Vol. 1
"Heavyweight"	2012	—	Hood Invasion
"Horny" (featuring Sly Pyper)	2023	—	Non-album singles
"Gigantor" (featuring Sly Pyper)	2023	—	Non-album singles
"—" denotes a recording that did not chart.

=== As featured artist ===
List of singles as featured artist, with other performing artists and selected chart positions, showing year released and album name
Title	Year	Peak chart positions				Album
Title	Year	US	US R&B	US Rap	AUS	Album
"Knock on Wood (Remix)" (Murder Squad featuring The Evil Side G's, Sh'killa, Gripsta, B.G. Knocc Out, Dresta and Jayo Felony)	1995	—	—	—	—	Non-album single
"Pussy Pop" (Xzibit featuring Method Man and Jayo Felony)	1998	—	113	—	—	40 Dayz & 40 Nightz
"The Anthem" (Sway & King Tech featuring RZA, Tech N9ne, Eminem, Xzibit, Pharoahe Monch, Kool G Rap, Jayo Felony, Chino XL and Krs-One)	1999	—	91	17	—	This or That
"Big Business" (Frost featuring Xzibit and Jayo Felony)	1999	—	—	—	—	That Was Then, This Is Now, Vol. 1
"Who Ride with Us (Remix)" (Kurupt featuring Daz Dillinger, Traci Nelson, Roscoe and Jayo Felony)	2000	—	—	—	—	Non-album single
"Got Beef" (Tha Eastsidaz featuring Blaqthoven, Jayo Felony and Sylk-E. Fyne)	2000	99	55	38	23	Tha Eastsidaz
"Pop Pop" (Caz featuring L.A. Nash and Jayo Felony)	2000	—	—	—	—	Thundadome
"Let's All Roll" (Knoc-turn'al featuring Time Bomb, Butch Cassidy, Slip Capone and Jayo Felony)	2001	—	—	—	—	L.A. Confidential Presents: Knoc-turn'al
"California (Remix)" (Sly Boogy featuring Mack 10, Jayo Felony, E-40, Kurupt, Crooked I and Roscoe)	2003	—	—	—	—	Non-album single
"Smoke Dis F-N-J" (Tha Chill featuring Jayo Felony and MC Eiht)	2003	—	—	—	—	The Wind Chill Factor
"Roll Call" (Brian J featuring Suga Free, Pomona Pimpin' Young and Jayo Felony)	2020	—	—	—	—	Non-album single
"—" denotes a recording that did not chart or was not released in that territory.

=== Promotional singles ===
List of promotional singles as lead and featured artist, with other performing artists, showing year released and album name
Title	Year	Album
"The Loc Is on His Own"	1994	Take a Ride
"I'ma Keep Bangin'"	1995	Take a Ride
"Whatcha Gonna Do (Remix)" (featuring Redman, Mack 10 and WC)	1998	Whatcha Gonna Do
"Represent Dat G.C." (Kurupt featuring Daz Dillinger, Soopafly, Big Tray Deee, Jayo Felony, Snoop Dogg and Butch Cassidy)	2000	Tha Streetz Iz a Mutha
"She Loves Me" (featuring Young Nube)	2002	Crip Hop
"Show Me Some Love"	2004	Non-album single
"1, 2, 3"	2005	In the Trenches

== Guest appearances ==
List of non-single guest appearances, with other performing artists, showing year released and album name
Title	Year	Other artist(s)	Album
"Sowhatusayin"	1995	South Central Cartel, MC Eiht, Treach, Sh'killa, Spice 1	The Show soundtrack
"Zoom Zooms and Wam Wam"	1995	None	The Show soundtrack
"Young Fun"	1997	Warren G, Knee-Hi	Take a Look Over Your Shoulder
"Street 2 Street"	1997	None	How to Be a Player soundtrack
"Ghetto Politix"	1997	Kill Kill, Swoop G	Ghetto Politix
"X.O. wit' Me"	1998	Above the Law	Legends
"Who Loves Ya"	1998	None	Nationwide: Independence Day
"Money Scheme"	1998	E-40, Bosko	The Element of Surprise
"Get Ya Girl Dogg"	1998	Snoop Dogg, MC Eiht	Straight Outta Cali
"Way Too Crazy"	1998	Big Tray Deee, Daz Dillinger	Rush Hour soundtrack
"Westside Part III (Bud'da Remix)"	1998	TQ, Kam	Westside single
"Ghetto Horror Show"	1998	Mack 10, Ice Cube	The Recipe
"My Name in Yo Mouth"	1998	Money Green, Kam	S.I. Riders
"Raised in tha Hood"	1998	Volume 10, Nonstop	S.I. Riders
"8 Ball"	1998	None	Straight Outta Compton: N.W.A 10th Anniversary Tribute
"Mr. Peer Pressure"	1999	None	Organized Rhymes
"Twirk It"	1999	Big Mike, Spice 1	Hard to Hit
"Cradle to the Grave"	1999	First Born	Riders
"Masq-a-Raid"	1999	Saafir	The Hit List
"Cause I Can"	1999	E-40, C-Bo	Charlie Hustle: The Blueprint of a Self-Made Millionaire
"You Really Don't Wanna"	1999	Rappin' 4-Tay, Cell	Introduction to Mackin'
"Naw! (That's What They Won't Do)"	1999	D.B.A.	Doing Business As
"Moves You Make"	2000	Kokane, Xzibit	S.I. Riders, Vol. 2: Back in tha Hood
"The Gutter Shit"	2000	Ice Cube, Gangsta, Squeak Ru	War & Peace, Vol. 2 (The Peace Disc)
"U Can't Fuck with Me"	2000	LL Cool J, Xzibit, Snoop Dogg	G.O.A.T.
"O.G. to Me"	2000	Scarface, Tha Dogg Pound	The Last of a Dying Breed
"Extasy"	2000	Ja Rule, Caddillac Tah, Black Child	Rule 3:36
"Mad-Doggen"	2000	E-A-Ski	Bay 2 L.A.: Westside Badboys
"Ride or Die"	2000	Spice 1, Big Tray Deee, Yukmouth	The Playa Rich Project / Criminal Activity
"Riderz"	2000	Big Snake, Mac Lew	Hot Ones
"They Like Dat"	2001	Kam, Spider Loc, Dresta, Yukmouth	Kamnesia
"Kick It Tonight"	2001	D-Shot, Bosko	Money, Sex & Thugs
"Bentleys & Bitches"	2001	Da Beatminerz, Ras Kass	Brace 4 Impak
"Three Deep"	2001	Tyrant, Mr. Mash	West Next
"Still Livin'"	2001	HLE	Behind Closed Doors
"Bounce"	2001	Shaquille O'Neal, Peter Gunz	None
"Niggaz Theme Music"	2001	Lil' CS, Bay Loc	Dollars & Sins
"Playa Hataz and Bustaz"	2001	Shuga Shaft, Yukmouth	Look What the World Found
"Lucky That I'm Rappin"	2002	Spice 1	The Playa Rich Project 2 / Spiceberg Slim
"New Shit"	2002	Baby S	Street Fractions
"We Run 'Em Out"	2002	Sylk-E. Fyne	X-Files, Vol. 2
"Body Bag Them Fags"	2002	Bay Loc, Lil' Bay Loc	SD Ridaz Compilation
"Killer Kalifornia"	2002	Blaqthoven, Ill Knob, K-9, 40 Glocc	Rocks the World MC's
"Scary Flicc"	2003	Caviar, Kokane, Big Tray Deee	Hard White
"Ta Get the Message Press Rewind"	2003	H-Hustla, Manish	The New Dope on the Street
"We Pop (West Coast Remix)"	2003	RZA, E-40, Crooked I, Method Man, WC	None
"Witness Protection"	2003	None	Beef soundtrack
"Thug Night (Let Me See Something)"	2003	None	True Crime: Streets of LA soundtrack
"Ride wit' Us"	2003	Gangsta, C-Bo	Penitentiary Chances
"Lately"	2004	Mr. Knightowl, Slush the Villain, Big Syke	The Ghetto Bird
"I Ain't No Joke"	2004	None	Old School New Style
"Deep Blue Sea"	2004	Cormega, Kurupt	Legal Hustle
"Reality"	2004	The Wacsta, Spice 1, WC	Westcoast Resurrected
"Back on the Block"	2004	None	The Baby Ree Mixtape, Vol. 2
"When I See You"	2004	Knoc-Turn'al	The Baby Ree Mixtape, Vol. 2
"Gangsta Lean"	2004	Titus, Butch Cassidy, Kilo	The Baby Ree Mixtape, Vol. 2 / Back B4 You're Lonely
"Too Gangsta!"	2004	Izakane, Yukmouth, Kurupt	The Beginning
"Don't Move"	2004	MC Eiht	Smoke in tha City
"Get Got"	2005	Spanky Loco	Loco Life
"One Shot Kill"	2005	J. Wells	Digital Master
"Money Thang"	2005	Spice 1, Kurupt	The Truth
"Pain Killerz"	2006	Kokane, Kam	Pain Killer'z
"Gun Clappin'"	2006	Cashis, Roscoe, Rikanatti, Kurupt	Cashis of Shady Records
"Back 2 Back"	2006	The Game	The Black Wall Street Journal, Vol. 1
"Fuck Daz"	2006	40 Glocc, Kurupt	Outspoken, Vol. 2
"End of the Road"	2006	40 Glocc, Kurupt, Baby Down, Westside Bugg	Outspoken, Vol. 2
"Get Your Neck Crack Baby"	2006	40 Glocc, Zoo Babies, Lil' Tute	Outspoken, Vol. 2
We See You Niggas"	2006	WC, Young Maylay	CT Experience
"Take 'Em All Out"	2006	Dido Brown	Talez of a Young Brown Male
"C.Y.A."	2006	Dido Brown	Talez of a Young Brown Male
"Keep It Craccin'"	2006	Spider Loc, C-Bo	Southwest Influence
"Informant"	2007	Westside Bugg	The Roach Motel
"Blaze It Up"	2007	Tha Dogg Pound, Glasses Malone, B.G. Knocc Out, Dresta	Dogg Chit
"When the Yellow Bus Stops"	2007	40 Glocc, Keak da Sneak	That New Nigga
"Guns & Roses"	2007	RedCloud, Tonéx, Eek-A-Mouse	Hawthorne's Most Wanted
"C.R.I.P."	2007	Spider Loc, Dresta, C-Bo, Roccett	Bangadoshish II
"Do What the Fuck I Wanna"	2007	Daz Dillinger	Gangsta Party
"Lets Your Nuts Hang"	2007	40 Glocc, Kokane, Tony Yayo	Outspoken, Vol. 3
"Snake Charmer"	2008	Pass Pass	Street Bounce
"Lord Knows I've Tried"	2009	Young Hyeenaz	Hungry for a Mil
"Pass The Hennessy"	2009	Dido Brown	Legal Boss: Street Biz
"Out Here on the West"	2010	Seven, A.L.T. the Saint	Public Enemy
"Low Low Bounce"	2010	Fatal Mack, Tony V, Glasses Malone	None
"Things Ain't the Same"	2010	Cricet	Mercy
"Oh, Oh Here She Comes"	2010	Knoc-Turn'al, Sabrina, Jaguar	1-11-11: The Prequel
"Life in California"	2010	Ice Cube, WC	I Am the West
"G.L.O.C.C. & J.A.Y.O."	2011	40 Glocc	COPS: Criping on Public Streets
"Funny Shit"	2011	40 Glocc & Spider Loc, Kurupt, Village Boo	Graveyard Shift
"Money, Sex, Murder, Drugz"	2011	40 Glocc & Spider Loc	Graveyard Shift
"That's the Way I Like It"	2011	40 Glocc & Spider Loc, Blaqthoven, Obie Trice	Graveyard Shift
"Sorry I Left You (Remix)"	2011	Knoc-Turn'al, Yukmouth, Sly Boogy	Knoc's Ville
"We Do It Bigg"	2011	C-Lim & Lil' Danger	Bang Status
"Femme Fatale"	2012	One-2, Knoc-Turn'al	Destiny
"Try Me"	2012	Kay Nine tha Boss, Tommy Redding, C-Quel	Tha Back Streets
"Step Ya Weed Game Up"	2012	Yukmouth, Daz Dillinger	Half Baked
"Wish You Would"	2013	C-Bo	I Am Gangsta Rap
"Grown Man Shit"	2014	Dresta, B.G. Knocc Out	None
"Don't Blow My High"	2014	Far from Ya Average	The Basement LP
"Havin' Thangs"	2016	Roadie Rose, CJ Mac	Changed Man
"The Elite"	2016	Cold 187um, Tha Dogg Pound, Money B	The Black Godfather, Act Two
"Gang Streetz"	2018	Daz Dillinger	Dazamataz
"Fruit Punch"	2018	Serial Killers, Brevi	Day of the Dead
"Sirens"	2019	MC Eiht	Official
"Murda Rap"	2020	Tha Chill, Kxng Crooked	Fohead
"Apply Pressure"	2021	Outlawz, H Ryda	One Nation
"The Anthem"	2022	MC Ren, Tha Chill, J-Dee, Ras Kass, Cold 187um	Osiris
"This Is How We Do It"	2023	Rekta, Blaqthoven	Keep It Real
"Set"	2024	Big June, Googie Monsta, Tiny Doo, Lil' CS, Damu	Through the Eyes of a General
"Black & Brown"	2025	Dezzy Hollow, Lil' Rob	Oceanside
