= 2001 in hip-hop =

This article summarizes the events, album releases, and album release dates in hip-hop for the year 2001.

== Released albums ==
Release Date	Artist	Album
January 9	Various Arists	Oz (soundtrack)
January 16	Lil Keke	From Coast to Coast
February 6	Candyman	Knockin' Boots 2001: A Sex Odyssey
February 6	Typical Cats	Typical Cats
February 13	Fredro Starr	Firestarr
February 13	Smut Peddlers	Porn Again
February 13	Jay Tee	The Knocks 1992–2000
February 13	Various Artists	Down to Earth (soundtrack)
February 20	Spice 1	Hits II: Ganked & Gaffled
February 26	J Dilla	Welcome 2 Detroit
February 27	Big Hawk	Hawk
February 27	DJ Clue?	The Professional 2
February 27	South Central Cartel	Gangsta Conversation
February 27	Project Pat	Mista Don't Play: Everythangs Workin
February 27	Silkk the Shocker	My World, My Way
March 6	Eve	Scorpion
March 6	Daz Dillinger & JT the Bigga Figga	Game for Sale
March 6	Aceyalone	Accepted Eclectic
March 13	Luke	Somethin' Nasty
March 19	Various Artists	West Coast Bad Boyz, Vol. 3: Poppin' Collars
March 20	Afrika Bambaataa	Looking for the Perfect Beat: 1980–1985
March 20	Layzie Bone	Thug by Nature
March 20	The Beatnuts	Take It or Squeeze It
March 20	Mr. Short Khop	Da Khop Shop
March 20	Various Artists	Exit Wounds (soundtrack)
March 20	Bizzy Bone	The Gift
March 20	Kam	Kamnesia
March 20	Trick Daddy	Thugs Are Us
March 23	Various Artists	The Brothers (soundtrack)
March 26	Gorillaz	Gorillaz
March 27	2Pac	Until The End of Time
March 27	Yukmouth	Thug Lord: The New Testament
March 27	Ghetto Twiinz	Got It on My Mind
March 27	Rasheeda	Dirty South
April 3	Cappadonna	The Yin and the Yang
April 3	Run–D.M.C.	Crown Royal
April 3	Big Pun	Endangered Species
April 10	C-Bo	C-Bo's Best Appearances
April 14	Noah23	Neophyte Phenotype
April 17	Angie Martinez	Up Close and Personal
April 18	Coolio	Coolio.com
April 24	G Love & Special Sauce	The Electric Mile
April 24	O.C.	Bon Appetit
April 24	KRS-One	The Sneak Attack
May 1	J-Live	The Best Part
May 1	Tha Dogg Pound	Dillinger & Young Gotti
May 1	Pete Rock	PeteStrumentals
May 1	cLOUDDEAD	cLOUDDEAD
May 7	Ugly Duckling	Journey to Anywhere
May 8	MC Breed	The Fharmacist
May 8	Saul Williams	Amethyst Rock Star
May 8	Hi-Tek	Hi-Teknology
May 15	Cannibal Ox	The Cold Vein
May 15	Michael Franti & Spearhead	Stay Human
May 15	Missy Elliott	Miss E... So Addictive
May 22	Kardinal Offishall	Quest for Fire: Firestarter, Vol. 1
May 22	Lil Jon & The East Side Boyz	Put Yo Hood Up
May 22	Pastor Troy	Face Off
May 22	Redman	Malpractice
May 22	Snypaz	Livin' in the Scope
May 22	Sticky Fingaz	Blacktrash: The Autobiography of Kirk Jones
May 28	Stereo MC's	Deep Down & Dirty
May 29	Various Artists	What's the Worst That Could Happen? (soundtrack)
June 5	Various Artists	Dr. Dolittle 2 (soundtrack)
June 5	St. Lunatics	Free City
June 5	Turk	Young & Thuggin'
June 5	Kool Keith	Spankmaster
June 5	Tragedy Khadafi	Against All Odds
June 5	Various Artists	The Fast and the Furious (soundtrack)
June 12	Jay Tee	So Cold
June 12	AZ	9 Lives
June 12	Various Artists	MTV's Hip Hopera: Carmen
June 19	Baby Beesh	Savage Dreams
June 19	D12	Devil's Night
June 19	Outsidaz	The Bricks
June 19	Esham	Tongues
June 19	Eric B. & Rakim	20th Century Masters – The Millennium Collection: The Best of Eric B. & Rakim
June 19	Public Enemy	20th Century Masters – The Millennium Collection: The Best of Public Enemy
June 19	Various Artists	Baby Boy (soundtrack)
June 19	Scapegoat Wax	Okeeblow
June 26	Beanie Sigel	The Reason
June 26	Lil' Mo	Based on a True Story
June 26	Various Artists	Pootie Tang (soundtrack)
June 26	Screwball	Loyalty
July 3	Lil' Romeo	Lil' Romeo
July 3	Psychopathic Rydas	Ryden Dirtay
July 3	Various Artists	Kiss of the Dragon (soundtrack)
July 3	Various Artists	Nuthin' but a Gangsta Party 2
July 3	Wu-Tang Clan	Wu-Chronicles, Chapter 2
July 10	Killah Priest	Priesthood
July 10	P. Diddy & the Bad Boy Family	The Saga Continues...
July 10	Tha Alkaholiks	X.O. Experience
July 10	Z-Ro	King of da Ghetto
July 17	Bad Azz	Personal Business
July 17	Coolio	Fantastic Voyage: The Greatest Hits
July 17	Dark Lotus	Tales from the Lotus Pod
July 17	Foxy Brown	Broken Silence
July 17	Kurupt	Space Boogie: Smoke Oddessey
July 17	Little-T and One Track Mike	Fome Is Dape
July 24	Cormega	The Realness
July 24	7L & Esoteric	The Soul Purpose
July 24	Soulja Slim	The Streets Made Me
July 24	Pep Love	Ascension
July 24	Violator	Violator: The Album, V2.0
July 31	Tha Eastsidaz	Duces 'n Trayz: The Old Fashioned Way
July 31	Gangsta Boo	Both Worlds *69
July 31	Soopafly	Dat Whoopty Woop
July 31	Various Artists	Rush Hour 2 (soundtrack)
August 6	N*E*R*D	In Search Of... (first version)
August 7	Jadakiss	Kiss tha Game Goodbye
August 7	Krazy	Breather Life
August 7	Various Artists	Osmosis Jones (soundtrack)
August 13	Roots Manuva	Run Come Save Me
August 14	Lisa "Left Eye" Lopes	Supernova
August 14	Various Artists	The Source Hip Hop Music Awards 2001
August 21	Juvenile	Project English
August 21	Various Artists	Rush Hour 2 (soundtrack)
August 21	Chino XL	I Told You So
August 28	RZA	Digital Bullet
August 28	Brotha Lynch Hung & C-Bo	Blocc Movement
August 28	Tech N9ne	Anghellic
August 28	Krayzie Bone	Thug on da Line
August 28	Dru Down	Pimpin' Phernelia
September 4	MC Lyte	The Very Best of MC Lyte
September 4	Unspoken Heard	Soon Come
September 11	Arsonists	Date of Birth
September 11	Fabolous	Ghetto Fabolous
September 11	Jay-Z	The Blueprint
September 11	Killarmy	Fear, Love & War
September 11	Professor Griff	And the Word Became Flesh
September 11	Techno Animal	The Brotherhood of the Bomb
September 11	Yesterday's New Quintet	Angles Without Edges
September 11	Various Artists	Hardball (soundtrack)
September 11	Various Artists	Training Day (soundtrack)
September 18	Aesop Rock	Labor Days
September 18	Coo Coo Cal	Disturbed
September 18	Gangsta Pat	Return of the No. 1 Suspect
September 18	Immortal Technique	Revolutionary Vol. 1
September 18	Brand Nubian	The Very Best of Brand Nubian
September 25	Various Artists	The Wash (soundtrack)
September 25	Big Syke	Big Syke Daddy
September 25	Gemini	6:16 The Genesis
September 25	Guru	Baldhead Slick & da Click
September 25	FUBU	The Good Life (FUBU album)
October 1	Eyedea & Abilities	First Born
October 2	Busta Rhymes	Total Devastation: The Best of Busta Rhymes
October 2	Ja Rule	Pain Is Love
October 2	Stu Dent	Altered State
October 9	T.I.	I'm Serious
October 9	Bubba Sparxxx	Dark Days, Bright Nights
October 9	Various Artists	Bones (soundtrack)
October 16	Blaze Ya Dead Homie	1 Less G n da Hood
October 16	Masta Ace	Disposable Arts
October 16	Freestyle Fellowship	Temptations
October 23	Dilated Peoples	Expansion Team
October 23	C-Murder	C-P-3.com
October 23	Snoop Dogg	Death Row: Snoop Doggy Dogg at His Best
October 23	Vanilla Ice	Bi-Polar
October 23	DMX	The Great Depression
October 23	Jayo Felony	Crip Hop
October 23	La Chat	Murder She Spoke
October 25	Tunnel Rats	Tunnel Vision
October 30	Canibus	C! True Hollywood Stories
October 30	CunninLynguists	Will Rap for Food
October 30	Daz Dillinger	Who Ride wit Us: Tha Compalation, Vol. 1
October 30	Erick Sermon	Music
October 30	Jermaine Dupri	Instructions
October 30	Three 6 Mafia	Choices: The Album
November 6	The Coup	Party Music
November 6	Lil' Keke	Platinum in da Ghetto
November 6	Mitchy Slick	Trigeration Station
November 6	Outlawz	Novakane
November 6	Petey Pablo	Diary of a Sinner: 1st Entry
November 6	The R.O.C.	Wormholes
November 13	Necro	Gory Days
November 13	UGK	Dirty Money
November 13	Swollen Members	Bad Dreams
November 13	Ghostface Killah	Bulletproof Wallets
November 20	8Ball	Almost Famous
November 20	G. Dep	Child of the Ghetto
November 20	Kid Rock	Cocky
November 20	Mac Dre	It's Not What You Say... It's How You Say It
November 20	Timbaland & Magoo	Indecent Proposal
November 20	Illogic	Got Lyrics?
November 20	Dungeon Family	Even in Darkness
November 27	Busta Rhymes	Genesis
November 27	Ludacris	Word of Mouf
December 1	Braintax	Biro Funk
December 4	De La Soul	AOI: Bionix
December 4	Cypress Hill	Stoned Raiders
December 4	Nate Dogg	Music & Me
December 4	Mack 10	Bang or Ball
December 4	South Park Mexican	Never Change
December 4	Fat Joe	Jealous Ones Still Envy (J.O.S.E.)
December 4	Ice Cube	Greatest Hits
December 4	OutKast	Big Boi and Dre Present...OutKast
December 11	Warren G	The Return of the Regulator
December 11	Mobb Deep	Infamy
December 11	Method Man & Redman	How High (soundtrack)
December 18	Jay-Z and The Roots	MTV Unplugged
December 18	Nas	Stillmatic
December 18	Wu-Tang Clan	Iron Flag
December 18	Master P	Game Face
December 18	Mystikal	Tarantula
December 18	Lil' Bow Wow	Doggy Bag
December 18	Ruff Ryders	Ryde or Die Vol. 3: In the "R" We Trust
December 18	Various Artists	The Source Presents: Hip Hop Hits, Vol. 5

== Highest-charting singles ==
Hip hop singles from any year which charted in the 2001 Top 40 of the Billboard Hot 100
Song	Artist	Project	Peak position
"Ms. Jackson"	OutKast	Stankonia	1
"Ride Wit Me"	Nelly featuring City Spud	Country Grammar	3
"Izzo (H.O.V.A.)"	Jay-Z	The Blueprint	8
"E.I."	Nelly	Country Grammar	15
"Girls, Girls, Girls"	Jay-Z	The Blueprint	17
"I'm a Thug"	Trick Daddy	Thugs Are Us	17
"Purple Pills"	D12	Devil's Night	19
"#1"	Nelly	Nellyville	22
"Music"	Erick Sermon featuring Marvin Gaye	Music	22
"Area Codes"	Ludacris featuring Nate Dogg	Word of Mouf	24
"Can't Deny It"	Fabolous featuring Nate Dogg	Ghetto Fabolous	25
"Oochie Wally"	Nas & Bravehearts	Nas & Ill Will Records Presents QB's Finest	26
"So Fresh, So Clean"	OutKast	Stankonia	31

== Highest first-week sales ==
List of top ten albums with the highest first-week
Number	Album	Artist	1st-week sales	1st-week position
1	The Great Depression	DMX	439,000	1
2	Until The End of Time	2Pac	427,000	1
3	The Blueprint	Jay-Z	420,000	1
4	Devil's Night	D12	372,000	1
5	Pain Is Love	Ja Rule	361,000	1
6	Stillmatic	Nas	342,000	8
7	Doggy Bag	Lil' Bow Wow	320,000	11
8	Word of Mouf	Ludacris	281,000	3
9	Miss E...So Addictive	Missy Elliott	250,000	2
10	Project English	Juvenile	213,000	2

== All critically reviewed albums ranked (Metacritic) ==
Number	Artist	Album	Average score	Number of reviews	Reference
1	Aesop Rock	Labor Days	92	5 reviews	
2	Missy Elliott	Miss E... So Addictive	89	16 reviews	
3	Jay-Z	The Blueprint	88	12 reviews	
4	The Coup	Party Music	85	11 reviews	
5	De La Soul	AOI: Bionix	77	15 reviews	
6	Busta Rhymes	Genesis	77	8 reviews	
7	Gorillaz	Gorillaz	71	18 reviews	
8	Dilated Peoples	Expansion Team	71	12 reviews	
9	Eve	Scorpion	70	12 reviews	
10	Nas	Stillmatic	69	12 reviews	
11	Wu-Tang Clan	Iron Flag	69	12 reviews	
12	KRS-One	The Sneak Attack	69	8 reviews	
13	Stereo MC's	Deep Down & Dirty	68	13 reviews	
14	Mystikal	Tarantula	68	7 reviews	
15	Ludacris	Word of Mouf	67	8 reviews	
16	RZA	Digital Bullet	67	8 reviews	
17	Tha Liks	X.O. Experience	65	10 reviews	
18	Arsonists	Date of Birth	63	7 reviews	
19	Silkk The Shocker	My World, My Way	63	6 reviews	
20	DMX	The Great Depression	62	10 reviews	
21	Sisqó	Return of Dragon	61	9 reviews	
22	Ja Rule	Pain Is Love	59	10 reviews	
23	Redman	Malpractice	59	8 reviews	
24	D12	Devil's Night	58	11 reviews	
25	2Pac	Until the End of Time	51	8 reviews	
26	Run-DMC	Crown Royal	43	17 reviews	
27	Master P	Game Face	40	4 reviews	

== See also ==
- Previous article: 2000 in hip-hop
- Next article: 2002 in hip-hop
