= Hits II: Ganked & Gaffled =

Greatest hits album by Spice 1
- Released: February 20, 2001
- Recorded: 1991–2001
- Genres: West Coast hip hop, rap, gangsta rap
- Length: 72:33
- Label: Mobb Status Ent.
- Producers: Ant Banks, Blackjack, E-A-Ski, Johnny Z, Mike Dean, Mike Mosley, Mr. Lee, Paris, Prodeje, Rick Rock, Sam Bostic, Spice 1

Spice 1 compilation chronology
The Playa Rich Project (2000)	Hits II: Ganked & Gaffled (2001)	The Playa Rich Project 2 (2002)

Hits II: Ganked & Gaffled is second greatest hits album by American rapper Spice 1. It was released February 20, 2001 on Mobb Status Entertainment. The album features production by Ant Banks, Blackjack, E-A-Ski, Mike Dean, Paris, Rick Rock, Sam Bostic and Spice 1. It features songs from all of Spice 1's previous albums, as well as guest appearances from the albums: Hard to Hit, In a Major Way, Lost and the single "I Got 5 on It". The album features performances by 2Pac, E-40, Luniz, Dru Down, Shock G, Richie Rich, Roger Troutman, Too Short, 8Ball and Rappin' 4-Tay.

Hits II: Ganked & Gaffled was released in between two Spice 1 studio albums, The Last Dance (2000) and Spiceberg Slim (2002). The album is the second of three greatest hits compilations by Spice 1, Hits and Hits 3, were released in 1998 and 2002, respectively.

Although Mac Dre and Da' Unda' Dogg's names appear on the album cover, neither rapper participates on the project.

== Critical reception ==
Professional ratings
Review scores
Source	Rating
Allmusic	2.5/5 stars
RapReviews	8.5/10 stars

Allmusic - "...Spice 1's first of two greatest-hits collections in two years...compiles a modest number of the notorious West Coast hardcore rapper's performances..."

RapReviews - "...the hits on this album keep coming and the beats keep pounding while you get to witness one of the fiercest MC's the West Coast and rap in general has to offer."

== Track listing ==
1. "Strap on the Side" - 4:47 (from the album AmeriKKKa's Nightmare)
2. "Mo' Mail" (featuring E-40) - 4:30 (from the album 187 He Wrote)
3. "Peace to My Nine" - 4:58 (from the album Spice 1)
4. "Twirk It" (featuring Big Mike & Jayo Felony) - 5:22 (from the album Hard to Hit)
5. "Doncha Runaway" - 4:57 (from the album AmeriKKKa's Nightmare)
6. "Playa Man" - 4:08 (from the album The Black Bossalini)
7. "Runnin' Out da Crackhouse" - 3:18 (from the album 187 He Wrote)
8. "Dusted N Disgusted" (featuring E-40, 2Pac, Mac Mall & Levitti) - 4:31 (from the album In a Major Way)
9. "Mobbin'" - 4:19 (from the album 1990-Sick)
10. "Face of a Desperate Man" - 4:52 (from the album AmeriKKKa's Nightmare)
11. "380 on That Ass" (featuring Havikk & Prodeje) - 4:19 (from the album 187 He Wrote)
12. "I Got 5 on It (Remix)" (featuring Luniz, Dru Down, E-40, Shock G & Richie Rich) - 4:14 (from the single "I Got 5 on It")
13. "Suckaz Do What They Can" (featuring Roger Troutman, Too Short & Yukmouth) - 5:28 (from the album Immortalized)
14. "East Bay Gangster (Reggae)" - 4:32 (from the album Spice 1)
15. "20/20's" (featuring Bad Azz) - 3:39 (from the album The Last Dance)
16. "360 Degrees" (featuring 8Ball, Rappin' 4-Tay, Otis & Shug) - 4:39 (from the album Lost)
