= 2002 in hip-hop =

This article summarizes the events, album releases, and album release dates in hip hop music for the year 2002.

== Events ==
=== April ===
- On April 25, Lisa "Left Eye" Lopes died in Honduras.

=== May ===
- On May 26, The Eminem Show was released.

=== June ===
- On June 15, Big Mello died.

=== October ===
- On October 30, Jam Master Jay died in New York City.

== Released albums ==
Release date	Artist	Album	Label
January 1	Boosie Badazz	For My Thugz	Trill Entertainment
January 8	Deepspace5	The Night We Called It a Day	UpRok
January 22	KRS-One	Spiritual Minded	Koch Records
January 22	Spice 1	The Playa Rich Project 2	LGB Music Group
January 22	X-Raided	Deadly Game	JLM Entertainment
January 29	C-Bo	Life as a Rider	West Coast Mafia Records, Warlock Records
January 29	State Property	State Property Soundtrack	Roc-A-Fella Records, Def Jam Recordings
February 1	Jennifer Lopez	J to tha L–O! The Remixes	Epic Records
February 5	Aesop Rock	Daylight	Definitive Jux
February 12	Heather B.	Eternal Affairs	Sai Records
February 12	PSD	All I Want	Gateway Entertainment
February 19	Various Artists	All About the Benjamins (soundtrack)	New Line Records
February 24	Souljahz	The Fault Is History	World Entertainment, LLC.
February 25	Deep Puddle Dynamics/Anticon	We Ain't Fessin' (Double Quotes)	Anticon
February 26	The High & Mighty	Air Force 1	Eastern Conference Records
February 26	The X-Ecutioners	Built From Scratch	Loud Records, Columbia Records
February 26	Nappy Roots	Watermelon, Chicken & Gritz	Atlantic Records
February 26	Aim	Hinterland	Grand Central Records
March 12	N.E.R.D.	In Search Of... [Second Version]	Virgin Records, EMI
March 12	New Breed	Stop the Music	UpRok, EMI CMG
March 19	R. Kelly & Jay-Z	The Best of Both Worlds	Roc-A-Fella Records, Def Jam Recordings, Jive Records, Rockland Records
March 19	No Limit Records	West Coast Bad Boyz, Vol. 3: Poppin' Collars	No Limit Records
March 19	Rasheeda	A Ghetto Dream	D-Lo Entertainment
March 19	Edan	Primitive Plus	Lewis Recordings
March 19	Various Artists	Blade II (soundtrack)	Immortal Records
March 25	The Streets	Original Pirate Material	Locked On Records, 679 Recordings
March 26	Baha Men	Move It Like This	S-Curve Records, Capitol Records
March 26	Eazy-E	Impact of a Legend	Ruthless Records, Epic Records
March 26	k-os	Exit	Astralwerks
March 26	Non Phixion	The Future Is Now	Uncle Howie Records
March 26	Ying Yang Twins	Alley: The Return of the Ying Yang Twins	Koch Records
April 2	Busta Rhymes	Turn It Up! The Very Best of Busta Rhymes	Warner Music Group, Rhino Records
April 2	J-Live	All of the Above	Coup D'État
April 5	Pezet/Noon	Muzyka Klasyczna	T1-Teraz
April 8	O.S.T.R.	30 minut z życia	Asfalt Records
April 9	Twiztid	Mirror Mirror	Psychopathic Records
April 9	Spice 1	Hits 3	Mobb Status Entertainment
April 16	Sage Francis	Personal Journals	Anticon
April 23	Cee-Lo	Cee-Lo Green and His Perfect Imperfections	Arista Records
April 30	Blackalicious	Blazing Arrow	MCA Records
April 30	Big Tymers	Hood Rich	Cash Money Records, Universal Records
April 30	Count Bass D	Dwight Spitz	High Times
April 30	C-Murder	Tru Dawgs	D3 Entertainment
May 7	Biz Markie	Greatest Hits	Landspeed Records
May 7	Kastro & E.D.I.	Blood Brothers	Outlaw Recordz
May 7	Naughty by Nature	IIcons	TVT Records
May 14	Cam'ron	Come Home with Me	Roc-A-Fella Records, Diplomat Records, Def Jam Recordings
May 14	El-P	Fantastic Damage	Definitive Jux
May 14	P. Diddy & the Bad Boy Family	We Invented the Remix	Bad Boy Records, Arista Records
May 18	Noah23	Quicksand	Plague Language
May 21	50 Cent	Guess Who's Back?	Full Clip Records
May 21	Big Syke	Street Commando	Riviera Records
May 21	Camp Lo	Let's Do It Again	Dymond Crook Records
May 26	Eminem	The Eminem Show	Shady Records, Aftermath Entertainment, Interscope Records, Web Entertainment
May 28	Lil' Keke	Birds Fly South	Averice
June 3	Northern State	Dying in Stereo	Startime International, Columbia Records
June 4	People Under the Stairs	O.S.T.	Om Records
June 4	Rawkus Records	Soundbombing III	Rawkus
June 10	Ms. Dynamite	A Little Deeper	Polydor Records
June 11	Atmosphere	God Loves Ugly	Rhymesayers Entertainment, Fat Beats Records
June 11	AZ	Aziatic	Motown Records
June 11	Spice 1	Spiceberg Slim	Hard Tyme Records, Riviera Records
June 11	Various Artists	Love and a Bullet (soundtrack)	TVT Soundtrax
June 14	1200 Techniques	Choose One	Rubber Records, Sony Records
June 18	Benzino	The Benzino Remix Project	Elektra Records, ZNO Records
June 18	Latino Velvet	Velvetism	40 Ounce Records
June 18	Wyclef Jean	Masquerade	Columbia Records
June 22	Baracuda72	Tetragammoth	Plague Language
June 24	O.S.T.R.	Tabasko	Asfalt Records
June 25	Cormega	The True Meaning	Legal Hustle Entertainment
June 25	N.O.R.E.	God's Favorite	Thugged Out Entertainment, Def Jam Recordings
June 25	Nelly	Nellyville	Universal Records
June 25	Will Smith	Born to Reign	Columbia Records
June 25	Mr. Lif	Emergency Rations	Definitive Jux
July 2	Eyedea	The Many Faces of Oliver Hart or How Eye One the Write Too Think	Rhymesayers Entertainment
July 2	Nas	From Illmatic to Stillmatic: The Remixes	Ill Will Records, Columbia Records
July 2	The Inc.	Irv Gotti Presents: The Inc.	The Island Def Jam Music Group, Murder Inc. Records
July 2	X-Raided	City of Kings	Out of Bounds Records
July 2	Various Artists	Like Mike (soundtrack)	So So Def Recordings, Columbia Records, Sony Music Soundtrax
July 8	Roots Manuva	Dub Come Save Me	Big Dada
July 9	Onyx	Bacdafucup Part II	Koch Records
July 9	Styles P	A Gangster and a Gentleman	Ruff Ryders, Interscope Records
July 16	Juicy J	Chronicles of the Juice Man	Hypnotize Minds Productions, North North Records
July 16	KJ-52	Collaborations	BEC Recordings
July 16	Various Artists	United Ghettos of America	Smoke-a-Lot Records, Rap-a-Lot Records
July 23	C-Bo	West Coast Mafia	West Coast Mafia Records
July 23	Jean Grae	Attack of the Attacking Things	Third Earth Music
July 23	The Beatnuts	The Originators	Landspeed
July 23	Jumpsteady	The Chaos Theory	Psychopathic Records
July 23	Lil Wayne	500 Degreez	Cash Money Records
July 23	Public Enemy	Revolverlution	Koch Records
July 23	Thirstin Howl III	Skilligan’s Island	LandSpeed Records
July 29	Big Mello	The Gift	KMJ Records
July 30	Richie Rich	Nixon Pryor Roundtree	Ten-Six Records
July 30	Knoc-Turn'al	L.A. Confidential presents: Knoc-Turn'al	Elektra Records
August 6	Cage	Movies for the Blind	Eastern Conference Records
August 6	Project Pat	Layin' da Smack Down	Loud Records
August 6	Scarface	The Fix	Def Jam South
August 6	Trick Daddy	Thug Holiday	Slip-N-Slide Records, Atlantic Records
August 6	Various Artists	XXX (soundtrack)	Universal Records, UMG Soundtracks
August 10	Various Artists	NBA Livestyle 2003	EA Trax
August 13	Do or Die	Back 2 the Game	Rap-A-Lot Records, Virgin Records
August 13	Luniz	Silver & Black	Rap-A-Lot Records, Virgin Records, Asylum Records
August 13	Mary J. Blige	Dance For Me	MCA Records
August 13	Slum Village	Trinity (Past, Present and Future)	Capitol Records
August 13	Doggystyle Records	Snoop Dogg Presents... Doggy Style Allstars Vol. 1	Doggystyle Records
August 20	Angie Martinez	Animal House	Elektra Records
August 20	Clipse	Lord Willin'	Star Trak Entertainment, Jive Records
August 20	Tray Deee	The General's List	Empire Music Werks
August 20	Various Artists	Dexter's Laboratory: The Hip-Hop Experiment	Kid Rhino/Atlantic Records
August 27	Devin the Dude	Just Tryin' ta Live	Rap-a-Lot Records
August 27	Eve	Eve-Olution	Ruff Ryders Entertainment, Interscope Records
August 27	GRITS	The Art of Translation	Gotee Records
August 27	KRS-One	The Mix Tape	Koch Records
August 27	Lil Flip	Undaground Legend	Sucka Free, Loud Records, Columbia Records
August 27	N.W.A.	The N.W.A Legacy, Vol. 2	Ruthless Records, Priority Records
August 27	Promatic	Promatic	Koch Records
August 27	Trina	Diamond Princess	Slip-n-Slide Records, Atlantic Records
August 27	Uncle Kracker	No Stranger to Shame	Lava Records
August 27	Various Artists	Barbershop (soundtrack)	Sony Music Soundtrax
September 3	Lil Rob	The Album	Upstairs Records
September 3	Various Artists	Peanut Butter Wolf's Jukebox 45's	Stones Throw Records
September 9	Outlandish	Bread & Barrels of Water	RCA Records, Sony BMG Music Entertainment
September 9	Jehst	The Return of the Drifter	Low Life Records
September 10	Heavy D & The Boyz	20th Century Masters – The Millennium Collection: The Best of Heavy D & The Boyz	MCA Records
September 10	Shade Sheist	Informal Introduction	MCA Records
September 10	Various Artists	Golden Grain	Disturbing tha Peace
September 10	Tech N9ne	Absolute Power	Strange Music
September 12	DJ Jazzy Jeff	The Magnificent	BBE Records
September 16	Boom Bip	Seed to Sun	Lex Records
September 16	Themselves	Them	Anticon
September 17	Mr. Lif	I Phantom	Definitive Jux
September 17	Scapegoat Wax	SWAX	Hollywood Records
September 23	DJ Vadim	U.S.S.R. The Art of Listening	Ninja Tune
September 24	Nas	The Lost Tapes	Ill Will Records, Columbia Records
September 24	UGK	Side Hustles	Jive Records
September 24	Various Artists	Brown Sugar (soundtrack)	MCA Records
September 25	Paktofonika	Archiwum kinematografii	Gigant Records
October 1	Daz Dillinger	To Live and Die in CA	D.P.G. Recordz
October 1	Xzibit	Man vs. Machine	Open Bar Entertainment, Loud Records, Columbia Records
October 1	7L & Esoteric	Warning: Dangerous Exclusives	Brick Records
October 7	K-Gee	Bounce to This	Instant Karma
October 8	Boot Camp Clik	The Chosen Few	Duck Down Music
October 8	Jurassic 5	Power in Numbers	Interscope Records
October 8	Krumb Snatcha	Respect All Fear None	D&D Records
October 8	Large Professor	1st Class	Matador Records
October 8	Tela	Double Dose	Rap-a-Lot Records
October 8	UTP	The Compilation	Orpheus Records
October 8	7L & Esoteric	Dangerous Connection	Brick Records
October 10	Young Buck	Born to Be a Thug	UTP Records, Thug Entertainment
October 15	Coolio	El Cool Magnifico	Riviera Records
October 15	Da Heabussaz (Three 6 Mafia & Fiend)	Dat's How It Happen to'M	Hypnotize Minds Productions, Fiend Entertainment
October 15	LL Cool J	10	Def Jam Recordings
October 15	Supastition	7 Years of Bad Luck	Freshchest Records
October 21	Bushido & Fler	Carlo Cokxxx Nutten	Aggro Berlin
October 22	Big Syke	Big Syke	RideOnUm Records, Rap-A-Lot Records
October 22	Jay Tee	High Caliber	40 Ounce Records
October 22	Jel	10 Seconds	Mush Records
October 22	LL Cool J	20th Century Masters – The Millennium Collection: The Best of LL Cool J	Universal Music Group, Def Jam Recordings
October 22	Field Mob	From tha Roota to tha Toota	MCA Records
October 22	Scarface	Greatest Hits (Scarface album)	Rap-A-Lot Records, Virgin Records
October 22	Various Artists	Paid in Full (soundtrack)	Roc-A-Fella Records, Def Jam Recordings
October 28	WWO	We własnej osobie	Prosto
October 29	Bone Thugs-n-Harmony	Thug World Order	Ruthless Records
October 29	Daz Dillinger	Who Ride wit Us: Tha Compalation, Vol. 2	D.P.G. Recordz
October 29	Jungle Brothers	All That We Do	Jungle Brothers Records
October 29	Lil Jon & The East Side Boyz	Kings of Crunk	BME Recordings, TVT Records
October 29	Penny	The Clockforth Movement	Plague Language
October 29	Various Artists	8 Mile: Music from and Inspired by the Motion Picture	Shady Records, Interscope Records
November 5	Insane Clown Posse	The Wraith: Shangri-La	Psychopathic Records
November 5	Ms. Jade	Girl Interrupted	Beat Club, Interscope Records
November 5	Murder Inc.	Irv Gotti Presents: The Remixes	
November 5	Soul-Junk	1957	
November 9	Sev Statik	Speak Life	UpRock, EMI CMG
November 11	Felt	Felt: A Tribute to Christina Ricci	Rhymesayers Entertainment
November 12	Indo G	Contact	Blackhouse Entertainment
November 12	Jay-Z	The Blueprint 2: The Gift & The Curse	Roc-A-Fella Records, Def Jam Recordings
November 12	Fat Joe	Loyalty	Terror Squad Productions, Atlantic Records
November 12	Missy Elliott	Under Construction	The Goldmind Inc., Elektra Records
November 12	Swollen Members	Monsters in the Closet	Battle Axe Records
November 12	WC	Ghetto Heisman	Def Jam Recordings
November 19	C-Bo	Desert Eagle	Warlock Records
November 19	Canibus	Mic Club: The Curriculum	Mic Club Music
November 19	Erick Sermon	React	J Records
November 19	Ja Rule	The Last Temptation	Murder Inc Records, Def Jam Recordings
November 19	Talib Kweli	Quality	Rawkus Records, MCA Records
November 19	Various Artists	Friday After Next (soundtrack)	Hollywood Records
November 22	Fettes Brot	Amnesie	'Yo Mama's Recording
November 26	2Pac	Better Dayz	Amaru Entertainment, Death Row Records
November 26	Birdman	Birdman	Cash Money Records
November 26	Busta Rhymes	It Ain't Safe No More...	Flipmode Records, J Records
November 26	Royce da 5'9"	Rock City	Columbia Records, E1 Music, Game Recordings
November 26	Snoop Dogg	Paid tha Cost to Be da Boss	Doggystyle Records, Priority Records, Capitol Records
November 26	The Roots	Phrenology	Geffen Records, MCA Records
November 26	Will Smith	Greatest Hits	Columbia Records
November 26	Kool G Rap	The Giancana Story	Koch Records
November 26	Nighthawks (Cage & Camu Tao)	Nighthawks	Eastern Conference Records
November 29	Geto Boys	Greatest Hits	Rap-A-Lot Records
December 10	Common	Electric Circus	MCA Records
December 10	Proof	Electric Cool-Aid: Acid Testing	Iron Fist Records
December 10	504 Boyz	Ballers	The New No Limit Records, Universal Records
December 10	Swizz Beatz	Swizz Beatz Presents G.H.E.T.T.O. Stories	Interscope Records, DreamWorks Records, Full Surface Records
December 10	GZA	Legend of the Liquid Sword	MCA Records, Universal Records
December 10	Various Artists	Drumline (soundtrack)	Jive Records
December 10	Various Artists	The Source Presents: Hip Hop Hits, Vol. 6	Image Entertainment
December 13	Nas	God's Son	Ill Will Records, Columbia Records
December 17	Indo G	Christmas N' Memphis	Big Face
December 17	Lil' Romeo	Game Time	The New No Limit Records, Universal Records
December 17	Spice 1	Thug Disease	Rap Classics

== Highest-charting singles ==
Hip hop singles from any year which charted in the 2002 Top 40 of the Billboard Hot 100
Song	Artist	Project	Peak position
"Lose Yourself"	Eminem	8 Mile: Music from and Inspired by the Motion Picture	1
"Dilemma"	Nelly featuring Kelly Rowland	Nellyville	1
"Hot In Herre"	Nelly	Nellyville	1
"Without Me"	Eminem	The Eminem Show	2
"What's Luv?"	Fat Joe featuring Ashanti	Jealous Ones Still Envy (J.O.S.E.)	2
"Hey Ma"	Cam'ron featuring Juelz Santana, Freekey Zekey & Toya	Come Home with Me	3
"Cleanin' Out My Closet"	Eminem	The Eminem Show	4
"03' Bonnie & Clyde"	Jay-Z featuring Beyonce	The Blueprint 2: The Gift & The Curse	4
"Luv U Better"	LL Cool J	10	4
"Oh Boy"	Cam'ron featuring Juelz Santana	Come Home with Me	4
"Nothin'"	N.O.R.E.	God's Favorite	10
"Pass the Courvoisier, Part II"	Busta Rhymes featuring P. Diddy & Pharrell Williams	Genesis	11
"We Thuggin'"	Fat Joe featuring R. Kelly	Jealous Ones Still Envy (J.O.S.E.)	15
"The Whole World"	OutKast featuring Killer Mike	Big Boi and Dre Present... OutKast	19
"Thugz Mansion"	2Pac	Better Dayz	19
"When the Last Time"	Clipse	Lord Willin'	19
"Trade It All"	Fabolous featuring Jagged Edge	Ghetto Fabolous	20
"Good Times"	Styles P	A Gangster and a Gentleman	22
"Break Ya Neck"	Busta Rhymes	Genesis	26
"Grindin'"	Clipse	Lord Willin'	30
"Young'n (Holla Back)"	Fabolous	Ghetto Fabolous	32
"Welcome to Atlanta"	Jermaine Dupri featuring Ludacris	Instructions	35
"React"	Erick Sermon featuring Redman	React	36

== Highest first-week sales ==
List of top ten albums with the highest first-week
Number	Album	Artist	1st-week sales	1st-week position
1	The Eminem Show	Eminem	1,322,000	1
2	Nellyville	Nelly	714,000	1
3	8 Mile OST	Various Artists	702,000	1
4	The Blueprint 2: The Gift & The Curse	Jay-Z	545,000	1
5	Better Dayz	2Pac	366,000	5
6	Under Construction	Missy Elliott	259,000	3
7	The Last Temptation	Ja Rule	237,000	4
8	Come Home With Me	Cam'ron	226,000	2
9	The Best of Both Worlds	R. Kelly & Jay-Z	223,000	2
10	Paid tha Cost to Be da Boss	Snoop Dogg	174,000	12

== All critically reviewed albums ranked (Metacritic) ==
Number	Artist	Album	Average score	Number of reviews	Reference
1	The Streets	Original Pirate Material	90	25 reviews	
2	The Roots	Phrenology	87	23 reviews	
3	N.E.R.D.	In Search of...	83	20 reviews	
4	Missy Elliott	Under Construction	81	19 reviews	
5	Nas	God's Son	81	18 reviews	
6	Mr. Lif	I Phantom	81	12 reviews	
7	Common	Electric Circus	80	22 reviews	
8	Talib Kweli	Quality	79	19 reviews	
9	Jurassic 5	Power in Numbers	76	20 reviews	
10	Snoop Dogg	Paid tha Cost to Be da Boss	76	14 reviews	
11	Atmosphere	God Loves Ugly	76	9 reviews	
12	Eminem	The Eminem Show	75	20 reviews	
13	DJ Jazzy Jeff	The Magnificent	75	11 reviews	
14	Nelly	Nellyville	70	15 reviews	
15	Eve	Eve-Olution	68	12 reviews	
16	Public Enemy	Revolverlution	65	17 reviews	
17	Busta Rhymes	It Ain't Safe No More...	65	8 reviews	
18	Jay-Z	The Blueprint 2: The Gift & The Curse	64	19 reviews	
19	The X-Ecutioners	Built from Scratch	62	11 reviews	
20	LL Cool J	10	60	8 reviews	
21	Wyclef Jean	Masquerade	60	8 reviews	
22	Slum Village	Trinity (Past, Present and Future)	59	12 reviews	
23	Xzibit	Man vs. Machine	59	9 reviews	
24	Ja Rule	The Last Temptation	57	9 reviews	

== See also ==
- Previous article: 2001 in hip-hop
- Next article: 2003 in hip-hop
