= Hits 3 =

Greatest hits album by Spice 1
- Released: April 9, 2002
- Recorded: 1991–2002
- Genre: West Coast hip hop, rap, gangsta rap
- Label: Mobb Status Ent.
- Producer: Al Eaton, Ant Banks, Blackjack, DJ Paul, DJ Squeaky, Juicy J, Pimp C, Spice 1 (exec.), Tony Harmon

Spice 1 compilation chronology
The Playa Rich Project 2 (2002)	Hits 3 (2002)	Thug Disease (2002)

Hits 3 is third greatest hits album by American rapper Spice 1. It was released April 9, 2002 on Mobb Status Entertainment. The album was produced by Ant Banks, Blackjack, DJ Paul, Juicy J, Pimp C, Al Eaton, DJ Squeaky, Tony Harmon and Spice 1. It features songs from his "post-Jive" releases: The Last Dance, Spiceberg Slim and The Playa Rich Project, one song from the Jive album Immortalized, as well as guest appearances from the albums: The Big Badass, CrazyNDaLazDayz, Colouz Uv Sound and Cellblock Compilation, Vol. 2: Face/Off. Several guest performers appear on the album, including: 2Pac, Ant Banks, Too Short, UGK, Jayo Felony, Tray Dee, Yukmouth, MJG and Three 6 Mafia.

Hits 3 was released in between two Spice 1 studio albums, The Last Dance (2000) and Spiceberg Slim (2002). The album is the third of three greatest hits compilations by Spice 1, Hits and Hits II: Ganked & Gaffled, were released in 1998 and 2001, respectively.

== Critical reception ==
Professional ratings
Review scores
Source	Rating
Allmusic	3/5 stars

Allmusic - "...Spice 1's second of two greatest-hits collections in two years, Hits 3 compiles a modest number of the notorious West Coast hardcore rapper's performances..."

== Track listing ==
1. "Who Can I Trust?" - 3:53 (from the album The Last Dance)
2. "I Can't Turn Back" (featuring 2Pac & Young Akayser) - 3:33 (from the album Cellblock Compilation, Vol. 2: Face/Off)
3. "Got Me Fucked Up" - 3:19 (from the album Spiceberg Slim)
4. "Would You Ride?" - 4:29 (from the album Immortalized)
5. "To Kill a G" (featuring Ant Banks & Too Short) - 5:19 (from the album The Big Badass)
6. "Murder Man" (featuring UGK) - 4:30 (from the album The Last Dance)
7. "That's OK" (featuring Rappin' 4-Tay) - 3:33 (from the album Spiceberg Slim)
8. "Ride or Die" (featuring Jayo Felony, Tray Dee & Yukmouth) - 4:24 (from the album The Playa Rich Project)
9. "Chocolate Philly" (featuring MJG) - 4:18 (from the album The Last Dance)
10. "Playa Pieces" - 4:34 (from the album The Last Dance)
11. "Wet Party" (featuring Three 6 Mafia) - 3:53 (from the album CrazyNDaLazDayz)
12. "East Coast, West Coast" (featuring Simplé E) - 5:43 (from the album Colouz Uv Sound)
