= 2000 in hip-hop =

This article summarizes the events, album releases, and album release dates in hip-hop for the year 2000.

== Released albums ==
Release Date	Artist	Album
January 4	Big Hawk	Under Hawk's Wings
January 4	Jungle Brothers	V.I.P.
January 18	Killa Tay	Snake Eyes
January 18	Outsidaz	Night Life
January 18	MC Breed	The Thugz, Vol. 1
January 25	The LOX	We Are the Streets
January 25	Hypnotize Camp Posse	Three 6 Mafia Presents: Hypnotize Camp Posse
January 27	Lil Boosie	Youngest of da Camp
February 1	Tha Eastsidaz	Tha Eastsidaz
February 8	Ghostface Killah	Supreme Clientele
February 8	dead prez	Let's Get Free
February 8	MC Breed	Rare Breed
February 8	Screwball	Y2K: The Album
February 15	Trick Daddy	Book of Thugs
February 22	Various Artists	3 Strikes (soundtrack)
February 22	D.I.T.C.	D.I.T.C.
February 22	Kid Koala	Carpal Tunnel Syndrome
February 29	Beanie Sigel	The Truth
February 29	Blackalicious	Nia
February 29	Bone Thugs-N-Harmony	BTNHResurrection
March 7	Black Rob	Life Story
March 14	Do or Die	Victory
March 14	Various Artists	Held Up (soundtrack)
March 14	Various Artists	Romeo Must Die (soundtrack)
March 21	Ice Cube	War & Peace Vol. 2 (The Peace Disc)
March 21	3X Krazy	Dual Committee
March 21	Murder Inc Records	Irv Gotti Presents: The Murderers
March 21	Various Artists	Off da Chain Volume 1 2000
March 21	Trina	Da Baddest Bitch
March 21	World Wrestling Federation	WWF Aggression
March 28	Common	Like Water for Chocolate
March 28	Drag-On	Opposite of H2O
March 28	Various Artists	Black and White (soundtrack)
April 3	Criminal Nation	Resurrection
April 4	Big Pun	Yeeeah Baby
April 4	Rah Digga	Dirty Harriet
April 11	Da Brat	Unrestricted
April 11	Del the Funky Homosapien	Both Sides of the Brain
April 11	Various Artists	Ego Trip's The Big Playback
April 18	Tony Touch	The Piece Maker
April 25	Cypress Hill	Skull & Bones
April 25	E.S.G.	City Under Siege
April 25	Ying Yang Twins	Thug Walkin'
April 28	Looptroop	Modern Day City Symphony
May 2	504 Boyz	Goodfellas
May 9	Killah Priest	View from Masada
May 9	Half a Mill	Milíon
May 9	Suga Free	The Konnectid Project, Vol. 1
May 16	DJ Quik	Balance & Options
May 16	Spice 1	The Last Dance
May 16	Big Tymers	I Got That Work
May 23	Deltron 3030	Deltron 3030
May 23	DenGee	DenGee Livin'
May 23	Dilated Peoples	The Platform
May 23	Eminem	The Marshall Mathers LP
May 23	Latino Velvet	Velvet City
May 23	Mac Dre	Heart of a Gangsta, Mind of a Hustla, Tongue of a Pimp
May 23	Sauce Money	Middle Finger U
May 30		
May 30	Uncle Kracker	Double Wide
May 30	Zion I	Mind Over Matter
May 30	Various Artists	Big Momma's House (soundtrack)
June 6	Jurassic 5	Quality Control
June 6	People Under the Stairs	Question in the Form of an Answer
June 13	Quasimoto	The Unseen
June 13	Slum Village	Fantastic, Vol. 2
June 13	Themselves	Them
June 13	Three 6 Mafia	When the Smoke Clears: Sixty 6, Sixty 1
June 13	Various Artists	Shaft (2000 soundtrack)
June 13	Z-Ro	Z-Ro vs. the World
June 20	Afroman	Because I Got High
June 20	Busta Rhymes	Anarchy
June 20	Celly Cel	Deep Conversation
June 20	MC Eiht	N' My Neighborhood
June 20	Mr. Serv-On	War Is Me, Pt. 1: Battle Decisions
June 20	Delinquent Habits	Merry-Go-Round
June 27	Brotha Lynch Hung	EBK4
June 27	Erick Sermon	Erick Onasis
June 27	Freddie Foxxx	Industry Shakedown
June 27	JT the Bigga Figga	Puttin' It on the Map
June 27	Lil' Kim	The Notorious K.I.M.
June 27	Mo Thugs Family	Mo Thugs III: The Mothership
June 27	Nelly	Country Grammar
July 4	Ruff Ryders	Ryde or Die Vol. 2
July 4	Various Artists	Nuthin' but a Gangsta Party
July 11	Various Artists	Nutty Professor II: The Klumps (soundtrack)
July 18	Canibus	2000 BC
July 18	Big Moe	City of Syrup
July 18	Lil' Flip	The Leprechaun
July 18	Channel Live	Armaghetto
July 18	Dan the Automator	A Much Better Tomorrow
July 18	Various Artists	Race Riot
July 25	Baha Men	Who Let the Dogs Out
July 25	B-Legit	Hempin' Ain't Easy
July 25	C-Bo	Enemy of the State
July 25	Kool Keith	Matthew
July 25	Mr. Marcelo	Brick Livin'
July 25	Project Pat	Murderers & Robbers
July 31	Slum Village	Best Kept Secret
August 1	Big L	The Big Picture
August 8	De La Soul	Art Official Intelligence: Mosaic Thump
August 8	Ice-T	Greatest Hits: The Evidence
August 8	Sole	Bottle of Humans
August 15	Lil Jon & the East Side Boyz	We Still Crunk!!
August 15	South Park Mexican	The Purity Album
August 15	Various Artists	The Source Hip Hop Music Awards 2000
August 22	Fiend	Can I Burn?
August 22	KRS-One	A Retrospective
August 22	Lil' Zane	Young World: The Future
August 22	Various Artists	The Original Kings of Comedy (soundtrack)
August 22	Wyclef Jean	The Ecleftic: 2 Sides II a Book
August 29	Amil	A.M.I.L. - All Money Is Legal
August 29	Daz Dillinger	R.A.W.
August 29	DJ Clue	Backstage: Music Inspired by the Film
August 29	Don Cisco	Oh Boy
August 29	L.V.	How Long
September 5	Mack 10	The Paper Route
September 5	C-Murder	Trapped in Crime
September 5	Aesop Rock	Float
September 12	50 Cent	Power of the Dollar
September 12	Afroman	Sell Your Dope
September 12	Cash Money Millionaires	Baller Blockin' (soundtrack)
September 12	LL Cool J	G.O.A.T. Featuring James T. Smith: The Greatest of All Time
September 12	Richie Rich	The Game
September 12	Too Short	You Nasty
September 12	Various Artists	Bait (soundtrack)
September 19	Cam'ron	S.D.E.
September 19	Nature	For All Seasons
September 19	Sean T	Heated
September 19	Tela	The World Ain't Enuff
September 26	The Black Eyed Peas	Bridging the Gap
September 26	Cella Dwellas	The Last Shall Be First
September 26	Mystikal	Let's Get Ready
September 26	Shyne	Shyne
September 26	Lil' Bow Wow	Beware of Dog
September 26	Phife Dawg	Ventilation: Da LP
September 26	Various Artists	Too Gangsta for Radio
September 30	Psychopathic Records	Psychopathics from Outer Space
October 3	T.W.D.Y.	Lead the Way
October 3	Eligh	Gas Dream
October 3	Soul Assassins	Soul Assassins II
October 3	Guru	Guru's Jazzmatazz, Vol. 3: Streetsoul
October 3	Scarface	The Last of a Dying Breed
October 3	Jedi Mind Tricks	Violent by Design
October 10	Afu-Ra	Body of the Life Force
October 10	E-40	Loyalty and Betrayal
October 10	Flesh-n-Bone	5th Dog Let Loose
October 10	Ja Rule	Rule 3:36
October 10	M.O.P.	Warriorz
October 10	Murs	Murs Rules the World
October 17	Everlast	Eat at Whitey's
October 17	Ludacris	Back for the First Time
October 17	Mausberg	Non Fiction
October 17	Reflection Eternal	Train of Thought
October 24	Souls of Mischief	Trilogy: Conflict, Climax, Resolution
October 24	Willie D	Loved by Few, Hated by Many
October 24	Young MC	Ain't Goin' Out Like That
October 31	Binary Star	Masters of the Universe
October 31	Various Artists	Damizza Presents Where I Wanna Be
October 31	The Cross Movement	Human Emergency
October 31	Insane Clown Posse	Bizzar/Bizaar
October 31	Jay-Z	The Dynasty: Roc La Familia
October 31	Three 6 Mafia	Underground Vol. 3: Kings of Memphis
October 31	OutKast	Stankonia
October 31	Popa Wu	Visions of the 10th Chamber
October 31	Quannum	SoleSides Greatest Bumps
October 31	Twiztid	Freek Show
October 31	Micranots	Obelisk Movements
October 31	Snoop Dogg	Dead Man Walkin'
November	Strings	The Black Widow
November 7	Necro	I Need Drugs
November 7	Outlawz	Ride wit Us or Collide wit Us
November 7	The Pharcyde	Plain Rap
November 7	Punchline & Wordsworth	Punch n' Words
November 13	Twiztid	Cryptic Collection
November 14	Prodigy	H.N.I.C.
November 14	Spice 1	The Playa Rich Project
November 14	Masters of Illusion	Masters of Illusion
November 21	Ill Will Records	Nas & Ill Will Records Presents QB's Finest
November 21	Wu-Tang Clan	The W
November 21	B.G.	Checkmate
November 21	Capone-N-Noreaga	The Reunion
November 21	8Ball & MJG	Space Age 4 Eva
November 21	Doggy's Angels	Pleezbaleevit!
November 21	Lil' O	Da Fat Rat wit da Cheeze
November 28	Master P	Ghetto Postage
November 28	Rawkus Records	Lyricist Lounge 2
December 5	Funkmaster Flex	The Mix Tape, Vol. IV
December 5	Memphis Bleek	The Understanding
December 5	AMG	Bitch Betta Have My Money 2001
December 12	Xzibit	Restless
December 12	South Park Mexican	Time Is Money
December 12	Various Artists	The Source Presents: Hip Hop Hits, Vol. 4
December 19	Lil Wayne	Lights Out
December 19	Various Artists	Save the Last Dance (soundtrack)
December 19	Snoop Dogg	Tha Last Meal

== Highest-charting singles ==
Hip hop singles from any year which charted in the 2000 Top 40 of the Billboard Hot 100
Song	Artist	Project	Peak position
"Thong Song"	Sisqó	Unleash the Dragon	3
"The Real Slim Shady"	Eminem	The Marshall Mathers LP	4
"Hot Boyz (Remix)"	Missy "Misdemeanor" Elliott featuring Nas, Eve & Q-Tip	Da Real World	5
"(Hot S**t) Country Grammar"	Nelly	Country Grammar	7
"I Just Wanna Love U (Give It To Me)"	Jay-Z	The Dynasty: Roc La Familia	11
"Shake Ya Ass"	Mystikal	Let’s Get Ready	13
"Danger (Been So Long)"	Mystikal featuring Nivea	Let’s Get Ready	14
"Wobble Wobble"	504 Boyz	Goodfellas	17
"Big Pimpin'"	Jay-Z featuring UGK	Vol. 3... Life and Times of S. Carter	18
"The Next Episode"	Dr. Dre featuring Snoop Dogg	2001	23
"Forgot About Dre"	Dr. Dre featuring Eminem	2001	25
"You Can Do It"	Ice Cube featuring Mack 10 & Ms. Toi	War & Peace Vol. 2 (The Peace Disc)	35
"Who Let the Dogs Out"	Baha Men	Who Let the Dogs Out	40

== Highest first-week sales ==
List of top ten albums with the highest first-week
Number	Album	Artist	1st-week sales	1st-week position
1	The Marshall Mathers LP	Eminem	1,760,000	1
2	The Dynasty: Roc La Familia	Jay-Z	558,000	1
3	Stankonia	Outkast	530,000	2
4	Tha Last Meal	Snoop Dogg	397,238	9
5	Let's Get Ready	Mystikal	330,000	1
6	The W	Wu-Tang Clan	301,000	5
7	BTNHResurrection	Bone Thugs-N-Harmony	280,000	2
8	Rule 3:36	Ja Rule	276,000	1
9	Ryde or Die Vol. 2	Various artists	254,000	2
10	Country Grammar	Nelly	235,000	3

== All critically reviewed albums ranked (Metacritic) ==
Number	Artist	Album	Average score	Number of reviews	Reference
1	Outkast	Stankonia	95	20 reviews	
2	Wu-Tang Clan	The W	80	17 reviews	
3	Eminem	The Marshall Mathers LP	78	21 reviews	
4	Jurassic 5	Quality Control	77	17 reviews	
5	De La Soul	Art Official Intelligence: Mosaic Thump	75	26 reviews	
6	Xzibit	Restless	75	11 reviews	
7	Black Eyed Peas	Bridging the Gap	74	9 reviews	
8	Mystikal	Let's Get Ready	74	7 reviews	
9	LL Cool J	G.O.A.T.	73	12 reviews	
10	Dilated Peoples	The Platform	69	11 reviews	
11	Wyclef Jean	The Ecleftic: 2 Sides II a Book	67	21 reviews	
12	Everlast	Eat at Whitey's	67	16 reviews	
13	Snoop Dogg	Tha Last Meal	65	10 reviews	
14	The Pharcyde	Plain Rap	65	6 reviews	
15	Canibus	2000 B.C.	60	9 reviews	
16	Master P	Ghetto Postage	57	6 reviews	
17	Ja Rule	Rule 3:36	56	5 reviews	

== See also ==
- Last article: 1999 in hip-hop
- Next article: 2001 in hip-hop
