= Hits (Spice 1 album) =

Greatest hits album by Spice 1
- Released: November 10, 1998
- Recorded: 1990–1998
- Genre: West Coast hip hop; gangsta rap
- Length: 70:58
- Label: Jive
- Producer: Ant Banks, Bigman, Blackjack, Chase, Clint "Payback" Sands, DJ Xtra Large, E-A-Ski & CMT, Femi Ojetunde, MC Eiht, Paris, Rick Rock, Spice 1

Spice 1 compilation chronology
Hits (1998)	The Playa Rich Project (2000)

Hits is the first greatest hits album by the American rapper Spice 1, released November 10, 1998, on Jive Records. The album features production by Ant Banks, Blackjack, Clint "Payback" Sands, E-A-Ski & CMT, MC Eiht, Paris, Rick Rock and Spice 1. It peaked at number 82 on the Billboard Top R&B/Hip-Hop Albums. The album has guest performances by 2Pac, MC Eiht, Method Man, and G-Nut of 187 Fac.

Hits was released in between two Spice 1 studio albums, The Black Bossalini (1997) and Immortalized (1999). The album features songs from all of his previous albums, plus two previously unreleased songs, "Balls 'N Brains" and "Nobody Want Work".

Hits is the first of three greatest hits compilations by Spice 1. Hits II: Ganked & Gaffled and Hits 3, were released in 2001 and 2002, respectively.

== Critical reception ==
Professional ratings
Review scores
Source	Rating
Allmusic	4/5 stars
Rap Pages	4/5 stars

A Rap Pages columnist wrote, "...He blessed the mic with a unique lyrical prowess.... It would be an injustice to exclude Spice 1 as one of the pioneers in the evolution of Bay Area Hip-Hop..."

== Track listing ==
1. "Welcome to the Ghetto" - 4:09 (from the album Spice 1)
2. "Trigga Gots No Heart" - 3:07 (from the album Menace II Society)
3. "The Murda Show" (featuring MC Eiht) - 4:27 (from the album 187 He Wrote)
4. "Balls 'N Brains" - 3:38 (previously unreleased)
5. "Dirty Bay" - 4:23 (from the album 1990-Sick)
6. "187 Proof" - 3:50 (from the album Spice 1)
7. "In My Neighborhood" - 3:42 (from the album Spice 1)
8. "Jealous Got Me Strapped" (featuring 2Pac) - 4:36 (from the album AmeriKKKa's Nightmare)
9. "Trigga Happy" - 3:11 (from the album 187 He Wrote)
10. "The Thug in Me" - 3:36 (from the album The Black Bossalini)
11. "1990-Sick (Kill 'Em All)" (featuring MC Eiht) - 4:28 (from the album 1990-Sick)
12. "Sucka Ass Niggas" (featuring G-Nut) - 3:20 (from the album 1990-Sick)
13. "Young Nigga" - 5:00 (from the album Spice 1)
14. "Dumpin' Em in Ditches" - 4:05 (from the album 187 He Wrote)
15. "Nobody Want Work" - 4:18 (previously unreleased)
16. "Hard to Kill" (featuring Method Man) - 4:07 (from the album AmeriKKKa's Nightmare)
17. "187 Pure" - 3:38 (from the album Spice 1)
18. "Wanna Be a G" - 3:23 (from the album The Black Bossalini)

== Samples ==
- "Welcome to the Ghetto"
  - "Inner City Blues" by Marvin Gaye
  - "No One's Gonna Love You" by Jimmy Jam and Terry Lewis
- "Dirty Bay"
  - "Sittin' On the Dock of the Bay" by Otis Redding
- In My Neighbourhood"
  - "Reach For It" by George Duke, B. Miller, N. Chancler and C.I. Johnson
- "Sucka Ass Niggas"
  - "Sucker M.C.'s" by Run–D.M.C.

== Chart history ==
Chart (1998)	Peak position
U.S. Billboard Top R&B/Hip-Hop Albums	82
