= The Playa Rich Project 2 =

Compilation album by Various Artists
- Released: January 22, 2002
- Genre: West Coast hip hop, rap, gangsta rap
- Length: 53:37
- Label: LGB Music Group
- Producer: Spice 1, Tone Tovin, Wyno

Spice 1 compilation chronology
Hits II (2001)	The Playa Rich Project 2 (2002)	Hits 3 (2002)

The Playa Rich Project 2 is a compilation presented by American rapper Spice 1. It was released January 22, 2002 on LGB Music Group. The album is a follow-up compilation to The Playa Rich Project, released in 2000. It features performances by Spice 1, E-40, Bad Azz, Kurupt, Outlawz, Big Tymers, Rappin' 4-Tay, Jayo Felony and E.S.G.

Several tracks were also released on Spiceberg Slim, including: "Lucky That I'm Rappin", "You Got Me Fucked Up", "That's OK" and "Turn the Heat Down". One song, "Here We Go Again", was also released on the Lil' Keke album, Birds Fly South.

The Playa Rich Project 2 was released in between two Spice 1 studio albums, The Last Dance (2000) and Spiceberg Slim (2002).

== Critical reception ==
Professional ratings
Review scores
Source	Rating
Allmusic	2.5/5 stars

Allmusic - "...Playa Rich Project 2 is a mix of rappers from both the mainstream and the underground. Featuring big names like (Spice 1), E-40, and Kurupt, this album mostly serves to showcase some of the lesser-known rappers in the business, including Captain Save 'Em, Lil' Keke, and Mr. Serv-On."

== Track listing ==
1. "Lucky That I'm Rappin'" (Spice 1 & Jayo Felony)
2. "Ain't Nothin to It But to Do It" (Bad Azz, Eastwood, Roscoe, Krooked Nation & Lil' J)
3. "Run and Duck" (Kurupt)
4. "Get Old" (Mr. Serv-On)
5. "I Be Him" (Spice 1)
6. "Millionaire Playas" (Big Tymers & T-Mac)
7. "Here We Go Again" (Lil' Keke)
8. "You Got Me Fucked Up" (Spice 1)
9. "That's OK" (Spice 1 & Rappin' 4-Tay)
10. "Sex Tonight" (E-40 & Captain Save'm)
11. "Trapped" (AK)
12. "You Think You Ain't" (Tucept)
13. "Hold It Up" (E.S.G., P.K.O. & Big Pokey)
14. "Turn the Heat Down" (Spice 1 & Outlawz)
