= 1990-Sick (Get 'Em All) =

Single by Spice 1 featuring MC Eiht

from the album 1990-Sick
- Released: October 30, 1995
- Recorded: 1995
- Genre: Gangsta rap, horrorcore
- Label: Jive Records
- Songwriters: Spice 1, MC Eiht, G. Reed
- Producer: Blackjack

"1990-Sick (Get 'Em All)" (AKA: "1990-Sick (Kill 'Em All)") is a 1995 song by Spice 1. It originally appeared on the album of the same name. The song features a guest verse from fellow West Coast rapper MC Eiht. The song would go on to reach #91 on the Billboard Hot R&B/Hip Hop Singles & Tracks chart and #18 on the Hot Rap Singles chart. Due to extreme amounts of profane language and violent content in the lyrics, the lyrics in the music video version for "1990-Sick" are heavily altered, to the point where the lyrics are unrecognizable when compared to the original uncensored album version. A version of the song without MC Eiht was also made and included on the 1990-Sick album. The song was released as a 12-inch single on October 30, 1995, and later appeared on Spice's 1998 greatest hits album Hits.
