= Boss Up =

Boss Up may refer to:

- "Boss Up", song by Criminalz and Spice 1 from Criminal Activity 2001
- "Boss Up", a song by Tyga, 2017
- Boss Up, a mixtape by Iamsu!, 2017
