= Thug Disease =

Compilation album by Spice 1
- Released: December 17, 2002
- Genre: West Coast hip hop, gangsta rap
- Length: 54:48
- Label: Rap Classics
- Producer: DJ Squeaky, Pimp C, Spice 1 (exec.)

Spice 1 compilation chronology
Hits 3 (2002)	Thug Disease (2002)	Life After Jive (2006)

Thug Disease is a compilation presented by American rapper Spice 1. It was released December 17, 2002, on Rap Classics, and also separately on Lovin' Paper Music Group. The album features guest performances by Kurupt, Bad Azz, Juvenile, MJG, Roscoe, Brotha Lynch Hung, and UGK.

Two tracks, "Muder Man Dance" and "Chocolate Philly", were previously released on the Spice 1 album, The Last Dance. One song, "Ballin", was previously released on the Lil' Keke album, Birds Fly South.

== Track listing ==
1. "Thug Disease" - 0:18
2. "Pimps, Players, Hustlers" - 4:15 (Spice 1, Roscoe, Low Lifes & Michelob)
3. "I'm Raw" - 3:06 (1 Da Boy)
4. "Muder Man Dance" - 4:32 (Spice 1 & UGK)
5. "Get Your Money" - 3:47 (Bad Azz & Low Lifes)
6. "Lights Off" - 3:51 (Brotha Lynch Hung & Black Cesar)
7. "Ballin" - 4:01 (Lil' Keke & Rally Boys)
8. "One Luv" - 3:35 (Spice 1 & C-Bo)
9. "Peep Whats Going On" - 4:07 (Fel Gognito & Bugsy Siegal)
10. "Double Up Again" - 3:47 (Kurupt)
11. "Chicken Fed" - 4:29 (Ghetto Mafia)
12. "I Like It Raw" - 3:48 (E-Class)
13. "I Keep Livin My Life" - 3:37 (Mr. Serv-On)
14. "Hold Tight" - 3:47 (Juvenile, Bomb Shell & Baby Capone)
15. "Chocolate Philly" - 4:18 (Spice 1 & MJG)
