= Strap on the Side =

Single by Spice 1

from the album AmeriKKKa's Nightmare
- Released: 1994
- Recorded: 1994
- Studio: Hyde Street Studios
- Genre: West Coast hip hop; gangsta rap; g-funk
- Length: 4:47
- Label: Jive
- Songwriter(s): L. Simmons, C. Wilson, R. Wilson, R. Taylor
- Producer(s): Blackjack

"Strap on the Side" is a song by American rapper Spice 1 from his 1994 album AmeriKKKa's Nightmare. The song peaked at #74 on the Hot R&B/Hip-Hop Singles & Tracks chart. In addition to an official maxi-single, a music video was released in 1994. The video features a cameo appearance by 2Pac. The song was later included on Spice 1's second greatest hits' album, Hits II: Ganked & Gaffled (2001).

== Charts ==
Song	Chart (1994)	Peak position
"Strap on the Side"	U.S. Billboard Hot R&B/Hip-Hop Songs	74
