= C-Bo's Best Appearances =

C-Bo's Best Appearances '91–'99

Compilation album by C-Bo
- Released: April 10, 2001
- Recorded: 1991–1999
- Genre: West Coast hip hop, gangsta rap, G-funk
- Length: 65:25
- Label: AWOL Records
- Producer: B.C., DJ Daryl, D-Wiz, Funk Daddy, Mike Mosley, One Drop Scott, Rick Rock, Sam Bostic, Studio Ton

C-Bo chronology
Enemy of the State (2000)	C-Bo's Best Appearances '91–'99 (2001)	Blocc Movement (2001)

C-Bo's Best Appearances '91–'99 is a compilation of previously released songs featuring American rapper C-Bo. It was released April 10, 2001 on AWOL Records. The songs originally appeared on other artists albums and compilations released throughout the nineties.

== Track listing ==
1. "Die Niggaz" - 3:54
2. "Deadly Weapon" (featuring Marvaless) - 3:51 (from the album Fearless)
3. "What's Going Down" (featuring Gelo) - 3:54 (from the album Havin' It My Way)
4. "The Funk Is On" (featuring Lunasicc & Marvaless) - 4:14 (from the album Mr. Lunasicc)
5. "Niggaz Get They Wig Split" (featuring B-Legit & Celly Cel) - 3:23 (from the album The Hemp Museum)
6. "That's How We Break Bread" (featuring King George & Master P) - 3:28 (from the album True)
7. "Ride 4 Me" (featuring Rod-Dee & Spice 1) - 4:27 (from the album The Playa Rich Project)
8. "Garden Block" - 5:44
9. "Riders" - 4:30 (from the album Boss Ballin' 2: The Mob Bosses)
10. "Danger Zone" (featuring Killa Tay & Mississippi) - 4:04 (from the album Fear No Fate)
11. "Rillas In Tha Game" (featuring LeMay & Marv Mitch) - 4:31 (from the album Livin In Tha Strange)
12. "Mafia Life" (featuring Killa Tay, Lunasicc, Mississippi & Pizzo) - 4:37 (from the album West Coast Trippin')
13. "It's on, on Sight" (featuring E-40) - 4:13 (from the album The Element of Surprise)
14. "Big Dawgs" (featuring J-Dubb, Killa Tay & O-Fed) - 4:29 (from the album Mr. Mafioso)
15. "Straight G'z" (featuring Pizzo) - 1:40 (from the album Heater Calhoun)
16. "Player to Player" (featuring Allie Baba & Mo-Jay) - 4:27 (from the album The Final Chapter)
