= Nuthin' but a Gangsta Party =

Compilation album by Various Artists
- Released: July 4, 2000
- Recorded: 1993–1999
- Genre: G-funk, gangsta rap, West Coast hip hop
- Length: 77:37
- Label: Priority Records
- Producer: Fredwreck, Fingazz, Crazy Toones, Dr. Dre, DJ U-Neek, Warren G, Ant Banks, Jesse West, Bink Dogg, Battlecat, DJ Pooh, Ice Cube, George Clinton, DJ Bobcat, Daz Dillinger, DJ Aladdin

Various Artists chronology
| Nuthin' but a Gangsta Party (2000) | Nuthin' but a Gangsta Party 2 (2001) |

Professional ratings
Review scores
| Source | Rating |
|---|---|
| AllMusic | 4/5 stars |

Nuthin' but a Gangsta Party is a compilation album, released by Priority Records on July 4, 2000. It is composed mainly of previously released songs on the label [with the exceptions of the first two tracks which were previously unreleased]. The album peaked at No. 67 on the Top R&B/Hip-Hop Albums chart and No. 155 on the Billboard 200. A sequel, entitled Nuthin' but a Gangsta Party 2, followed a year later.

== Track listing ==
1. Everybody Knows (Fred Wreck's House Party!!) (Kurupt Featuring Fredwreck)
2. I Love Cali (Roscoe)
3. Let It Reign (Westside Connection)
4. B Please (Snoop Dogg) Featuring Xzibit)
5. Where My Thugs At (Krayzie Bone)
6. I Want It All (Warren G Featuring Mack 10)
7. Players Holiday (Ant Banks presents T.W.D.Y. Featuring Too Short & Mac Mall)
8. What U See Is What U Get (Xzibit)
9. Girls All Pause (Kurupt)
10. Just Clownin' (WC)
11. We Be Puttin' It Down! [Remix] (Bad Azz Featuring Snoop Dogg)
12. Bop Gun (One Nation) (Edit) (Ice Cube Featuring George Clinton)
13. Keep Their Heads Ringin' (Dr. Dre)
14. Backyard Boogie (Mack 10)
15. Big Thangs (Ant Banks presents T.W.D.Y. Featuring Too Short & Ice Cube)
16. 2 of Amerikaz Most Wanted (2Pac Featuring Snoop Doggy Dogg)
17. Friday (Ice Cube)
18. Pay Ya Dues (Low Profile)
