= West Coast Bad Boyz, Vol. 3: Poppin' Collars =

West Coast Bad Boyz: Poppin' Collars

Compilation album by various artists
- Released: March 19, 2001
- Recorded: 2000−2001
- Genres: West Coast hip-hop; gangsta rap
- Length: 1:07:21
- Labels: No Limit; Universal
- Producers: Big Tray Deee; Broadway; DJ Silk; Benny Bloc; Fingazz; Fredwreck; Khayree; Kenny Caz; Lil' Lee; Loco Productions; Myke Diesel; Presidential Campaign; Sleep; Soopafly; Timbaland; Tone Toven

No Limit Records compilation albums chronology
Who U Wit? (1999)	West Coast Bad Boyz: Poppin' Collars (2001)

West Coast Bad Boyz series chronology
West Coast Bad Boyz II (1997)	West Coast Bad Boyz: Poppin' Collars (2001)

West Coast Bad Boyz: Poppin' Collars is a compilation album by American hip-hop record label No Limit Records, released on March 19, 2001 as the fourth and final installment in 'West Coast Bad Boyz' compilation series and the only one distributed via Universal Records. It features guest apparences from Snoop Dogg, Daz Dillinger, E-40, B-Legit, JT the Bigga Figga, Jayo Felony and others. The album debuted at number 108 on the Billboard 200 and number 28 on the Top R&B/Hip-Hop Albums charts in the United States.

== Track listing ==
No.	Title	Writer(s)	Producer(s)	Length
1.	"Pop Lockin' II" (performed by Snoop Dogg, E-40, Daz Dillinger, Master P, W.C., Silkk the Shocker & Goldie Loc)	Percy Miller; Vyshonn Miller; William Calhoun; Earl Stevens; Delmar Arnaud; Keiwan Spillman; Calvin Broadus; Priest Brooks; Ronald Hudson; Mikel Hooks; Roger Troutman; Larry Troutman	Soopafly	4:32
2.	"It's On" (performed by W.C. and Koupsta)	Calhoun; Koupsta	Broadway	4:12
3.	"Sick" (performed by E-40 and Suga-T)	E. Stevens; Tenina Stevens; Russell Brown	DJ Silk	3:34
4.	"Know About It" (featuring JT the Bigga Figga and Tha Gamblaz)	Joseph Thompson; Telly Mac; Devo Tha Commissiona	Benny Block	3:52
5.	"We Duez It Big" (performed by Gun City)	Ronnie Lewis; Kevin Laws; Lasseter William	Sleep	3:04
6.	"We Bust" (performed by Chico, Coolwadda and Dapadawn)	Vince V. Langston; Stacy Wagner; Dapadawn	Kenny Kas	4:10
7.	"What Y'all Want" (performed by Krazy and Snoop Dogg)	Michael Wilson; Broadus	Myke Diesel	3:14
8.	"The Matrix" (performed by Roscoe and Bad Azz)	David Williams; Jamarr Stamps	Fingazz	4:32
9.	"Hater-Aid" (performed by Jake Movez and Walter Goldstein)	Marcus Wells; Anthony Henderson	Tone Toven	3:54
10.	"It's Official" (performed by Blaqout)	Obi Nwobosi; Ainsoworth Prasad; Carlos Cortezz; Ruben Cruz; Evance Amdo	Presidential Campaign	4:12
11.	"Came Around" (performed by Jayo Felony and the Dulo Gang)	James Savage; Basheer Al'Uqdah; T. Smith	Loco Productions	4:44
12.	"Family Ties" (performed by Tha Gataz)	Edward Charles Bradford; Robert Lee Godwin; Lee Harris	Lil Lee	3:54
13.	"Poppin' Them Collars" (performed by Master P and Snoop Dogg)	P. Miller; Broadus; Jerry Long; Farid Nassar	Fredwreck	4:47
14.	"Nobody" (performed by Westside Connection)	Dedrick Rolison; O'Shea Jackson; Calhoun; Tim Mosley	Timbaland	5:10
15.	"The Final Outcome" (performed by Tha Eastsidaz)	Tracy Davis; Spillman	Tray Dee	4:29
16.	"Last Night" (performed by Brotha Lynch Hung)	Kevin Mann; Chris Mathias; Ramon Ross	Khayree	5:01
Total length:				1:07:21

Sample credits

- Track 1 contains replayed elements from "Pop Lockin'".

== Charts ==
Chart (2002)	Peak position
US Billboard 200	108
US Top R&B/Hip-Hop Albums (Billboard)	28
