= Nuthin' but a Gangsta Party 2 =

Compilation album by Various Artists
- Released: July 3, 2001
- Recorded: 1989–2001
- Genre: G-funk, gangsta rap, West Coast hip hop
- Length: 75:43
- Label: Priority Records
- Producer: Dr. Dre, Ant Banks, Timbaland, Young Tre, Mack 10, Fredwreck, DJ Quik, Carlos Stephens, XL, Ken Franklin, G-1, Robert Funksta Bacon, DJ Aladdin, Kurupt

Various Artists chronology
Nuthin' but a Gangsta Party (2000)	Nuthin' but a Gangsta Party 2 (2001)

Nuthin' but a Gangsta Party 2 is a compilation album released by Priority Records on July 3, 2001. Like its predecessor, It contains mostly previously released songs along with a few exclusive, previously unreleased songs. The album peaked at #85 on the Top R&B/Hip-Hop Albums chart. Got Ta Hustle, Make It Happen, and 4 Days In Cali are all previously unreleased and are exclusive to this album. The song Got Ta Hustle was released as a 12-inch single

== Critical reception ==
Jason Birchmeier of Allmusic wrote: Overall, there's little to complain about. Even the lesser artists turn in excellent performances, and while it's tempting to dismiss the No Limit songs for being out of place on a West Coast rap collection, the two chosen songs -- "Down for My N's" and "Got 'Em Fiending" -- both have an obvious West Coast sound to them. So what you have is 19 standout songs from Priority's vaults that illustrate everything that's wonderful about the West Coast gangsta sound. And, finally, it's also important to note that this isn't the aggressive side of gangsta rap, but rather the funky side of gangsta rap. The fact that Priority includes a classic like "Funky Song" rather than something from N.W.A, for example, perfectly illustrates the sort of vibe they're going for here

== Track listing ==
1. Who Am I? (What's My Name?) (Performed by Snoop Doggy Dogg)
2. Snoop Dogg (What's My Name II) (Performed by Snoop Dogg)
3. Hello (Performed By Ice Cube Featuring Dr. Dre & MC Ren)
4. Nuthin' but a 'G' Thang (Performed by Dr. Dre Featuring Snoop Doggy Dogg)
5. Got Ta Hustle (Performed by Ant Banks' TWDY Featuring MC Ren)
6. I Love Cali (In The Summertime) (G Party Mix) (Performed by Roscoe)
7. From Tha Streetz (Performed By Mack 10)
8. Who Ride Wit Us (Performed by Kurupt Featuring Daz)
9. G'd Up (Performed by Tha Eastsidaz Featuring Snoop Dogg)
10. If It Ain't Broke (Performed by Suga Free Featuring Mausberg)
11. Make It Happen (Performed by Tone Toven Featuring Kurupt)
12. 4 Days In Cali (Performed by RA The Rugged Man)
13. No More Questionz (Performed by Mausberg Featuring DJ Quik)
14. Oh Boy (Performed by Don Cisco Featuring Roscoe)
15. Down 4 My N's (Performed by C-Murder Featuring Snoop Dogg & Magic)
16. Got Em Fiending (Performed by Silkk The Shocker Featuring Master P)
17. If U Stay Ready (Performed by Suga Free)
18. Funky Song (Performed by Low Profile)
19. Never Leave Me Alone (Performed by Nate Dogg Featuring Snoop Dogg)
