= The Ridah =

Studio album by Spice 1
- Released: June 8, 2004
- Recorded: 2004
- Genres: Hardcore rap Gangsta rap
- Label: Independent Warrior
- Producers: Spice 1, Battlecat, Iklectix, J. Buddah (Joe Bartone), Rahxx, Trev Jr.

Spice 1 chronology
Spiceberg Slim (2002)	The Ridah (2004)	The Pioneers (2004)

Professional ratings
Review scores
Source	Rating
RapReviews	6.5/10 stars

The Ridah is the ninth studio album of US rapper Spice 1. Keith Andrews, Travis Wilcox, and Robert Green "Spice 1" partnered up with Rajan Dave to produce it under XtraLaced Records, LLC. "Work It Tonite" track 1, a Punjabi East Indian Crossover, was produced by Manesh Judge & Noor Lodhi of Cold Fusion featuring Barinder Judge on vocals, in association with Xtralaced. XtraLaced Records, LLC was dissolved in 2004 and The Ridah was released June 8, 2004 on Independent Warrior Records.

== Track listing ==
1. "Work It Tonite" – 3:59 feat. Barinder Judge
2. "Cutthroat Game" – 4:10
3. "Still Here" – 3:53
4. "Behind Closed Doors" – 3:56
5. "Gangbang Music" feat. Tha Eastsidaz – 4:09
6. "Reckless Eyeballin'" – 3:40
7. "Nature to Ride" – 3:43
8. "Kizz My Azz" – 3:22
9. "Pimp Pizzle" feat. Dru Down – 4:33
10. "Cutthroat Game, Pt. 2" – 3:54
11. "Boomin Pistols" – 3:04
12. "Thug World" feat. Kurupt – 3:26
13. "1 in a Million" – 3:20
14. "U Gotta Take It (One Day at a Time)" feat. 2Pac, LP & Headstrong – 3:55
15. "Behind Closed Doors, Pt. 2" – 4:02
16. "I'm a Boss" – 3:51
17. "Pimp Pizzle (Radio Mix)" feat. Dru Down – 4:33

== Chart history ==
Chart (2004)	Peak position
U.S. Billboard Top R&B/Hip-Hop Albums	89
