= The Playa Rich Project =

Compilation album by Various Artists
- Released: November 14, 2000
- Genre: West Coast hip hop, rap, gangsta rap
- Length: 55:19
- Label: Mobb Status Ent.
- Producer: Poetic 1 (exec.), Spice 1 (exec.)

Spice 1 compilation chronology
Hits (1998)	The Playa Rich Project (2000)	Hits II (2001)

The Playa Rich Project is a compilation presented by American rapper Spice 1. It was released November 14, 2000 on Mobb Status Entertainment. The album features performances by Spice 1, Yukmouth, RBL Posse, C-Bo, Outlawz, Jayo Felony, Tray Dee, Three 6 Mafia, B-Legit, Hot Boyz and Yukmouth.

The song, "Ride or Die", was later re-released on the 2001 Criminalz album Criminal Activity. Another song, "Ride 4 Me", was also re-released in 2001, on the C-Bo compilation album, C-Bo's Best Appearances.

== Critical reception ==
Professional ratings
Review scores
Source	Rating
Allmusic	2.5/5 stars

Allmusic - "...sporting some of the rugged, hardcore gangsta rappers we expect...it's still the same gangsta tales laid on staccato funk grooves that has made Spice 1 so famous on the West Coast gangsta rap scene."

== Track listing ==
1. "Touch Me/Feel Me/Smell Me" (Spice 1)
2. "Servin' It Hot" (Hot Boyz, Big Tymers & Servin' tha World Click)
3. "Ain't Your Average" (Outlawz)
4. "Ready 4 War" (Mr. Serv-On & Court Dog)
5. "Art of War" (RBL Posse & Playaz on da Run)
6. "Face Down" (Three 6 Mafia)
7. "Ride or Die" (Spice 1, Tray Dee, Jayo Felony & Yukmouth)
8. "As Real As They Come" (Ghetto Mafia)
9. "Down Wit' Us" (Riderlife)
10. "East Bay Anthem" (3 Way Funk)
11. "Hollar at Me" (B-Legit & Sean T)
12. "Playaz Paradise" (No Good)
13. "You Can't Tell Me" (2-Ton)
14. "Ride 4 Me" (C-Bo, Rod-Dee & Spice 1)
