= Criminalz =

American hip hop group

- Origin: San Francisco Bay Area, California, U.S.
- Genres: West Coast hip hop, gangsta rap
- Years active: 2001–present
- Label: Realside Records
- Members: Spice 1 Celly Cel

Criminalz is an American rap group that consists of West Coast rappers Celly Cel, Spice 1, and Jayo Felony. The group was thrown together in hope of creating a supergroup of hard West Coast rappers by a couple of record labels in California. The group released their debut album Criminal Activity in 2001 for Realside Records. The album found only limited success, making it to number 57 on the Top R&B/Hip-Hop album charts and number 26 on the Independent album charts.

== Discography ==
Album information
Criminal Activity
- Released: August 7, 2001
- Chart positions: #57 Top R&B/Hip-Hop, #26 Independent
- Last RIAA certification: Gold
- Singles: "Boss Up", "Niggaz Like Us"
