= Crip Hop =

Studio album by Jayo Felony
- Released: October 23, 2001
- Genre: West Coast hip hop; gangsta rap
- Length: 1:03:34
- Label: American Music Corporation
- Producer: Caviar; Overdose; Ty Fyffe; DJ Silk; Rick Rock; Sandlofer Music; DJ Battlecat; K-Def; Soopafly; Chevvy; Ecay Uno; Ghetto Warden; Flip Matrix

Jayo Felony chronology
Underground (1999)	Crip Hop (2001)

Professional ratings
Review scores
Source	Rating
Allmusic	2.5/5 stars

Crip Hop is the fourth studio album by San Diego–based American rapper Jayo Felony. It was released on October 23, 2001, via American Music Corporation. The nineteen-track record was produced by DJ Battlecat, K-Def, Rick Rock, Soopafly, Ty Fyffe, Caviar, Chevvy, Flip Matrix, Ghetto Warden, Overdose, Sandlofer Music, and DJ Silk. Fellow rappers E-40, Spice 1, Baby Skar, Tiggi Diamonds, Young Crook, Young Nube, and Dulo Gang made guest appearances on the album. It was an improvement over his last album, Underground, making it to number 53 on the Top R&B/Hip-Hop Albums chart and number ten on the Top Independent Albums chart and featuring the hit single "She Loves Me".

== Track listing ==
No.	Title	Producer(s)	Length
1.	"Intro"		1:30
2.	"Gang Bangin Shit" (featuring Spice1)	Rick Rock	2:38
3.	"One Shot Kill"	Ty Fyffe	3:02
4.	"Girls & Boys" (featuring Ticky Diamondz)	Sandlofer Music	4:11
5.	"What Ya Need"	DJ Battlecat	3:45
6.	"Trued Up Remix (Real Anthem)" (featuring Baby Skar)	K-Def	3:25
7.	"Swing"	Caviar; Overdose	3:31
8.	"Skit I"		0:22
9.	"Hurt That Nigga" (featuring Soopafly)	Soopafly	3:42
10.	"Skit II"		0:37
11.	"Do You Love Life"	Caviar; Overdose	4:53
12.	"Please Believe It" (featuring E-40)	Caviar; Overdose	4:39
13.	"Sherm Sticc III"	Ty Fyffe	3:51
14.	"Hotta Than Fish Grease" (featuring Young Crook)	DJ Silk	3:45
15.	"Catch 'Em In The Morning"	Chevvy	3:14
16.	"You's A Character"	DJ Silk	3:52
17.	"Came Round" (featuring Dulo Gang)	Ecay Uno	4:45
18.	"I Walk & Skip"	Ghetto Warden	4:14
19.	"She Loves Me" (featuring Young Nube)	Flip Matrix	3:38
Total length:			1:03:34

Notes

- †Song "Catch 'Em In The Morning" is a diss track towards Jay-Z, Beanie Sigel and Memphis Bleek
- †Song "You's A Character" is a diss track towards Snoop Dogg and Kokane

Samples

- Track 7 contains samples from "Here I Come (Broader Than Broadway)" performed by Barrington Levy (1985)
- Track 13 contains samples from "Will You Cry (When You Hear This Song)" by Chic (1979)

== Personnel ==
- Chago Williams – backing vocals (track 17)
- Earl Stevens – guest artist (track 12)
- Floyd Wilcox – producer (track 19)
- James Savage – main artist
- Kannon Cross – producer (tracks: 7, 11–12)
- Kevin Gilliam – producer (track 5)
- Kevin Hansford – producer (track 6)
- Priest Joseph Brooks – guest artist & producer (track 9)
- Ricardo Thomas – producer (track 2)
- Robert Lee Green, Jr. – guest artist (track 2)
- Russell Brown – producer (tracks: 14, 16)
- Tikki Diamond – guest artist (track 4)
- Tyrone Gregory Fyffe – producer (tracks: 3, 13)
- William Moore – producer (tracks: 7, 11–12)
- Willy Sweetback – guitar (track 11)
- Baby Skar – guest artist (track 6)
- Chevvy – producer (track 15)
- Dulo Gang – guest artist (track 17)
- Ecay Uno – producer (track 17)
- Ghetto Warden – producer (track 18)
- Sandlofer Music – producer (track 4)
- Young Crook – guest artist (track 14)
- Young Nube – guest artist (track 19)

== Charts ==
Chart (2001)	Peak position
Billboard Top R&B/Hip-Hop Albums	53
Billboard Independent Albums	10
