= The Black Bossalini =

The Black Bossalini (a.k.a. Dr. Bomb from da Bay)

Studio album by Spice 1
- Released: October 28, 1997
- Studio: The Crackhouse (New York City); Echo Sound (Los Angeles); The Cosmic Slop Shop (Sacramento, Calif.); Scarface; Badass Beat Lab; Chris Biondo
- Genre: West Coast hip hop; gangsta rap; g-funk
- Length: 58:17
- Label: Jive
- Producer: Paris; Ali Malek; Ant Banks; Femi Ojetunde; Rick Rock; Clint "Payback" Sands; Hen-Gee; Mike Mosley; Bobby Ross Avila (co.)

Spice 1 chronology
1990-Sick (1995)	The Black Bossalini (a.k.a. Dr. Bomb from da Bay) (1997)	Immortalized (1999)

Singles from The Black Bossalini
- 1. "510, 213" / "Ballin'" / "I'm High" Released: September 22, 1997; 2. "Playa Man" Released: December 6, 1997

The Black Bossalini (a.k.a. Dr. Bomb from da Bay) is the fifth studio album by American rapper Spice 1. It was released on October 28, 1997, via Jive Records. The album was produced by Ant Banks, Paris, Rick Rock, Ali Malek, Clint "Payback" Sands, Femi Ojetunde, Hen-Gee, and Mike Mosley. It features guest appearances from Big Syke, Ice-T, Kokane, Mack 10, MC Breed, Too $hort, WC, and Yukmouth. The album peaked at number 28 on the Billboard 200 chart and at number 5 on the Billboard Top R&B/Hip-Hop Albums chart in the United States.

The album spawned two singles: a promo single "510, 213 / Ballin' / I'm High" and "Playa Man", but none of them made it to Billboard charts. A music video was shot for the song "Playa Man". The song "2 Hands & a Razorblade" was originally heard in the 1997 film Dangerous Ground and was also included on the film's soundtrack.

== Critical reception ==
Professional ratings
Review scores
Source	Rating
AllMusic	3/5 stars
The Source	3/5 stars

Stephen Thomas Erlewine, in his review for AllMusic, wrote: "There are a couple of Southern Californian flourishes here and there...it's a solid record that should appeal to his legions of fans."

== Track listing ==
No.	Title	Writer(s)	Producer(s)	Length
1.	"The Thug in Me" (Dedicated to Tupac Shakur)	R. Green, Jr.; O. Jackson, Jr.	Paris	3:36
2.	"I'm High"	R. Green, Jr.; O. Jackson, Jr.	Paris	4:02
3.	"Recognize Game" (featuring Too $hort, Ice-T & Kokane)	R. Green, Jr.; T. Shaw; T. Marrow; A. Banks; L. Simmons; R. Taylor; C. Wilson; R. Wilson	Ant Banks	4:03
4.	"Playa Man" (featuring Da Old Skool)	R. Green, Jr.; O. Jackson, Jr.	Paris	4:07
5.	"Caught Up in My Gunplay"	R. Green, Jr.; O. Jackson, Jr.	Paris	3:28
6.	"Ballin'" (featuring Yukmouth & MC Breed)	R. Green, Jr.; J. Ellis; H. Garcia; B. Avila	Hen-Gee; Bobby Ross Avila (co.)	4:51
7.	"The Boss Mobsta"	R. Green, Jr.; C. Sands	Clint "Payback" Sands	4:46
8.	"510, 213" (featuring WC & Big Syke)	R. Green, Jr.; T. Himes; W. Calhoun; F. Ojetunde; M. Mosley; S. Wonder	Mike Mosley; Femi Ojetunde	3:54
9.	"Kill Street Blues"	R. Green, Jr.; R. Thomas	Rick Rock	5:12
10.	"Fetty Chico and the Mack" (featuring Mack 10)	R. Green, Jr.; D. Rollison; A. Banks	Ant Banks	4:06
11.	"Wanna Be a G"	R. Green, Jr.; R. Thomas; F. Ojetunde	Rick Rock; Femi Ojetunde	3:23
12.	"Diamonds"	R. Green, Jr.; A. Malek	Ali Malek	4:04
13.	"Down Payment on Heaven" (featuring Cydal)	R. Green, Jr.; A. Malek	Ali Malek	4:31
14.	"2 Hands & a Razorblade"	R. Green, Jr.; O. Jackson, Jr.	Paris	4:14
Total length:				58:17

== Sample credits ==
510 / 213

- "That Girl" by Stevie Wonder

Caught Up in My Gunplay

- "Anger" by Marvin Gaye

Down Payment on Heaven

- "(Pop, Pop, Pop, Pop) Goes My Mind" by LeVert

Playa Man

- "Virgin Man" by Smokey Robinson

Recognize Game

- "Humpin'" by the Gap Band

The Boss Mobsta

- "Friends" by Whodini

The Thug in Me

- "Turn Your Love Around" by George Benson

== Chart history ==
Chart (1997)	Peak position
US Billboard 200	28
US Top R&B/Hip-Hop Albums (Billboard)	5
