= Criminal Activity =

Studio album by Criminalz
- Released: August 7, 2001
- Recorded: 2001
- Studio: Find a Way (Hayward, California)
- Genre: West Coast hip hop; hardcore rap; gangsta rap
- Length: 45:50
- Label: Realside
- Producer: Doyle; G-Man Stan; Spice 1

Celly Cel chronology
Deep Conversation (2000)	Criminal Activity (2001)	It'z Real Out Here (2005)

Spice 1 chronology
The Last Dance (2000)	Criminal Activity (2001)	Spiceberg Slim (2002)

Criminal Activity is the only studio album by American rap supergroup Criminalz, which consisted of Spice 1 and Celly Cel. It was released on August 7, 2001, via Celly Cel's label, Realside Records. The album was produced by Doyle, G-Man Stan, and Spice 1. It peaked at number 57 on the Billboard Top R&B/Hip-Hop Albums and number 26 on the Billboard Independent Albums. The album features guest performances by Yukmouth, Tray Dee, Sylk-E. Fyne, and Bun B.

One song, "Boss Up", was previously released on the Spice 1 compilation The Playa Rich Project.

== Critical reception ==
Professional ratings
Review scores
Source	Rating
AllMusic	1.5/5 stars
RapReviews	4/10

AllMusic - "Everyone was expecting a lot from this group from the first time it was mentioned...For many reasons this just doesn't work...It seems like they all wrote their verses independently of one another, then rapped in whatever order they felt like it. There's no fluid feel...as a whole this definitely falls short of any of their solo work."

RapReviews - "...Most rap groups who made great albums needed guidance to make those great albums. The Criminalz definitely lack a mastermind to weld the three of them together and make them realize their synergies...There are almost no ad-libs, there's no interacting, it might as well be that these three never were in the same studio together..."

== Track listing ==
No.	Title	Producer(s)	Length
1.	"Lockdown" (Intro)		1:01
2.	"Criminal Activity" (performed by Celly Cel)	G-Man Stan	1:43
3.	"Ridaz" (performed by Celly Cel, Spice 1 and Jayo Felony)	G-Man Stan	4:16
4.	"Puttin' In Work" (performed by Jayo Felony, Celly Cel and Spice 1)	Doyle	4:31
5.	"Niggaz Like Us" (performed by Celly Cel, Spice 1 and Bun B)	Doyle	4:34
6.	"My Life" (performed by Jayo Felony, Spice 1 and Celly Cel)	Doyle	4:23
7.	"Boss Up" (performed by Spice 1, Jayo Felony, Big Tray Deee and Yukmouth)	Spice 1	4:26
8.	"Doin' It Big" (performed by Celly Cel, Spice 1 and Sylk-E. Fyne)	Doyle	4:22
9.	"The Real World" (performed by Celly Cel, Spice 1 and Jayo Felony)	Doyle	4:07
10.	"Reminisce" (performed by Spice 1, Celly Cel and Jayo Felony)	Doyle	4:49
11.	"What They Hittin' Fo?" (performed by Spice 1, Celly Cel and Jayo Felony)	G-Man Stan	4:23
12.	"Rollin' wit My Folks" (performed by Spice 1 and Celly Cel)	Doyle	3:14
Total length:			45:50

== Chart history ==
Chart (2001)	Peak position
U.S. Billboard Independent Albums	26
U.S. Billboard Top R&B/Hip-Hop Albums	57

== Personnel ==
- Bernard Freeman – performer (track 5)
- Doyle – producer (tracks: 4–6, 8–10, 12)
- "G-Man" Stan Keith – producer (tracks: 2–3, 11), mixing & recording
- James Savage – performer (tracks: 3–4, 6–7, 9–11)
- Jerold Dwight Ellis III – performer (track 7)
- Joi Patrice – background vocals (track 6)
- J.R. – background vocals (tracks: 8, 10)
- La'Mar Lorraine Johnson – performer (track 8)
- Marcellus McCarver – performer (tracks: 2–6, 8–12), executive producer
- Robert Lee Green, Jr. – performer (tracks: 3–12), producer (track 7)
- Tracy Lamar Davis – performer (track 7)
