= 1990-Sick =

Studio album by Spice 1
- Released: December 5, 1995
- Recorded: December 1994 – April 1995
- Genres: West Coast hip-hop; gangsta rap
- Length: 1:06:38
- Label: Jive
- Producers: Ant Banks; Blackjack; Bosko; Chase; Clint "Payback" Sands

Spice 1 chronology
AmeriKKKa's Nightmare (1994)	1990-Sick (1995)	The Black Bossalini (1997)

Singles from 1990-Sick
- 1. "1990-Sick (Kill 'Em All)" Released: October 24, 1995; 2. "Ain't No Love" Released: January 8, 1996

Professional ratings
Review scores
Source	Rating
AllMusic	4/5 stars
The Source	3/5 stars

1990-Sick is the fourth full-length studio album by American rapper Spice 1. It was released on December 5, 1995, via Jive Records. Produced by Chase, Blackjack, Bosko, Ant Banks and Clint "Payback" Sands, it features contributions from E-40, MC Eiht, Young Kyoz, G-Nut, Joya and Kokane. In the United States, the album peaked at number 30 on the Billboard 200 and number 3 on the Top R&B/Hip-Hop Albums charts. Its lead single, "1990-Sick (Get 'Em All)", made it to number 91 on the Hot R&B/Hip-Hop Songs and number 18 on the Hot Rap Songs.

Along with singles, music videos were released for two songs: "1990-Sick (Get 'Em All)" featuring MC Eiht, and an alternate version of "Ain't No Love" featuring Levitti on the chorus instead of Joya. G-Nut makes a cameo appearance in "1990-Sick (Get 'em All)".

== Background ==
After wrapping up recording 1990-Sick, Spice turned himself in to Oakland police. The rapper was forced to lie low during the summer of 1995 while making the album, since police were armed with a warrant for his arrest on illegal weapons charges. In between hiding and recording, he made a video for his first single, "1990-Sick (Get 'em All)". After serving two weeks in prison, he was released due to overcrowding.

== Critical reception ==
AllMusic's Stephen Thomas Erlewine stated: "much of the record suffers from unimaginative production and standard musical ideas, but Spice 1 is an engaging rapper -- he is talented enough to disguise the weaknesses in the music with his verbal skills". Raymond Cunningham of The Source concluded: "the way he switches flows from semi-automatic fire to fully automatic is enough to make you overlook the weak points of the CD. Spice may be 1990-SICK, but he's still 187-Pure".

== Track listing ==
No.	Title	Writer(s)	Producer(s)	Length
1.	"1990-Sick (Kill 'Em All)" (featuring MC Eiht)	Robert Lee Greene Jr.; Aaron Tyler; Gentry Reed	Blackjack	4:28
2.	"Dirty Bay"	Greene Jr.; Etienne Clark	Chase	4:23
3.	"Mind of a Sick Nigga"	Greene Jr.; Bosco Kante	Bosko	4:59
4.	"Drama"	Greene Jr.; Clinton Sands	Clint "Payback" Sands	4:50
5.	"Mobbin'"	Greene Jr.; Reed	Blackjack	4:21
6.	"Survival"	Greene Jr.; Clark	Chase	3:31
7.	"Tales of the Niggas Who Got Crept On"	Greene Jr.; Reed	Blackjack	4:05
8.	"Sucka Ass Niggas"	Greene Jr.; Anthony Banks	Ant Banks	3:20
9.	"Faces of Death"	Greene Jr.; Kante	Bosko	4:30
10.	"1-800 (Straight from the Pen)"	Greene Jr.; Clark	Chase	4:21
11.	"Ain't No Love"	Greene Jr.; Clark; Lionel Cole	Chase	4:19
12.	"Funky Chickens"	Greene Jr.; Kante	Bosko	5:40
13.	"Snitch Killas"	Greene Jr.; Banks	Ant Banks	5:00
14.	"Can U Feel It" (featuring E-40)	Greene Jr.; Earl Stevens; Kevin Crockett; Sands	Clint "Payback" Sands	4:40
15.	"1990-Sick (Kill 'Em All)"	Greene Jr.; Reed	Blackjack	4:11
Total length:				1:06:38

Sample credits

- Track 2 contains an interpolation of "(Sittin' On) The Dock of the Bay" written by Otis Redding.
- Track 3 contains a sample of "Friends" written by Jalil Hutchins and Lawrence Smith and performed by Whodini.
- Track 8 contains an interpolation and a sample of "Sucker M.C.'s" written by Darryl McDaniels, Joseph Simmons and Lawrence Smith.
- Track 13 contains an interpolation of "Pusherman" written by Curtis Mayfield.

== Personnel ==
- Robert Lee "Spice 1" Greene Jr. – vocals
- Aaron "MC Eiht" Tyler – vocals (track 1)
- Jerry "Kokane" Long Jr. – background vocals (track 4)
- Gregory "G-Nut" Brown – vocals (track 8)
- Joya Owens – background vocals (track 10)
- Quintin "Gruve" Washington – background vocals (track 13)
- Anthony "Ant" Banks – background vocals (track 13), keyboards, drum programming, producer & mixing (tracks: 8, 13)
- Earl "E-40" Stevens – vocals (track 14)
- Kevin "Young Kyoz" Crockett – vocals (track 14)
- Rick Cousins – background vocals (track 14)
- Audra Cunningham – background vocals (track 14)
- Stan "The Guitar Man" Jones – guitar (tracks: 1, 5, 7, 14, 15), bass (tracks: 1, 15)
- Gentry "Black Jack" Reed – keyboards & producer (tracks: 1, 5, 7, 15), drum programming (tracks: 1, 15), mixing (tracks: 5, 7)
- J.C. – guitar (track 2)
- Tim Fox – guitar (tracks: 2, 6, 10, 11)
- David Brown – bass (tracks: 2, 6, 10, 11)
- Grant William Nicholas – keyboards (tracks: 2, 6, 10)
- Etienne "Chase" Clark – keyboards (tracks: 2, 6, 10), producer (tracks: 2, 6, 10, 11)
- Bosko Kante – keyboards, drum programming, producer, engineering & mixing (tracks: 3, 9, 12)
- Clinton "Mr. Payback" Sands – keyboards & drums (track 4), producer & mixing (tracks: 4, 14)
- Lionel Cole – keyboards (track 11)
- Mark Cross – keyboards (track 14)
- Carlos Warlick – recording (tracks: 1, 14, 15), mixing (tracks: 5, 7, 14)
- Ryan Arnold – recording (tracks: 1, 14, 15)
- Bob Wartinbee – recording & mixing (tracks: 2, 6, 10, 11)
- Alex Reed – recording (track 4)
- James Mansfield – recording (track 4)
- Michael Hersh – recording (tracks: 5, 7)
- Patrick Coughlin – recording (tracks: 5, 7)
- Stan Keith – recording (tracks: 5, 7)
- Gabriel Sutter – mixing (tracks: 1, 15)
- Keston Wright – mixing (track 4)
- Trevor Ward – mixing (tracks: 8, 13)
- Tom Coyne – mastering
- Chaz Hayes – executive producer, management

== Charts ==
=== Weekly charts ===
Chart (1995)	Peak position
US Billboard 200	30
US Top R&B Albums (Billboard)	3

=== Year-end charts ===
Chart (1996)	Position
US Top R&B/Hip-Hop Albums (Billboard)	71
