= AmeriKKKa's Nightmare =

Studio album by Spice 1
- Released: November 22, 1994
- Studio: Hyde Street; Live Oak; Dangerous Music; Cherokee; Blue Palm
- Genre: West Coast hip-hop; gangsta rap; G-funk
- Length: 1:06:02
- Label: Jive
- Producer: Ant Banks; Blackjack; DJ Battlecat; DJ Slip; Spice 1

Spice 1 chronology
187 He Wrote (1993)	AmeriKKKa's Nightmare (1994)	1990-Sick (1995)

Singles from AmeriKKKa's Nightmare
- 1. "Strap on the Side" Released: October 31, 1994

Professional ratings
Review scores
Source	Rating
AllMusic	3/5 stars

AmeriKKKa's Nightmare is the third studio album by American rapper Spice 1. It was released November 22, 1994, via Jive Records. The recording sessions took place at Hyde Street Studios, Live Oak Studios, Dangerous Music Studios, Cherokee Studios, and Blue Palm Studios. The album was produced by Blackjack, Ant Banks, DJ Battlecat, DJ Slip, and Spice 1, who also served as executive producer with Chaz Hayes. It features guest appearances from 187 Fac, 2Pac, E-40, and Method Man.

The album peaked at number 22 on the Billboard 200 and number 2 on the Top R&B/Hip-Hop Albums charts in the United States. It was certified Gold by the Recording Industry Association of America on January 24, 1995, for selling over 500,000 copies in the US.

It was supported with a single "Strap on the Side", which made it to No. 74 on the US Billboard Hot R&B/Hip-Hop Songs, and a promotional single "Face of a Desperate Man". Accompanying music videos were directed for both songs, within 2Pac made a cameo appearance on "Strap on the Side" and G-Nut's cameo on "Face of a Desperate Man". The song "Nigga Sings the Blues" was originally heard in Doug McHenry's 1994 film Jason's Lyric and was also included in Jason's Lyric (The Original Motion Picture Soundtrack).

== Track listing ==
No.	Title	Writer(s)	Producer(s)	Length
1.	"D-Boyz Got Love for Me" (featuring E-40)	Robert L. Green Jr.; Earl Stevens; Gentry Reed	Blackjack	5:04
2.	"Face of a Desperate Man"	Green Jr.; Anthony Banks	Ant Banks	4:53
3.	"Strap on the Side"	Lonnie Simmons; Charlie Wilson; Robert Lynn Wilson; Ronnie Wilson; Rudy Taylor	Blackjack	4:47
4.	"Jealous Got Me Strapped" (featuring 2Pac)	Green Jr.; Tupac Shakur; Reed	Blackjack	4:36
5.	"Tell Me What That Mail Like"	Green Jr.; Reed	Blackjack	4:04
6.	"Doncha Runaway"	Green Jr.; Banks; Ramone Gooden	Ant Banks	4:56
7.	"Hard to Kill" (featuring Method Man)	Green Jr.; Clifford Smith; Reed	Blackjack	4:07
8.	"Nigga Sings the Blues" (Blackjack's Version)	Green Jr.; Reed; Stan Jones	Blackjack	3:19
9.	"You Can Get the Gat for That"	Green Jr.	Spice 1	4:18
10.	"Bustas Can't See Me"	Green Jr.; Kevin Gilliam	DJ Battlecat	4:25
11.	"Murder Ain't Crazy"	Green Jr.; Reed	Blackjack	4:36
12.	"Stickin' to the "G" Code"	Green Jr.; Terry K. Allen	DJ Slip	3:47
13.	"Give the "G" a Gat" (featuring G-Nut)	Green Jr.; Banks; Gooden	Ant Banks	5:30
14.	"Three Strikes"	Green Jr.; Reed	Blackjack	4:30
15.	"You Done Fucked Up"	Green Jr.; Banks; Gooden	Ant Banks	3:10
Total length:				1:06:02

Sample credits

- Track 3 contains a portion of the composition "I Don't Believe You Want to Get up and Dance (Oops!)" written by Lonnie Simmons, Charlie Wilson, Robert Lynn Wilson, Ronnie Wilson and Rudy Taylor.
- Track 6 contains a sample of "You Can't Runaway" written by James Alexander, Larry Dodson, Allen Jones and Winston Stewart and performed by the Bar-Kays.
- Track 12 contains a sample of "Mr. Groove" written by Kevin McCord and performed by One Way.

== Personnel ==
- Robert L. "Spice 1" Green Jr. — vocals, producer (track 9), co-producer (tracks: 1–8, 10–15), executive producer
- Earl "E-40" Stevens — vocals (track 1)
- Tupac "2Pac" Shakur — vocals (track 4)
- Clifford "Method Man" Smith Jr. — vocals (track 7)
- Gregory "G-Nut" Brown — vocals (track 13), background vocals (track 9)
- Levander — background vocals (track 8)
- Howard Johnson — background vocals (track 10)
- Rosa Knight — background vocals (track 12)
- Frank J. — background vocals (track 15)
- Dennis "Den Fen" Thomas — background vocals (track 15)
- Anthony "Ant" Banks — background vocals (track 15), producer, recording & mixing (tracks: 2, 6, 13, 15)
- "G-Man" Stan Keith — guitar (tracks: 1, 3–5)
- Gentry "Black Jack" Reed — producer (tracks: 1, 3–5, 7, 8, 11, 14)
- Ramon "Pee-Wee" Gooden — guitar (tracks: 6, 13, 15), keyboards (tracks: 13, 15)
- Stan "The Guitar Man" Jones — guitar (tracks: 7, 8, 11, 14)
- Kevin "DJ Battlecat" Gilliam — producer (track 10)
- Horace Coleman — guitar (track 12)
- William "Willie Z" Zimmerman — keyboards (track 12)
- Terry "DJ Slip" Allen — producer & mixing (track 12)
- Dave "D-Wiz" Evelingham — recording (tracks: 1, 3, 9), mixing (tracks: 1, 5, 12)
- Bruce Leighton — recording (tracks: 1, 3–5)
- Josh Azhziger — recording (tracks: 7, 11, 14), mixing (tracks: 3, 4, 7, 8, 11, 14)
- Gabriel Sutter — recording & mixing (track 10)
- Eric Janko — recording (tracks: 11, 12), mixing (tracks: 3–5, 8, 11)
- Brian "Big Bass" Gardner — mastering
- Chaz Hayes — executive producer, management
- Victor Hall — design, photography
- Edwin Ruiz — design

== Charts ==
=== Weekly charts ===
Chart (1994)	Peak position
US Billboard 200	22
US Top R&B Albums (Billboard)	2

=== Year-end charts ===
Chart (1995)	Position
US Billboard 200	165
US Top R&B Albums (Billboard)	31

== Certifications ==
Region	Certification	Certified units/sales
United States (RIAA)	Gold	500,000^{^}
^{^} Shipments figures based on certification alone.
