= Immortalized (Spice 1 album) =

Studio album by Spice 1
- Released: October 12, 1999
- Recorded: 1997–98
- Studio: The Cosmic Slop Shop (Fairfield, California); Battery (New York City); Infinite (Alameda, California); Sound On Sound (New York City); S&A; Unique (New York City); DaMo Muzik Works; Make Tracks (Modesto, California)
- Genre: West Coast hip hop; gangsta rap; G-funk; hyphy
- Length: 1:10:53
- Label: Jive
- Producer: Dave Mezee; Grand Exultant; Kirk Crumpler; Mo' Benjamin; Rick Rock; Tony Harmon

Spice 1 chronology
The Black Bossalini (aka Dr. Bomb from da Bay) (1997)	Immortalized (1999)	The Last Dance (2000)

Professional ratings
Review scores
Source	Rating
AllMusic	2.5/5 stars

Immortalized is the sixth studio album by American rapper Spice 1. It was released on October 12, 1999, through Jive Records. The recording sessions took place at the Cosmic Slop Shop in Fairfield, at Battery Studios, Sound on Sound and Unique Recording in New York, at Infinite Studios in Alameda, at S&A Studios, at DaMo Muzik Works, and at Make Tracks Studios in Modesto. The album was produced by Rick Rock, Kirk Crumpler, Dave Mezee, Grand Exultant, Mo' Benjamin, and Tony Harmon, with Scott Gordon and Spice 1 serving as executive producers. It features guest appearances from N.O.R.E., Den Fen, Half a Mill, Ike Dirty, Roger Troutman, Saafir, Spook Thee Man, Too Short, Young Kyoz, and Yukmouth. The album peaked at number 111 on the Billboard 200 and number 30 on the Top R&B Albums in the United States.

== Track listing ==
No.	Title	Writer(s)	Producer(s)	Length
1.	"Intro Skit"			0:33
2.	"What the Fuck" (featuring Noreaga)	Robert L. Green, Jr.; Victor Santiago; Ricardo Thomas	Rick Rock	3:20
3.	"Thug Poetry" (featuring Saafir)	Green, Jr.; Reggie Gibson; Thomas	Rick Rock	4:41
4.	"Suckas Do What They Can (Real Playaz)" (featuring Roger Troutman, Too $hort and Yukmouth)	Green, Jr.; Roger Troutman; Todd Shaw; Jerold Ellis; Thomas	Rick Rock	5:29
5.	"U Can't Fade Me Skit"			0:45
6.	"U Can't Fade Me"	Green, Jr.; O'Shea Jackson; Eric Sadler; George Clinton; William Collins	Rick Rock	4:40
7.	"Club Skit"			0:56
8.	"Can I Hit It" (featuring Danesha Simon)	Green, Jr.; Thomas	Rick Rock	5:00
9.	"High Powered"	Green, Jr.; Thomas; Algernon Franklin; Al Jackson Jr.; Booker T. Jones; Donald "Duck" Dunn; Steve Cropper	Rick Rock; Grand Exultant	4:13
10.	"Killerfornia" (featuring Cherelle Fortier)	Green, Jr.; Kirk A. Crumpler	Kirk Crumpler	5:16
11.	"News Flash Skit"			0:51
12.	"Gone with the Wind" (featuring Cherelle Fortier)	Green, Jr.; Thomas	Rick Rock	5:15
13.	"Too Deep in the Game" (featuring Spook Thee Man)	Green, Jr.; J. Poteet; David Meyer; B. Thompson	Dave Mezee; Mo Benjamin	4:41
14.	"Make Sure They Bleed"	Green, Jr.; Crumpler	Kirk Crumpler	4:00
15.	"Ride fo' Mine" (featuring Half-A-Mil and Ike Dirty)	Green, Jr.; Jasun Wardlaw; Lloyd Webster; Thomas	Rick Rock	4:41
16.	"Street Skit"			0:45
17.	"Immortalized"	Green, Jr.; Thomas	Rick Rock	4:44
18.	"Fuck the World" (featuring Young Kyoz and Den Fen)	Green, Jr.; Kevin Crockett; Dennis Thomas; Crumpler	Kirk Crumpler	3:17
19.	"Droopy Skit"			0:16
20.	"187 Proof (2 Thougin')"	Green, Jr.; Thomas	Rick Rock	3:12
21.	"Ride wit Me"	Green, Jr.; Tony Harmon; Elgin Lumpkin; Timothy Mosley; Jimmy Douglass	Tony Harmon	4:18
Total length:				1:10:53

Sample credits

- Track 6 contains a sample from Ice Cube's "You Can't Fade Me", which also contains a sample from Parliament's "Rumpofsteelskin"
- Track 9 contains a sample from "Sunny Monday" written by Booker T. & the M.G.'s
- Track 21 contains a portion of the Ginuwine's composition "Tell Me Do U Wanna"

== Charts ==
Chart (1999)	Peak position
US Billboard 200	111
US Top R&B Albums (Billboard)	30
