= Spiceberg Slim =

Studio album by Spice 1
- Released: June 11, 2002
- Recorded: 2002
- Studios: Hard Tyme (Las Vegas, NV)
- Genre: Hip-hop
- Length: 49:21
- Labels: Hard Tyme; D3
- Producers: Spice 1; Tone Toven; Wino

Spice 1 chronology
Criminal Activity (2001)	Spiceberg Slim (2002)	The Ridah (2004)

Professional ratings
Review scores
Source	Rating
AllMusic	3/5 stars
RapReviews	5/10

Spiceberg Slim is the eighth solo studio album by American rapper Spice 1. It was released on June 11, 2002, via Hard Tyme Records and D3 Entertainment. The recording sessions took place at Hard Tyme Studios in Las Vegas. It features guest appearances from Big Tray Deee, Jayo Felony, Kokane, Outlawz, Rappin' 4-Tay, and Spade. The album debuted at number 79 on the Top R&B/Hip-Hop Albums and number 39 on the Independent Albums charts in the United States.

== Track listing ==
No.	Title	Length
1.	"Spiceberg Slim"	3:38
2.	"Welcome Back to the Ghetto"	4:09
3.	"If It Ain't Rough, It Aint Me"	3:38
4.	"Its Nothin"	2:53
5.	"Thuggin" (featuring Big Tray Deee and Kokane)	3:39
6.	"You Got Me Fucked Up"	3:25
7.	"Turn da Heat Down" (featuring the Outlawz)	5:17
8.	"Haters (Come Out and Play)" (featuring Spade)	3:44
9.	"Niggas I Roll Wit"	3:44
10.	"Lucky I'm Rappin" (featuring Jayo Felony)	3:46
11.	"Azz Hole Naked"	4:07
12.	"Das OK" (featuring Rappin' 4-Tay)	3:35
13.	"Pistols, Power, Paper"	3:46
Total length:		49:21

== Charts ==
Chart (2002)	Peak position
US Top R&B/Hip-Hop Albums (Billboard)	79
US Independent Albums (Billboard)	39
