= The Last Dance (Spice 1 album) =

Studio album by Spice 1
- Released: May 16, 2000
- Recorded: 2000
- Genre: West Coast hip hop; gangsta rap
- Length: 48:36
- Label: Mobb Status; Thug World
- Producer: Al Eaton; Beezie; Blackjack; Clint "Payback" Sands; DJ Daryl; DJ Squeeky; G-Man Stan; Pimp C; Sean T

Spice 1 chronology
Immortalized (1999)	The Last Dance (2000)	Criminal Activity (2001)

The Last Dance is the seventh studio album by American rapper Spice 1. It was released on May 16, 2000, by Mobb Status Entertainment and Thug World Entertainment. The album was produced by G-Man Stan, DJ Squeeky, Al Eaton, Beezie, Blackjack, Clint "Payback" Sands, DJ Daryl, Pimp C, and Sean T. It features guest appearances from UGK, 2-Ton, Bad Azz, Black C, C-Bo, Crime Boss, MJG, Outlawz, Reefa, Sean T, and the Game Bangers. The album peaked at number 54 on the Top R&B/Hip-Hop Albums and number 28 on the Independent Albums charts in the United States.

The album marks Spice 1's first independent album since leaving Jive Records. It was well received by fans, praising Spice for returning to his raw lyricism and murderous tales, reminiscent of previous albums such as 187 He Wrote and AmeriKKKa's Nightmare.

== Track listing ==
No.	Title	Producer(s)	Length
1.	"Player Pieces"	DJ Squeeky	4:36
2.	"20/20's" (featuring Bad Azz)	Beezie	3:39
3.	"Who Can You Trust?"	G-Man Stan	3:53
4.	"Murder Mad Dance" (featuring UGK)	Al Eaton; Pimp C	4:31
5.	"Got Gunz" (featuring Outlawz)	Clint "Payback" Sands	4:57
6.	"G.A.M.E." (featuring The Game Bangers)	Blackjack	3:29
7.	"Thug Thang Y2G" (featuring Black C and Pimp C)	G-Man Stan	4:15
8.	"How We Ride" (featuring 2-Ton and Reefa)	G-Man Stan	3:54
9.	"Ghetto Soldier" (featuring Sean T and Crime Boss)	Sean T	3:43
10.	"One Luv" (featuring C-Bo)	DJ Daryl	3:32
11.	"Gunz & Money"	G-Man Stan	3:45
12.	"Chocolate Philly" (featuring MJG)	DJ Squeeky	4:22
Total length:			48:36

== Charts ==
Chart (2000)	Peak position
US Top R&B/Hip-Hop Albums (Billboard)	54
US Independent Albums (Billboard)	28
