= Jayo Felony =

American rapper

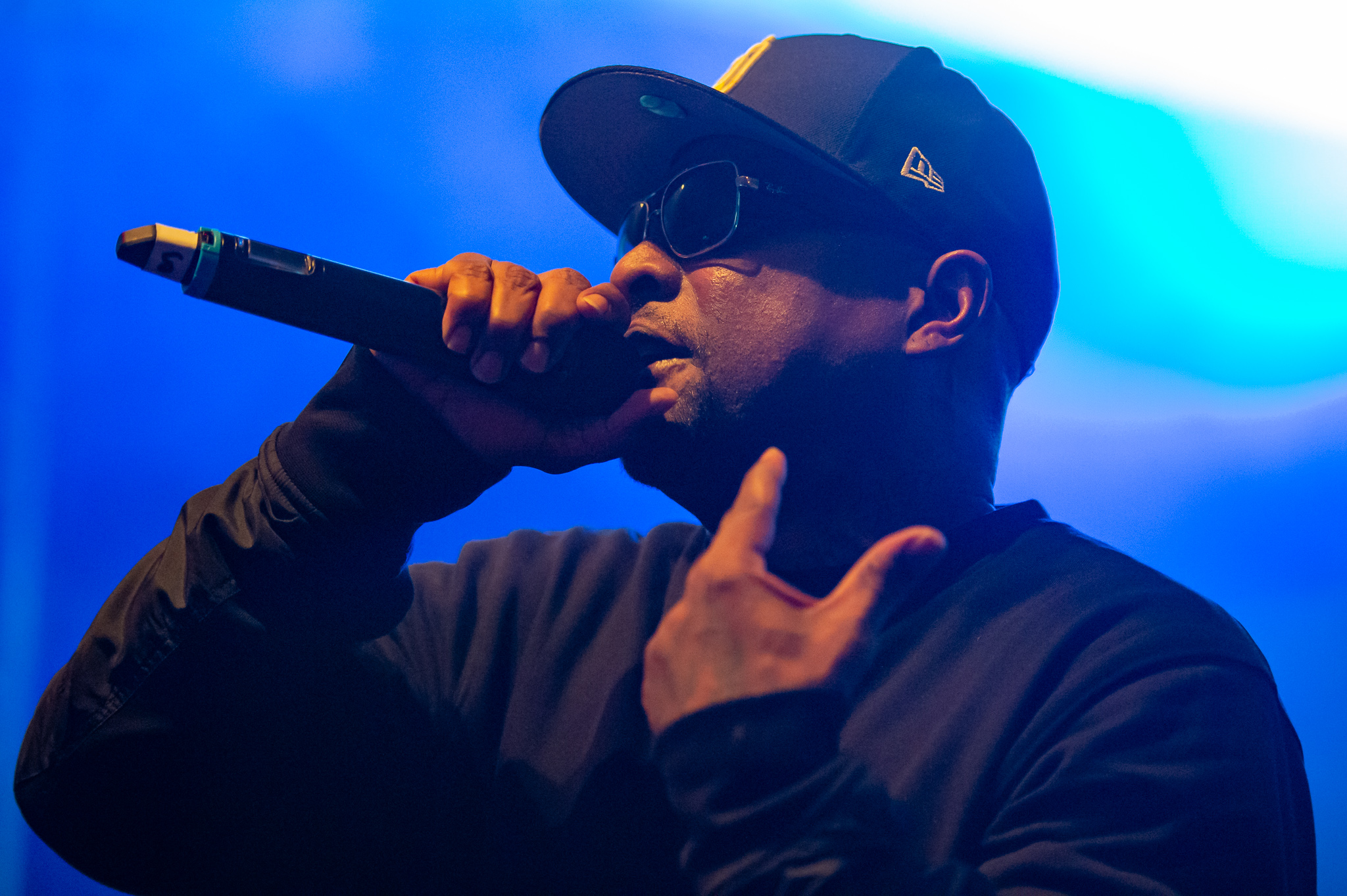
- Jayo Felony performing in 2019

Background information
- Born: B. James Savage; December 31, 1969 (age 56); Portsmouth, Virginia, U.S.
- Origin: San Diego, California, U.S.
- Genres: Hip-hop
- Occupation: Rapper
- Years active: 1990–present
- Labels: Def Jam Records; JMJ; American

B. James Savage (born December 31, 1969), better known by his stage name Jayo Felony, is an American rapper from San Diego, California.

== Career ==
In 1994, Jayo Felony signed to the label owned by Jam Master Jay from Run-DMC called Jam Master Jay Records. That year, Jayo Felony released his debut album, Take a Ride. In 1998, he released his follow-up album, Whatcha Gonna Do? on Def Jam. It featured rappers like Method Man, DMX, Mack 10, WC, Redman, Kokane, Ice Cube, E-40 and 8 Ball & MJG.

In 1999, he released Underground which features a guest appearance by San Diego rapper The Toven on the song "Du Lo Gang". There was talk of releasing a fourth album, Hotter Than Fish Grease, in 2000, but the project was not released for unknown reasons. In 2001, His fourth studio album Crip Hop was released and had multiple guest appearances. Jayo Felony's fifth studio album self-titled James Savage was released late 2019 on the Open Bar Entertainment label. That same year, he made his acting debut in the WorldStarHipHop mini series Broken Ground.

== Discography ==
=== Studio albums ===
- Take a Ride (1995)
- Whatcha Gonna Do? (1998)
- Underground (1999)
- Crip Hop (2001)
- We on on Purpose (2011)
- James Savage (2019)

=== Mixtape albums ===
- Hoodinvasion (2020)
- In the Trenches (2020)

=== Mixtapes ===
- Too the Nec Time Is Bread (2007)

=== Collaboration albums ===
- Criminal Activity with Criminalz (2001)
- Criminal Intent with Spice 1 (2007)
