= Spice 1 =

American rapper

- Also known as: Fetti Chico, Mr. Bossalini
- Born: Robert Lee Green Jr. July 2, 1970 (age 56); Bryan, Texas, U.S.
- Origin: Hayward, California, U.S.
- Genres: West Coast hip-hop; gangsta rap
- Occupations: Rapper; record producer; songwriter
- Works: Spice 1 discography
- Years active: 1988–present
- Labels: Thug World Music; High Powered; Triple X; Independent Warrior; Hard Tyme; Riviera; Mobb Status; Jive; Triad
- Member of: Criminalz
- Formerly of: Thug Lordz; The Dangerous Crew

Robert Lee Greene Jr. (born July 2, 1970), better known by his stage name Spice 1 is an American rapper from Hayward, California. He began releasing albums in 1991, where he gained popularity as a pioneer of the San Francisco Bay Area hip-hop scene.

Spice 1 released six albums under Jive Records along with one greatest hits album. Three of them, Spice 1, 187 He Wrote and AmeriKKKa's Nightmare, were certified gold.

His stage name Spice 1 is an acronym for "Sex, Pistols, Indo, Cash and Entertainment"

== Personal life ==
Greene attended Mt. Eden High School in Hayward.

When Greene received his first large check for his music, he stopped selling drugs and focused on making music instead.

On December 3, 2007, Greene was shot while sitting in his car outside his parents' home in Hayward.

== Discography ==
Studio albums

- Spice 1 (1992)
- 187 He Wrote (1993)
- AmeriKKKa's Nightmare (1994)
- 1990-Sick (1995)
- The Black Bossalini (1997)
- Immortalized (1999)
- The Last Dance (2000)
- Spiceberg Slim (2002)
- The Ridah (2004)
- Dyin' 2 Ball (2005)
- The Truth (2005)
- Haterz Nightmare (2015)
- Throne of Game (2017)
- Platinum O.G. (2019)
- This Is Thug World, Vol. 1 (2020)
- Platinum O.G. 2 (2024)

Collaborative albums

- Criminal Activity (with Celly Cel as Criminalz) (2001)
- NTA: National Thug Association (with Bad Boy) (2003)
- The Pioneers (with MC Eiht) (2004)
- Thug Lordz Trilogy (with C-Bo and Yukmouth as Thug Lordz) (2006)
- Keep It Gangsta (with MC Eiht) (2006)
- Criminal Intent (with Jayo Felony) (2007)
- Thug Therapy (with Bossolo) (2015)
