= Frost discography =

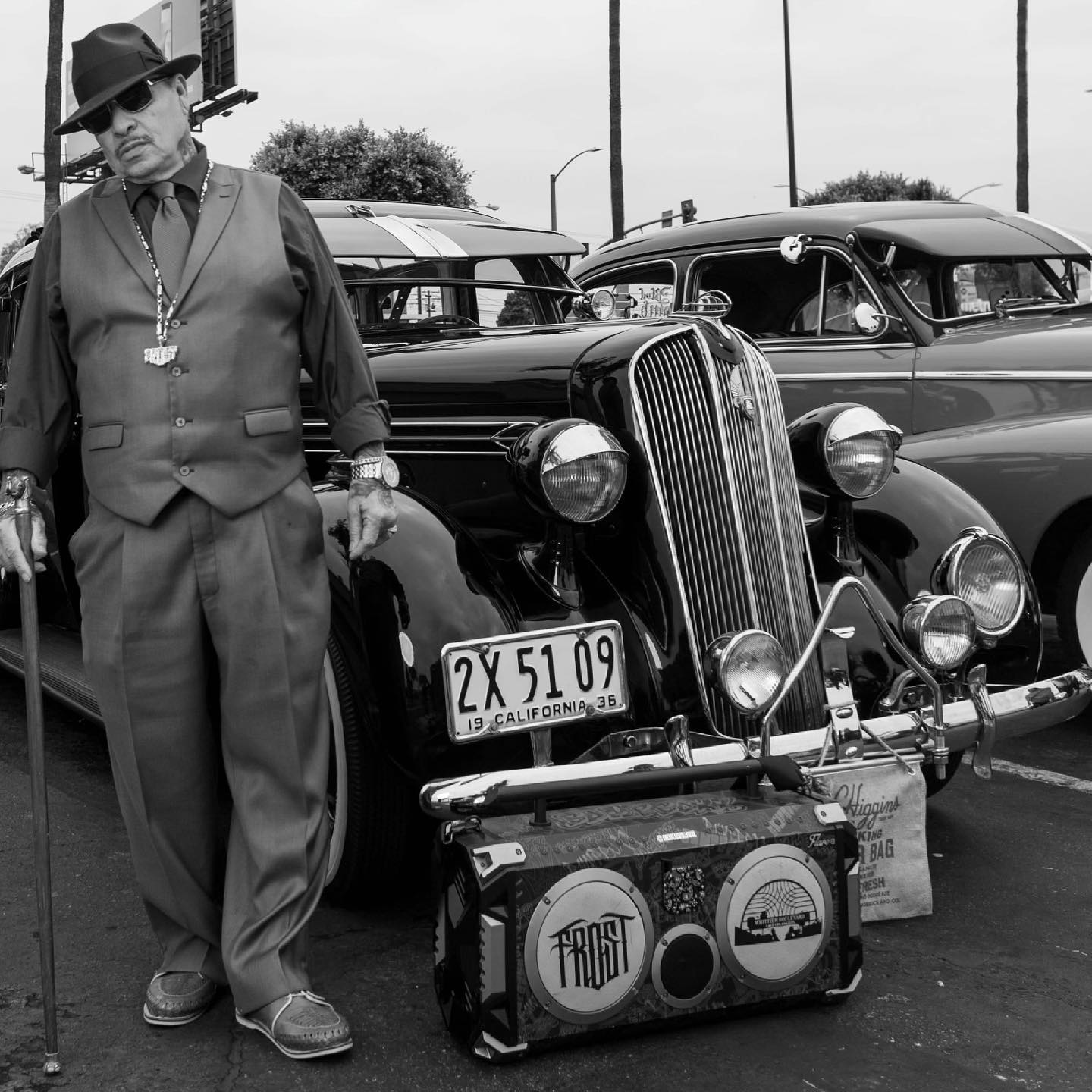
- Frost in 2008
- Studio albums: 13
- Compilation albums: 6
- Collaborative albums: 3
- Remix albums: 1

American hip hop recording artist Arturo Molina, Jr., professionally known by his stage name Frost, has released thirteen solo studio albums, three collaborative albums, being a part of Latin Alliance and Latino Velvet, six compilation albums and one remix album.

== Albums ==
=== Studio albums ===
| Title | Release | Peak chart positions | |
| Title | Release | US | US R&B |
|---|---|---|---|
| Hispanic Causing Panic | Released: July 10, 1990; Label: Virgin | 67 | 45 |
| East Side Story | Released: April 21, 1992; Label: Virgin | 73 | 54 |
| Smile Now, Die Later | Released: October 24, 1995; Label: Ruthless / Relativity | 119 | 36 |
| When Hell.A. Freezes Over | Released: July 1, 1997; Label: Ruthless / Relativity | 154 | 64 |
| That Was Then, This Is Now Vol. 1 | Released: August 31, 1999; Label: Celeb Entertainment Inc. | — | — |
| That Was Then, This Is Now Vol. 2 | Released: September 26, 2000; Label: Celeb Entertainment Inc. | — | — |
| Still Up in This Shit! | Released: April 23, 2002; Label: Hit a Lick Records / Koch | 183 | 30 |
| Welcome to Frost Angeles | Released: May 17, 2005; Label: Thump Records | — | — |
| Till the Wheels Fall Off | Released: September 26, 2006; Label: Aries Music Entertainment Inc. | — | — |
| All Oldies | Released: 2011; Label: Old West Entertainment | — | — |
| All Oldies II | Released: October 3, 2012; Label: Old West Entertainment | — | — |
| Old School Funk | Released: April 8, 2013; Label: Old West Entertainment | — | — |
| The Good Man | Released: October 29, 2013; Label: Old West Entertainment | — | — |
"—" denotes a recording that did not chart.

=== Collaboration albums ===
| Title | Release | Peak chart positions | |
| Title | Release | US | US R&B |
|---|---|---|---|
| Latin Alliance with Latin Alliance | Released: 1991; Label: Virgin | 133 | 83 |
| Latino Velvet Project with Latino Velvet | Released: September 16, 1997; Label: Swerve Records | — | — |
| Velvet City with Latino Velvet | Released: May 23, 2001; Label: Celeb Entertainment Inc. | — | — |
"—" denotes a recording that did not chart.

=== Compilation albums ===
Album Information
Frost's Greatest Joints
- Released: February 27, 2001
- Label: Thump Records
Raza Radio
- Released: May 21, 2002
- Label: 40 Ounce Records
Somethin' 4 the Riderz
- Released: March 11, 2003
- Label: 40 Ounce Records
Greatest Joints Dos
- Released: October 14, 2003
- Label: Thump Records
Blunts N Ballerz
- Released: January 30, 2007
- Label: Thump Records
Anthology
- Released: 2016
- Label: —

=== Remix albums ===
Album Information
The Best of Frost: The Remix Album
- Released: October 31, 2006
- Label: Aries Music Entertainment Inc.

== Singles ==
| Title | Year | Peak chart positions | | | | Album |
| Title | Year | US | US R&B | US Rap | AUS | Album |
|---|---|---|---|---|---|---|
| "Rough Cut" | 1984 | — | — | — | — | Non-album singles |
| "Commando Rock" (featuring C-Jam) | 1984 | — | — | — | — | Non-album singles |
| "Terminator" | 1985 | — | — | — | — | Non-album singles |
| "¡That's It! (Ya Estuvo)" | 1990 | — | — | — | — | Hispanic Causing Panic |
| "La Raza" | 1990 | 42 | — | 6 | — | Hispanic Causing Panic |
| "No Sunshine" | 1992 | 95 | — | 20 | — | East Side Story |
| "Another Firme Rola (Bad 'Cause I'm Brown)" | 1992 | — | — | — | — | East Side Story |
| "Thin Line" (featuring Boo-Yaa T.R.I.B.E.) | 1992 | — | — | 11 | — | East Side Story |
| "East Side Rendezvous" (featuring A.L.T.) | 1995 | 73 | 74 | 23 | — | Smile Now, Die Later |
| "La Familia" (featuring Rich Garcia) | 1996 | 77 | — | 39 | — | Smile Now, Die Later |
| "La Raza II" | 1996 | — | — | 45 | — | Smile Now, Die Later |
| "What's Your Name (Time of the Season)" | 1997 | — | 90 | 32 | — | When Hell.A. Freezes Over |
| "Raza Park" (featuring Don Cisco & Roger Troutman) | 1998 | — | — | — | — | Latino Velvet Project |
| "Big Business" / "Feria" | 1999 | — | — | — | — | That Was Then, This Is Now, Vol. 1 |
| "Put In Work" (featuring Daz Dillinger) | 2002 | — | — | — | — | Still Up in This Shit! |
| "Everybody Knows" | 2002 | — | — | — | — | Still Up in This Shit! |
"—" denotes a recording that did not chart.

== Guest appearances ==
| Title | Release | Other artist(s) | Album |
|---|---|---|---|
| "The Celebration" | 1992 | Boo-Yaa T.R.I.B.E., Ice Cube, Ice-T, King T | Good Times & Bad Times |
| "City of Angels" | 1996 | Above the Law | The Crow: City of Angels (soundtrack) |
| "City of Angels (Remix)" | 1996 | Above the Law | Time Will Reveal |
| "Willin' to Die" | 1996 | Litefoot, O.G.Enuis | Good Day To Die |
| "Call Me Hostile" | 1996 | Litefoot, A.L.T. | Good Day To Die |
| "Tribalistic Funk" | 1996 | Litefoot, Klev, A.L.T., O.G.Enius | Good Day To Die |
| "On a Mission" | 1996 | Litefoot, Klev, O.G.Enius | Good Day To Die |
| "Blue Sky" | 1996 | Litefoot | Good Day To Die |
| "Cali-Tex Connect" | 1998 | South Park Mexican | Power Moves: The Table |
| "West Coast, Gulf Coast, East Coast" | 1998 | South Park Mexican, Baby Bash, Low-G, Rasheed | Power Moves: The Table |
| "El Jugador" | 1998 | South Park Mexican, Low-G | Power Moves: The Table |
| "Where the G's At" | 1998 | N2Deep, Baby Bash, Don Cisco, O.G.Enius, Slow Pain, Nino Brown | The Rumble |
| "Weed Lovers Delight" | 1999 | Da'unda'dogg, Don Cisco, Angel Dust | Desolate Situations Vol. 1: Desolate |
| "Get High With Me" | 1999 | Rappin' 4-Tay | Introduction to Mackin' |
| "Presidential" | 1999 | A Lighter Shade of Brown, Jay Tee | If You Could See Inside Me |
| "Mamacita" | 2000 | Don Cisco, Soopafly, Kurupt | Oh Boy |
| "Pepe Le Pew" | 2001 | Jay Tee, South Park Mexican | So Cold |
| "Bumpin'" | 2001 | Jay Tee, Nino Brown | So Cold |
| "What We Do" | 2002 | Jay Tee, Baby Bash | High Caliber |
| "Let's Make a V" | 2002 | King T, DJ Quik, El DeBarge | The Kingdom Come |
| "In My Lo Lo" | 2004 | Don Cisco | Mecca of tha Game |
| "Thats Gangster" | 2009 | A.L.T. | The Resurrection |
| "Ain't No Luv" | 2011 | Juan Gotti, Carolyn Rodriguez, South Park Mexican | Dope La Familia |
| "Holocaust" | 2015 | Mr. Criminal, Lil Bams | Evolution of a G |
