= Urbano music =

Transnational musical category

Urbano (Música urbana)
- Other names: Latin Urban Music Hispanic urban music
- Stylistic origins: Urban contemporary; Latin music
- Cultural origins: 1980s–1990s Latin America and the United States

Subgenres
- Latin hip-hop; Latin R&B; Latin Trap; Funk carioca; Urban champeta; Reggae en Español; Reggaeton; Bachatón; Dancehall; Dembow; Guaracha; Merenrap; Corridos tumbados

Regional scenes
- Latin America; Spain; United States; Brazil

Urbano music (Spanish: música urbana [ˈmusika uɾˈβana]; Portuguese: música urbana [ˈmuzikɐ uʁˈbɐ̃nɐ]) or Latin urban is a transnational umbrella category including many different genres and styles. As an umbrella term it includes a wide and diverse set of genres and styles such as dancehall, dembow, urban champeta, funk carioca, Latin hip hop and reggaeton. The commercial breakthrough of this music took place in 2017 with artists from Colombia, Cuba, the Dominican Republic, Panama, Puerto Rico, the United States, Venezuela and even non-Spanish-speaking nations, such as Brazil, where Portuguese is spoken.

== 1990s ==
=== Origins ===
In the late 1980s and early 1990s, most Latin hip-hop came from the United States West Coast. Cuban-American artist Mellow Man Ace was the first Latino artist to have a major bilingual single attached to his 1989 debut. Mellow Man, referred to as the "Godfather of Latin rap" and a Hip Hop Hall of Fame inductee, brought mainstream attention to Spanglish rhyming with his 1989 platinum single "Mentirosa". In 1990, fellow West Coast artist Kid Frost further brought Latinos to the rap forefront with his single "La Raza". In 1991, Kid Frost, Mellow Man, A.L.T. and several other Latin rappers formed the rap supergroup Latin Alliance and released a self-titled album which featured the hit "Lowrider (On the Boulevard)". A.L.T. also scored a hit later that year with his remake of the song "Tequila". Cypress Hill, of which Mellow Man Ace was a member before going solo, would become the first Latino rap group to reach platinum status in 1991. The group has since continued to release other Gold and Platinum albums. Ecuadorian-born rapper Gerardo received heavy rotation on video and radio for his single "Rico, Suave". While commercially watered-down, his album enjoyed the status of being one of the first mainstream Spanglish CDs on the market. Johnny "J" was a multi-platinum songwriter, music producer, and rapper who was perhaps best known for his production on Tupac Shakur's albums All Eyez on Me and Me Against the World. He also produced the 1990 single "Knockin' Boots" for his classmate Candyman's album Ain't No Shame in My Game, which eventually went platinum thanks to the single.

Reggae as a musical genre has its origins in Jamaica, and it became popular throughout the 1970s in the black-immigrant communities of the other British West Indies, North America, and Great Britain. Jamaican reggae was embraced in the Spanish-speaking world first in Panama by the descendants of black workers who immigrated to the Isthmus during the construction of the Panama Railroad (mid-19th century), the railways for the banana companies (late 19th century), and the Panama Canal (early 20th century). Prior to the period of construction of the Panama Canal (1904–1915), most of the Afro-Caribbean communities in Panama were of Jamaican descent, but with the construction of the canal these communities grew in diversity with immigrants from other parts of the Caribbean such as Jamaica, Barbados, Martinique, Guadeloupe, Haiti, Trinidad, Dominica, French and British Guyana and other Caribbean Islands.

In 1977, a Guyanese immigrant who went by the nickname "Guyana", along with a local DJ known as "Wassabanga," introduced for the first time the reggae rhythms in Panama with lyrics in Spanish. Wassabanga's music, along with later interpreters such as Rastanini and Calito Soul, were perhaps the first remarkable cases of Reggae en Español, and came at a time when many Panamanians were already developing a musical and spiritual bond with the Mecca of reggae music (Kingston, Jamaica) and the music of Bob Marley.

== 2000s ==
=== Reggaeton ===
Reggaetón is an urban form of music that has its roots in Latin and Caribbean music. The genre used with rhythms from Jamaica, Spanish reggae from Panama, and rap from Puerto Rico, also popularized by Puerto Rico since the mid-1990s." Puerto Rico; most of its current artists are also from Puerto Rico. After its mainstream exposure in 2004, it spread to North American, European, Asian and African audiences. Reggaeton blends the musical influences of Jamaican dancehall with those of Latin America, such as salsa, Puerto Rico's bomba, Latin hip hop, and electronica. Vocals include rap-singing, typically in Spanish. Lyrics are derived from hip hop rather than dancehall. Reggaeton, like hip hop, has caused some controversy due to the alleged hypersexualization of women. While it takes influences from hip hop and Jamaican dancehall, reggaeton is not simply the Hispanic or Latin American version of either of these genres; reggaeton has its specific beat and rhythm, whereas Latin hip hop is simply hip hop recorded by artists of Latino descent.

In 2004, reggaeton became popular in the United States and Europe. Tego Calderón received airplay in the U.S., and the music was popular among youth. Daddy Yankee's El Cangri.com became popular that year in the country, as did Héctor & Tito. Luny Tunes and Noriega's Mas Flow, Yaga & Mackie's Sonando Diferente, Tego Calderón's El Abayarde, Ivy Queen's Diva, Zion & Lennox's Motivando a la Yal and the Desafío compilation were also well received. Rapper N.O.R.E. released a hit single, "Oye Mi Canto". Daddy Yankee released Barrio Fino and a hit single, "Gasolina". Tego Calderón recorded the singles "Pa' Que Retozen" and "Guasa Guasa". Don Omar was popular, particularly in Europe, with "Pobre Diabla" and "Dale Don Dale". Other popular reggaeton artists include Tony Dize, Angel & Khriz, Nina Sky, Dyland & Lenny, RKM & Ken-Y, Julio Voltio, Calle 13, Héctor el Father, Wisin & Yandel and Tito El Bambino. In late 2004 and early 2005, Shakira recorded "La Tortura" and "La Tortura – Shaketon Remix" for her album, Fijación Oral Vol. 1 (Oral Fixation Vol. 1), popularizing reggaeton in North America, Europe and Asia. Musicians began to incorporate bachata into reggaeton, with Ivy Queen releasing singles ("Te He Querido, Te He Llorado" and "La Mala") featuring bachata's signature guitar sound, slower, romantic rhythms, and emotive singing style. Daddy Yankee's "Lo Que Paso, Paso" and Don Omar's "Dile" are also bachata-influenced. In 2005 producers began to remix existing reggaeton music with bachata, marketing it as bachaton: "bachata, Puerto Rican style".

== 2010s ==
=== Dominican urban movement ===
Around the early and mid-2000s, a variety of urban rhythms such as Dominican hip hop and mainly Dominican Dembow were born as an artistic expression from underground and low social classes. Since 2005, a considerable amount of artists began hitting the airways and receiving mainstream exposure in the Dominican Republic. In 2006, Don Miguelo became the first urbano act to receive national airplay and widespread attention, winning best new artist at 2006 Soberano Awards while the track "Ma` Taide" hit 15 at US Tropical Airplay. In 2007 and 2008, Lapiz Conciente became the first hip hop act to receive attention by local media while Vakero introduced elements of reggae and afropop on his songs and was named a Top 5 Hot Rising Latin Urban Act by Billboard.

During the late 2000s and 2010s, a new format of merengue become very popular—Merengue de Calle, or Urban Merengue. Omega is regarded as one of the most popular acts and was the recipient of Best Merengue Urban act in the 2009 and 2010 Soberano Awards. His studio albums El Dueño del Flow (2009) and El Dueño del Flow (2011) charted on the US Top Latin Albums and Tropical Albums. He collaborated with other Latin American artists, including Daddy Yankee, Ozuna, Shakira, Akon, and Pitbull.

In 2011, Vakero became the first recipient of Best Urbano Artist at the Soberano Awards. In 2014, Don Miguelo released "Como Yo Le Doy" with Pitbull, which peaked at number one on US Tropical Songs and 16 on Hot Latin Songs. It was nominated at Premios Juventud 2015 and was certified platinum by the RIAA for selling over 60,000 units in the United States, becoming the first urban act to do so. In 2015, Mozart La Para hit the top 20 at US Tropical Airplay and Latin Rhythm charts with the track "Llegan los Montro Men" and later signed a recording contract worth $2 million to Roc Nation. In 2016, Lapiz Conciente's studio album Latidos debuted at number 7 on the US Billboard Latin Albums; the following year, his song "Papa" with veteran rapper Vico C was nominated for Best Urbano Song at the 18th Annual Latin Grammy Awards.

=== Colombia's reglobalization ===
Colombian artists like Maluma or J Balvin put out hits every two or three months, and the South American country pays tribute to this genre in all its cities. Medellin concentrates on the most successful artists and producers, meanwhile Bogota has specialized in theme parties around this rhythm. One of the key components to the success of the genre is its use to unite social gaps in Colombian society, the genre is widely seen in the smaller neighborhoods of southern Bogota along with the most exclusive clubs in Zona T or the Parque de la 93.

Karol G is a Colombian reggaetón singer who has done collaborations with other reggaetón singers, such as J Balvin, Bad Bunny, and Maluma. Throughout her career, Karol G has had troubles in the industry because reggaetón is a genre that male artists dominate. She recounts how when starting her career, she noticed that there were not many opportunities for her in the genre because male artists dominated reggaetón. In 2018, Karol G's single "Mi Cama" became very popular, and she made a remix with J Balvin and Nicky Jam. The "Mi Cama" remix appeared in the top 10 Hot Latin Songs and number 1 in Latin Airplay charts. This year she has collaborated with Maluma called Creeme and with Anuel AA in "Culpables". The single "Culpables" has been in the top 10 Hot Latin Songs for 2 consecutive weeks.

=== Funk carioca ===
Funk carioca was a direct derivative of samba, Afrobeat, Miami bass, Latin music, traditional African religious music, Candomble, hip hop and freestyle (another Miami-based genre) music from the US. These genres, very localized in the US, became popular and influential in Rio de Janeiro due to proximity. Miami was a popular plane stop for Rio DJs to buy the latest American records. Along with the Miami influence came the longtime impact of the slave trade in Colonial Brazil. Various African religions like vodun, and candomble were brought with the enslaved Africans to the Americas. The same beat is found in Afro-Religious music in the African diaspora; many black Brazilians identify as part of this religion. This genre of music was mainly started by those in black communities in Brazil, therefore a boiling pot of influences to derive the trademark.

=== Latin trap ===
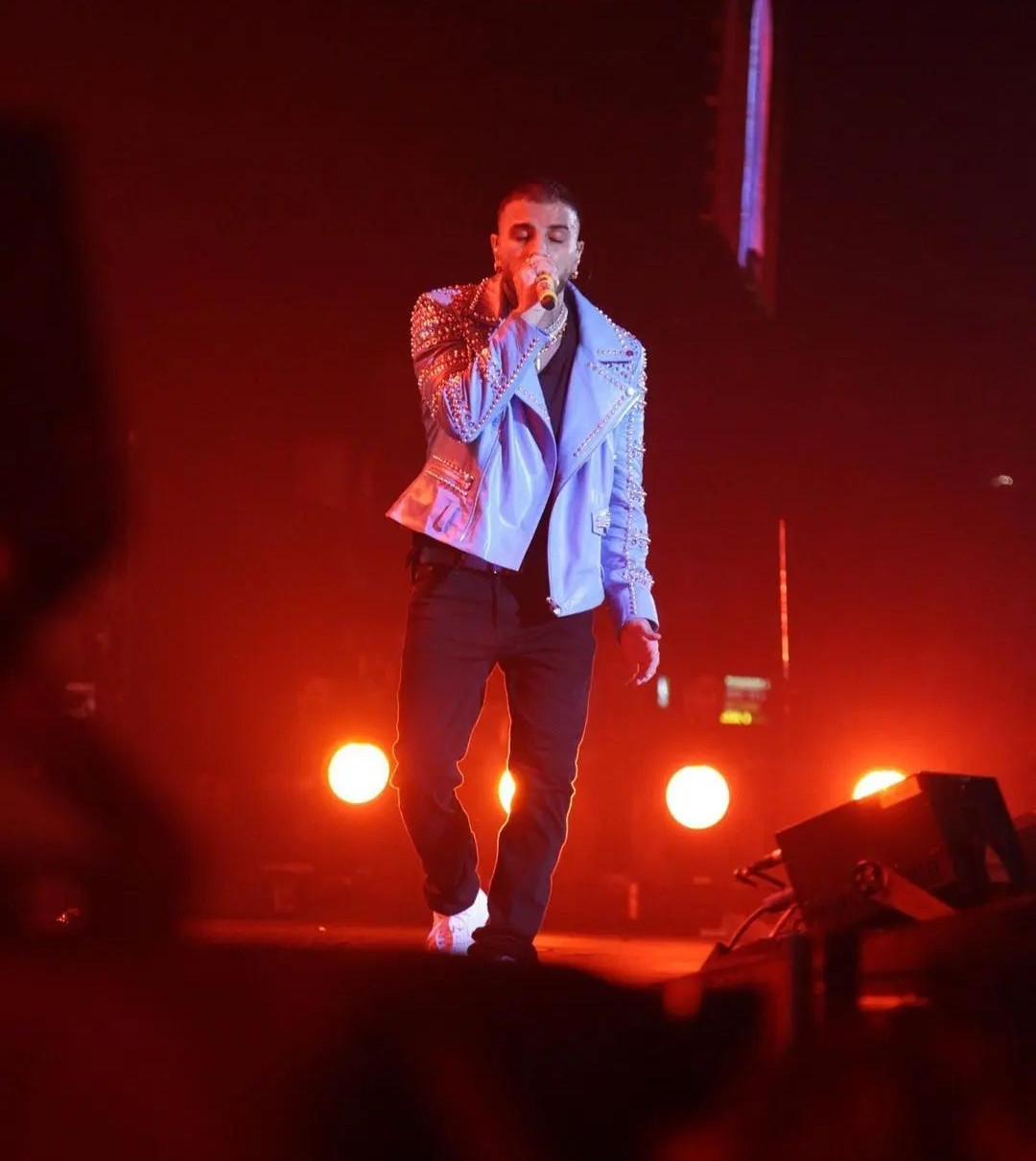
Rauw Alejandro Vice Versa Tour

Latin trap is a subgenre of trap music that originated in Puerto Rico. A direct descendant of southern hip hop, and influenced by reggaeton, it gained popularity after 2007 and has since spread throughout Latin America. The trap is slang for a place where drugs are sold. Latin trap is similar to mainstream trap with lyrics about life on la calle (the streets), which deal with love, sex, drugs, and violence, often without censorship.

Puerto Rican reggaeton and Latin trap singer Ozuna states that it originated in 2007 with the song "El Pistolón", performed by Arcángel & De La Ghetto, Yaga & Mackie, and Jowell & Randy (the former two were duo at the time). In an August 2017 article for Billboard's series, "A Brief History Of", they enlisted some of the key artists of Latin trap, including Ozuna, De La Ghetto, Bad Bunny, Farruko and Messiah to narrate a brief history on the genre. In 2018, Cardi B's hit single "I Like It" featuring Bad Bunny and J Balvin became the first Latin trap song to reach number one on the US Billboard Hot 100 chart.

=== The 'Despacito' effect and mainstream resurgence of reggaeton ===
In 2017, the music video for "Despacito" by Luis Fonsi featuring Daddy Yankee reached over a billion views in under 3 months. As of December 2020, the music video is the all-time's second most-viewed YouTube video. With its 3.3 million certified sales plus track-equivalent streams, "Despacito" became one of the best-selling Latin singles in the United States.

The song's success and its remix version led Daddy Yankee to become the most listened-to artist worldwide on the streaming service Spotify on July 9, 2017, being the first Latin artist to do so. He later became the fifth most listened-to male artist and the sixth overall of 2017 on Spotify. In June 2017, "Despacito" was cited by Billboard's Leila Cobo as the song that renewed interest in the Latin music market from recording labels in the United States. Julyssa Lopez of The Washington Post stated that the successes of "Despacito" and J Balvin's "Mi Gente" is "the beginning of a new Latin crossover era." Stephanie Ho of Genius website wrote that "the successes of 'Despacito' and 'Mi Gente' could point to the beginning of a successful wave for Spanish-language music in the US." Ho also stated that "as 'Despacito' proves, fans don't need to understand the language to enjoy the music", referring to the worldwide success of the song.

=== 'Te Bote' spawning imitators ===
In April 2018, Te Boté, released by Nio Garcia, Casper Magico, Darell, Ozuna, Bad Bunny, and Nicky Jam. It became the first dancehall song to have reached number one on the Billboard Hot Latin Songs chart. It currently has over 1.8 billion viewers in YouTube. But Te Boté not only achieved that. Many artists began to mark strong commercial trends in a market dominated by mixing Reggaeton and Latin trap. For example, "Adictiva" by Daddy Yankee and Anuel AA, "Asesina" by Brytiago and Darell, "Cuando Te Besé" by Becky G and Paulo Londra, "No Te Veo" by Casper Magico, have influenced the style.

== 2020s ==
=== Argentina's urbano movement ===
At the beginning of 2020, a new generation brought more Argentine identity to urbano. The songs "Colocao" by Nicki Nicole, and "Mamichula" by Trueno and Nicole were the first urbano songs on the list of number-one singles of 2020 in Spain; they also reached the Argentina Hot 100.

RKT—also known as Cachengue, cumbiatón, onda turra or cumbia turra—is a form of Argentine cumbia that is heavily influenced by cumbia villera and reggaeton. The genre emerged in San Martín, Buenos Aires during the 2000s and became popular in Argentina during the 2010s with artists such Los Wachiturros and Nene Malo. The genre has spread to other countries, including Bolivia, Chile and Uruguay. DJ Fer Palacio has made a name for himself by remixing reggaeton songs with elements of cachengue.

== See also ==
- Billboard Latin rhythm charts
- Grammy Award for Best Música Urbana Album
- Latin Grammy Award for Best Urban Music Album
- Latin Grammy Award for Best Urban Song
- List of Urbano artists
- Objetivo Fama
