= Oh Boy (Don Cisco album) =

Studio album by Don Cisco
- Released: August 29, 2000
- Genres: West Coast hip hop, Gangsta rap, Rap, Chicano rap
- Length: 73:49
- Label: Thump Street
- Producers: Bigg Robb, Fingazz, Fredwreck, Mall, Philly Blunt, Tone Capone

Don Cisco chronology
Til the Wheels Fall Off (1998)	Oh Boy (2000)	Hustler's Paradise (2005)

Oh Boy is the second studio album by American rapper Don Cisco, released August 29, 2000 on Thump Street. It was produced by Bigg Robb, Fingazz, Fredwreck, Mall, Philly Blunt and Tone Capone. The album features guest performances by fellow Latino Velvet members: Jay Tee, Baby Beesh and Frost, as well as Mac Dre, Kurupt, Soopafly, Roscoe, Roger Troutman, B-Legit and PSD.

The song, "Mamacita", was originally heard in the film Next Friday and was also released on the film's soundtrack. "Breezy" later appeared on the Latino Velvet compilation, Menudo Mix and "Pimps Get Chose" was later re-titled and re-released on the Mac Dre compilation, Appearances.

== Critical reception ==
Professional ratings
Review scores
Source	Rating
Allmusic	3/5 stars

Allmusic - "...Balancing a smooth flow with charismatic lyrics, the Latin rapper moves through a stunning number of tracks without exhausting thematic material...this album features an artist capable of going head to head with most major label MCs, along with slick, funk-influenced production. Furthermore, the straight-up Latin moments, such as the chorus to "Mamacita"—featuring the superstar line-up of Cisco, Frost, Soopafly, and Kurupt—bring a new aesthetic to hip-hop."

== Track listing ==
1. "Born Ready" - 1:06
2. "Oh Boy" (featuring Kurupt & Roscoe) - 4:36
3. "Keep It to Myself" - 4:11
4. "Long Range Pimpin" (Prelude) - 0:36
5. "Long Range Pimpin" - 3:56
6. "Pimps Get Chose" (featuring Mac Dre) - 3:53
7. "Guajira" (featuring Bigg Robb & Roger Troutman) - 4:00
8. "Just Like Mexico" (Prelude) - 0:06
9. "Just Like Mexico" - 2:48
10. "Mamacita" (Prelude) - 0:15
11. "Mamacita" (featuring Frost, Soopafly & Kurupt) - 4:46
12. "Murder After Dark" (Prelude) - 0:11
13. "Murder After Dark" (featuring B-Legit) - 4:28
14. "Boss Up" (featuring Dubee) - 4:23
15. "Brainstorm" (Interlude) - 0:59
16. "Talk That Talk" (featuring PSD) - 4:14
17. "My Response" (Prelude) - 1:02
18. "My Response" (featuring Miami) - 5:41
19. "Do You Like 2 Ride?" - 5:30
20. "Raza Park" (Interlude) - 0:36
21. "Weekendz Freakendz" - 3:19
22. "Breezy" (featuring Baby Beesh & Jay Tee) - 4:21
23. "Watcha Wanna Do?" - 4:18
24. "Oh Boy" (Radio edit) (featuring Kurupt & Roscoe) - 4:33
