= Mo' Ritmo =

Studio album by Gerardo
- Released: January 29, 1991
- Recorded: 1990
- Studio: Bossa Nova Hotel, Cafe Al Dente, Cliffhanger
- Genre: Latin rap
- Length: 49:02
- Label: Interscope
- Producer: Christian Warren; Hilary Bercovici; Dr. Freeze; Michael Sembello

Gerardo chronology
Mo' Ritmo (1991)	Dos (1992)

Singles from Mo' Ritmo
- 1. "Rico Suave" Released: December 1990; 2. "We Want the Funk" Released: 1991; 3. "When the Lights Go Out" Released: 1991

Mo' Ritmo is the first album by the Ecuadorian-born American Gerardo. Released in 1991 by Interscope Records as the label's inaugural album, it peaked at No. 36 on the Billboard 200.

== Production ==
The album was partially produced by Michael Sembello, who had worked on the "Rico Suave" single.

== Critical reception ==
Professional ratings
Review scores
Source	Rating
AllMusic	3/5 stars
Robert Christgau	(1-star Honorable Mention)
The Encyclopedia of Popular Music	4/5 stars
MusicHound R&B: The Essential Album Guide	1.5/5 stars
The Rolling Stone Album Guide	2/5 stars

Entertainment Weekly wrote that Gerardo's "heavy use of Latin rhythms and melodies may give the music a twist, but Spanglish rap is delivered with more finesse by Mellow Man Ace and Kid Frost." Rolling Stone deemed Mo' Ritmo "a Latin-tinged debut album of bilingual just-a-gigolo raps." The Baltimore Sun wrote that "instead of simply sampling some Santana, Gerardo builds his beat around conga and timbale for a hard-core Latin hip-hop groove that makes 'Brother to Brother' and 'Rico Suave' kick like nothing else in rap."

== Track listing ==
1. "When the Lights Go Out" (Gerardo Mejía, Dan Sembello, Michael Sembello) – 4:05
2. "Brother to Brother" (Mejía, Alfred Rubalcava) – 3:33
3. "Rico Suave" (Mejia, Christian Warren, Alberto Slezynger, Rosa Soy, Charles Bobbit) – 4:51
4. "En Mi Barrio" (Mejia, M. Sembello) – 2:58
5. "Latin Till I Die (Oye Como Va)" (cover; Mejia, Tito Puente) – 4:01
6. "We Want the Funk" (cover; written by Mejia, George Clinton, Bootsy Collins and Jerome Brailey) – 4:12
7. "Christina" (Mejia, Warren) – 3:56
8. "Fandango" (Mejia, Rubalcava) – 5:30
9. "You Gotta Hold of My Soul" (Mejia, M. Sembello) – 4:58
10. "The Groove Remains the Same (Mo' Ritmo)" (Mejia, M. Sembello, Brian O'Doherty) – 5:13

== Credits ==
- Lead vocals: Gerardo
- Additional vocals: Coco, Ellis Hall, Nikki Harris, Anna Marie, Gerardo, Xavier Menia, Brian O’Daughtery, Alfred Rubalcava, Cruz Baca Sembello, and Michael Sembello
- Programmers: Jimmy Abney, Hilary Bercovici, Brian O’Daughtery, Alfred Rubalcava, Danny Sembello, Michael Sembello, and Christian Warren
- Engineer: Hilary Bercovici, David Bianco, Bobby Brooks, Bud Rizzo, and Michael Smith
- Assistant engineer: Tim Anderson
- Mixers: Hilary Bercovici, David Bianco, Bobby Brooks, and Erik Zobler
- Scratcher: D-Roc
- Remixers: Dr. Freeze and Angela Piva
- Timbales: Ronnie Gutierrez and Michael Sembello
- Bongos: Alfred Ortiz
- Congas: Alfred Ortiz
- Photography: Barry King and Randee St. Nicholas

== Charts ==
=== Weekly charts ===
Chart (1991)	Peak position
US Billboard 200	36
US Top R&B/Hip-Hop Albums (Billboard)	64

=== Year-end charts ===
Chart (1991)	Position
US Billboard 200	96

== Certifications ==
Region	Certification	Certified units/sales
United States (RIAA)	Gold	500,000^{^}
^{^} Shipments figures based on certification alone.
