= Somethin' 4 the Riderz =

Compilation album by Frost
- Released: March 11, 2003
- Recorded: 1990–2002
- Genre: Latin rap, gangsta rap
- Label: 40 Ounce Records
- Producer: Tony G. Frost; Julio G

Frost chronology
Still Up In This Shit! (2002)	Somethin' 4 the Riderz (2003)	Welcome to Frost Angeles (2005)

Somethin' 4 the Riderz is a compilation album by American rapper Frost. The album was released in 2003 via 40 Ounce Records. It contained unreleased and hard-to-find songs by Frost. The album featured many guests including Ice-T, Above the Law, King Tee and DJ Quik.

== Track listing ==
1. "Cali Tex Connection" feat. SPM
2. "How We Ride" feat. Mr. Gee & K-Borne
3. "Connection" feat. Mr. Coop
4. "Chicano Gambinos" feat. Mr. Gee & G' Fellas
5. "Maria" feat. Jay Tee & Baby Beesh
6. "Same Shit" feat. Jay Tee & Baby Beesh
7. "Presidential" feat. LSOB & Jay Tee
8. "City of Angels" feat. Above the Law
9. "What's Goin' On?" feat. Jay Tee & Baby Beesh
10. "It Ain't Easy" feat. Gambino All Stars
11. "We Ride Hot" feat. Jay Tee & Messy Marv
12. "Got Bud" feat. Nino B & Don Cisco
13. "Mamacita" feat Don Cisco, Kurupt & Soopafly
14. "Last Nite" feat. Jay Tee
15. "West Coast, Gulf Coast, East Coast" feat. SPM & Baby Beesh
16. "Get High with Me" feat. Rappin' 4-Tay & Shorty B
17. "Let's Make A V" feat. King Tee, DJ Quik & James DeBarge
18. "What You Wanna Do" feat. Merciless & Javi Picasso
19. "Party Goin' Down Tonight" feat. Jay Tee
20. "Tears of a Mother" feat. Ice-T
