= No Sunshine =

No Sunshine may refer to:

- "No Sunshine" (DMX song)
- "No Sunshine" (Frost song)
- "No Sunshine", a song by Therapy? from their 2018 album Cleave

== See also ==
- "Ain't No Sunshine", a 1971 song by Bill Withers
