= Held Up (soundtrack) =

Soundtrack album by Various artists
- Released: March 14, 2000
- Recorded: 1999–2000
- Genre: Hip hop; gangsta rap; R&B
- Length: 1:13:10
- Label: Spot Music Group, Inc.
- Producer: Brandon C. Rodegeb (exec.); Daric Bergerson (exec.); Joel C. High (exec.); Mark Viducich (exec.); Rob Nonies (exec.); Tony Smith (exec.); G-Man Stan; A. Bryant; Black Toben; Brian "Wino" Dobbs; Crimelab Productions; Da Network; Daz Dillinger; Derek "D.O.A." Allen; D.J. Iroc; DJ Laz; DK All Day; Fredwreck; K.B.; Mike Smooth; Mr. Nitro; Sean T; The Boom Brothers; Polarbear

Singles from Held Up
- 1. "Done Deal" Released: 1999; 2. "Save the Drama" Released: 2000; 3. "All Night Long" Released: 2000

Professional ratings
Review scores
Source	Rating
AllMusic	3/5 stars

Held Up: Original Motion Picture Soundtrack is the soundtrack to Steve Rash's 2000 film Held Up. It was released on March 14 the same year through Spot Music Group, Inc. and consisted of hip hop and R&B music.

== Track listing ==
No.	Title	Producer(s)	Length
1.	"Held Up" (performed by Layzie Bone, Mo' Thugs & K.B.)	Mike Smooth	4:09
2.	"Save the Drama" (performed by Sean T, JT the Bigga Figga & San Quinn)	Sean T	4:07
3.	"N' Dis World" (performed by Young Bleed)	G-Man Stan	3:12
4.	"Ride Baby" (performed by Rome)	A. Bryant	4:40
5.	"I'm That Other Man" (performed by K.B.)	Mr. Nitro; KB	4:32
6.	"Who's Knoccin' at My Door" (performed by Daz Dillinger & Big Pimpin' Delemond)	Daz Dillinger	4:29
7.	"Westside Interlude"		0:27
8.	"'Round There" (performed by Boo-Yaa T.R.I.B.E. & Mike Pro)	Derek "D.O.A." Allen	5:07
9.	"All Night Long" (performed by Steelo & Slow Pain)	Fredwreck	3:47
10.	"Mike Tyson Interlude"		0:16
11.	"Dyin' Over Nuttin'" (performed by Baby Bash & South Park Mexican)	Da Network	3:56
12.	"Come On" (performed by Kam)	Brian "Wino" Dobbs	3:48
13.	"Live About It" (performed by Himalayaz, Kurupt & Roscoe)	DK All Day	4:33
14.	"Murderest MC's" (performed by Bad Azz)	Black Toben	4:15
15.	"Holla" (performed by 2-Ton, Celly Cel & Rappin' 4-Tay)	G-Man Stan	4:16
16.	"Reason Interlude"		1:12
17.	"You're All I Need" (performed by Amar Khalil)	D.J. Iroc	3:14
18.	"The Walk" (performed by Coolio, Rated R & Young Will)	Crimelab Productions	3:48
19.	"La Bamba" (performed by Jonny Z & DJ Laz)	DJ Laz	3:56
20.	"Whoop Ass Interlude"		0:35
21.	"Love Whoopin'" (performed by The Boom Brothers)	The Boom Brothers	4:51
22.	"Done Deal" (performed by Helluva)	Polarbear	6:34
Total length:			1:13:10
