= East Side Rendezvous =

1995 single by Frost featuring A.L.T., O.G.Enius and Diane Gordon

Single by Frost featuring A.L.T., O.G.Enius and Diane Gordon

from the album Smile Now, Die Later
- Released: 1995
- Length: 4:33
- Label: Ruthless; Relativity
- Songwriters: Arturo Molina Jr.; Alvin Trivette; O.G.Enius
- Producer: Monte Carlo

Frost singles chronology
"Thin Line" (1992)	"East Side Rendezvous" (1995)	"La Familia" (1996)

A.L.T. singles chronology
"Tequila" (1992)	"East Side Rendezvous" (1995)

Music video
- "East Side Rendezvous" on YouTube

"East Side Rendezvous" is a song by American rapper Frost. It is the lead single from his third studio album, Smile Now, Die Later (1995) and features rappers A.L.T. and O.G.Enius and singer Diane Gordon. It was produced by Monte Carlo and peaked at numbers 62 and 73 on the US Cash Box Top 100 and Billboard Hot 100 charts.

== Composition ==
"East Side Rendezvous" is a smooth, upbeat song. It contains soul singing-inspired vocals from Diane Gordon.

== Charts ==
Chart (1995)	Peak position
US Billboard Hot 100	73
US Hot R&B/Hip-Hop Songs (Billboard)	74
US Hot Rap Songs (Billboard)	23
US Rhythmic Airplay (Billboard)	31
US Cash Box Top 100	62
