= When Hell.A. Freezes Over =

Studio album by Frost
- Released: July 1, 1997
- Recorded: 1996–1997
- Genre: Latin hip hop; gangsta rap
- Length: 1:04:25
- Label: Ruthless; Relativity
- Producer: Frost; Baby Beesh; Julio G; Fredwreck; DJ Ace; Jeeve; Block

Frost chronology
Smile Now, Die Later (1995)	When Hell.A. Freezes Over (1997)	That Was Then, This Is Now, Vol. 1 (1999)

Singles from When Hell.A. Freezes Over
- 1. "What's Your Name (Time of the Season)" Released: 1997

When Hell.A. Freezes Over is the fourth studio album by American rapper Frost. It was released on July 1, 1997, through Ruthless/Relativity Records. The album features guest appearances from Domino, Slow Pain, O.G.Enius, Ice-T, and Frost's son Scoop DeVille.

The album peaked at #154 on the Billboard 200 and #64 on the Top R&B/Hip-Hop Albums chart. Its only single, "What's Your Name (Time of the Season)", also made it to #90 on the Hot R&B/Hip-Hop Songs chart and #32 on the Hot Rap Songs chart.

== Track listing ==
No.	Title	Producer(s)	Length
1.	"Mexican Border"	Frost; Jeeve	4:05
2.	"Tombstone"	Julio G	4:33
3.	"Loco" (featuring Ice-T)	DJ Ace	4:19
4.	"Heaven and Hell"	Frost	4:19
5.	"Rock On" (featuring O.G.Enius, Scoop DeVille & Diane Gordon)	Fredwreck	4:31
6.	"Heaven Sent"	Fredwreck	4:42
7.	"G-Spot Interlude"	The G-Spot	1:06
8.	"Anotha Day Anotha Dolla"	Frost; Baby Beesh	6:00
9.	"Nothing in This World"	Julio G	4:36
10.	"Chema Otro Leno Mas"	Frost; Block	2:47
11.	"Reunited (Lo Riding)" (featuring Domino & O.G.Enius)	Frost; Baby Beesh	4:53
12.	"From My Block to Your Block" (featuring Slow Pain)	Frost; Baby Beesh	4:25
13.	"Get Down (Make It Hot Big Daddy, Make It Hot)"	Frost; Baby Beesh	4:34
14.	"You're a Big Girl Now"	Frost	5:07
15.	"What's Your Name (Time of the Season)"	Julio G	4:28
Total length:			1:04:25

== Chart history ==
Chart (1997)	Peak position
US Billboard 200	154
US Top R&B/Hip-Hop Albums (Billboard)	64
