= Latin Alliance (album) =

Studio album by Latin Alliance
- Released: August 6, 1991
- Recorded: 1990–1991
- Studios: Digital Sound & Picture (New York City, New York); Wide Tracks (Hollywood, California); Image Recorders (Hollywood, California); Skyline Recording (Topanga, California); Echo Sound (Los Angeles, California)
- Genres: Latin hip hop, Chicano rap
- Length: 43:15
- Label: Virgin
- Producers: Frost; Tony G; Will Roc; Ralph Rivers; Todd Alexander; the Baka Boyz; Geoff Rios; Julio G; Mike Greene

Kid Frost chronology
Hispanic Causing Panic (1990)	Latin Alliance (1991)	East Side Story (1992)

A.L.T. chronology
Latin Alliance (1991)	Another Latin Timebomb (1992)

Singles from Latin Alliance
- 1. "Lowrider (On the Boulevard)" Released: 1991; 2. "Know What I'm Saying" Released: 1991

Latin Alliance is the studio album by a one-off collaboration of Chicano and Latin American rappers. The group was formed in 1989 and released their one and only album in 1991 via Virgin Records. It features performances by Kid Frost, A.L.T., Markski, Rayski Rockswell, Mellow Man Ace, Lyrical Engineer, Hip Hop Astronaut, and the Lyrical Latin, with guest appearances by War and Scoop DeVille. The recording sessions took place at Digital Sound & Picture in New York City, Skyline Recording in Topanga, Wide Tracks, Image Recorders, and Echo Sound in Los Angeles. The album was produced by Kid Frost, Tony G, Will Roc, Todd Alexander, Ralph Rivers, the Baka Boyz, Julio G, Geoff Rios, and Mike Greene.

The ten-track album peaked at No. 133 on the Billboard 200, at 83 on the Top R&B/Hip-Hop Albums chart and at 18 on the Heatseekers Albums chart. It spawned two singles: "Lowrider (On the Boulevard)", a remake of War's hit single "Low Rider", and "Know What I'm Sayin'?". Its lead single, "Lowrider (On the Boulevard)", which was performed by Frost, A.L.T., Markski, Mellow Man Ace, and War, made it to number 15 on the Hot Rap Songs chart. Latin Alliance is regarded as one of the pioneering albums of Hispanic hip hop, being one of the first albums to be released by a group of Latino rappers.

== Critical reception ==
Professional ratings
Review scores
Source	Rating
AllMusic	4.5/5 stars

The St. Petersburg Times stated: "Using samples from such diverse sources as War, Herbie Hancock, the Dramatics and Bob James, the group constructs rhythm tracks rooted in funk and laced with Afro-Cuban touches (timbales, horns and the like)." Trouser Press said that the album "includes appealing rhymes about identity, undocumented aliens, community unity and social dangers."

== Track listing ==
No.	Title	Producer(s)	Length
1.	"Low Rider (On the Boulevard)" (performed by Kid Frost, A.L.T., Mellow Man Ace, Markski & War)	Frost; Tony G.; Will Roc	4:46
2.	"What Is an American?" (performed by A.L.T.)	Frost; Tony G.	4:00
3.	"Runnin'" (performed by Kid Frost & A.L.T.)	Frost; Will Roc	3:59
4.	"Know What I'm Sayin'?" (performed by Rayski Rockswell)	Frost; Will Roc	4:22
5.	"What You See Is What You Get" (performed by Kid Frost)	Ralph Rivers; Todd Alexander; Frost (add.); Tony G. (add.)	4:40
6.	"Latinos Unidos" (special appearance by Scoop DeVille)	Geoff Rios; Julio G.; Frost; Ralph Rivers; Todd Alexander; Mike Greene; Tony G.; Will Roc	5:07
7.	"Can U Feel It" (performed by Markski)	Tony G.	3:34
8.	"Smooth Roughness" (performed by Lyrical Engineer)	Ralph Rivers; Todd Alexander; the Baker Boyz (add.)	4:05
9.	"Valla en Paz" (performed by Hip Hop Astronaut)	The Baker Boyz; Tony G.	3:49
10.	"No Man's Land" (performed by The Lyrical Latin)	The Baker Boyz	4:53
Total length:			43:15

Sample credits

- "Lowrider (On the Boulevard)" sampled "Lowrider" by War and "Evil Ways" by Santana
- "What Is an American" sampled "Heartbeat" by War and "On Your Face" by Earth, Wind & Fire
- "Know What I'm Sayin'?" sampled "Nautilus" by Bob James and "Life Is Just a Moment" by Roy Ayers
- "What You See Is What You Get" sampled "What You See Is What You Get" by the Dramatics
- "Latinos Unidos (United Latins)" sampled "Funky Nassau" by ATC, "Mr. Groove" by One Way Band, "Cut the Lake" by Average White Band and "Just Let It Play" by Gonzales
- "Can U Feel It" sampled "I.O.U." by Freeez
- "Smooth Roughness" sampled "Hang Up Your Hang-Ups" by Herbie Hancock

== Personnel ==
- Arturo Molina Jr. – vocals, producer (tracks: 1–4, 6), additional producer (track 5)
- Alvin Trivette – vocals
- Mark Santiago – vocals
- Ray Ramos – vocals
- Ulpiano Sergio Reyes – vocals
- George Anthony Perez – vocals
- Elijah Blue Molina – vocals
- Hip Hop Astronaut – vocals
- The Lyrical Latin – vocals
- War – vocals
- Ronnie King – keyboards (tracks: 5, 8)
- Vincent La Bauve – guitar (tracks: 5, 10)
- Darrell "Bob Dog" Robertson – guitar (track 4)
- D.J. Milner – bass (track 10)
- Mitch Rafel – saxophone (track 5), flute (track 10)
- Tommy D. – harmonica (track 2)
- "Professor" Dwight Baldwin – percussion (tracks: 2, 5, 6, 8, 10)
- Antonio Gonzalez – percussion (tracks: 4, 6, 10), producer (tracks: 1, 2, 6, 7, 9), additional producer (track 5), mixing (tracks: 6, 9), arranging (track 10)
- Todd Alexander – percussion (tracks: 5, 8), producer (tracks: 5, 6, 8)
- Ralph Medrano – scratches (tracks: 1, 3–6)
- Nick Vidal – scratches (tracks: 6, 8–10), producer (tracks: 9, 10), additional producer (track 8), mixing (track 9)
- Julio Gonzalez – scratches (track 9), producer (track 6)
- Kevin Gilliam – scratches (track 4)
- William L. Griffin – producer (tracks: 1, 3, 4, 6), mixing (track 6)
- Ralph Rivers – producer (tracks: 5, 6, 8)
- Eric Vidal – producer (tracks: 9, 10), additional producer (track 8)
- Geoff Rios – producer (track 6)
- Mike Greene – producer (track 6)
- Jason Roberts – mixing (track 1), engineering
- John Cevetello – mixing (track 6), engineering
- Bob Drake – engineering, mixing
- Josh Schneider – engineering, mixing
- Stephen Marcussen – mastering
- Steve J. Gerdes – art direction
- Tom Dolan – design
- Jackie Sallow – photography

== Charts ==
Chart performance for Latin Alliance
Chart (1991)	Peak position
US Billboard 200	133
US Top R&B/Hip-Hop Albums (Billboard)	83
US Heatseekers Albums (Billboard)	18
