= Hispanic Causing Panic =

Studio album by Kid Frost
- Released: July 10, 1990
- Studios: Wildcat, Los Angeles; Wide Tracks, Hollywood
- Genre: Latin hip-hop
- Length: 41:10
- Label: Virgin
- Producers: Tony G; Will Roc; the Baka Boyz; Frost; Julio G

Kid Frost chronology
Hispanic Causing Panic (1990)	East Side Story (1992)

Singles from Hispanic Causing Panic
- 1. "La Raza" Released: 1990; 2. "¡That's It! (Ya Estuvo)" Released: 1990

Hispanic Causing Panic is the debut studio album by American rapper Kid Frost. It was released in 1990 via Virgin Records and is considered one of the first Latin rap albums, setting the stage for later releases by groups like Cypress Hill. The recording sessions took place at Wildcat Studios and Wide Tracks in Los Angeles, with producers Tony G, Will Roc, the Baka Boyz, Julio G, and Kid Frost.

The album peaked at number 67 in the United States and at number 85 in the Netherlands, spawning two singles: "La Raza" and "¡That's It! (Ya Estuvo)". Its lead single, "La Raza", also charted in the Netherlands, Belgium, and the United States.

== Critical reception ==
Professional ratings
Review scores
Source	Rating
AllMusic	4/5 stars
Select	3/5 medals

The Globe and Mail concluded that Kid Frost "spends more time ignoring his heritage than exploiting it, so the cleverly titled album mostly comes across as just another rhyme-and-swagger fest."

== Track listing ==
No.	Title	Writer(s)	Producer(s)	Length
1.	"La Raza"	Arturo Molina, Jr.; Antonio Gonzalez; Gerald Wilson	Tony G.	3:29
2.	"Hold Your Own"	Arturo Molina, Jr.; Nick Vidal; Eric Vidal	The Baker Boyz; Tony G.	3:40
3.	"Straight to the Bank"	Mark Santiago; Nick Vidal; Eric Vidal	The Baker Boyz; Tony G. (co.)	3:51
4.	"Come Together"	Arturo Molina, Jr.; William Griffin	Will Roc	5:07
5.	"Smoke"	Arturo Molina, Jr.; Antonio Gonzalez	Tony G.; Frost	4:02
6.	"Ya Estuvo" (That's It)	George Perez; William Griffin	Will Roc; Frost	4:05
7.	"Homicide"	Arturo Molina, Jr.; Antonio Gonzalez	Tony G.; Julio G.	3:52
8.	"Hispanic Causing Panic"	Arturo Molina, Jr.; Alvin Trivette; 3rd Generation	The Baker Boyz; Will Roc (co.)	3:29
9.	"In the City"	Arturo Molina, Jr.; William Griffin	Will Roc	4:47
10.	"La Raza" (Cantana Mix)	Arturo Molina, Jr.; Antonio Gonzalez; Gerald Wilson	Tony G.	4:41
Total length:				41:10

== Personnel ==
- Arturo Molina Jr. – vocals, producer (tracks: 5, 6)
- Mitch Rafel – saxophone (tracks: 1, 10)
- Darrell "Bob Dog" Robertson – guitar (track 4)
- Tommy D. – harmonica (track 6)
- "Professor" Dwight Baldwin – percussion (tracks: 5, 6)
- Antonio Gonzalez – percussion (tracks: 6, 7), producer (tracks: 1, 2, 5, 7, 10), co-producer (track 3)
- Kevin Gilliam – scratches (tracks: 4, 9)
- Julio Gonzalez – scratches & producer (track 7)
- Nick Vidal – scratches (track 8), producer (tracks: 2, 3, 8)
- Eric Vidal – producer (tracks: 2, 3, 8)
- William L. Griffin – producer (tracks: 4, 6, 9), co-producer (track 8), mixing (track 10)
- Mark Williams – mixing, A&R
- Josh Schneider – recording, mixing (track 10)
- David Grant – recording
- Dennis "Def-Pea" Parker – recording
- John Cavetello – recording
- Stephen Marcussen – mastering
- Melanie Nissen – art direction, photography
- Steve J. Gerdes – design

== Charts ==
Chart (1990)	Peak position
Dutch Albums (Album Top 100)	85
US Billboard 200	67
US Top R&B/Hip-Hop Albums (Billboard)	45
