= Deez Nuts =

"Deez nuts" or deez nutz is a euphemism and slang term for testicles.

Deez Nuts may also refer to:

== Media ==
- "Deez Nuts", a song by A.L.T. from the 1993 album Stone Cold World
- "Deez Nuts", a song by Mr. Serv-On from the 2001 album Take a Sip
- "Deeez Nuuuts", a song by Dr. Dre from the 1992 album The Chronic
- Deez Nuts (band), Australian hardcore punk band
- Battle Break Deez Nuts, a battle break released by Battle Axe Records, and volume two

== Other uses ==
- Deez Nuts (satirist) (born Brady C. Olson, 1999/2000), satirical candidate for the 2016 US presidential election
- Feastables Peanut Butter, a type of chocolate by Feastables, formerly known as Deez Nutz Chocolate
- Common punchline for a ligma joke
