= Who Ride wit Us: Tha Compalation, Vol. 1 =

Compilation album by Daz Dillinger
- Released: October 30, 2001
- Recorded: 1997–2001
- Genres: West Coast hip hop; gangsta rap; G-funk
- Length: 1:49:20
- Label: D.P.G. Recordz
- Producers: Daz Dillinger (exec.); Mike Dean; Soopafly; Battlecat; Bigg Blue; Blaqthoven; C&H; DJ Aladdin; Done Deal Recordz; Fredwreck; Jermaine Dupri; L.T. Hutton; Snoop Dogg; Warren G; Young Bleed

Daz Dillinger chronology
| Who Ride wit Us: Tha Compalation, Vol. 1 (2001) | To Live and Die in CA (2002) |

Professional ratings
Review scores
| Source | Rating |
|---|---|
| Allmusic | 3/5 stars |

Who Ride Wit Us: Tha Compalation, Vol. 1 is the first compilation album by American West Coast hip hop recording artist Daz Dillinger. It was released on October 30, 2001 through D.P.G. Recordz. A sequel to this album, Who Ride wit Us: Tha Compalation, Vol. 2, was released on October 29, 2002.

== Track listing ==
1. Git Cha Walk On feat. Xzibit & WC
2. I Don't Know Why feat. Lucc Lucciono
3. We Yell Hey Hoo feat. C-Murder
4. Hustlaz feat. Young Bleed & Homeyz
5. Crippin' feat. C-Bo
6. Here We Go Now feat. Hit From Tha LBC
7. Who Wants 2 Be a Dope M.C.? feat. Helter Skelter & Kurupt
8. Don't Be Foolish feat. Snoop Dogg & Kurupt
9. O/G 2 Me feat. Scarface & Kurupt
10. Clocc'n C Notes feat. Made Men, Tray Deee, Kurupt & Soopafly
11. We Came feat. E-40, The Click, Snoop Dogg, Nate Dogg, Kurupt
12. What Ya Gonna Do? feat. Doggy's Angels
13. It Might Sound Crazy (Remix) feat. Too Short
14. Your Love Is tha Shit feat. SFTP
15. Animalz feat. 3Tre Tha Hardway
16. Put tha Monkey in It feat. Soopafly
17. Westside and Eastside feat. MC Eiht
18. Bustaz feat. Lil' C-Style, Legaci, Tray Deee, RBX
19. U Make Me Wanna feat. Usher
20. Why Oh Why? feat. Warren G & Kurupt
21. Turf Stories feat. Mac Shawn & Tray Deee
22. Affiliated feat. 3Tre Tha Hardway & Woo
23. Play feat. J Lo
24. Fyde Ryde feat. Sherm & Tex Mex
25. Do You Know What You Talkin' About? feat. Young Weee
