= La Familia (song) =

1996 single by Frost featuring Rich Garcia

Single by Frost featuring Rich Garcia

from the album Smile Now, Die Later
- Released: 1996
- Recorded: 1995
- Length: 4:03
- Label: Ruthless; Relativity
- Songwriters: Arturo Molina, Jr.; Alvin Trivette
- Producers: Tony G; Julio G

Frost singles chronology
"East Side Rendezvous" (1995)	"La Familia" (1996)	"La Raza II" (1996)

Music video
- "La Familia" on YouTube

"La Familia" is a song by American rapper Frost and the second single from his third studio album, Smile Now, Die Later (1995). Produced by Tony G and Julio G, the song samples elements from "Family Affair" by Sly and the Family Stone and features vocals from Rich Garcia. It peaked at numbers 69 and 77 on the US Cash Box Top 100 and Billboard Hot 100 charts.

== Charts ==
Chart (1996)	Peak position
US Billboard Hot 100	77
US Hot Rap Songs (Billboard)	39
US Rhythmic Airplay (Billboard)	35
US Cash Box Top 100	69
