= Tha Dogg Pound Gangsta LP =

Studio album by Daz Dillinger
- Released: January 25, 2005
- Studio: Gangsta Advisory Studios, Dogg Pound County, MS
- Genre: West Coast hip hop
- Length: 1:13:52
- Label: Gangsta Advisory Recordingz
- Producer: Daz Dillinger (also exec.); Fredwreck; Ivan Johnson; Soopafly

Daz Dillinger chronology
| I Got Love in These Streetz (2004) | Tha Dogg Pound Gangsta LP (2005) | Gangsta Crunk (2005) |

Professional ratings
Review scores
| Source | Rating |
|---|---|
| AllHipHop | 3/5 |
| AllMusic | 3/5 stars |
| Rapreviews | 7/10 |
| Sputnikmusic | 4.5/5 |

Tha Dogg Pound Gangsta LP is the sixth solo studio album by American rapper and record producer Daz Dillinger. It was released on January 25, 2005, through Gangsta Advisory Recordingz. Production was handled by Daz himself, Ivan Johnson, Fredwreck and Soopafly. It features guest appearances from Shelly, Andrea Gray, George Clinton, Nate Dogg and Shorty B. The album did not reach the Billboard 200, however it peaked at number 82 on the Top R&B/Hip-Hop Albums and number 28 on the Independent Albums charts in the United States.

== Track listing ==
| No. | Title | Writer(s) | Producer(s) | Length |
|---|---|---|---|---|
| 1. | "That's the Way We Ride" (featuring Shorty B.) | Delmar Arnaud; Ivan Johnson; Stuart Jordan | Daz Dillinger; Ivan Johnson | 5:02 |
| 2. | "Do You Think About" (featuring Shelly) | Arnaud; Johnson; S. Jordan | Daz Dillinger; Ivan Johnson | 3:54 |
| 3. | "Everybody Givin' It Up" (featuring Shelly) | Arnaud; M. Jordan; Johnson; Shelly | Daz Dillinger; Ivan Johnson | 4:11 |
| 4. | "'N tha Yard (Interlude)" | Arnaud; Johnson | | 1:17 |
| 5. | "Nothin' Can Stop Us Now" (featuring George Clinton) | Arnaud; George Clinton; M. Jordan | Daz Dillinger; Ivan Johnson | 4:52 |
| 6. | "Do U Know" | Arnaud; Johnson | Daz Dillinger; Ivan Johnson | 4:31 |
| 7. | "The Funeral (Skit)" | Arnaud; Johnson | | 0:55 |
| 8. | "Fuck Dreamin' tha Same Dream" (featuring Andrea Gray) | Arnaud; Farid Nassar | Fredwreck | 4:14 |
| 9. | "My Mama Said" | Arnaud; M. Jordan; Johnson | Daz Dillinger; Ivan Johnson | 4:17 |
| 10. | "My Ambitionz az a Ridah 2005" | Arnaud; M. Jordan; Johnson | Daz Dillinger; Ivan Johnson | 4:15 |
| 11. | "Hey...How Ya' Doin'" | Arnaud; Johnson | Daz Dillinger; Ivan Johnson | 4:32 |
| 12. | "Come Close" (featuring Nate Dogg) | Arnaud; Nathaniel Hale; Johnson | Daz Dillinger; Ivan Johnson | 4:06 |
| 13. | "Rocc wit Daz" | Arnaud; Johnson | Daz Dillinger; Ivan Johnson | 4:10 |
| 14. | "Bomb Azz Pussy 2005" | Arnaud; Johnson | Daz Dillinger; Ivan Johnson | 4:22 |
| 15. | "Nigga Gotta Hustle It Up" | Arnaud; Johnson | Daz Dillinger; Ivan Johnson | 4:49 |
| 16. | "Gittin' Buccwild" | Arnaud; Priest Brooks | Daz Dillinger; Soopafly | 4:23 |
| 17. | "Git a Dose of Dis Hot Ish" | Arnaud; M. Jordan; Johnson | Daz Dillinger; Ivan Johnson | 3:48 |
| 18. | "Tha Dogg Pound Gangsta" | Arnaud; Johnson | Daz Dillinger; Ivan Johnson | 4:14 |
| 19. | "Fuck tha Police 2005" | Arnaud; Johnson | Daz Dillinger; Ivan Johnson | 2:00 |
| Total length: | | | | 1:13:52 |

== Personnel ==
- Delmar "Daz Dillinger" Arnaud – vocals, producer (tracks: 1–3, 5, 6, 9–19), executive producer
- Ricky Harris – vocals (track 1)
- Stuart "Shorty B" Jordan – bass (track 1)
- Shelly – vocals (tracks: 2, 3)
- George Clinton – vocals (track 5)
- Andrea Gray – vocals (track 8)
- Nathaniel "Nate Dogg" Hale – vocals (track 12)
- Young Buck – additional vocals (track 16)
- Ivan Johnson – producer (tracks: 1–3, 5, 6, 9–15, 17–19)
- Farid "Fredwreck" Nassar – producer (track 8)
- Priest "Soopafly" Brooks – producer (track 16)
- Lasoniata Shaw – mixing
- Adam Hill – assistant engineering
- Kevin Nick – mastering
- Larry Nick – mastering
- Alex "Toon" Deligiannis – design

== Charts ==
| Chart (2005) | Peak position |
|---|---|
| US Top R&B/Hip-Hop Albums (Billboard) | 82 |
| US Independent Albums (Billboard) | 28 |
