= Who Ride wit Us: Tha Compalation, Vol. 2 =

Compilation album by Daz Dillinger
- Released: October 29, 2002
- Recorded: 2002
- Genre: West Coast hip hop, gangsta rap, G-funk
- Label: D.P.G. Recordz
- Producer: Daz Dillinger (also exec.); Big Hollis; Fredwreck; Prodeje; Soopafly; Mr. Mixx; Albeezy; Blaqthoven; Jone; Sin

Daz Dillinger chronology
To Live and Die in CA (2002)	Who Ride wit Us: Tha Compalation, Vol. 2 (2002)	Who Ride wit Us Vol. 3 (2008)

Professional ratings
Review scores
Source	Rating
Allmusic	1.5/5 stars

Who Ride wit Us: Tha Compalation, Vol. 2 is the third compilation album by American rapper Daz Dillinger. It was released on October 29, 2002 through D.P.G. Recordz.

== Track listing ==
1. Intro—Y'All Want This Party Started feat. J-Ro
2. Get Yo $ feat. Albeezy, JT the Bigga Figga
3. Huh What feat. South Central Cartel
4. We Do This Passion [Remix]
5. Do U Wanna Roll Wit Me feat. DNA, Do'Boy
6. Addicted feat. Skee 64Oz
7. Put in Work feat. Don Cisco, Kid Frost
8. Ride Wit Me feat. E.S.G., Slim Thug
9. U Know What We Came Here 4 feat. Uncle Like, Sciryl
10. This Is What Happens in tha Club
11. Because of U Girl [OG Mix] feat. E.D.I., Storm
12. I Gotta Git This Money feat. DNA, Do'Boy
13. It's That Westcoast Way We're Livin' feat. E-40, Goldie Loc, Master P, Snoop Dogg, WC
14. Fucc Wit Us We Gon' Hurt Somebody!
15. Tha Rep & tha Name
