= Stone Cold World =

Studio album by A.L.T.
- Released: September 21, 1993
- Recorded: 1992–1993
- Genre: Latin rap
- Length: 35:57
- Label: Par
- Producer: Tony G.; The Unknown DJ; Star Traxx; Geoff Rios

A.L.T. chronology
Another Latin Timebomb (1992)	Stone Cold World (1993)	The Resurrection (2009)

Singles from Stone Cold World
- 1. "Ridin' High" Released: 1993; 2. "All Nite Long" Released: 1993

Professional ratings
Review scores
Source	Rating
Rolling Stone	2/5 stars

Stone Cold World is the second album by Latino-American rapper A.L.T. It was released on September 21, 1993. The ten-track album features guest appearances from Rich Garcia.

== Track listing ==
No.	Title	Producer(s)	Length
1.	"Ridin' High" (featuring Rich Garcia)	Star Traxx; Tony G.	3:47
2.	"Deez Nutz"	Star Traxx; Tony G.	3:25
3.	"Audi 5000"	Star Traxx; Tony G.	3:20
4.	"All Nite Long"	Star Traxx; Tony G.	3:54
5.	"Just Go Blank"	Star Traxx; Tony G.	3:14
6.	"Take You Back"	The Unknown DJ	3:39
7.	"17 Shots"	Star Traxx; Tony G.	3:05
8.	"Get Out My Life"	Geoff Rios; Star Traxx; Tony G.	4:32
9.	"Heaven Can't Wait"	Star Traxx; Tony G.	3:26
10.	"Stone Cold World" (featuring Rich Garcia)	Star Traxx; Tony G.	3:31
Total length:			35:57

== Personnel ==
- Andre "The Unknown DJ" Manuel - producer (track 6), executive producer
- Alvin Trivette - main artist
- Cliff Badowski - photography
- Kevin Reeves - mastering
- Mike "Webeboomindashit" Edwards - recording and mixing (tracks 2–10)
- Richard - recording and mixing (tracks 1)
- Star Traxx - producer (tracks 1–5, 7–10)
- Tony Gonzalez - producer (tracks 1–5, 7–10), executive producer
- Wendy Sherman - art direction, design
