= Smile Now, Die Later =

Studio album by Frost
- Released: October 24, 1995
- Recorded: 1994–1995
- Studio: G-Spot (El Monte, CA); The Edge Recording Studio (Inglewood, CA)
- Genre: Latin hip hop; gangsta rap
- Length: 52:59
- Label: Ruthless; Relativity
- Producer: Tony G; Julio G; Cold 187um; Monte Carlo; Richard Preuss; Frost

Frost chronology
East Side Story (1992)	Smile Now, Die Later (1995)	When Hell.A. Freezes Over (1997)

Singles from Smile Now, Die Later
- 1. "East Side Rendezvous" Released: 1995; 2. "La Familia" Released: January 1996; 3. "La Raza II" Released: 1996

Professional ratings
Review scores
Source	Rating
AllMusic	3/5 stars

Smile Now, Die Later is the third studio album by American rapper Frost (formerly known as Kid Frost). It was released on October 24, 1995 via Ruthless/Relativity Records, making it his first full-length for the label. The twelve-track album features guest appearances from Above the Law, A.L.T., Kokane, O.G.Enius, Rick James, Rich Garcia and Diane Gordon. The album peaked at #119 on the Billboard 200, #36 on the Top R&B/Hip-Hop Albums chart and #2 on the Heatseekers Albums chart. It spawned three singles: "East Side Rendezvous", "La Familia" and "La Raza II", which also reached the Billboard charts.

== Track listing ==
No.	Title	Producer(s)	Length
1.	"East Side Rendezvous" (featuring A.L.T., O.G.Enius & Diane Gordon)	Monte Carlo	4:33
2.	"La Familia" (featuring Rich Garcia)	Tony G; Julio G	4:03
3.	"You Ain't Right"	Richard "Rikko" Preuss	4:58
4.	"Mari" (featuring Rick James)	Tony G; Julio G; Frost	5:11
5.	"Nothing But Love for the Neighborhood" (featuring Rich Garcia)	Tony G	4:51
6.	"Rest in Peace" (featuring Rich Garcia)	Tony G; Julio G	4:34
7.	"La Raza II"	Tony G; Julio G	3:47
8.	"Bamseeya"	Cold 187um	4:22
9.	"Look at What I See" (featuring A.L.T. & Diane Gordon)	Tony G; Julio G	3:52
10.	"How Many Ways Can You Lose a Body" (featuring A.L.T. & O.G.Enius)	Cold 187um	4:25
11.	"Last Days" (featuring Above The Law & Kokane)	Cold 187um	4:16
12.	"Youseemurda" (featuring G-Spot-Geez)	Tony G; Julio G	4:07
Total length:			52:59

== Chart history ==
Chart (1995)	Peak position
US Billboard 200	119
US Top R&B/Hip-Hop Albums (Billboard)	36
US Heatseekers Albums (Billboard)	2
