= The General's List =

Compilation album by Big Tray Deee
- Released: August 20, 2002
- Genre: West Coast hip hop; Gangsta rap
- Length: 68:02
- Label: Empire Music Werks
- Producer: Ruffino (exec.); 12 Sinatra; The 4th Dimension; Battlecat; Boretta; Devastating; DJ Silk; Dr. Dre; Fredwreck; Manny; Meech Wells; Tony Touch

Big Tray Deee chronology
Duces 'n Trayz (2001)	The General's List (2002)	The Original O.G. (2009)

Singles from The General's List
- 1. "Izuwitit" Released: 2002

The General's List is a compilation presented by American rapper Big Tray Deee, released August 20, 2002 on Empire Music Werks. The album features production by Battlecat, DJ Silk, Dr. Dre, Fredwreck, Meech Wells and Tony Touch. It peaked at number 95 on the Billboard 200 and at number 21 on the Billboard Top R&B/Hip-Hop Albums. The album features performances by Snoop Dogg, Tha Eastsidaz, 40 Glocc, L.V., Outlawz, Bad Azz and Kokane. To promote the album, one single was released, for the song, "Izuwitit".

== Critical reception ==
Tower Records - "...his approach to hip-hop is very much in line with Snoop's style. The classic G-Funk sound jumps out of every track here, that laid-back groove insinuating itself into one's bones...Tray Deee manages the difficult feat of presenting a hardened character comfortable with violence, crime, and misogyny while somehow managing to maintain a light-hearted, even likable tone..."

== Track listing ==
#	Title	Performer	Producer	Time
1	"Intro"	Mac Minister	MannyMusic	0:48
2	"I Can Make You Dance"	Tray Deee, Big Rocc	Tony Touch	3:53
3	"Fine"	Snoop Dogg, Lil' ½ Dead	Meech Wells	3:39
4	"Questionz"	Icebergh	12 Sinatra	4:06
5	"Izuwitit"	Tray Deee	Fredwreck	4:21
6	"LA"	K.F. Klik	Devastating	4:15
7	"Finer Thangzzz"	40 Glocc, L.V.	Dr. Dre	3:32
8	"Thugzzz Pray II"	Outlawz	DJ Silk	5:26
9	"Hard Timez on Planet Earth"	Tray Deee, Bad Azz	The Chill 'CMW"	3:24
10	"Big Ballin"	Tray Deee	Fredwreck	3:24
11	"Shynnin"	Boretta, Asiah	Boretta	2:46
12	"Enjoy Yourself"	Boom Bam	MannyMusic	3:24
13	"Blazin Endo"	Tray Deee, Boom Bam	MannyMusic	4:04
14	"Clap Yo Handz"	IV Life Family, Kokane	The 4th Dimension	4:25
15	"Fuck a Suit"	Tray Deee, Goldie Loc, Baby Chico, Icebergh	MannyMusic	4:15
16	"Tearing Shit Up"	Money Green, Manish Flats	DJ Silk	4:42
17	"Street Sweepin"	Tray Deee, Boom Bam, Big Rocc	Battlecat	4:23

== Chart history ==
Chart (2002)	Peak position
U.S. Billboard 200	95
U.S. Billboard Top R&B/Hip-Hop Albums	21
