= Dear Mr. President (Fredwreck song) =

2004 anti-war song

Single by Various Artists
- Released: 2004
- Genre: Rap
- Length: 7:14
- Producer: Fredwreck

"Dear Mr. President" is a protest song by the hip-hop producer Fredwreck. It is available free on the Internet, but was not originally released on a CD due to its controversial nature. It is also available on Fredwrecks' Greatest Hits Episode 1 CD.

== History ==
The politically charged song is directed at George W. Bush, criticizing him for the war in Iraq. The single was released as part of the S.T.O.P. movement by Fredwreck, which was a group formed to protest the Iraq War and only released this song and one other.

It features Everlast, Mobb Deep, The Alchemist, Mack 10, WC, Evidence, Defari, KRS-One and B-Real.

Financial and time constraints meant that this song had to be recorded in parts. Mobb Deep's vocals were recorded using a laptop in a hotel room.
