= Still Up in This Shit! =

Studio album by Frost
- Released: April 23, 2002
- Recorded: 2001–2002
- Genre: Latin hip hop; gangsta rap
- Length: 58:30
- Label: Hit A Lick Records; Koch
- Producer: Battlecat; DEV R.F.; Ernie "Ern Dog" Medina; Fredwreck; Klev; Lil' Lee; Tony G.

Frost chronology
That Was Then, This Is Now, Vol. 2 (2000)	Still Up in This Shit! (2002)	Welcome to Frost Angeles (2005)

Singles from Still Up in This Shit!
- 1. "Put In Work" Released: 2002; 2. "Everybody Knows" Released: 2002

Professional ratings
Review scores
Source	Rating
AllMusic	2.5/5 stars

Still Up in This Shit! (also spelled Still Up in This S#*+) is the seventh studio album by American rapper Frost. It was released on April 23, 2002, via Hit A Lick Records and Koch Entertainment. The album peaked at #183 on the Billboard 200, at #30 on the Top R&B/Hip-Hop Albums chart, and #12 on the Independent Albums chart. It spawned two singles: "Put in Work" featuring Daz Dillinger, and "Everybody Knows", but both of them failed to chart.

== Track listing ==
No.	Title	Writer(s)	Producer(s)	Length
1.	"Still Up in the S#*+!" (Intro)	Arturo Molina Jr.; Francisco Soto	Ernesto "Ern Dogg" Medina	5:06
2.	"Follow Us"	Molina Jr.; K-Borne	D.J. Klev	4:28
3.	"Ghetto Curse"	Molina Jr.; Alvin Trivette; Elijah Blue Molina	DEV R.F.	4:26
4.	"Put in Work" (featuring Daz Dillinger)	Molina Jr.; Delmar Arnaud; Soto	Fredwreck	5:01
5.	"Everybody Knows" (featuring Mellow Man Ace)	Molina Jr.; Nino Brown	DJ Battlecat	5:07
6.	"Where My Ese's At?"	Molina Jr.; Rayes Solis Rodrigues	Tony G	4:39
7.	"My Primos" (featuring The Latin Fros and Baby Beesh)	Molina Jr.	Tony G	5:04
8.	"Natural Born Hustlers"	Molina Jr.; Soto	DEV R.F.	4:31
9.	"Hit a Lick Auditions" (Skit)			1:10
10.	"Got What U Want"	Molina Jr.; Rodrigues	Lil' Lee	4:19
11.	"Nu Bitch Nu Twist" (featuring A.L.T., K Borne, Nino Brown, Slow Pain and Don Cisco)	Molina Jr.; Trivette; K-Borne; Brown; Slow Pain; Soto	Tony G	4:11
12.	"I'm Still Here" (featuring Tierra)		Tony G	4:24
13.	"Para Mi Abuelita / Cannabis"	Molina Jr.		6:04
Total length:				58:30

== Chart history ==
Chart (2002)	Peak position
US Billboard 200	183
US Top R&B/Hip-Hop Albums (Billboard)	30
US Independent Albums (Billboard)	12
