= To Live and Die in CA =

Compilation album by Daz Dillinger
- Released: October 1, 2002
- Recorded: 2002
- Genre: West Coast hip hop, gangsta rap
- Label: D.P.G. Recordz
- Producer: Daz Dillinger, Big Oso & Gangsta Dre

Daz Dillinger chronology
Who Ride wit Us: Tha Compalation, Vol. 1 (2001)	To Live and Die in CA (2002)	Who Ride wit Us: Tha Compalation, Vol. 2 (2002)

Professional ratings
Review scores
Source	Rating
AllMusic	2.5/5 stars

To Live and Die in CA is the second compilation album by rapper Daz Dillinger. It was released on October 1, 2002 through D.P.G. Recordz.

== Track listing ==
Title	Performer	Producer
01. To Live and Die In CA	Daz Dillinger (feat. Skee 64)	Daz Dillinger
02. Uh	847	Lokei
03. Get Paid	Bad Azz (feat. The Lowlifes & Sylk-E. Fyne)	Fingaz
04. Win Lose Or Draw	Gangsta Dre	Gangsta Dre
05. Make Money	Xzibit (feat. Soopafly & King T)	Chocolate
06. I Ain't Playin'	Yukmouth (feat. Mal B, J-Mack & Hollow Tip)	Slump Factory
07. Make It Happen	Outlawz (feat. Ghetto Starz & Baby Bubb)	Slump Factory
08. Strapped Down Wit A Gun	T-Nutty	K.G.
09. Whatever It Takes	Turf Hoggs (feat. Keak Da Sneak)	
10. Real N***az	Daz Dillinger (feat. Young Ridah)	Big Hollis
11. Freakplay	Mr. Luv (feat. B-Legit)	Pee-Wee
12. Gotta Watch	Ecay-Uno (feat. Cee Wee 3 & Chag G)	Ecay Uno
13. Streetlife	Hachet (feat. Messy Marv)	Big Hollis
14. Slugz 4 A Sucka Ene D**k 4 A B**ch	Woodie (feat. Lou-E-Lou)	Woodie
15. Gangsta Pimpin'	Kurupt (feat. Don Cisco)	Dj Fingaz
16. Thug A** N***az	MC Eiht (feat. K.A.T.)	Kat
17. It's All On A Hoe	D-Mack The Assassin	Big Hollis
18. California Livin'	Kaoz	
19. B**chez Ain't S**t	Skee 64 (feat. T-Nutty, Luni Coleone & I-Rocc)	
