= I Got Love in These Streetz =

Studio album by Daz Dillinger
- Released: September 7, 2004
- Genre: West Coast hip hop
- Length: 65:15
- Label: Gangsta Advisory
- Producer: Daz Dillinger

Daz Dillinger chronology
| DPGC: U Know What I'm Throwin' Up (2003) | I Got Love in These Streetz (2004) | Tha Dogg Pound Gangsta LP (2005) |

Professional ratings
Review scores
| Source | Rating |
|---|---|
| Allmusic | link |

I Got Love In These Streetz is the fifth studio album by rapper Daz Dillinger. It was later re-released featuring over 10 bonus tracks.

== Track listing ==
1. Intro 0:47
2. I Got Love in These Streetz (produced by L.T. Hutton, engineered by Duke) 4:02
3. It Feels Good 2 Be from tha Westcoast (feat. Pornostyle) 3:50
4. Feel It (feat. Bun B) 3:55
5. That's What She Do 1:58
6. Tha Life of a Playa 1:22
7. Get Hi 2:15
8. If U Want 2 Fuck wit Me (feat. Houston's Finest) 4:16
9. My System (Tha Remix) 4:43
10. I Can't Spend tha Night (feat. Crystal & Shon-Don (Of P.F.N.)) 3:59
11. It's Just tha Way You Move (feat. Gail Gotti) 4:17
12. Shake the Booty (produced by L.T. Hutton, engineered by Duke) 3:31
13. Callin' My Name 4:37
14. Shoot 'Em Up (feat. Crystal & Shon-Don (Of P.F.N.)) 4:33
15. Gangsta Summer 3:16
16. Love & Happiness 4:38
17. When tha Feelin' Is Right (feat. Porscha, The Wicked Witch Of Tha South" & Licorishe) 4:44
18. I'ma Get Mine Anyway (feat. 5th Ward Boyz) 4:32

I GOT LOVE IN THESE STREETZ EP (2002)

1. Intro 0:45
2. I Got Love in These Streets 4:00
3. Only Move 4 tha Money (So We Comin' Up) Featuring – 2Pac, Bad Azz, Makaveli 3:13
4. It's Just the Way U Move Featuring – Gail Gotti 4:16
5. Callin' My Name 4:37
6. Shake the Booty 3:31
7. Love:Happiness 4:38
8. When tha Feelin' Is Right Featuring [Uncredited] – Licorishe, Porsha "Tha Wicked Witch Of Tha South" 4:46
9. Im'a Get Mine Anyway Featuring – 5th Ward Boyz 4:33
