= East Side Story (Kid Frost album) =

Studio album by Kid Frost
- Released: April 21, 1992
- Recorded: 1991–1992
- Genre: West Coast hip hop; gangsta rap; latin hip hop
- Length: 57:51
- Label: Virgin
- Producer: Frost; Will Roc; Tony G; Mr. Mixx; Geoff Rios; Mike Greene; K-Cut

Kid Frost chronology
| Hispanic Causing Panic (1990) | East Side Story (1992) | Smile Now, Die Later (1995) |

Singles from East Side Story
- 1. "No Sunshine" Released: 1992; 2. "Thin Line" Released: 1992; 3. "Another Firme Rola (Bad Because I'm Brown)" Released: 1992

Professional ratings
Review scores
| Source | Rating |
|---|---|
| AllMusic | 2/5 stars |
| Robert Christgau | (2-star Honorable Mention) |

East Side Story is the second studio album by American rapper Kid Frost. It was released in 1992 through Virgin Records, making it his final album for the label and also his last album under the alias of 'Kid Frost', as he would change his name to 'Frost'. Production was handled by Will Roc, Tony G., Mr. Mixx of 2 Live Crew, Geoff Rios, Mike Greene, K-Cut and Frost himself. The album features guest appearances from Rich Garcia, Boo-Yaa T.R.I.B.E., A.L.T., Denetria Champ, Joe Harris, MC Eiht of Compton's Most Wanted, Prince Teddy and Scringer Ranks.

The album peaked at number 73 on the Billboard 200 albums chart and at number 54 on the Top R&B/Hip-Hop Albums chart in the United States. It spawned three singles: "No Sunshine", "Thin Line" and "Another Firme Rola (Bad Cause I'm Brown)". Its lead single, "No Sunshine", made it to #95 on the Billboard Hot 100 singles chart and #20 on the Hot Rap Songs chart. "Thin Line" reached #11 on the Hot Rap Songs chart but failed to enter the Hot 100 and "Another Firme Rola (Bad Cause I'm Brown)" did not chart at all.

== Track listing ==
| No. | Title | Producer(s) | Length |
|---|---|---|---|
| 1. | "The Man" | Will Roc; Kid Frost | 1:09 |
| 2. | "East Side Story" | Geoff Rios; Mike Greene; Kid Frost | 4:34 |
| 3. | "The Volo" | Mr. Mixx | 3:49 |
| 4. | "I Got Pulled Over" (featuring MC Eiht & A.L.T.) | Mr. Mixx; Kid Frost | 4:21 |
| 5. | "Penitentiary" (featuring Boo-Yaa T.R.I.B.E.) | Will Roc; Kid Frost | 4:35 |
| 6. | "No Sunshine" (featuring Prince Teddy) | Mr. Mixx; Kid Frost | 4:50 |
| 7. | "Thin Line" (featuring Denetria Champ & Boo-Yaa T.R.I.B.E.) | Will Roc | 6:03 |
| 8. | "Spaced Out" | | 0:47 |
| 9. | "These Stories Have to Be Told" (featuring Rich Garcia) | Tony G. | 3:58 |
| 10. | "Home Boyz" (featuring Scringer Ranks) | K-Cut | 3:11 |
| 11. | "Chaos on the Streets of East L.A." | | 0:57 |
| 12. | "No More Wars" (featuring Rich Garcia) | Tony G. | 4:03 |
| 13. | "Raza Unite" | | 0:33 |
| 14. | "Smiling Faces" (featuring Joe Harris) | Geoff Rios; Mike Greene; Tony G. (add.) | 4:45 |
| 15. | "Another Firme Rola (Bad Cause I'm Brown)" | Geoff Rios; Mike Greene | 3:09 |
| 16. | "Throwing Q-Vo's" | Will Roc | 3:01 |
| 17. | "Mi Vida Loca" (featuring Rich Garcia) | Tony G. | 4:06 |
| Total length: | | | 57:51 |

== Personnel ==
- Arturo Molina Jr. – rap vocals, producer (tracks: 1–2, 4–6)
- Aaron Tyler – rap vocals (track 4)
- Alvin Trivette – rap vocals (track 4)
- Paul Devoux – rap vocals (track 5)
- Prince Teddy – vocals (track 6)
- DeNetria Champ – vocals (track 7)
- Rich Garcia – vocals (tracks: 9, 12, 17)
- Scringer Ranks – vocals (track 10)
- Joe Harris – vocals (track 14)
- Boo-Yaa T.R.I.B.E. – backing vocals (tracks: 5, 7)
- Bobby Loco – additional backing vocals (track 5)
- Ken Strong – additional backing vocals (track 5), drums (track 16), additional drums (track 7)
- Mike Sanna – additional backing vocals (track 5)
- William L. Griffin – keyboards (tracks: 1, 5, 7), producer (tracks: 1, 5, 7, 16)
- Ronnie King – keyboards (track 9)
- Lafayette Trey Stone III – guitar (track 14)
- Mike "Crazy Neck" Sims – guitar & bass (track 15)
- Eric C. Ajaye – bass (tracks: 3, 6)
- Danny Devoux – bass (tracks: 5, 7)
- Anton Pukshansky – bass guitar (track 10)
- Mitch Rafel – saxophone (tracks: 2, 7)
- Danny "Dice" Padilla – saxophone (track 17)
- Todd Alexander – drums & percussion (tracks: 1, 4), coordinator
- "Professor" Dwight Baldwin – percussion (tracks: 2, 12, 17)
- Antonio Gonzalez – percussion (track 17), producer (tracks: 9, 12, 17), additional producer (track 14)
- Ralph Medrano – scratches (tracks: 2, 15, 16)
- Geoff Rios – producer (tracks: 2, 14, 15)
- Mike Greene – producer (tracks: 2, 14, 15)
- David P. Hobbs – producer (tracks: 3, 4, 6)
- Kevin McKenzie – producer & mixing (track 10)
- Mark Williams – coordinator
- Stephen Marcussen – mastering
- Steve Gerdes – art direction & design
- Tom Dolan – design
- Mark Machado – illustration

== Chart history ==
| Chart (1992) | Peak position |
|---|---|
| US Billboard 200 | 73 |
| US Top R&B/Hip-Hop Albums (Billboard) | 54 |
