= La Raza (song) =

Single by Kid Frost

from the album Hispanic Causing Panic
- B-side: "In the City"
- Released: 1990
- Genre: West Coast hip-hop; Latin hip hop; Chicano rap; Gangsta rap
- Length: 3:29
- Label: Virgin
- Songwriters: Arturo Molina, Jr.; Antonio Gonzalez; Gerald Wilson
- Producer: Tony G.

Kid Frost singles chronology
"Terminator" (1985)	"La Raza" (1990)	"Ya Estuvo" (1990)

Music video
- "La Raza" on YouTube

"La Raza" is a song by American rapper Kid Frost, released in 1990 by Virgin Records, as the lead single from his debut studio album, Hispanic Causing Panic (1990). "La Raza" is Spanish for "the race" or more symbolically "the people" as metonymy; it samples El Chicano's "Viva Tirado" from 1970 (a cover of the famous Gerald Wilson jazz composition). The song also samples its drum track from the 1975 song The Jam by Graham Central Station. "La Raza" peaked at numbers 42 and 47 on the US Billboard Hot 100 and Cash Box Top 100 charts, number 17 in the Netherlands and number 27 in Flanders. It is considered to be one of the first successful Latin hip hop songs.

There is also a remix, featuring his son; Scoop DeVille, Lil Rob and Diamonique. The part 2 of the song is featured on Frost's third studio album, Smile Now, Die Later, released in 1995. The song was also featured in the 2004 video game Grand Theft Auto: San Andreas on the radio station, Radio Los Santos, hosted by Julio G.

== Charts ==
Chart (1990)	Peak position
Belgium (Ultratop 50 Flanders)	27
Netherlands (Single Top 100)	17
US Billboard Hot 100	42
US Hot Rap Songs (Billboard)	6
US Cash Box Top 100	47
