= No Sunshine (Kid Frost song) =

1992 single by Kid Frost

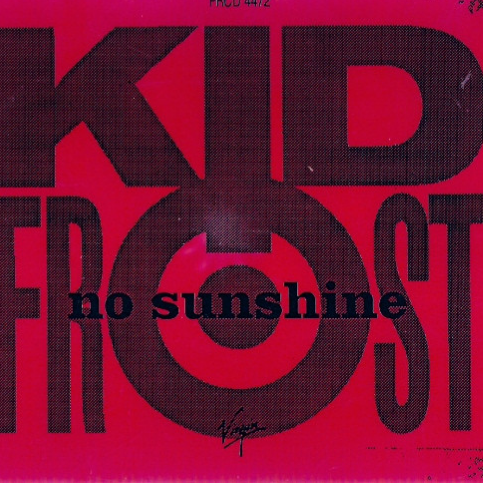

Single by Kid Frost

from the album East Side Story and American Me (Music From The Motion Picture Soundtrack)
- Released: 1992
- Genre: Chicano rap
- Length: 4:51
- Label: Virgin
- Songwriters: Arturo Molina Jr.; Bill Withers
- Producer: Mr. Mixx

Kid Frost singles chronology
"Ya Estuvo" (1990)	"No Sunshine" (1992)	"Another Firme Rola (Bad 'Cause I'm Brown)" (1992)

Music video
- "No Sunshine" on YouTube

"No Sunshine" is a song by the American rapper Kid Frost, released in 1992 by Virgin Records, as the lead single from his second album, East Side Story (1992). Produced by Mr. Mixx, the song contains a sample of "Ain't No Sunshine" by Bill Withers. It peaked at numbers 93 and 95 on the US Cash Box Top 100 and Billboard Hot 100 charts.

== Charts ==
Chart (1992)	Peak position
US Billboard Hot 100 (Billboard)	95
US Hot Rap Songs (Billboard)	20
US Cash Box Top 100	93
