= Rico Suave (song) =

Gerardo Mejía song

Single by Gerardo

from the album Mo' Ritmo
- Released: December 1990
- Recorded: 1990
- Genre: Latin hip-hop; pop rap
- Length: 4:51 (album version); 4:08 (video/single version)
- Label: Interscope; EastWest; Atlantic
- Songwriters: Christian Carlos Warren; Gerardo Mejia; Alberto Slezynger; Rosa Soy; Charles Bobbit
- Producer: Michael Sembello

Gerardo singles chronology
"Rico Suave" (1990)	"We Want the Funk" (1991)

"Rico Suave" is a song by Ecuadorian-born American rapper and singer Gerardo. It appeared on his debut album, Mo' Ritmo (1991). The track peaked at number seven on the US Billboard Hot 100 of April 13, 1991, and reached number two on the Hot Rap Singles chart a week earlier. It also reached number 17 on the US Cash Box Top 100. In the song, the narrator tells of his luck with women and his lady-loving lifestyle. It contains samples of "Give It Up or Turnit a Loose" by James Brown and "Chamo Candela" by Venezuelan tropical/dance pop group Daiquiri.

The song ranks number 100 on VH1's "100 Greatest Songs of the 90s" and number 9 on VH1's "100 Greatest One Hit Wonders". It also ranked at number 37 on Blender's list of the "50 Worst Songs Ever". In 1992, "Weird Al" Yankovic released a parody of the song titled "Taco Grande" on his album Off the Deep End.

== Music video ==
The music video for "Rico Suave" features Gerardo and several male back-up dancers. Gerardo wears an open leather jacket. The backup dancers wear white T-shirts under their oversized suit jackets. The video's intro consists of the singer and two back-up dancers squatting in front of a skyscraper with their backs to the camera. Near the end of the video, Gerardo takes his jacket off. The bilingual version of the video also details Gerardo's encounter with his date's parents, who appear less than thrilled with Gerardo.

The video was nominated for two MTV Video Music Awards for Best Male Video and Best New Artist.

== Track listing ==
=== Maxi-CD single ===
1. "Rico Suave" (Spanglish version) – 3:29
2. "Rico Suave" (Mo' Ritmo dance version) – 7:15
3. "Rico Suave" (all Spanish version) – 4:17

=== 12" single ===
1. "Rico Suave" (Spanglish version) – 4:09
2. "Rico Suave" (The More English Edit) – 3:29
3. "Rico Suave" (Mo' Ritmo dance version) – 7:15
4. "Rico Suave" (Spanish version) – 4:17

=== Remix single ===
1. "Rico Suave" – 4:09
2. "Rico Suave" (Spanish version) – 4:17
3. "Rico Suave" (Instrumental Energize Mix) – 4:09

== Charts ==
=== Weekly charts ===
Chart (1991)	Peak position
Australia (ARIA)	87
US Billboard Hot 100	7
US Hot Rap Tracks (Billboard)	2
US Cash Box Top 100	17

=== Year-end charts ===
Year-end chart (1991)	Position
US Top Pop Singles (Billboard)	89

== Certifications ==
Region	Certification	Certified units/sales
United States (RIAA)	Gold	500,000^{^}
^{^} Shipments figures based on certification alone.
