= Fredwreck =

American record producer (born 1972)

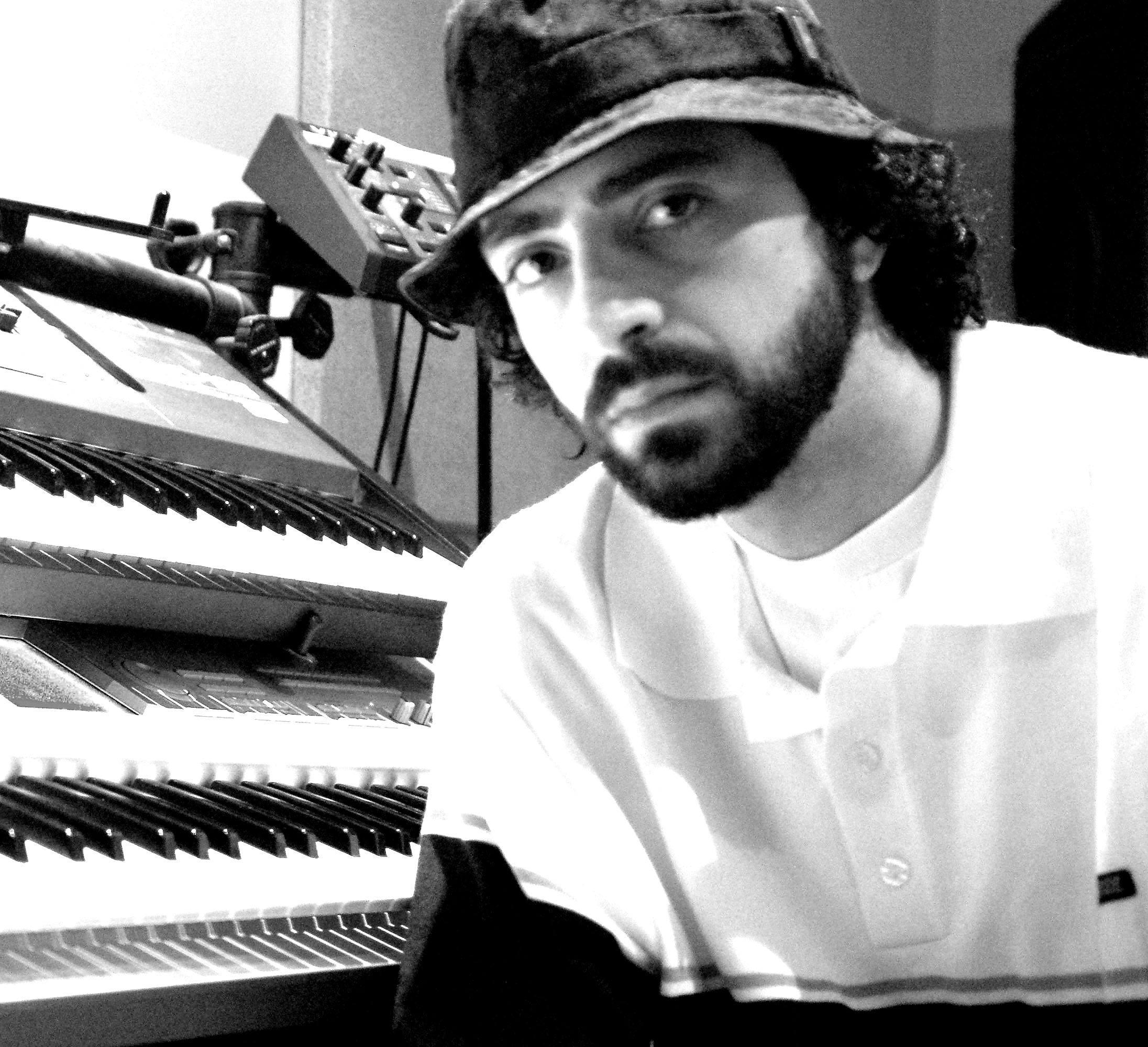

Background information
- Born: Farid Karam Nassar; June 23, 1972 (age 54); Flint, Michigan, U.S.
- Origin: Los Angeles, California, U.S.
- Genre: Hip-hop
- Occupations: Record producer; songwriter
- Years active: 1988–present
- Labels: Dogghouse Productions; Aftermath; Interscope; Death Row Records
- Member of: The ICU

Farid Karam Nassar (born June 23, 1972), better known by his stage name Fredwreck, is a Palestinian-American hip-hop music producer from Flint, Michigan.

Nassar has been a key figure in West Coast hip-hop since the early 2000s, collaborating extensively with names such as Dr. Dre, Snoop Dogg, Ice Cube, Kurupt, Eminem, and Nate Dogg. For his work on Britney Spears' Blackout, Nassar earned an MTV Europe Music Award for "Best Album".

Outside music, Nassar has been a political activist, notably starting the anti-Iraq War "STOP Movement" and promoting Palestinian human rights within hip-hop, for which he is sometimes nicknamed "Palestinian Ambassador to rappers". His vocal support for Palestine have led to both praise and controversy.

== Early life and career ==
Farid Karam Nassar was born in 1972 in Flint, Michigan to a Palestinian family. His parents emigrated to the United States in 1967 after the Six Day War. His father was born in Jerusalem and worked as a tool and die maker for AC Spark Plug, a General Motors division, while his mother is from Bir Zeit. When he was 10 years old, he and his father joined a political protest after the Sabra and Shatila massacre.

They later moved the family to San Jose, California, to open his own grocery store business. When Nassar was 11, he started breakdancing and making breakdance tapes on borrowed DJ equipment. His mother bought him a keyboard, and he made mixtapes. While in high school he worked on a reel-to-reel “mega-mix” for five straight days and sent it to the Bay Area’s hip-hop radio station 106.1 KMEL.

== Music career ==
Inspired by producers Dr. Dre, Mantronix, Marley Marl, and The Bomb Squad, Nassar began experimenting with production equipment, recording techniques, and his skills as a DJ to carve out his own sound. The influence of East Coast hip hop, West Coast hip hop, electro, soul, funk, Middle Eastern and rock music helped give him a signature sound. From 1995 to 1997 he was hired by Bomb Squad producer Hank Shocklee as an A&R executive at MCA/Universal Records where he oversaw the recordings of artists such as Mary J. Blige, Aaliyah, Immature, Al Green, King Tee, Shai, Bobby Brown and Soundtracks such as Dangerous Minds, Tales from the Hood, and others. He has also produced for other hip-hop and pop artists such as Britney Spears, Westside Connection, Lil' Kim, Xzibit, The Game, 50 Cent, Mobb Deep, as well as non-US acts such as Dizzee Rascal, Tamer Hosny, and Karl Wolf.

After leaving MCA/Universal, Nassar decided to concentrate fully on production. He would give out his production CD to anyone that would listen, and it eventually ended up with Dr. Dre who called Nassar to come in and collaborate with him in the studio which then led to him working on the multi-platinum selling album 2001. His roommate at the time Xzibit introduced him to Soopafly, who then also passed his beat CD on to members of the Dogg Pound, Daz and Kurupt which led to his production on the Kurupt album Tha Streetz Iz a Mutha and the chance to work with Snoop Dogg. Snoop then asked Nassar to join Doggystyle Records imprint as a producer which led to production on Snoop's albums, and artists on his label such as Tha Eastsidaz.

In 2007, he partnered up with songwriter Kara DioGuardi to produce songs for pop stars Britney Spears and Hilary Duff. He received an MTV Europe Music Award for Best Album for his production on Britney's Blackout album and Kara went on to be the new judge on American Idol.

The launch of MTV Arabia in 2007 brought Nassar to his roots in the Middle East, where he co-hosted Hip HopNa (Arabic for Our Hip Hop), a hip hop talent search across the Middle East with Saudi Arabian rapper Qusai. The first season led to the discovery of Arab rappers such as Omar Boflot, Desert Heat, Asfalt, Malikah and others. The program reached 180 million viewers and is the first such program of its kind. In 2009, Nassar hosted a weekly Arabic Hip Hop Show called Beit el Hip Hop (Arabic for The House of Hip Hop) with Qusai again.

In the fall of 2016, VH1 premiered a new show with Snoop Dogg, Martha Stewart and Nassar called Martha & Snoop's Potluck Dinner Party, featuring games, recipes, and musical guests. Nassar, Snoop & Martha later starred together in commercials for 7up and Snickers. In a 2016 interview with The New York Times, Martha called Fred "Her new best friend".

== Gumball 3000 ==
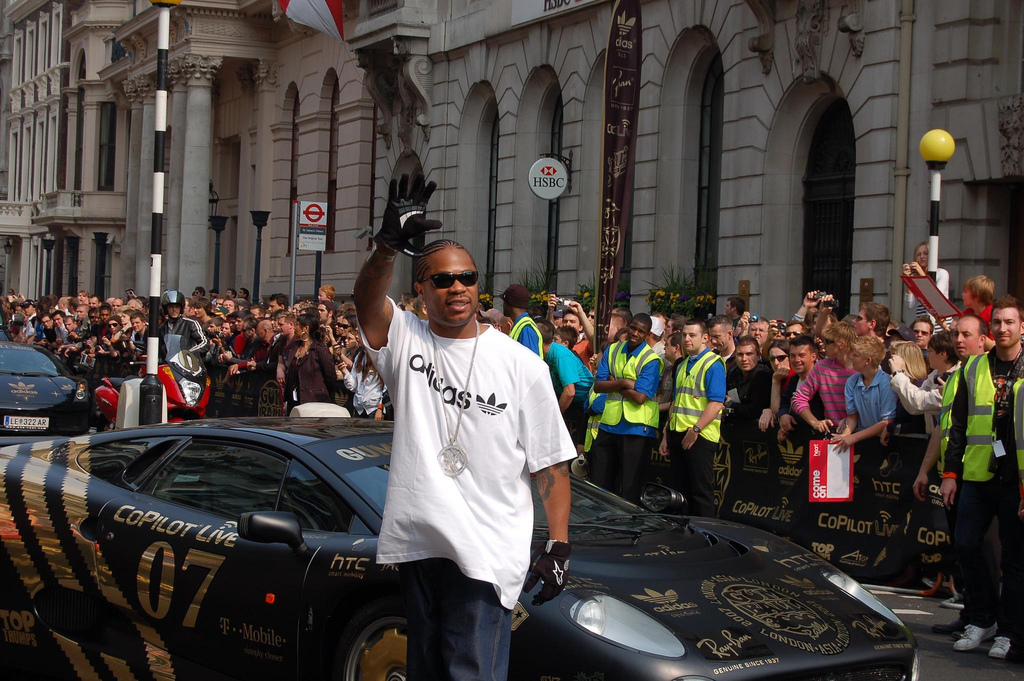
Xzibit at the Gumball 3000 rally in London, 2007

In the Gumball 3000 2007 rally, Nassar and Xzibit drove a black Lamborghini Gallardo. During the first day of the rally, Dutch police seized Xzibits driver's license for doing 160 km/h where only 100 km/h was allowed. After the penalty, Nassar took over the wheel and they were allowed to continue. In an interview with Dutch radio personality Reinout 'Q-Bah' van Gendt, Xzibit says that he mistook the kilometers for miles. Ultimately he never got his license back from the Dutch Police and had to apply for a new one in the United States.

== Political activism ==
On April 19, 2003, Nassar started the STOP Movement (Stop The Oppressive Politics). It was created to inform the world about the Iraq War. To reach more people, Nassar produced a series of songs with multiple artists including Everlast, Tray Deee. Defari, J-Ro, RBX, Daz Dillinger, Soopafly, Bad Azz, WC, Dilated Peoples, The Mac Minister, Mack 10, Evidence, Cypress Hill, the Alchemist, Mobb Deep and others.

"Down with us" is the first song in the STOP Movement. It is also the anthem for this anti-war movement. It was released on April 28, 2003. Produced by Nassar, it features Everlast, Tray Deee, Defari, Daz, J-Ro, RBX, Soopafly, Bad Azz, WC, Dilated Peoples, and Mac Minister. "Dear Mr. President" is the second STOP Movement song. It was released as a digital download on Nassar 's official site. Also produced by Nassar, it features Everlast, Mobb Deep, the Alchemist, Mack 10, WC, Evidence, Defari, KRS-One, and B-Real.

== Personal life ==
Nassar got his nickname "Fredwreck" from his friend Joe Quixx, who one day said to him while DJing: "Yo Fred, you wrecked it man, Fred-wreck." After that event, everyone started calling him Fredwreck.

== Discography ==
- 2002 (Tha Dogg Pound album)
- Blacc Balled
- Blackout (Britney Spears album)
- Blood Money (Mobb Deep album)
- Tha Blue Carpet Treatment
- Bones (soundtrack)
- Casablanco
- Cheers (Obie Trice album)
- Dignity (album)
- The Documentary 2.5
- Tha Dogg Pound Gangsta LP
- Doggumentary
- DPGC: U Know What I'm Throwin' Up
- Duces 'n Trayz: The Old Fashioned Way
- Eat at Whitey's
- Everythang's Corrupt
- Gemini: Good vs. Evil
- The General's List
- Get Rich or Die Tryin' (soundtrack)
- Ghetto Postage
- Ghetto Therapy
- Goodfellas (504 Boyz album)
- Greatest Hits from the Bong
- Guerilla City
- The Hard Way (213 album)
- Held Up (soundtrack)
- Hustla's Handbook
- I Wanna Thank Me
- The King & I (Faith Evans and The Notorious B.I.G. album)
- The Kingdom Come
- L.A. Confidential presents: Knoc-turn'al
- Malibu's Most Wanted (soundtrack)
- Missionary (album)
- Music & Me (Nate Dogg album)
- Music of Grand Theft Auto V
- Nate Dogg (album)
- The Naked Truth (Lil' Kim album)
- Next Friday (soundtrack)
- Oxnard (album)
- Paid tha Cost to Be da Boss
- Personal Business (album)
- Pleezbaleevit!
- Rap Life
- Restless (Xzibit album)
- Revenge of the Barracuda
- Revival (Eminem album)
- Music to Be Murdered By
- Rhapsody (Mr. Mike album)
- The Rebirth of Marvin
- Searching for Jerry Garcia
- Section 8 (album)
- The Sneak Attack
- Snoop Dogg Presents... Doggy Style Allstars Vol. 1
- Soft White
- Space Boogie: Smoke Oddessey
- Stash (EP)
- Still Up in This Shit!
- Super Saucy
- The Substitute (soundtrack)
- The Death of Slim Shady (Coup de Grâce)
- Ventura (Anderson .Paak album)
- Terrorist Threats
- Tha Streetz Iz a Mutha
- Till Death Do Us Part (Cypress Hill album)
- Ventilation: Da LP
- Wake Up & Ball
- When Hell.A. Freezes Over
- When We Wuz Bangin' 1989–1999: The Hitz
- Who Ride wit Us: Tha Compalation, Vol. 1
- Who Ride wit Us: Tha Compalation, Vol. 2
