= Jonny Z =

American rapper and hip-hop producer

Jonny Z is an American hip hop artist and producer.

== Career ==
Jonny Z first began working with producer Doug Rasheed in the mid-1990s. He scored his first hit when "Shake Shake (Shake Your Culo)" reached #38 on the U.S. Billboard Hot Dance Music chart.

In 1996 he released "Latin Swing" which peaked at #43 on the Billboard Hot Dance Music Chart.

His debut album, Jonny Z, was released in December 1996. It featured "No Senor (Drop Your Chones)", which reached #38 on the Billboard Hot Dance Singles chart, and "Mamacita", which reached #51.

He recorded a Latino version of Rodney O and Joe Cooley's "Everlasting Bass" entitled "Puro Latin Bass", featuring South Park Mexican a.k.a. SPM.

He then established his own label "One Lil Vato". His singles "Ku-Ku" and "Te La Pongo" were released by Jellybean Benitez's label, Jellybean Recordings, in 2001.

== Legacy ==
Jonny Z is considered to be a pioneer of Latin Hip-Hop, due to him being one of the first Latinos combining bass music with salsa, mambo, and regional Mexican banda. The Oxford encyclopedia of Latinos and Latinas in the United States - Volume 2 - Page 301 states: "A new style of Latina and Latino hip-hop was created in Miami and Texas by the bass rappers DJ Laz and Jonny Z, who mixed Latin styles with bass music".... Besides bass music, he also recorded some funk-influenced hip hop on his earlier albums. Among those early tracks, the Chicano anthem "Orale". He also was the first Latino American to incorporate not only Spanglish in his raps, but more explicit words and phrases. Words like "Culo" and "Nalgas", and "Chones". Phrases like "Vamos a la cama", and "Se me Paro". This opened the door of acceptability at radio stations across the U.S. He was truly the original Latin rap rebel.
Jonny Z's records continue to be aired frequently on major radio stations across the U.S. including KBBT San Antonio, and KYLD San Francisco.

Boogie Down Productions' 1988 remix of "I'm Still #1," which features horn samples from Tito Puente's "Jumpin' with Symphony Sid"

== Discography ==
- Jonny Z (1996) Pump Records/Quality Records
- Sancho Villa (1999) One Lil Vato Records
- Z 1 N Only (1998) Pump Records
- Bass Balla (2000) Thump Records
- El Catrin (2000) Thump Records
- Hits and More (2000)
- Greatest Hits (2000)
- Barrio Knights (2003)

== Billboard Charts ==
Single	Chart	Peak Position
Shake Shake	U.S. Billboard Hot Dance Music/Maxi -Single Sales	38
Latin Swing	U.S. Billboard Hot Dance Music/Maxi -Single Sales	42
No Senor	U.S. Billboard Hot Dance Music/Maxi -Single Sales	38
Mamacita	U.S. Billboard Hot Dance Music/Maxi -Single Sales	51

Year	Title	Chart Positions
Year	Title	Billboard Hot 100
1996	"Latin Swing "	103
1996	"No Senor"	102
1993	"Shake Shake"	-
1997	"Mamacita"	-
