= The Baka Boyz =

American radio personalities and music producers

The Baka Boyz, brothers Nick and Eric Vidal, are American radio personalities, music producers and remixers, originally from Bakersfield, California. Baka is short for Bakersfield, a Central California city 100 miles (160 km) north of Los Angeles.

The duo host a weekday syndicated morning radio show based at classic hip-hop stations KDAY and KDEY-FM 93.5 FM in the Los Angeles market. They first achieved fame on long-time hip-hop-rhythmic contemporary radio station KPWR Power 106 FM in Los Angeles.

== Background ==
The Baka Boyz were originally DJs in Bakersfield, before moving south to Los Angeles. They first began at Power 106 in 1992 with their show creation, "Friday Nite Flavas". They also developed Power's live mixing "World Famous Roll Call".

Their popularity prompted the station to give them the morning drive time show, which earned high ratings. and afternoon. They hosted wake-ups at Power 106 for seven years. But the duo grew disaffected with Power's move to a more R&B sound, at the expense of hip-hop. So they resigned from KPWR.

Shortly after leaving Power 106 in 1999, the duo briefly had an afternoon show on rival rhythmic contemporary station 100.3 KKBT. Later, they decided to move north to long-time rhythmic 106.1 KMEL in San Francisco.

They are hosts of the nationally syndicated "Hip Hop Master Mix", broadcast on over fifty stations in the U.S. Finally, the Baka Boyz acted as talent scouts, discovering future LA radio star Big Boy, Dj Eman and Tito among others. In addition, they have also produced tracks for various artists. They produced and co-wrote the track "Scandalous" by Psycho Realm on the 1994 Mi Vida Loca original motion picture soundtrack, "Pistol Grip Pump" by Project Blowed rapper Volume 10, and other tracks.

The Vidals relocated to WMIB The Beat 103.5 in Miami in March 2003 as the station's morning hosts. But by 2005 The Baka Boyz returned to Los Angeles to do afternoon hosting at 93.5 KDAY. They were there until May 2007, when the Baka Boyz moved to Blazin' 98.9 in San Diego to do their morning show there. The Duo left the station in 2008 and continues to focus on their weekly syndicated Hip-Hop mix show "The Baka Boyz Master Mix."

The Baka Boyz returned to Los Angeles in 2017 and started "Live From Cybertron" on Dash Radio. "Live From Cybertron" was a daily three-hour show which was heard on Dash Radio. Live from Cyberton had guests from the EDM scene along with Hip Hop acts. This show gave birth to "The Most Interesting Mix In The World."

After "Live From Cybertron" ended in 2018, The Baka Boyz moved to weekday morning show format on Dash Radio's "The City." The morning show saw all kinds of guest stop by, keeping the theme that "Live From Cyberton" had, but also inviting people from Hollywood. The Baka Boyz Morning show on The City was streamed on YouTube, Facebook, and Twitch for one year before the morning show went on a hiatus.

Currently, The Baka Boyz have made their return to Los Angeles FM radio, heard weekday mornings on 93.5 KDAY and KDEY-FM. The "Hip-Hop Master Mix" is heard every Friday from 9 p.m. to midnight PST.
