= Gerardo (musician) =

Ecuadorian rapper (born 1965)

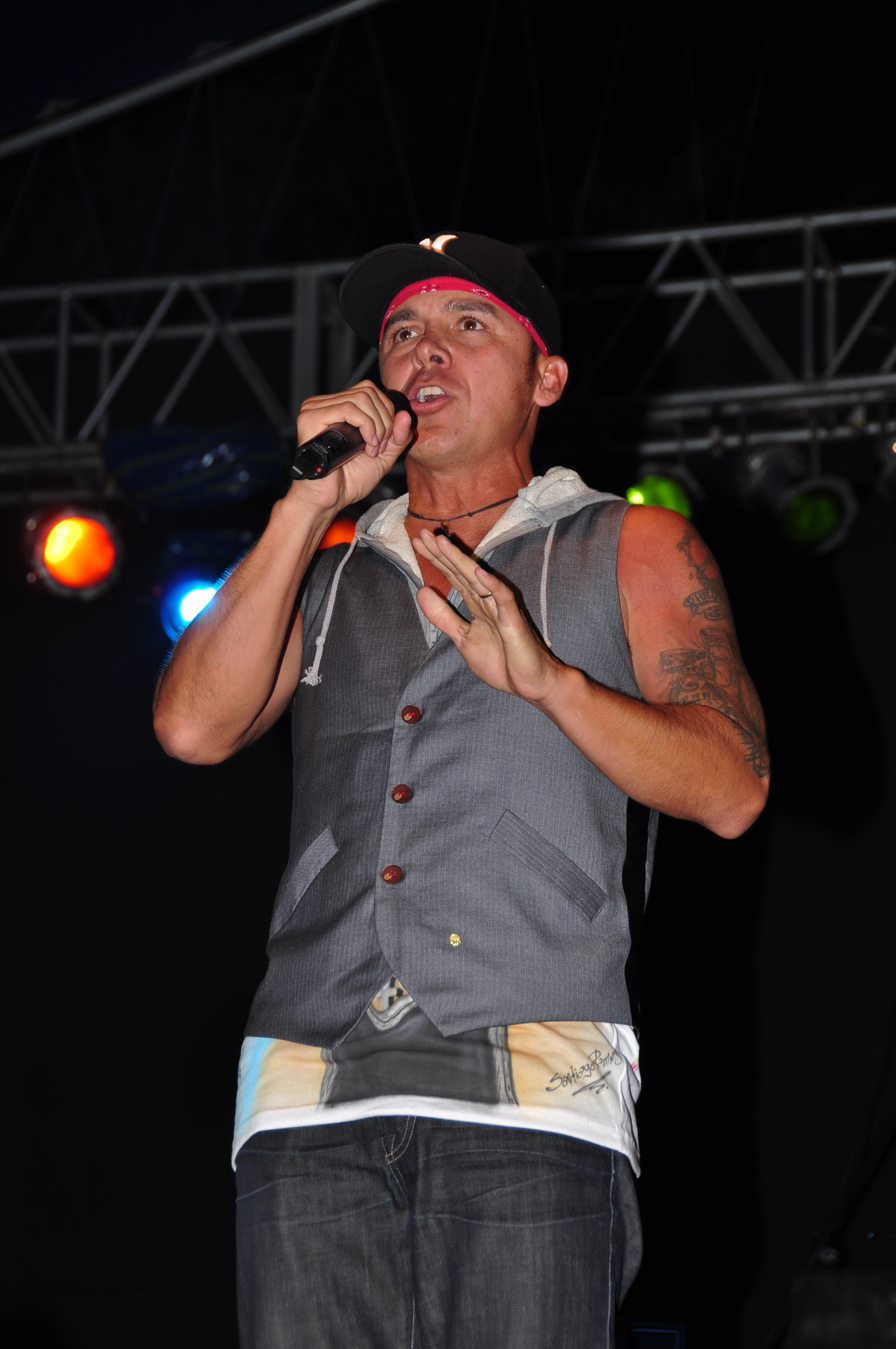
- Mejía in 2010

Background information
- Born: Gerardo Ernesto Mejía Aguilera; April 16, 1965 (age 61); Guayaquil, Ecuador
- Genres: Pop; hip hop
- Occupations: Singer; rapper; actor; pastor
- Years active: 1987–present
- Labels: Interscope Records (1990–1993); Randy's Records (1991–1992)

Gerardo Mejía Aguilera (Note: In this name that follows Hispanic American naming customs, the first or paternal surname is Mejía and the second or maternal family name is Aguilera.) (born April 16, 1965), better known by his mononym Gerardo, is an Ecuadorian-born American singer, rapper and actor. He gained wide visibility with his 1990 hit single "Rico Suave", and later became a recording industry executive and a Christian pastor.

== Personal life ==
Mejía is married to Kathy Eicher, a former pageant titleholder who was Miss West Virginia USA 1989. They have three children: Nadia, Bianca, and Jaden. Nadia is a model who competed in pageants like her mother, and won the title of Miss Universe Ecuador 2025 and Miss California USA 2016. They have a granddaughter, Lily, and live in Kentucky.

== Discography ==
=== Albums ===
- Mo' Ritmo (1991)
- Dos (1992)
- Asi Es (1994)
- Derrumbe (1995)
- Gerardo (2001)
- 180° (2004)

=== Singles ===
Year	Song	US Hot 100	Album
1991	"Rico Suave"	7	Mo' Ritmo
1991	"We Want The Funk"	16	Mo' Ritmo
1991	"When The Lights Go Out"	98	Mo' Ritmo
1991	"Latin Till I Die" (Japan Only)	—	Mo' Ritmo
1992	"Here Kitty Kitty"	—	Dos
1992	"Love"	—	Dos
1994	"Arroz Con Carne"	—	Así Es
1994	"María Elisa"	—	Así Es
1995	"¿Qué Es Lo Que Pasa Aquí?"	—	Derrumbe
1995	"Derrumbe"	—	Derrumbe
1997	"All The Ladies In The House"	—	single only

== Filmography ==
Year	Film/Television	Role	Notes
1984	Hot Moves	Break Dancer	
1987	Can't Buy Me Love	Ricky	
1987	Winners Take All	Johnny Rivera	
1988	Colors	Bird	
1988	Supercarrier	Luis Cruz	8 episodes
1988	Santa Barbara	Ramon Fonseca	3 episodes
1989	21 Jump Street	Lopez	Episode: "Loc'd Out: Part 1"
1989	Sundown: The Vampire in Retreat	Pucci	
1994	A Million to Juan	Flaco	
1994	Somebody to Love	Armando	
2002	100 Greatest One-Hit Wonders	self	VH-1 series
2003	Pauly Shore Is Dead	Rico Suave	
2003	Mi Casa, Su Casa	Miguel Sanchez	Alternate title; Loco Love
2014	Suave Says	Himself	TV series
