= Thump Records =

American record label

- Founded: 1990
- Founder: Bill Walker and Al Lopez

Thump Records is an American record label founded by Bill Walker and Al Lopez in 1990.

== History ==
Thump's success was ignited by the popularity of its Old School and Low Rider compilation series (co-branded with Low Rider Magazine). Universal Music Group serves as the distributor for Thump, which has also brought on board a variety of artists under its own label.

Tierra gained hit The Intruders' 1967 song "Together", written by Gamble & Huff, which reached #18 on the Billboard Hot 100 from Boardwalk Records, and later Tierra joined Thump Records. Tierra and Rocky Paddila were top stars of Thump Records. Thump released Low Rider Series, Oldies Series, Old Skool Series and East Side Story Series.

== Artists on Thump Records ==
Present and past...

- 3AM
- Ant Banks
- Bizzy Bone
- Brown Boy (musician)
- Candy Man
- C-Note
- Bootsy Collins
- Daphee (singer) "I Like My Hair Like This"
- DJ King Assassin
- Domino
- Don Cisco
- El Chicano
- Frenchi Armelle
- Frenchy Valens
- Full Force
- Hispanic MC's
- Ronnie Hudson
- Jonny Z
- J.V.
- Katalina
- Knightowl (Mr. Knightowl)
- Kid Frost
- Lighter Shade of Brown
- Lil' Cuete
- Lio Rush (musician)
- Lonzo (Alonzo Williams)
- Lucci Vee
- MC Magic
- Mildred Black
- Mr. Capone-E
- Mr. Patron
- Ms. Vee
- Namek (musician)
- Nate Dogg
- Paperboy
- Ralfi Pagan
- Rocky Padilla
- Peaches & Herb
- Walter Ray
- Sky Tower Click
- Slow Pain
- Stacey Q
- Wendy Starland
- Suave MC & Baby G
- Sugar Style
- Tierra
- Tommy Gunn
- Twenty 3 Wayz
- World Class Wreckin' Cru
- Vixen ent
- Zapp Band

== See also ==
- List of record labels
- Aztec-Rock
- Brown-eyed soul
- Latin Rap Cruisin' USA - MX Rapperos/Angelic, Lady Of Mercy, Love God, Angelic/Miguel Hernandez, Viramontes - D.O.B: Wednesday June 11, 1980
- W-Funk
- Santana
- Urban Kings Music Group - Azteca World/Brown Prider, Miguel Hernandez, Viramontes
