= Latin hip-hop =

Hip-hop music by Latin American artists

- Stylistic origins: hip-hop; Latin music
- Cultural origins: 1970s, The Bronx, New York City, U.S.
- Typical instruments: Turntable; synthesizer; DAW; rapping; singing; drum machine; sampler; drums; guitar; Roland TR-808; bass guitar; piano; beatboxing; vocals

Subgenres
- Latin trap; Spanish hip hop; Salvadoran hip hop; Brazilian hip hop; Mexican hip hop; Merenrap; Dominican hip hop; Cuban hip hop; Chicano rap; Puerto Rican hip hop

Fusion genres
- corridos tumbados

Latin hip-hop (also known as Latin rap) is a subgenre of hip-hop music that is recorded by Spanish-speaking artists in North America, South America, and Spain.

== Latin hip-hop in the United States ==
=== West Coast ===
In the late 1980s and early 1990s, most Latin rap came from New York and the West Coast of the United States. Due to the heaviest Puerto Rican migration to New York City in the '50s, during the '70s, the birth of Latin Hip-Hop involved Hispanic from the Caribbean island. Early hip-hop from the United States had a significant influence on early Puerto Rican hip-hop pioneers such as Ruben DJ, DJ Negro, and Vico-C.

Mellow Man Ace, from Cuba, was the first Hispanic artist to have a major bilingual single, the 1989 track "Mentirosa". This song went platinum, leading Mellow Man Ace to be described as the "Godfather of Latin rap" and inducted into the Hip-Hop Hall of Fame inductee. In 1990, fellow West Coast artist Kid Frost further brought Hispanics to the rap forefront with his hit song "La Raza". In 1991, Kid Frost, Mellow Man, A.L.T. and several other Latin rappers formed the rap super group Latin Alliance and released a self-titled album which featured the hit "Lowrider (On the Boulevard)". The remake of the song Tequila was an A.L.T. hit later that year. Cypress Hill, of which Mellow Man Ace was a member before going solo, would become the first Hispanic rap group to reach platinum status in 1991. The group was also the first major hip-hop music group to include Spanish and Latin slang in their lyrics. Cypress Hill gained hit "Insane in the Brain"(1993) and Platinum record. Ecuadorian-born American rapper Gerardo received heavy rotation on video and radio for his single Rico Suave. While commercially watered-down, his album enjoyed a status of being one of the first mainstream Spanglish CDs on the market. Johnny J was a multi-platinum songwriter, music producer, and rapper who was perhaps best known for his production on Tupac Shakur's albums All Eyez on Me and Me Against the World. He also produced the 1990 single Knockin' Boots for his classmate Candyman's album Ain't No Shame in My Game, which eventually went platinum thanks to the single. N2Deep, A Lighter Shade of Brown, Proper Dos, and Slow Pain were popular in Latin rap scene.

In the mid-1990s, the success of LA's Cypress Hill led to additional Latin hip-hop artists finding label support. Delinquent Habits were a horn-sampling trio that found MTV support for their breakout bilingual single "Tres Delinquentes" in 1996. By the early 2000s, two Mexico-born, United States-raised Latin hip-hop acts found success on major labels. LA's Akwid fused banda with hip-hop on hits like "No Hay Manera" while Milwaukee's Kinto Sol told tales of Mexican immigrant life over more minimalist beats. Mr.Criminal, Mr.Capone-E, Mr.Knightowl, Ms.Krazie, Charlie Row Campo and Mr.Sancho released Latin and Chicano rap CDs.

=== East Coast ===
DJ Charlie Chase fused hip-hop with salsa and other music genres. Chase was the DJ for the New York hip-hop group the Cold Crush Brothers, from 1978 and through the '80s. East Coast Latin artists such as the Beatnuts emerged in the early 1990s, with New Jersey native Chino XL earning recognition for his lyricism and equal controversy for his subject matter. In 1992, Mesanjarz of Funk, led by the Spanish/English flow of Mr. Pearl, became the first Spanish rap group signed to a major label (Atlantic Records). In 1994, Platinum Producer and DJ Frankie Cutlass used his own label, Hoody Records, to produce his single “Puerto Rico” which became a classic. In the late 1990s, Puerto Rican rapper Big Punisher became the first Hispanic solo artist to reach platinum sales for an LP with his debut album Capital Punishment, which included hit song "Still Not a Player". The genre even spawned a bicultural novelty, the Brooklyn-based crew Hip Hop Hoodíos, who fused their dual Jewish and Hispanic cultures on songs like "Havana Nagila" and "Raza Hoodía".

=== South and Midwest ===
Latin rap (as well as its subgenre of Chicano rap) has thrived along the Western, Southern and Midwestern states with little promotion due to the large Latino populations of those regions. Jonny Z is considered to be a pioneer of Latin hip-hop, due to him being one of the first Hispanic combining Spanglish lyrics with freestyle, salsa, mambo, and regional Mexican banda. He scored four Billboard Hot Dance singles between 1993 and 1997, including one of the greatest Miami bass songs of all time, "Shake Shake (Shake That Culo)". Besides bass music, he also recorded the Chicano anthem "Orale". The Oxford Encyclopedia of Latinos and Latinas in the United States Volume 2, Page 301 states: "A new style of Latina and Latino hip-hop was created in Miami and Texas by the bass rappers DJ Laz and Jonny Z, who mixed Latin styles with bass music".

== Puerto Rico ==
Urbano Music from Puerto Rico has had an impact on Latin rap and relates a certain message to their respective audiences. Puerto Rican underground rap (referred to in Puerto Rico 'underground' with Reggaeton) emerged as a form of cultural and social protest within the Puerto Rican context. This is similar to the way American and Jamaican youth used rap and reggae as a means to communicate their feelings on social, cultural, and political issues. In essence, Puerto Rican rap became the voice of the Puerto Rican youth in which they use dancehall and rap music as methods of expression for the Jamaican and working-class American youth counterparts.

=== Latin trap ===
In the mid-2010s, A new movement of Urbano music referred to as Latin Trap (or "Trap Latino" in Spanish) began to emerge, led by the Puerto Rican rapper Anuel AA. This musical movement was different from American trap, being influenced not only by Southern hip-hop, but also by Urbano music, R&B, pop, and reggaeton. The trap music movement brought artists like Bad Bunny to the mainstream who became the first non-English speaking rapper to become the most streamed artist of the year on Spotify, three consecutive times between 2020 and 2022, and also has the title of having the most streamed album on Spotify with his album Un Verano Sin Ti (2022).

Also known as "Trap Latino", Latin trap similar to mainstream trap which details "'la calle,' or the streets — hustling, sex, and drugs". Prominent artists of Latin trap include Arcángel, Bryant Myers, Anuel AA and Bad Bunny. In July 2017, The Fader wrote "Rappers and reggaetoneros from Puerto Rico to Colombia have taken elements of trap — the lurching bass lines, jittering 808s and the eyes-half-closed vibe — and infused them into banger after banger." In an August 2017 article for Billboard's series, "A Brief History Of", they enlisted some of the key artists of Latin trap—including Ozuna, De La Ghetto, Bad Bunny, Farruko and Bryant Myers—to narrate a brief history on the genre. Elias Leight of Rolling Stone noted "[Jorge] Fonseca featured Puerto Rican artists like Anuel AA, Bryant Myers and Noriel on the compilation Trap Capos: Season 1, which became the first "Latin trap" LP to reach Number One on Billboard's Latin Rhythm Albums chart."

In addition, Venezuelan hip-hop has emerged in an important way with talented artists such as Neutro Shorty and Big Soto

=== Puerto Rican hip-hop ===
In the early 1980s as hip-hop was becoming popular in the United States with groups like Run-DMC and the Sugarhill Gang, a young rapper in Puerto Rico would be inspired by rap from the United States under the pseudonym "Vico C". Vico C would go on and produce underground hip-hop mixtapes which would become very popular in the San Juan metropolitan area, inspiring artists at the time like Ruben DJ, Brewley MC, Lisa M, and Def J. Le Fresh. As Reggaeton started becoming a much more popular as a more "danceable" rhythm compatible to the Caribbean, Puerto Rican hip-hop became a niche underground movement in Puerto Rico. In the late 90s there was an attempt to reinvigorate the hip-hop movement in Puerto Rico by a group called "No Mel Syndicate". While the hip-hop movement continues to be locally underground, modern artists such as Siete Nueve, MC Ceja, and PJ Sin Suela continue to produce hip-hop in Puerto Rico.

== Latin hip-hop in other countries ==
=== Mexico ===
In the late 1990s, hip-hop took hold in Mexico, especially with the platinum success of Mexican rap pioneers Control Machete. The genre also found prominence with Latin alternative artists who fused hip-hop rhymes with live instrumentation, including rap-rockers Molotov and cumbia-rockers El Gran Silencio.

==== Narco rap ====
A music scene, similar to the early underground gangsta rap scene, has emerged in northeastern Mexico (Nuevo León, Tamaulipas and Coahuila), where the musical phenomenon of hip-hop is being co-opted by the influence of organized crime and the drug war in the region.

Some of the main exponents of the genre are Cano y Blunt, DemenT and Big Los.

=== Argentina and Uruguay ===
There are many hip-hop scenes in Latin America, including a growing rap movement in Buenos Aires and Montevideo.

Hip-hop in Uruguay has had a significant presence since the late 1990s, with groups such as Sudacas en Guerra, Oeste Pro Funk, Plátano Macho and El Peyote Asesino. Starting in 2003, the genre began to develop progressively in the country, especially after latejapride* joined Bizarro Records. Since then, numerous groups and artists have emerged on the Uruguayan hip-hop scene, including Beat Urbano, Arrajatabla Flow Club & The Warriors, Magia Negra Squad, Primate and Cubaguayo, among others.

Introduction: Since the late 1990s, Uruguay has witnessed the development of a thriving hip-hop scene, marked by the contributions of early pioneers and a variety of influential groups. 2003 Onwards: A significant turning point was latejapride*'s signing with Bizarro Records, which led to a progressive development of the genre. New Artists and Challenges: The emergence of acts like Beat Urbano, Arrajatabla Flow Club & The Warriors, and Magia Negra Squad, as well as the challenges faced, including the tragic murder of rapper Plef, illustrate the scene's evolution and resilience. Conclusion Each of these countries' hip-hop scenes reflects their unique cultural contexts and social issues. While facing distinct challenges, these communities continue to use hip-hop as a powerful tool for expression and social commentary. Uruguayan Hip-Hop Development: New Rappers such as 44 Kid, Zanto, Davus, Mesita, and Rodridi recorded rap singles or albums.

== Freestyle ==
In the mid-1980s, freestyle music was initially called "Latin hip-hop". This dance music genre, not to be confused with improvised freestyle rapping, was dominated, at the time, by electro funk beats and electronic Latin melodic and percussion elements, over which Latino vocalists sang melodramatic pop vocals, usually in English even though it was started by Nuyorican natives and African-Americans primarily. Freestyle has been primarily popular among Hispanics in the New York City, Miami, Chicago and California club scenes, but achieved national mainstream pop success with hits by Lisa Lisa, the Cover Girls, George Lamond, Stevie B, TKA and Exposé, among others.

== See also ==
- Avanzada Regia
- Brazilian hip-hop
- Chicano rap
- Corridos tumbados
- Cuban hip-hop
- Dominican hip-hop
- Merenrap
- Mexican hip-hop
- Nuyorican rap
- Reggaeton
- Uruguayan hip-hop
- Salvadoran hip-hop
- Spanish hip-hop
- Thump Records
- Puerto Rican hip-hop
- Mayan hip-hop music
