= Frost (rapper) =

American rapper

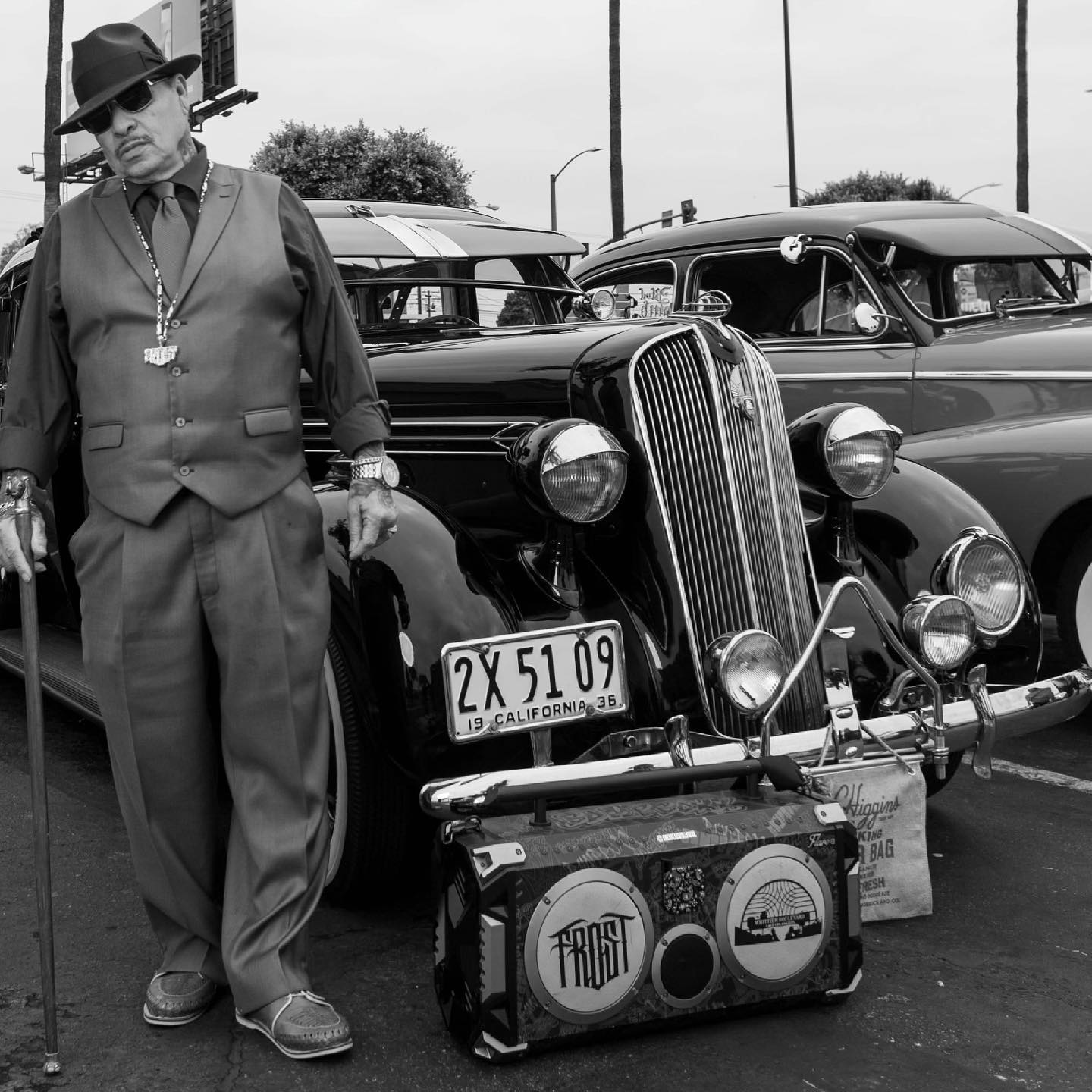

Background information
- Also known as: Kid Frost (former); OG Kid Frost; Uncle Frost
- Born: Arturo R. Molina Jr. May 31, 1964 (age 62); Windsor, California, U.S.
- Origin: East Los Angeles, California, U.S.
- Genres: Latin hip hop; chicano rap; classic hip hop; golden age hip hop; alternative hip hop; West Coast hip hop; hardcore hip hop; gangsta rap; mafioso rap
- Occupations: Rapper; songwriter; record producer; breakdancer (former)
- Works: Frost discography
- Years active: 1982-present
- Labels: Virgin; Ruthless; Old West Entertainment; Relativity; Koch Entertainment; Celeb Entertainment; Hit A Lick Records
- Formerly of: Uncle Jamm's Army; Latin Alliance; Latino Velvet

Arturo R. Molina Jr. (born May 31, 1964), better known as Frost (originally Kid Frost), is an American rapper, songwriter and record producer. He charted in the 1990s with his first four albums: Hispanic Causing Panic, East Side Story, Smile Now, Die Later and When Hell.A. Freezes Over. His most successful single is "La Raza" which hit number 6 on the rap songs chart in August 1990. His 1990 debut album is credited as the first Latin hip-hop album.

Frost's music entered the Billboard 200 again in 2002 with the album Still Up in This Shit!. He is the father of record producer Scoop DeVille.

== Early life, family and education ==
Molina was born and in Windsor, California but raised in Germany and East Los Angeles. Because his father was in the military he grew up on bases in Guam and Germany. He is of Mexican descent.

== Career ==
He began his music career in 1982 as Kid Frost as a tribute to his rival Ice-T, whom he often battled in the music industry. In an interview Frost stated that his first actual DJ was in fact Dr. Dre and DJ Yella. He soon became a breakdancer for Uncle Jamms Army.

In the mid-1980s, Frost released several pre-gangsta 12" singles on Los Angeles-based labels Electrobeat and Baja. In the late 1980s, Kid Frost moved to Virgin Records. His biggest hit, "La Raza", from his debut album Hispanic Causing Panic (1990), combined East L.A. elements and became an "East L.A. anthem." Hispanic Causing Panic is credited as the first Chicano rap album, and brought attention to Latin rappers on the West Coast.

Frost also established the Latin rap supergroup Latin Alliance, which released their only album, Latin Alliance, in 1991. His second album, East Side Story was released in 1992.

In 1995, Frost dropped the "Kid" from his nickname and signed with Ruthless Records, Eazy-E's label (distributed by Relativity). Smile Now, Die Later was released that year. Above The Law were featured as guest rappers, alongside A.L.T., O.G.Enius and Kokane. Rick James also appeared on Frost's version of "Mary Jane". His second album for Ruthless, When Hell.A.Freezes Over, was released in 1997. Ice-T, Scoop, O.G.Enius and Domino also appeared as guest rappers. In 1998, Frost collaborated with South Park Mexican in "El Jugador" music video along with Low-G released by Dope House Records in the Power Moves: The Table album. Frost was also featured in the songs: Cali-Tex Connect, and West Coast, Gulf Coast, East Coast also from the Power Moves: The Table album.

In 1999, Frost moved to a small independent label, Celeb Entertainment Inc. His first album for Celeb Entertainment This Was Then This Is Now Vol. I was released in 1999. Kurupt, King T, Baby Bash, Jay Tee, Jayo Felony, Xzibit, B-Legit and Cameo were featured on the CD. That Was Then This Is Now Vol. II was released in 2000. Frank V., Clika One, Jay Tee, Baby Bash and other guest rappers were also featured on the CD.

2002's Still Up In This Shit!, released by Hit-A-Lick and Koch Records, featured more Latin rap style and g-funk tracks as well as a hidden bonus rock track, "Cannabis". Mellow Man Ace, Daz Dillinger, Baby Bash, A.L.T., Nino Brown, Don Cisco and other guest rappers appeared, and one track featured the group Tierra.

In 2004 Welcome to Frost Angeles was released on Thump Records, which was produced almost entirely by Frost and his son Scoop DeVille. Only the Intro is produced by Binky Womack, and Philly Blunt co-produced one track. Guest rappers included Cameosis, Genovese and Jay Tee. Frost again signed to Low Profile Records and released his album Till The Wheels Fall Off in 2006. It had various guest appearances which included Baby Bash, Scoop DeVille and Mr. Sancho.

Frost also performed music for films including "Bite the Bullet (Theme from Gunmen)" in the 1993 film Gunmen and "Tears Of A Mother" in the film No Mothers Crying, No Babies Dying, which featured Ice-T.

Frost is also an actor, having his feature film debut in the movie Platinum Illusions. He also portrayed of fictional character T-Bone Mendez from Grand Theft Auto: San Andreas and contributed his song "La Raza" to the soundtrack.

He was named vice president of the Music Division of Goldmark Industries on August 30, 2006. Frost also appeared in a cameo role in Snoop Dogg's "Vato" music video. In 2009 Frost collaborated with Serio on the song "In LA" from the album N.T.I.R. Part 2 The Revenge of Serio. He was also featured on the "Frost and Serio Skit" on the album. In 2010 Frost appeared in the film "The Rise Of Serio".

In 2016, Frost announced that he had been diagnosed with gallbladder cancer.

== Discography ==
=== Studio albums ===
- Hispanic Causing Panic (1990)
- East Side Story (1992)
- Smile Now, Die Later (1995)
- When Hell.A. Freezes Over (1997)
- That Was Then, This Is Now, Vol. 1 (1999)
- That Was Then, This Is Now, Vol. 2 (2000)
- Still Up in This Shit! (2002)
- Welcome to Frost Angeles (2004)
- Till the Wheels Fall Off (2006)
- All Oldies (2011)
- All Oldies II (2012)
- Old School Funk (2013)
- The Good Man (2013)

=== Collaboration albums ===
- Latin Alliance with Latin Alliance (1991)
- Velvet City with Latino Velvet (2000)
