= A.L.T. =

American rapper

- Born: Alvin Lowell Trivette; May 17, 1970 (age 56); Los Angeles County, California, U.S.
- Origin: El Monte, California, U.S.
- Genre: Chicano rap
- Years active: 1989–present
- Labels: Atlantic; East West; Ruthless
- Formerly of: Latin Alliance

Alvin Lowell Trivette (born May 17, 1970), known as A.L.T., is an American rapper. known for the 1991 hit "Lowrider (On the Boulevard)" (as a member of Latin Alliance) and the 1992 hit "Tequila" (No. 48 on the Billboard Hot 100).

== Biography ==
Trivette is of Mexican and French descent. He joined the rap in which was supergroup Latin Alliance in 1991. After their first and only album, he went solo and released his debut album, Another Latin Timebomb in 1992, under the name A.L.T. & the Lost Civilization. The following year, he put out his second album, Stone Cold World.

In the movie Blast Trap, his song "Refried Beans" is heard in the background during the house party scene. A.L.T. makes a cameo appearance in the film. He is shown coming out of the bathroom and saying the line, "Yo man, there ain't enough TP in the house if EVERYONE is eating dem beans!" In 1995, A.L.T. teamed up with Kid Frost again and released the hit "East Side Rendezvous", which was an international hit. A.L.T. has written lyrics for many artists including Kid Frost, HWA, and Eazy-E. His music has appeared in many movies and television such as Touched by an Angel (CBS), The Real World (MTV) and movies like The Substitute starring Tom Berenger.

== Discography ==
=== Studio albums ===
- Another Latin Timebomb (1992)
- Stone Cold World (1993)
- 3 deep -Frost, Alt, Slow Pain, Eazy E (1994)
- The Resurrection (2010)

=== Collaboration albums ===
- Latin Alliance with Latin Alliance (1991)
- Crime Stories with G'Fellas (1999)
- Gangster 4 Life with G'Fellas (2001)
