= Compton's Most Wanted discography =

- Studio albums: 6
- Compilation albums: 1
- Singles: 5
- Music videos: 6

This is the discography of West Coast hip-hop group Compton's Most Wanted, consisting of six studio albums and one compilation album.

== Albums ==
=== Studio albums ===
List of studio albums, with selected chart positions
Title	Album details	Peak chart positions	
Title	Album details	US	US R&B
It's a Compton Thang	Released: June 19, 1990; Label: Orpheus; Formats: CD, LP, cassette	133	32
Straight Checkn 'Em	Released: July 16, 1991; Label: Orpheus, Epic; Formats: CD, LP, cassette	92	23
Music to Driveby	Released: September 29, 1992; Label: Orpheus, Epic; Formats: CD, LP, cassette	66	20
Represent	Released: October 24, 2000; Label: Half Ounce; Formats: CD, cassette	-	-
Music to Gang Bang	Released: June 13, 2006; Label: B-Dub; Formats: CD	-	-
Gangsta Bizness	Released: October 4, 2019; Label: Blue Stamp; Formats: CD	-	-

=== Compilation albums ===
List of compilation albums, with selected chart positions
Title	Album details	Peak chart positions	
Title	Album details	US	US R&B
When We Wuz Bangin' 1989–1999: The Hitz	Released: January 23, 2001; Label: The Right Stuff, Capitol; Formats: CD	-	-

== Singles ==
List of singles, with selected chart positions
Title	Year	Peak chart positions	Album
Title	Year	US Rap	Album
"One Time Gaffled 'Em Up"	1990	5	It's a Compton Thang
"I'm Wit Dat"	1990	25	It's a Compton Thang
"Growin' Up In the Hood"	1991	1	Straight Checkn 'Em
"Straight Checkn 'Em"	1991	16	Straight Checkn 'Em
"Hood Took Me Under"	1992	5	Music to Driveby
"—" denotes a recording that did not chart or was not released in that territory.

== Music videos ==
Year	Song	Director
1989	"This is Compton"	–
1990	"One Time Gaffled 'Em Up"	Joseph Sassone
1991	"Growin' Up In the Hood"	–
1991	"Straight Checkn 'Em"	–
1992	"Hood Took Me Under"	Okuwah
1992	"Def Wish II"	–
