= When We Wuz Bangin' 1989–1999: The Hitz =

When We Wuz Bangin' 1989-1999: The Hitz

Greatest hits album by Compton's Most Wanted
- Released: January 23, 2001
- Recorded: 1988–1998
- Genre: West Coast hip hop; gangsta rap; g-funk
- Length: 57:57
- Label: The Right Stuff; Capitol
- Producer: Tom Cartwright (exec.); Blackjack; DJ Slip; Fredwreck; MC Eiht; The Unknown DJ

Compton's Most Wanted chronology
Represent (2000)	When We Wuz Bangin' 1989-1999: The Hitz (2001)	Music to Gang Bang (2006)

Professional ratings
Review scores
Source	Rating
AllMusic	4.5/5 stars
RapReviews	7/10

When We Wuz Bangin' 1989–1999: The Hitz is the first greatest hits album by American hip hop group Compton's Most Wanted including solo material recorded by the group's frontman MC Eiht. It was released on January 23, 2001, via The Right Stuff/Capitol Records. Composed of thirteen tracks, it contains songs from the first three Compton's Most Wanted albums—It's a Compton Thang, Straight Checkn 'Em and Music to Driveby—, its A-side and B-sides, Menace II Society (The Original Motion Picture Soundtrack), MC Eiht featuring CMW album We Come Strapped, Spice 1's album 1990-Sick, and MC Eiht's solo album Section 8. Production was handled by DJ Slip, The Unknown DJ, Blackjack, Fredwreck and MC Eiht, with Tom Cartwright serving as executive producer. It features guest appearances from Scarface and Spice 1.

== Track listing ==
No.	Title	Writer(s)	Producer(s)	Length
1.	"One Time Gaffled 'Em Up"	Aaron Tyler; Terry Allen; Andre Manuel	DJ Slip	3:56
2.	"Duck Sick"	Tyler; Allen; Manuel	The Unknown DJ	4:30
3.	"Late Night Hype"	Tyler; Anita Baker; Patrick Moten; Sandra Sully	The Unknown DJ	4:48
4.	"Whose Is It? (Give It Up, Pt. 2)"	Tyler; Allen; Manuel	DJ Slip; The Unknown DJ	5:23
5.	"Growin' Up in the Hood"	Tyler; Allen; Manuel; Joe Simon	DJ Slip; The Unknown DJ	4:12
6.	"I'm Wit Dat"	Tyler; Allen; Manuel	The Unknown DJ	4:53
7.	"N 2 Deep" (featuring Scarface)	Tyler; Allen; Isaac Hayes	DJ Slip	3:51
8.	"Def Wish II" (DJ Premier Remix)	Tyler; Manuel; Christopher Martin	The Unknown DJ	4:12
9.	"All for the Money"	Tyler; Darryl Ellis; Paul Richmond	DJ Slip; MC Eiht	4:06
10.	"1990-Sick (Kill 'Em All)" (featuring Spice 1)	Tyler	Blackjack	4:26
11.	"Streiht Up Menace"	Tyler; Allen	DJ Slip	4:34
12.	"Automatic"	Tyler; Farid Nassar	Fredwreck	4:16
13.	"Days of '89"	Tyler; Allen	DJ Slip	4:50
Total length:				57:57

Notes

- Tracks 1, 2, 3 and 6 are taken from Compton's Most Wanted 1990 album It's a Compton Thang
- Track 4 is taken from Compton's Most Wanted 1990 single "I'm Wit Dat"
- Track 5 is taken from Compton's Most Wanted 1991 album Straight Checkn 'Em
- Track 7 is taken from Compton's Most Wanted 1992 album Music to Driveby
- Track 8 is taken from Compton's Most Wanted 1992 single "Def Wish II"
- Track 9 is taken from MC Eiht featuring CMW 1994 album We Come Strapped
- Track 10 is taken from Spice 1 1995 album 1990-Sick
- Track 11 is taken from 1993 Menace II Society (The Original Motion Picture Soundtrack)
- Tracks 12 and 13 are taken from MC Eiht 1999 album Section 8

== Personnel ==
- Aaron "MC Eiht" Tyler – vocals, producer (track 9)
- Michael "DJ Mike T" Bryant – scratches
- Terry "DJ Slip" Allen – producer (tracks: 1, 4, 5, 7, 9, 11, 13)
- Brad "Scarface" Jordan – vocals (track 7)
- Robert Lee "Spice 1" Green Jr. – vocals (track 10)
- Andre "The Unknown DJ" Manuel – producer (tracks: 2–6, 8)
- Chris "DJ Premier" Martin – re-mixing (track 8)
- Gentry "Black Jack" Reed – producer (track 10)
- Farid "Fredwreck" Nassar – producer (track 12)
- Marc Rustigian – mastering
- Tom Cartwright – executive producer
- Marlene Bergman – design
- Peter Dokus – photography
- Phyllis Pollack – liner notes
