= Hood Took Me Under =

Single by Compton's Most Wanted

from the album Music to Driveby
- Released: July 19, 1992
- Recorded: 1992
- Studio: Big Beat Soundlabs (Los Angeles, California)
- Genre: West Coast hip-hop; gangsta rap
- Length: 3:39
- Label: Orpheus; Epic
- Songwriters: Aaron Tyler; Michael Bryant
- Producers: The Unknown DJ (exec.); DJ Mike T

Compton's Most Wanted singles chronology
"Growin' Up in tha Hood" (1991)	"Hood Took Me Under" (1992)	"This Is Compton 2000" (2000)

Music video
- "Hood Took Me Under" on YouTube

"Hood Took Me Under" is a song by American West Coast hip-hop group Compton's Most Wanted, released as a single from their third studio album Music to Driveby. Its lyrics were written and performed by MC Eiht. It was recorded at Big Beat Soundlabs in Los Angeles, produced by DJ Mike T, and released via Orpheus Records and Epic Records. The song samples Isaac Hayes' version of "Walk On By". The single peaked at number five on the Hot Rap Songs and at number 63 on the Hot R&B/Hip-Hop Singles Sales in the United States.

The song was featured in 2004 video game Grand Theft Auto: San Andreas in the fictional radio station Radio Los Santos. In the music video, several scenes depict gang-life in Los Angeles, and a little boy is shown growing up with the gangs and ending up in prison.

== Track listing ==
All lyrics are written by Aaron Tyler; all music is composed by Michael Bryant, except for tracks five and six composed with Terry Allen.

12"
No.	Title	Length
1.	"Hood Took Me Under (Radio Remix)" (clean version)	3:39
2.	"Hood Took Me Under (Remix)"	3:39
3.	"Hood Took Me Under (Remix Instrumental)" (uncensored)	3:39
4.	"Hood Took Me Under (O.G. Radio Mix)" (clean version)	3:39
5.	"Who's Fucking Who? (O.G. Mix)" (LP version)	1:46
6.	"Who's Fucking Who? (O.G. Instrumental)"	1:46

== Personnel ==
- Aaron Tyler – lyrics, vocals
- Michael Bryant – producer
- Terry Keith Allen – producer (tracks: 5, 6)
- Andre Manuel – executive producer
- Mike "Webeboomindashit" Edwards – mixing, recording
- Brian Gardner – mastering

== Charts ==
Chart (1992)	Peak position
US Hot Rap Songs (Billboard)	5
