= Representin' (album) =

Compilation album by MC Eiht
- Released: February 6, 2007
- Recorded: 1999–2000
- Genre: West coast hip hop gangsta rap
- Length: 47:00
- Label: Native Records
- Producer: The Unknown DJ

Representin' is a compilation album by MC Eiht and the re-release of Compton's Most Wanted's Represent by its frontman, MC Eiht. The album was released February 6, 2007.

== Track listing ==
1. "This Is Compton" – 4:14
2. "Some May Know" – 4:36
3. "Get Money" – 4:27
4. "What You Like It Like" – 4:32
5. "One Hundred Percent" – 2:43
6. "Then U Gone" – 3:54
7. "All Around The Hood" – 3:55
8. "Them Niggaz" – 3:50
9. "So Don't Go There" – 4:13
10. "Representin'" – 2:30
11. "Like Me" – 4:08
12. "Slang My Keys" – 4:22
13. "Livin Like Gangstaz (Bonus track) – 4:35
