= Fuck Compton =

Single by Tim Dog

from the album Penicillin on Wax
- Released: July 11, 1991
- Recorded: 1991
- Genre: East Coast hip hop; hardcore hip hop
- Length: 3:53
- Label: Ruffhouse
- Songwriter: Timothy Blair
- Producers: Ced-Gee; Tim Dog

Tim Dog singles chronology
"Fuck Compton" (1991)	"Step to Me" (1991)

Music video
- "Fuck Compton" on YouTube

Professional ratings
Review scores
Source	Rating
AllMusic	3/5 stars

"Fuck Compton" (censored as "Forget Compton" or "F**k Compton") is a diss track written and performed by the American rapper Tim Dog, released in 1991 through Ruffhouse Records as the lead single from the rapper's debut studio album Penicillin on Wax. It is a diss track criticizing the West Coast hip hop scene, including the Compton-based group N.W.A and its members Eazy-E and Dr. Dre as well as the latter's then-girlfriend Michel'le and former N.W.A member Ice Cube. The song is often credited for igniting the East Coast–West Coast rivalry of the 1990s. Production was handled by Ultramagnetic MCs' member Ced-Gee and Tim Dog himself. The song peaked atop of the US Billboard Hot Rap Songs chart. Later in 2018 it was place at No. 19 on Complex's "The 50 Best Hip-Hop Diss Songs" list.

== Background ==
During the late 1980s, multiple New York hip hop artists began to resent the exposure and success of their West Coast counterparts, an animosity which Tim Dog would tap into via the release of his groundbreaking first single. Frustrated at the apparent lack of interest in East Coast artists from record companies, Tim recorded "Fuck Compton", a scathing diss track from his debut album Penicillin on Wax. "Fuck Compton" attacked the city's style of dress and musical output and made threatening gestures to several Compton rappers including Eazy-E, MC Ren, Ice Cube, Dr. Dre and Michel'le. Tim Dog would later exclude Ice Cube on "Step to Me", another diss track attacking N.W.A.

The lyrics also made reference to an infamous incident involving N.W.A's Dr. Dre and Pump It Up host Dee Barnes. Barnes had accused Dre of assaulting her after Pump It Up had edited an N.W.A interview to include disparaging comments made by Ice Cube, who was embroiled in a feud with his former group at the time. The single was released by Ruffhouse Records, then-home to other artists such as Cypress Hill and Kris Kross, and became a worldwide underground hit in the clubs and hip hop circles. Two versions of a music video were released—the original version and a censored edition.

== Response ==
Dr. Dre and Snoop Doggy Dogg responded to the song on their 1993 single "Fuck wit Dre Day (And Everybody's Celebratin')" and on "The $20 Sack Pyramid" skit from Dr. Dre's 1992 album The Chronic. Compton's Most Wanted responded with the tracks "Who's Fucking Who?" and "Another Victim" from their 1992 album Music to Driveby. DJ Quik responded with the tracks "Way 2 Fonky" and "Tha Last Word" from his 1992 album Way 2 Fonky and on the track "P.S. Phuk U 2" with the Penthouse Players Clique from their 1992 album Paid the Cost. Tweedy Bird Loc responded with the track "Fuck the South Bronx" (featuring Att Will, Hitman D, D-Mark & Nini X) from his 1992 album 187 Ride By and E.L. Me and The Street Products responded in 2 tracks from their debut album titled 16 Lessons From the Streets on songs "E.L. Me and The Street Products" and "Outshout."

== Track listing ==
No.	Title	Producer(s)	Length
1.	"Fuck Compton" (Vocal)	Ced-Gee; Tim Dog	3:53
2.	"Fuck Compton" (Instrumental)	Ced-Gee; Tim Dog	3:53
3.	"Goin' Wild In The Penile" (Vocal)	Ced-Gee; Tim Dog; Moe Love (co.); TR Love (co.)	4:16
4.	"Goin' Wild In The Penile" (Instrumental)	Ced-Gee; Tim Dog; Moe Love (co.); TR Love (co.)	4:16

== Personnel ==
- Timothy "Tim Dog" Blair – lyrics, vocals, producer, mixing
- Cedric "Ced-Gee" Miller – producer, mixing
- Kurt Woodley – mixing
- Joe "The Butcher" Nicolo – engineering
- Leo "Swift" Morris – additional engineering
- Howie Weinberg – mastering
- Francesca Restrepo – art direction
- Jesse Frohman – photography

== Charts ==
Chart (1991)	Peak position
US Hot Rap Songs (Billboard)	1

== See also ==
- List of notable diss tracks
