= Biker Boyz (soundtrack) =

Biker Boyz: Music from the Motion Picture

Soundtrack album by various artists
- Released: January 28, 2003
- Recorded: 2002
- Genres: Hip hop; rock
- Length: 1:00:49
- Label: DreamWorks
- Producers: John Houlihan (exec.); Michael Ostin (exec.); Reggie Rock Bythewood (exec.); Todd Homme (exec.); Adam Bravin; Bam; Damon Elliott; David Ryan Harris; E3; Howard Benson; JR Ewng; Meshell Ndegeocello; Necro; Nitti; Redman; Supa Dave West; Swizz Beatz; The Neptunes; Uzi

Singles from Biker Boyz
- 1. "Bigger Business" Released: December 14, 2002; 2. "Ride" Released: 2003

Professional ratings
Review scores
Source	Rating
AllMusic	3/5 stars
HipHopDX	3/5

Biker Boyz: Music from the Motion Picture is the soundtrack album to Reggie Rock Bythewood's 2003 film Biker Boyz. It was released on January 28, 2003 through DreamWorks Records and is composed of a blend of hip hop and rock music.

Production was handled by Swizz Beatz, Adam Bravin, Bam, Damon Elliott, David Ryan Harris, E3, Howard Benson, JR Ewng, Meshell Ndegeocello, Necro, Nitti, Redman, Supa Dave West, The Neptunes and Uzi, with co-producers Bob Rock and Metallica. John Houlihan, Michael Ostin, Reggie Rock Bythewood and Todd Homme served as executive producers.

It features contributions from Swizz Beatz, David Ryan Harris, Cassidy, E3, Jadakiss, Ja Rule, JR Ewng, Keyshia Cole, Loon, Me'Shell NdegéOcello, Metallica, Mos Def, Mowett, Mr. Murder, Mystic, N.E.R.D., Non Phixion, Papa Roach, P.O.D., Redman, Ronald Isley, Slick Boyz and The Crystal Method.

The album debuted at number 98 on the Billboard Top R&B/Hip-Hop Albums chart and at number 22 on the Top Soundtracks charts in the United States.

== Track listing ==
No.	Title	Writer(s)	Producer(s)	Length
1.	"Ride" (Redman and E3)	Reginald Noble; Ellis Hall	Redman; E3	3:22
2.	"Boom (The Crystal Method Remix)" (P.O.D.)	Paul Joshua Sandoval; Mark Daniels; Marcos Curiel; Noah Bernardo	Howard Benson	3:33
3.	"We Did It Again" (Metallica, Ja Rule and Swizz Beatz)	James Hetfield; Kirk Hammett; Lars Ulrich; Jeffrey Atkins; Kaseem Dean	Bob Rock (co.); Metallica (co.); Swizz Beatz (co.)	4:41
4.	"Don't Look Back" (Papa Roach and N.E.R.D.)	Jacoby Shaddix; Jerry Horton; Tobin Esperance; Dave Buckner; Pharrell Williams	The Neptunes	3:25
5.	"Ride Out" (Swizz Beatz featuring Cassidy)	Dean; Barry Reese	Swizz Beatz	3:27
6.	"Renegade" (JR Ewng)	JR Ewng; Anthony Haskins	JR Ewng; Uzi	3:27
7.	"Kalifornia" (Mos Def)	Dante Smith; John McLaughlin; Ronald Hudson; Mikel Hooks; Larry Troutman; Roger Troutman	Adam Bravin	5:05
8.	"Tru Rider" (Mowett and Loon)	Brandon Stringfield; Christian Dudley; Jerry Franklin; Mikka Harvey; Chauncey Hawkins; DeWayne Staten; David Paich; Jeff Porcaro	Bam	3:58
9.	"Get Up" (Keyshia Cole)	Keyshia Cole; Damon Elliott; Mýa Harrison	Damon Elliott	3:17
10.	"No Competition" (Mystic)	Mandolyn Wind Ludlum; David Nathaniel West	Supa Dave West	4:08
11.	"Big Business" (Jadakiss featuring Ron Isley)	Jason Phillips; Ronald Isley; Dean	Swizz Beatz	4:34
12.	"Say Goodbye to Yesterday (Remix)" (Non Phixion)	John Fuentes; Mitchell Manzanilla; William Braunstein	Necro	3:54
13.	"Liliquoi Moon" (Me'Shell Ndegéocello)	Michelle Lynn Johnson	Me'Shell Ndegéocello	5:05
14.	"Don't Look Down" (David Ryan Harris)	David Ryan Harris	David Ryan Harris	3:40
15.	"Biker Boyz" (Slick Boyz and Mr. Murder)	Kwan McGincy; Meko Walker; Erik Smith; Chadron Moore	Nitti	4:45
16.	"King in Me" (David Ryan Harris)	David Ryan Harris		2:01
Total length:				1:00:49

Sample credits

- Track 7 contains samples of "West Coast Poplock" written by Ronnie Hudson, Mikel Hooks, Larry Troutman and Roger Troutman, and "You Know, You Know" written by John McLaughlin.
- Track 8 contains a sample of "Africa" written by David Paich and Jeff Porcaro and performed by Toto.

Notes

- Tracks 5 does not appear in the film.

== Personnel ==
- Tommy Uzzo – mixing (track 1)
- Chris Lord-Alge – mixing (track 4)
- Dave Pensado – mixing (track 9)
- Richard "Segal" Huredia – mixing (track 10)
- Eddy Schreyer – mastering
- John Houlihan – executive producer
- Michael Ostin – executive producer
- Reggie Rock Bythewood – executive producer
- Todd Homme – executive producer
- Stefan G. Bucher – art direction, design
- David Sameth – artwork
- Cindi Smith – coordinator
- Kenneth "Kaz" Smith – coordinator
- Season Kent – coordinator
- Jabari Ali – supervisor
- Jennifer Schiller – music clearances
- Julie Butchko – music clearances
- Marisa Barela – music clearances
- Lenny Wohl – management

== Charts ==
Weekly chart performance for Biker Boyz soundtrack
Chart (2003)	Peak position
US Top R&B/Hip-Hop Albums (Billboard)	98
US Top Soundtracks (Billboard)	22
