= Soundtracks of Grand Theft Auto: San Andreas =

Grand Theft Auto: San Andreas is an open-world, action-adventure video game developed by Rockstar North and published by Rockstar Games. First released on 26 October 2004 for the PlayStation 2, San Andreas has an in-game radio that can tune in to eleven stations playing more than 150 tracks of licensed music, as well as a talk radio station. The songs featured on the radio stations originated in or before the early 1990s, the period in which the game is set.

The game's music has been released on two official soundtracks; Grand Theft Auto: San Andreas Official Soundtrack, released in November 2004, consisting of selections from the in-game radio, and Grand Theft Auto: San Andreas Official Soundtrack Box Set, released in December 2004, consisting of eight volumes comprising most of the songs from the game's radio stations. Critical reception to the soundtracks was positive, as reviewers felt that the selected tracks connected appropriately with the gameplay and period.

== Albums ==
=== Grand Theft Auto: San Andreas Official Soundtrack ===
Grand Theft Auto: San Andreas Official Soundtrack

Soundtrack album by various artists
- Released: November 23, 2004
- Genres: Hip hop; new jack swing; house; country; gangsta rap; funk; alternative metal; reggae; rock; soul; grunge; soft rock; G-funk
- Length: 106:40
- Label: Interscope

Professional ratings
Review scores
Source	Rating
AllMusic	4/5 stars
The Guardian	(positive)

Grand Theft Auto: San Andreas Official Soundtrack features selected tracks from the in-game radio stations. It was released as a three-disc album on November 23, 2004, by Interscope Records. The first two discs featured the songs, while the third disc is a DVD featuring The Introduction, a short machinima video depicting events before the game.

Disc one
No.	Title	Length
1.	"San Andreas Theme Song" (Michael Hunter)	6:10
2.	"Killing in the Name" (Rage Against the Machine)	5:17
3.	"I Don't Give a Fuck" (2Pac)	6:16
4.	"The Payback" (James Brown)	7:39
5.	"West Coast Poplock" (Ronnie Hudson & the Street People)	5:30
6.	"Groove Me" (Guy)	4:44
7.	"Two Tickets to Paradise" (Eddie Money)	3:32
8.	"How I Could Just Kill a Man" (Cypress Hill)	4:10
9.	"Pressure Drop" (Toots & the Maytals)	3:44
10.	"Children's Story" (Slick Rick)	3:57
11.	"Cold Blooded" (Rick James)	4:03
12.	"Break 4 Love" (Raze)	5:17
Total length:		1:00:19

Disc two
No.	Title	Length
1.	"Funky Worm" (Ohio Players)	2:42
2.	"Barracuda" (Heart)	3:59
3.	"Hood Took Me Under" (Compton's Most Wanted)	3:56
4.	"Think (About It)" (Lyn Collins)	3:25
5.	"Rebel Without a Pause" (Public Enemy)	5:19
6.	"Midlife Crisis" (Faith No More)	3:52
7.	"Poison" (Bell Biv DeVoe)	4:49
8.	"I Chase the Devil" (Max Romeo & the Upsetters)	3:20
9.	"I Know You Got Soul" (Eric B. & Rakim)	2:51
10.	"Crazy" (Willie Nelson)	3:59
11.	"Head Like a Hole" (AFI)	4:44
Total length:		42:56

=== Grand Theft Auto: San Andreas Official Soundtrack Box Set ===
Grand Theft Auto: San Andreas Official Soundtrack Box Set

Box set by various artists
- Released: December 7, 2004
- Genres: Hip hop; old-school hip hop; alternative hip hop; West Coast hip hop; gangsta rap; funk; new jack swing; contemporary R&B; pop; reggae; dancehall; country; soul; rare groove; alternative rock; heavy metal; alternative metal; grunge; hard rock; rap rock; classic rock; country rock; Southern rock; blues rock; folk rock; punk rock; new wave; synthpop; Chicago house; acid house; deep house
- Length: 386:43
- Label: Interscope

Professional ratings
Review scores
Source	Rating
AllMusic	4/5 stars
IGN	7.3/10
The Michigan Daily	4.5/5
NME	9/10

Grand Theft Auto: San Andreas Official Soundtrack Box Set comprises highlights from the game's radio stations. The box set was released on December 7, 2004, across eight discs, separated by genre. The house music station SF-UR and talk radio station WCTR are excluded.

Volume 1: Bounce FM (funk)
No.	Title	Writer(s)	Artist(s)	Length
1.	"Bounce FM Intro"	Dan Houser; Lazlow Jones		0:07
2.	"Hollywood Swinging"	Robert "Kool" Bell; Ronald Nathan Bell; George M. Brown; Robert "Spike" Mickens; Claydes Charles Smith; Dennis R. Thomas; Rick A. Westfield	Kool & the Gang	3:27
3.	"Cold Blooded"	Rick James	Rick James	5:56
4.	"You Dropped a Bomb on Me"	Lonnie Simmons; Rudy Taylor; Charlie K. "Uncle Charlie" Wilson	The Gap Band	5:07
5.	"Candy"	Larry Blackmon; Thomas Jenkins	Cameo	5:45
6.	"West Coast Poplock"	Ronnie Hudson; Mikel Hooks; Roger Troutman; Larry Troutman	Ronnie Hudson	5:25
7.	"You're on Bounce FM"	Dan Houser; Lazlow Jones		0:11
8.	"I Can Make You Dance"	Roger Troutman; Larry Troutman	Zapp	3:59
9.	"Let It Whip"	Reggie Andrews; Leon "Ndugu" Chancler	Dazz Band	4:42
10.	"Running Away"	Roy Ayers; Edwin Birdsong	Roy Ayers	3:10
11.	"Funky Worm"	Leroy "Sugarfoot" Bonner	Ohio Players	2:39
12.	"Twilight"	Frankie Beverly	Maze	6:37
13.	"That Was Bounce FM"	Dan Houser; Lazlow Jones		0:11
14.	"Glory Hole Theme Park: Fun With Strangers"	Dan Houser; Lazlow Jones	Mike Blakeney	0:49
15.	"Eris Pump Up Shoes"	Dan Houser; Lazlow Jones	Various artists	1:18
Total length:				48:29

Volume 2: Playback FM / Radio Los Santos (hip hop)
No.	Title	Writer(s)	Artist(s)	Length
1.	"Playback FM Intro"	Dan Houser; Lazlow Jones		0:12
2.	"Rebel Without a Pause"	Chuck D; Terminator X; Eric "Vietnam" Sadler; Hank Shocklee	Public Enemy	5:02
3.	"Brand Nubian"	Grand Puba; Sadat X; Lord Jamar	Brand Nubian	4:37
4.	"Children's Story"	Rick Walters	Slick Rick	3:58
5.	"You're on Playback FM"	Dan Houser; Lazlow Jones		0:05
6.	"I Know You Got Soul"	James Brown; Bobby Byrd	Eric B. & Rakim	4:43
7.	"It Takes Two"	James Brown; Robert Ginyard	Rob Base and DJ E-Z Rock	4:45
8.	"That Was Playback FM"	Dan Houser; Lazlow Jones		0:11
9.	"La Raza"	Arturo R. Molina, Jr.; Antonio Gonzalez; Gerald Wilson	Kid Frost	3:26
10.	"It's Funky Enough"	Tracy Curry	The D.O.C.	4:28
11.	"Guerillas in tha Mist"	Da Lench Mob	Da Lench Mob	4:25
12.	"Hood Took Me Under"	Aaron Tyler; Michael Bryant	Compton's Most Wanted	3:39
13.	"How I Could Just Kill a Man"	B-Real; DJ Muggs; Sen Dog; Lowell Fulson; Jimmy McCracklin	Cypress Hill	4:07
14.	"I Don't Give a Fuck"	Tupac Shakur; Pogo	2Pac	4:19
15.	"Ice Diamonds"	Dan Houser; Lazlow Jones		0:48
16.	"Commando Pest Eradication"	Dan Houser; Lazlow Jones		1:16
Total length:				50:01

Volume 3: Master Sounds 98.3 (soul, groove, and funk)
No.	Title	Writer(s)	Artist(s)	Length
1.	"Mastersounds 98.3 Intro"	Dan Houser; Lazlow Jones		0:17
2.	"The Payback"	James Brown; John Starks; Fred Wesley	James Brown	7:36
3.	"Jungle Fever"	Bill Ador	The Chakachas	4:21
4.	"Think (About It)"	James Brown	Lyn Collins	3:20
5.	"I Know You Got Soul"	James Brown; Charles Bobbitt; Bobby Byrd	Bobby Byrd	4:40
6.	"Express Yourself"	Charles Wright	Charles Wright & the Watts 103rd Street Rhythm Band	3:50
7.	"Cross the Tracks (We Better Go Back)"	James Brown	Maceo & The Macks	3:16
8.	"You're on Mastersounds 98.3"	Dan Houser; Lazlow Jones		0:19
9.	"(I Got) So Much Trouble In My Mind"	Joe Quarterman	Sir Joe Quarterman and Free Soul	6:17
10.	"The Grunt"	James Brown; Clyde Stubblefield; Robert McCollough; Darryl Jamison; William Collins; Phelps Collins; Frank Waddy; Clayton Gunnels; Johnny Griggs	The J.B.'s	3:30
11.	"Smokin' Cheeba Cheeba"	Paul Winley	Harlem Underground Band	7:33
12.	"Funky President"	James Brown	James Brown	4:08
13.	"Green Onions"	Booker T. Jones; Steve "The Colonel" Cropper; Lewie Steinberg; Al Jackson Jr.	Booker T. & the M.G.'s	2:52
14.	"That Was Mastersounds 98.3"	Dan Houser; Lazlow Jones		0:16
15.	"Cluckin' Bell"	Dan Houser; Lazlow Jones	Alex Anthony	0:48
16.	"Zebra Bar: Fun To Try"	Dan Houser; Lazlow Jones	Ed McMann	0:31
Total length:				53:34

Volume 4: K Rose (country and western)
No.	Title	Writer(s)	Artist(s)	Length
1.	"K-Rose Intro"	Dan Houser; Lazlow Jones		0:12
2.	"Crazy"	Willie Nelson	Willie Nelson	3:57
3.	"Hey Good Lookin'"	Hank Williams	Hank Williams	2:53
4.	"Louisiana Woman, Mississippi Man"	Becki Bluefield; Jim Owen	Conway Twitty & Loretta Lynn	2:30
5.	"Bed of Rose's"	Harold Reid	Statler Brothers	2:24
6.	"You're on K-Rose"	Dan Houser; Lazlow Jones		0:08
7.	"Amos Moses"	Jerry Reed	Jerry Reed	2:17
8.	"I Love a Rainy Night"	Eddie Rabbitt; David Malloy; Even Stevens	Eddie Rabbitt	3:07
9.	"All My Ex's Live in Texas"	Sanger D. Shafer; Lyndia J. Shafer	Whitey Shafer	3:19
10.	"Mammas Don't Let Your Babies Grow up to Be Cowboys"	Ed Bruce; Patsy Bruce	Ed Bruce	3:20
11.	"Always Wanting You"	Merle Haggard	Merle Haggard	3:06
12.	"Three Cigarettes in an Ashtray"	Edward Miller; W.S. Stevenson	Patsy Cline	2:13
13.	"That Was K-Rose"	Dan Houser; Lazlow Jones		0:06
14.	"Logger"	Dan Houser; Lazlow Jones	Ed McMann	0:31
15.	"Starfish Resort and Casino"	Dan Houser; Lazlow Jones		1:04
Total length:				31:07

Volume 5: CSR 103.9 (new jack swing and modern soul)
No.	Title	Writer(s)	Artist(s)	Length
1.	"CSR 103.9 Intro"	Dan Houser; Lazlow Jones		0:09
2.	"Groove Me"	Teddy Riley; Aaron Hall; Gene Griffin; Timothy Gatling	Guy	4:34
3.	"I Got the Feeling"	Elliot "Dr. Freeze" Straite	Today	4:05
4.	"Don't Be Cruel"	Kenneth Edmonds; Antonio Reid; Daryl Simmons	Bobby Brown	6:48
5.	"My Lovin' (You're Never Gonna Get It)"	Denzil Foster; Thomas McElroy; James Brown; John Starks; Fred Wesley	En Vogue	4:42
6.	"New Jack Swing"	Aqil Davidson; Markell Riley; Brandon Mitchell	Wreckx-N-Effect	3:45
7.	"Motownphilly"	Dallas L. Austin; Michael Bivins; Nathan Morris; Shawn Stockman	Boyz II Men	3:55
8.	"You're on CSR 103.9"	Dan Houser; Lazlow Jones		0:10
9.	"Poison"	Elliot "Dr. Freeze" Straite	Bell Biv DeVoe	4:21
10.	"So You Like What You See"	Samuelle	Samuelle	4:57
11.	"I'm So into You"	Brian Alexander Morgan	SWV	4:38
12.	"Don't Be Afraid"	Aaron Hall; Floyd F. Fisher	Aaron Hall	5:18
13.	"Sensitivity"	James Harris III; Terry Lewis	Ralph Tresvant	4:40
14.	"That Was CSR 103.9"	Dan Houser; Lazlow Jones		0:07
15.	"Renegade Cologne"	Dan Houser; Lazlow Jones	Jeff Berlin	0:48
16.	"The Epsilon Program – Covet"	Dan Houser; Lazlow Jones	Fred Melamed	0:43
Total length:				52:34

Volume 6: K-Jah West (dancehall, ragga, reggae, and dub)
No.	Title	Writer(s)	Artist(s)	Length
1.	"K-Jah Intro"	Dan Houser; Lazlow Jones		0:11
2.	"Chase the Devil"	Lee "Scratch" Perry; Max Romeo	Max Romeo & The Upsetters	3:24
3.	"Here I Come"	Barrington Levy	Barrington Levy	3:43
4.	"Great Train Robbery"	Delroy "Junior" Reid	Black Uhuru	5:53
5.	"Ring My Bell"	Frederick Knight	Blood Sisters	7:56
6.	"Funky Kingston"	Frederick "Toots" Hibbert	Toots & the Maytals	4:53
7.	"King Tubby Meets the Rockers Uptown"	Augustus Pablo	Augustus Pablo	2:28
8.	"You're on K-Jah"	Dan Houser; Lazlow Jones		0:10
9.	"Bam Bam"	Frederick "Toots" Hibbert	Chaka Demus & Pliers	4:03
10.	"Cocaine in My Brain"	Lester Randal Bullock	Dillinger	2:44
11.	"Don't Let It Go to Your Head"	Kenneth Gamble; Leon Huff	Black Harmony	7:18
12.	"Drum Pan Sound"	Reggie Stepper	Reggie Stepper	3:23
13.	"Pressure Drop"	Frederick "Toots" Hibbert	The Maytals	3:41
14.	"That Was K-Jah"	Dan Houser; Lazlow Jones		0:10
15.	"Sooth Cough Medicine"	Dan Houser; Lazlow Jones	Ed McMann	0:56
16.	"Wrestling on Weazel"	Dan Houser; Lazlow Jones		1:21
Total length:				52:14

Volume 7: K-DST (rock and roll)
No.	Title	Writer(s)	Artist(s)	Length
1.	"K-DST Intro"	Dan Houser; Lazlow Jones		0:06
2.	"Barracuda"	Ann Wilson; Roger Fisher; Nancy Wilson; Michael Derosier	Heart	4:21
3.	"Strutter"	Gene Simmons; Paul Stanley	Kiss	3:09
4.	"Smokin'"	Tom Scholz; Brad Delp	Boston	4:19
5.	"Some Kind of Wonderful"	Willie John Ellison	Grand Funk Railroad	3:21
6.	"Woman to Woman"	Joe Cocker; Chris Stainton	Joe Cocker	4:26
7.	"Get Down to It"	Steve Marriott	Humble Pie	3:24
8.	"You're on K-DST"	Dan Houser; Lazlow Jones		0:10
9.	"A Horse with No Name"	Dewey Bunnell	America	4:07
10.	"Eminence Front"	Pete Townshend	The Who	5:39
11.	"Free Bird"	Ronnie Van Zant; Allen Collins	Lynyrd Skynyrd	9:04
12.	"Two Tickets to Paradise"	Eddie Money	Eddie Money	3:57
13.	"Young Turks"	Rod Stewart; Carmine Appice; Duane Hitchings; Kevin Savigar	Rod Stewart	5:02
14.	"That Was K-DST"	Dan Houser; Lazlow Jones		0:12
15.	"Midlife Crisis Center"	Dan Houser; Lazlow Jones	Jonathan Hanst	1:11
16.	"San Andreas Telephone: New Father"	Dan Houser; Lazlow Jones	Ben Krech	0:21
Total length:				52:49

Volume 8: Radio X (alternative rock)
No.	Title	Writer(s)	Artist(s)	Length
1.	"Radio X Intro"	Dan Houser; Lazlow Jones		0:13
2.	"Rusty Cage"	Chris Cornell	Soundgarden	4:25
3.	"Unsung"	Page Hamilton	Helmet	3:56
4.	"Midlife Crisis"	Mike Patton; Roddy Bottum; Mike Bordin; Billy Gould	Faith No More	4:16
5.	"Plush"	Scott Weiland; Eric Kretz; Robert DeLeo	Stone Temple Pilots	5:10
6.	"Killing in the Name"	Tim Commerford; Zack de la Rocha; Tom Morello; Brad Wilk	Rage Against the Machine	5:13
7.	"You're on Radio X"	Dan Houser; Lazlow Jones		0:10
8.	"Cult of Personality"	Corey Glover; Vernon Reid; Muzz Skillings; Will Calhoun	Living Colour	4:53
9.	"Mother"	Glenn Danzig	Danzig	3:24
10.	"Personal Jesus"	Martin L. Gore	Depeche Mode	4:53
11.	"Been Caught Stealing"	Eric Avery; Perry Farrell	Jane's Addiction	3:30
12.	"Pretend We're Dead"	Donita Sparks	L7	3:53
13.	"That Was Radio X"	Dan Houser; Lazlow Jones		0:09
14.	"My Five Uncles"	Dan Houser; Lazlow Jones	Jonathan Hanst	0:56
15.	"Exsorbeo Handheld Gaming System"	Dan Houser; Lazlow Jones		0:54
Total length:				49:55

== See also ==
- Music of Grand Theft Auto V
