= BX Warrior =

Studio album by Tim Dog
- Released: May 19, 2006
- Recorded: 2004–2006
- Genre: Hip hop
- Length: 54:30
- Labels: Def-Dick; Big City
- Producers: Tim Dog (also exec.); Dr. Zygote; Jazz T; Moe Love; Ollie Twist

Tim Dog chronology
Immortal (2003)	BX Warrior (2006)

Singles from BX Warrior
- 1. "The Original Dog" Released: 2005; 2. "Run Run Run / Hardcore" Released: 2007

Professional ratings
Review scores
Source	Rating
RapReviews	6/10

Bx Warrior is the fourth and final studio album by American New York-based rapper Tim Dog. It was released on May 19, 2006 via Def-Dick/Big City Entertainment, and was produced by Dr. Zygote & Jazz T (from Diversion Tactics), Moe Love (from Ultramagnetic MCs), Ollie Twist, and Tim Dog himself.

== Track listing ==
No.	Title	Producer(s)	Length
1.	"BX Warrior"	Tim Dog	4:31
2.	"From BX"	Tim Dog	2:43
3.	"BX We Invented Hip Hop"	Tim Dog	3:43
4.	"Original Dog [BX Mix]"	Tim Dog	4:02
5.	"Get in That Ass"	Dr. Zygote; Jazz T	3:15
6.	"Run Run Run"	Dr. Zygote; Jazz T	2:34
7.	"Love 4 Us (Ultramagnetic)"	Moe Love	3:50
8.	"Revenge of Da Old School"	Tim Dog	2:55
9.	"Original Dog [Twist Mix]"	Ollie Twist	6:13
10.	"Mind Games (Ultramagnetic)"	Moe Love	5:13
11.	"Hardcore"	Dr. Zygote; Jazz T	4:10
12.	"I'm That Pimp"	Tim Dog	3:21
13.	"Hold You Down"	Tim Dog	2:57
14.	"No More Interviews"	Tim Dog	5:03
Total length:			54:30
