= It's a Compton Thang =

It's a Compton Thang!

Studio album by Compton's Most Wanted
- Released: June 19, 1990
- Studios: Thllss (Los Angeles, California)
- Genres: West Coast hip hop; gangsta rap
- Length: 46:44
- Label: Orpheus
- Producers: The Unknown DJ; DJ Slip

Compton's Most Wanted chronology
It's a Compton Thang! (1990)	Straight Checkn 'Em (1991)

Singles from It's a Compton Thang!
- 1. "This Is Compton" Released: 1989; 2. "One Time Gaffled Em Up" Released: 1990; 3. "I'm wit Dat" Released: 1990

It's a Compton Thang! is the debut studio album by American gangsta rap group Compton's Most Wanted. It was released in 1990 through Orpheus Records.

The recording sessions took place at Thllss Studios in Los Angeles with audio engineer Mike "Webeboomindashit" Edwards and producers DJ Slip and the Unknown DJ. It was mastered at The Other Room in Queens, New York, by Jack Skinner. Ant Capone was supposed to be part of the group, but left prior to this album due to contractual and managing issues, and was replaced by DJ Mike T.

The album peaked at number 133 on the Billboard 200 and at number 32 on the Top R&B/Hip-Hop Albums chart in the United States.

== Critical reception ==
Professional ratings
Review scores
Source	Rating
AllMusic	4/5 stars

AllMusic noted that "the true beauty of It's a Compton Thang is the initial synthesis of former electro legend the Unknown DJ with future gangsta icon MC Eiht as well as the pleasant reminder that West Coast gangsta rap was once more about old-fashioned fun than cheap thrills." The Washington Post thought that the album "lacks the sonic punch and the verbal verve of N.W.A."

== Track listing ==
No.	Title	Length
1.	"One Time Gaffled Em Up"	3:55
2.	"I'm wit Dat"	4:56
3.	"Final Chapter"	4:37
4.	"I Give Up Nothin'"	3:03
5.	"This Is Compton"	4:32
6.	"Rhymes Too Funky Part 1 (Live at Lonzo's 1988)"	2:29
7.	"Duck Sick"	4:32
8.	"Give It Up"	4:09
9.	"Late Night Hype"	4:49
10.	"I Mean Biznez"	3:47
11.	"It's a Compton Thang"	5:11
Total length:		47:03

== Personnel ==
- Aaron Tyler – lyrics, vocals
- Vernon Johnson - lyrics, vocals
- Terry Keith Allen – producer, arranger
- Michael Bryant – scratches
- Andre Manuel – keyboards, producer, arranger, executive producer
- Darryl "Lyrrad" Davis – additional keyboards, design
- Mike "Webeboomindashit" Edwards – engineering
- Jack Skinner – mastering
- Henry Marquez – art direction
- Phil Bedel – photography
- Weldon Cochren – production coordinator
- Lynda Simmons – project coordinator

== Charts ==
Chart (1990)	Peak position
US Billboard 200	133
US Top R&B/Hip-Hop Albums (Billboard)	32
