= Straight Checkn 'Em =

Studio album by Compton's Most Wanted
- Released: July 16, 1991
- Recorded: March – April 1991
- Studio: Big Beat Soundlabs (Los Angeles, California); Trax Recording Studio (Hollywood, California)
- Genre: West Coast hip hop; gangsta rap
- Length: 46:22
- Label: Orpheus; Epic
- Producer: The Unknown DJ; DJ Slip

Compton's Most Wanted chronology
| It's a Compton Thang (1990) | Straight Checkn 'Em (1991) | Music to Driveby (1992) |

Singles from Straight Checkn 'Em
- 1. "Growin' Up in the Hood" Released: June 20, 1991; 2. "Straight Checkn 'Em" Released: September 12, 1991; 3. "Compton's Lynchin' / They Still Gafflin" Released: January 30, 1992

Professional ratings
Review scores
| Source | Rating |
|---|---|
| AllMusic | 3/5 stars |
| Entertainment Weekly | A− |

Straight Checkn 'Em is the second studio album by American gangsta rap group Compton's Most Wanted. It was released on July 16, 1991, through Orpheus Records and Epic Records. Recording sessions took place at Big Beat Soundlabs in Los Angeles from April 2 to April 19, 1991, except for the song "Growin' Up in the Hood" recorded and mixed at Trax Recording Studio in Hollywood on March 31, 1991. Production was handled entirely by DJ Slip and the Unknown DJ.

The album spawned three singles: "Growin' Up in the Hood", "Straight Checkn 'Em" and "Compton's Lynchin'"/"They Still Gafflin'". Its lead single, "Growin' Up in the Hood", made it to #1 on the Hot Rap Songs chart and was featured in 1991 film Boyz n the Hood and the film's soundtrack. The second single, a title track "Straight Checkn 'Em", peaked at #16 on the same Billboard chart. Along with the singles, music videos were directed for the songs "Growin' Up in the Hood" and "Straight Checkn 'Em".

The album peaked at number 92 on the Billboard 200 and at number 23 on the Top R&B/Hip-Hop Albums chart in the United States.

== Track listing ==
All lyrics are written by Aaron Tyler.

| No. | Title | Music | Length |
|---|---|---|---|
| 1. | "Intro" | T. Allen; A. Manuel | 1:02 |
| 2. | "They Still Gafflin'" | T. Allen; A. Manuel; I. Hayes | 4:29 |
| 3. | "Growin' Up in the Hood" | T. Allen; A. Manuel; J. Simon | 4:11 |
| 4. | "Wanted" | T. Allen; A. Manuel; B. White | 4:14 |
| 5. | "Straight Checkn 'Em" | T. Allen; A. Manuel | 3:46 |
| 6. | "I Don't Dance" | T. Allen; A. Manuel; G. Clinton, Jr.; G. Shider; D. Spradley | 2:29 |
| 7. | "Raised in Compton" | T. Allen; A. Manuel | 3:48 |
| 8. | "Driveby Miss Daisy" | T. Allen; A. Manuel; W. Zimmerman | 4:26 |
| 9. | "Def Wish" | T. Allen; A. Manuel | 3:41 |
| 10. | "Compton's Lynchin'" | T. Allen; A. Manuel; J. Watson | 4:42 |
| 11. | "Mike T's Funky Scratch" | T. Allen; A. Manuel | 2:34 |
| 12. | "Can I Kill It?" | T. Allen; A. Manuel; E. Noble; C. Womack; L. Womack; E. Isley; M. Isley; O. Isley; R. Isley; R. Isley; C. Jasper | 4:30 |
| 13. | "Gangsta Shot Out" | T. Allen; A. Manuel | 2:32 |
| Total length: | | | 46:22 |

== Personnel ==
- Aaron Tyler – lyrics, vocals
- Terry Keith Allen – drum programming, scratches, producer, arranger
- Michael Bryant – scratches
- Andre Manuel – drum programming, producer, arranger, recording, mixing, executive producer
- William Fredric Zimmerman – piano (track 8)
- Mike "Webeboomindashit" Edwards – recording, mixing
- Brian Gardner – mastering
- David Provost – photography

== Charts ==
| Chart (1991) | Peak position |
|---|---|
| US Billboard 200 | 92 |
| US Top R&B/Hip-Hop Albums (Billboard) | 23 |
