= Immortal (Tim Dog album) =

Studio album by Tim Dog
- Released: 2003
- Genre: East Coast hip hop

Tim Dog chronology
Big Time (1996)	Immortal (2003)	BX Warrior (2006)

Immortal is the third studio album by American rapper Tim Dog, released in 2003.

== Track listing ==
1. Intro
2. Dog Shit
3. You Don't Know Me
4. Hustluz
5. The Professional
6. Bring It
7. It Ain't Funny
8. Makin' Love written and performed by Ty Howard aka Tye Murda
9. Make It Last
10. Can I Live
11. Get Out Da' Life
12. Sun Don't Shine
13. Pop Life
14. We Can Grow
15. Immortal
