= California Love =

1995 single by 2Pac featuring Dr. Dre

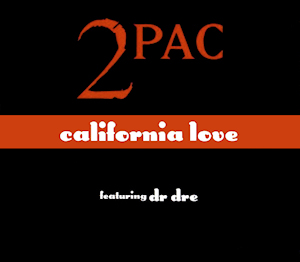

Single by 2Pac featuring Dr. Dre and Roger Troutman

from the album All Eyez on Me (UK edition)
- A-side: "How Do U Want It"
- Released: December 3, 1995
- Studio: Can-Am (Los Angeles, California)
- Genre: West Coast hip-hop; gangsta rap; G-funk
- Length: 6:29 (original version); 6:26 (remix); 4:45 (single version)
- Label: Death Row; Interscope
- Songwriters: Tupac Shakur; Roger Troutman; Larry Troutman; Mikel Hooks; Norman Durham; Ronald Hudson; Woody Cunningham; Joe Cocker; Chris Stainton; James Anderson
- Producer: Dr. Dre

2Pac singles chronology
"Temptations" (1995)	"California Love" (1995)	"How Do U Want It" (1996)

Dr. Dre singles chronology
"Keep Their Heads Ringin'" (1995)	"California Love" (1995)	"No Diggity" (1996)

Audio sample
- file; help

Music video
- "California Love" on YouTube

Music video
- "California Love" (Remix) on YouTube

"California Love" is a song by American rapper 2Pac featuring fellow American rapper Dr. Dre and American musician Roger Troutman. The song was released December 3, 1995, as 2Pac's comeback single after his release from prison in 1995 and was his first single as the newest artist of Death Row Records. The original version is featured on the UK version of his fourth album, All Eyez on Me (1996).

"California Love" is one of 2Pac's most widely known and most successful singles. It reached number one on the US Billboard Hot 100 for two weeks (as a double A-side single with "How Do U Want It") and also topped the charts of Italy, New Zealand, and Sweden. The song was posthumously nominated for the Grammy Award for Best Rap Performance by a Duo or Group in 1997. The music video for "California Love", based on a concept by Jada Pinkett Smith and inspired by Mad Max Beyond Thunderdome, was directed by Hype Williams.

== Writing, samples and background ==
The earliest version of "California Love" was made by Dr. Dre, containing three verses of his own rapping, along with Roger Troutman's talk box vocal chorus. According to Death Row studio engineer Tommy Daugherty, the only copy of this session was given to DJ Jam, Snoop Dogg's personal concert deejay. Daugherty said that Tupac's arrival at Death Row Records made Dre want to leave, and that Dre was intending to use "California Love" as the first release for his new Aftermath Entertainment label. But Suge Knight heard the track and pushed for Tupac to replace Dre as the song's rapper, to become Tupac's comeback hit song for Death Row. Producer Laylaw also remixed the song, but this is often erroneously credited to Dr. Dre. The original was released as a double-A side single together with "How Do U Want It" and intended for the Dr. Dre album The Chronic II, while the remix was included on 2Pac's All Eyez on Me. The song was made and written in Dr. Dre's in-house studio. Tupac came in and took just 15 minutes to write his verse. The weekend after the song was completed, the video was recorded.

The hook is taken from EPMD's 1989 song "Knick Knack Patty Wack" which in turn is based on a sample taken from Joe Cocker's 1972 song "Woman to Woman". The chorus, "California knows how to party", was sung by Roger Troutman using his characteristic talk box and was taken from the 1982 song "West Coast Poplock" by Ronnie Hudson & The Street People which was written by Ronnie Hudson and Mikel Hooks and was itself a reworking of Troutman's 1981 song "So Ruff, So Tuff." In the song where Troutman sings "shake it, shake it baby", he interpolates the chant he used on his 1982 Zapp single, "Dance Floor". The remix version contains a sample taken from Kleeer's 1984 song "Intimate Connection".

== Composition ==
Sheet music for "California Love" shows the key of G minor, and a moderate tempo of 92 beats per minute.

== Critical reception ==
Michael Hill from Cash Box noted that 2Pac and Dr. Dre "are clicking some smooth lyrics together over this killer ass dance track. This track is smoking, and with the introduction of funk royalty Roger Troutman on the talk box, it simply bursts into flames. If you haven't heard one of the six mixes available, be patient because it's bound to reach your area soon." Will Hermes from Entertainment Weekly named it "a West Coast rump shaker". Victoria Segal from Melody Maker wrote, "Vocoders. The squelchiest synths. Slippery background harmonies. Shake it baby. You are in a disco dotted with palm trees, smothered in Gracelands-style soft furnishings and dancing with a coked-out Ray Liotta, looking like hell at the end of Good Fellas. That's 'California Love'."

Pan-European magazine Music & Media noted, "West Coast gangsta rap is about to expire in favour of R&B related tunes and melody (Coolio) in general. 2Pac has decided to take the George Clinton p-funk path with distorted vocals, adventurous keyboard and a deep groove, although the main topic is still concentrated on the mean streets of L.A." Ralph Tee from Music Week's RM Dance Update gave the song four out of five, describing it as "a fusion of funk and hip-hop on this excellent rap cut about the splendour of the US's sunshine state." He added further, "Dr. Dre's production sparkles on this potential hit which takes the vocoder and horns from Zapp's 'So Ruff So Tuff' (Roger Troutman also appearing in the Mad Max-style video) and on its best mix the sticky bassline from Kleeer's 'Intimate Connection' underlines it all."

== Music videos ==
Two versions of the music video were filmed. Shakur's longtime friend, actress Jada Pinkett Smith, came up with the concept inspired by the 1985 film Mad Max Beyond Thunderdome. She was expected to direct the video, but she removed herself from the project and was replaced by Hype Williams. The video was filmed November 10–13, 1995 in El Mirage, California. It takes place in a desert in the year 2095. The casting includes actor Clifton Powell as the party chief "Monster," actor Chris Tucker as his MC, Tony Cox as the dwarf soldier, and Roger Troutman (formerly with the band Zapp) carrying a talk box. It ends with a cliffhanger cut by a "To Be Continued" closing. An alternative version, featuring the remix song re-cut, removes the final caption and features 2Pac and Dr. Dre naming West Coast towns.

The second video is based on the remix version of the song from the album All Eyez on Me and is a continuation of the video's story. The premise is that the desert scenes of the previous videos were merely a nightmare 2Pac was having. When he wakes up, he finds himself in his bed beside a young woman. He calls Dr. Dre on a cordless phone, who tells him to get over to his summer house because he's throwing a house party. The rest of the music video takes place as if it were a home video celebrating 2Pac's welcome to Death Row and features several cameos, notably Roger Troutman who is now playing the piano, and guest appearances from DJ Quik, Big Syke, Deion Sanders, Danny Boy, Nadia Cassini, Jodeci, B-Legit and E-40. The video was shot in Compton, California.

The first video can be found on the DualDisc of All Eyez on Me and the second video can be found on Tupac: Live at the House of Blues DVD. It also won the 1996 MOBO Award for Best Video. The music video was released in December 1995.

== Live performances ==
2Pac performed the song live on January 6, 1996, at Louisiana Superdome in New Orleans during the Tribute to Eazy-E tour. He then performed the song live with Roger Troutman on Saturday Night Live on February 17, 1996. Dr. Dre and Snoop Dogg performed the song during the Super Bowl LVI halftime show on February 13, 2022. Dr. Dre and Kendrick Lamar performed the song at The Pop Out: Ken & Friends show on June 19, 2024. Dr. Dre, Anderson .Paak, and Sheila E. performed the song live on January 30, 2025, at FireAid to help with relief efforts for the January 2025 Southern California wildfires.

== Accolades ==
"California Love" was voted the 11th best single of 1996 in the Pazz & Jop, an annual critics poll run by The Village Voice. Robert Christgau, the poll's creator, ranked it 10th in his own year-end list. The song's first video was nominated for an MTV Video Music Award for Best Rap Video in 1996. It achieved number 9 of the top 10 on MTV's 100 Greatest Videos Ever Made list in 1999. In April 2005 it reached the Bronze medal spot on MTV2 and XXL's 25 Greatest West Coast Videos. It also achieved number 1 on the French MTV's "100 Greatest Rap Music Videos" in 2006. It went number 51 on VH1's countdown of the 100 Greatest songs of the 90s in 2007. In 2009, "California Love" was ranked number 23 on Entertainment Weekly's "The 100 Greatest Summer Songs".

Publication	Country	Accolade	Year	Rank
Ego Trip	United States	Hip Hop's 40 Greatest Singles by Year 1980–98	1999	22
VH1	United States	100 Greatest Songs of the 90's	2007	51
Blender	United States	The 1001 Greatest Songs to Download Right Now!	2003	*
rap.about.com	United States	50 Great Hip Hop Songs	2001	6
Rolling Stone	United States	The 500 Greatest Songs of All Time	2004	346
Bruce Pollock	United States	The 7,500 Most Important Songs of 1944–2000	2005	*
Entertainment Weekly	United States	The 100 Greatest Summer Songs	2009	23
Rolling Stone	United States	The 500 Greatest Songs of All Time (Updated 2010)	2010	355
Rock and Roll Hall of Fame	United States	The Songs That Shaped Rock (Additions 2011)	2011	*
Slant	United States	The 100 Best Singles of the 90s	2011	17
Time	United States	The All-Time 100 Songs	2011	*
Pause & Play	United States	Songs Inducted into a Time Capsule, One Track at Each Week		*
Gary Mulholland	United Kingdom	This Is Uncool: The 500 Best Singles Since Punk Rock	2002	*
Paul Morley	United Kingdom	Words and Music, 210 Greatest Pop Singles of All Time	2003	*
Q	United Kingdom	The 1001 Best Songs Ever	2003	118
Q	United Kingdom	The 1010 Songs You Must Own	2004	*
Giannis Petridis	Greece	2004 of the Best Songs of the Century	2003	*
Technikart	France	Top 20 Songs per Year 1991–2011	2012	13
Village Voice	United States	Singles of the Year		11
Face	United Kingdom	Singles of the Year		3
Melody Maker	United Kingdom	Singles of the Year		24
Vox	United Kingdom	Singles of the Year		8
Rolling Stone	United States	The 500 Greatest Songs of All Time (Updated 2021)	2021	320

== Charts ==
=== Weekly charts ===
Chart (1996)	Peak position
Australia (ARIA)	4
Austria (Ö3 Austria Top 40)	9
Belgium (Ultratop 50 Flanders)	21
Belgium (Ultratop 50 Wallonia)	13
Canada Top Singles (RPM)	51
Canada Dance/Urban (RPM)	1
Denmark (IFPI)	4
Europe (Eurochart Hot 100)	3
Europe (European Dance Radio)	1
Finland (Suomen virallinen lista)	11
France (SNEP)	13
Germany (GfK)	7
Iceland (Íslenski Listinn Topp 40)	7
Ireland (IRMA)	16
Israel (IBA)	10
Italy (Musica e dischi)	1
Italy Airplay (Music & Media)	9
Netherlands (Dutch Top 40)	2
Netherlands (Single Top 100)	7
New Zealand (Recorded Music NZ)	1
Norway (VG-lista)	4
Quebec (ADISQ)	14
Scottish Singles Sales (Official Charts)	12
Sweden (Sverigetopplistan)	1
Sweden (Swedish Dance Chart)	1
Switzerland (Schweizer Hitparade)	7
UK Singles (Official Charts)	6
UK Dance (Official Charts)	5
UK Hip Hop/R&B (Official Charts)	2
UK Club Chart (Music Week)	55
US Billboard Hot 100	1
US Dance Singles Sales (Billboard)	1
US Hot R&B/Hip-Hop Songs (Billboard)	1
US Hot Rap Songs (Billboard)	1
US Pop Airplay (Billboard)	34
US Rhythmic Airplay (Billboard)	2

Chart (2022)	Peak position
Canada Hot 100 (Billboard)	49
Global 200 (Billboard)	77

=== Year-end charts ===
Chart (1996)	Position
Australia (ARIA)	34
Belgium (Ultratop 50 Wallonia)	61
Canada Dance/Urban (RPM)	5
Europe (Eurochart Hot 100)	30
France (SNEP)	77
Germany (Media Control)	50
Israel (IBA)	23
Netherlands (Dutch Top 40)	98
Netherlands (Single Top 100)	100
New Zealand (RIANZ)	11
Sweden (Topplistan)	15
Sweden (Swedish Dance Chart)	2
Switzerland (Schweizer Hitparade)	27
UK Singles (OCC)	87
US Billboard Hot 100	17
US Hot R&B Singles (Billboard)	6
US Hot Rap Singles (Billboard)	1

=== Decade-end charts ===
Chart (1990–1999)	Position
US Billboard Hot 100	97

== Certifications and sales ==
Region	Certification	Certified units/sales
Australia (ARIA)	Gold	35,000^{^}
Canada (Music Canada)	Gold	20,000^{*}
Denmark (IFPI Danmark)	Gold	45,000^{‡}
Germany (BVMI)	Gold	250,000^{‡}
Italy (FIMI) sales since 2009	Gold	50,000^{‡}
New Zealand (RMNZ)	5× Platinum	150,000^{‡}
Norway (IFPI Norway)	Gold	
United Kingdom (BPI)	2× Platinum	1,200,000^{‡}
United States (RIAA) physical	2× Platinum	2,000,000^{^}
United States digital	—	2,404,000
^{*} Sales figures based on certification alone.^{^} Shipments figures based on certification alone.^{‡} Sales+streaming figures based on certification alone.

== Release history ==
Region	Date	Format(s)	Label(s)	Ref.
United States	December 3, 1995	12-inch vinyl; CD; cassette	Death Row; Interscope	
United States	January 30, 1996	Contemporary hit radio	Death Row; Interscope	
Japan	March 25, 1996	CD	Death Row; Interscope; Island	
United Kingdom	April 1, 1996	12-inch vinyl; CD; cassette	Death Row; Interscope; Island	

== See also ==
- List of number-one singles in 1996 (New Zealand)
- List of number-one R&B singles of 1996 (U.S.)
- List of Hot 100 number-one singles of 1996 (U.S.)
- List of number-one singles (Sweden)
- List of number-one hits of 1996 (Italy)
