= List of number-one hits of 1996 (Italy) =

The list of number-one singles of 1996 in Italy includes all the songs that reached the top spot on the weekly chart compiled by the Italian music magazine Musica e Dischi. The oldest music industry publication in Italy, it had published the record chart since 1960, ranking the weekly best-selling singles in the country. The Musica e dischi chart was regularly featured on the Hits of the World section of Billboard magazine in the United States, as well as pan-European music industry publication Music & Media.

== Chart history ==
Week	Single	Artist(s)	Ref.
1	"Gangsta's Paradise"	Coolio featuring L.V.	
2	"Gangsta's Paradise"	Coolio featuring L.V.	
3	"Gangsta's Paradise"	Coolio featuring L.V.	
4	"Children"	Robert Miles	
5	"Children"	Robert Miles	
6	"Children"	Robert Miles	
7	"Children"	Robert Miles	
8	"Children"	Robert Miles	
9	"Children"	Robert Miles	
10	"Children"	Robert Miles	
11	"Children"	Robert Miles	
12	"Children"	Robert Miles	
13	"La terra dei cachi"	Elio e le Storie Tese	
14	"They Don't Care About Us"	Michael Jackson	
15	"California Love"	2pac	
16	"Più bella cosa"	Eros Ramazzotti	
17	"Più bella cosa"	Eros Ramazzotti	
18	"Fastlove"	George Michael	
19	"Fastlove"	George Michael	
20	"Don't Stop Movin'"	Livin' Joy	
21	"Don't Stop Movin'"	Livin' Joy	
22	"Fable"	Robert Miles	
23	"Fable"	Robert Miles	
24	"Fable"	Robert Miles	
25	"Fable"	Robert Miles	
26	"Fable"	Robert Miles	
27	"Fable"	Robert Miles	
28	"Summer Is Crazy"	Alexia	
29	"Killing Me Softly"	Fugees	
30	"Killing Me Softly"	Fugees	
31	"Killing Me Softly"	Fugees	
32	"Killing Me Softly"	Fugees	
33	"What Goes Around Comes Around"	Bob Marley	
34	"What Goes Around Comes Around"	Bob Marley	
35	"What Goes Around Comes Around"	Bob Marley	
36	"Killing Me Softly"	Regina	
37	"Killing Me Softly"	Regina	
38	"Killing Me Softly"	Regina	
39	"Stranger in Moscow"	Michael Jackson	
40	"Born Slippy"	Underworld	
41	"Born Slippy"	Underworld	
42	"Born Slippy"	Underworld	
43	"Born Slippy"	Underworld	
44	"Born Slippy"	Underworld	
45	"Born Slippy"	Underworld	
46	"Born Slippy"	Underworld	
47	"One and One"	Robert Miles and Maria Nayler	
48	"One and One"	Robert Miles and Maria Nayler	
49	"One and One"	Robert Miles and Maria Nayler	
50	"One and One"	Robert Miles and Maria Nayler	
51	"One and One"	Robert Miles and Maria Nayler	
52	"One and One"	Robert Miles and Maria Nayler	
