= Joe Quarterman =

Joe Quarterman (or Sir Joe Quarterman & Free Soul), also known as Sir Joe Quarterman and sometimes misspelled as Joe Quatermain, is an American funk and soul singer. Quarterman earned the title "Sir" in high school. His single, "(I Got) So Much Trouble in My Mind", was also his biggest, reaching the R&B Top 30 in 1973, and was featured on the radio station Master Sounds 98.3 in Grand Theft Auto: San Andreas. After leaving the music industry, Quarterman earned a degree in architecture. His song "I'm Gonna Get You" was later featured on the breakbeat compilation Ultimate Breaks and Beats.

Sir Joe is from Washington D.C., then known as funk land before later being renamed Go-Go land, where the hit maker Chuck Brown and the Soul Searchers were amongst the rival bands that played alongside Sir Joe Quarterman & Free Soul. During the 1970s there were countless bands in the D.C. metro area.

== Discography ==
- Sir Joe Quarterman & Free Soul (1973)
