= Do or Die (Tim Dog album) =

Studio album by Tim Dog
- Released: April 20, 1993
- Recorded: 1992–1993
- Studios: Megafunk; Battery Studios; Matrix Studios (England, UK); Chung King Studios (New York, NY); Studio 4 Recording (Philadelphia)
- Genres: East Coast hip hop; hardcore hip hop
- Length: 50:06
- Labels: Ruffhouse; Columbia
- Producer: Tim Dog

Tim Dog chronology
Penicillin on Wax (1991)	Do or Die (1993)	Big Time (1996)

Singles from Do or Die
- 1. "I Get Wrecked" Released: 1993

Professional ratings
Review scores
Source	Rating
AllMusic	3/5 stars
RapReviews	4/10

Do or Die is the second studio album by American New York-based rapper Tim Dog. It was released in 1993 via Ruffhouse/Columbia, and produced by Tim Dog, Ced Gee, T.R. Love, and Kool Keith of Ultramagnetic MC's. The album represented Tim's shift of focus, away from confrontation with the West Coast and concentrated on hardcore East Coast rap. The album contained a shout-out to Tupac Shakur whom Tim thanked for assisting him when involved in a potentially violent situation when touring in California.

The album peaked at number 53 on the Top R&B/Hip-Hop Albums chart and number 17 on the Heatseekers Albums chart, spawning a single "I Get Wrecked" with KRS-One, which peaked at number 8 on the Hot Rap Songs chart.

== Track listing ==
No.	Title	Producer(s)	Length
1.	"I Don't Give a Fuck"	Tim Dog	4:26
2.	"Grab Your Gat"	Tim Dog; Maurice Mo' Gallegos (co.); Ray Roll (co.); Tony Touch (co.)	4:20
3.	"I Get Wrecked" (featuring KRS-One)	Tim Dog; Moe Love (co.); TR Love (co.)	5:23
4.	"Timberlands"	Tim Dog	4:23
5.	"If I Was a Cop"	Tim Dog	3:45
6.	"Hardcore"	Tim Dog	3:28
7.	"Game (featuring Cool Chuck (uncredited))"	Tim Dog	4:53
8.	"Skip to My Loot" (featuring Smooth B)	Tim Dog	4:24
9.	"Silly Bitch"	Tim Dog	3:47
10.	"Mad Dog"	Tim Dog	4:31
11.	"Make Room"	Tim Dog	2:40
12.	"Breakin' North"	Tim Dog	4:06
Total length:			50:06

== Personnel ==
- Timothy Blair – main artist, producer
- Lawrence Parker – featured artist (track 3)
- Darryl Barnes – featured artist (track 8)
- Maurice Mo' Gallegos – co-producer (track 2)
- Ray Cortez – co-producer (track 2)
- Joseph Anthony Hernandez – co-producer (track 2)
- Maurice Russell Smith – drum programming & co-producer (track 3)
- Trevor Randolph – drum programming & co-producer (track 3)
- Shams – drum programming all beats
- Keith Matthew Thornton – bass & keyboards (track 3)
- Phil Nowlan – bass (track 4)
- Andy "Funky Drummer" Kravitz – drums (track 4)
- Mike Tyler – guitar (track 4)
- Jay Davidson – saxophone (track 5)
- Joseph Mario Nicolo – mixing (tracks: 1, 3–11), additional recording
- Craig Caruth – mixing (tracks: 2, 12), additional recording
- Daymon Warren – mixing (tracks: 2, 12)
- Leo "Swift" Morris – recording
- David Sussman – additional recording
- Kennan Keating – additional recording
- Steve Reece – additional recording
- Tony Dawsey – mastering
- Diane Zaiko – assistant engineering
- Dirk Grobelny – assistant engineering
- Manuel Lecuona – assistant engineering
- Francesca Restrepo – art direction & design
- Gerhard Yurkovic – photography

== Charts ==
Chart (1993)	Peak position
US Top R&B/Hip-Hop Albums (Billboard)	53
US Heatseekers Albums (Billboard)	17
