= DJ Slip =

American record producer

- Born: Terry K. Allen; April 19, 1964 (age 62)
- Genre: West Coast hip-hop
- Occupation: Record producer
- Years active: 1988–present
- Labels: Orpheus; IV Life
- Member of: Compton's Most Wanted; N.O.T.R.

Terry K. Allen, (born April 19, 1964) professionally known as DJ Slip or Don Bolo is an American record producer from Inglewood, California. He is a founding member of gangsta rap groups Compton's Most Wanted, X-Factor, and N.O.T.R., making him one of the pioneers of gangsta rap music.

== Discography ==
=== Solo ===
- 2007: The Minority Report

=== with MC Eiht ===
- 1994: We Come Strapped
- 1996: Death Threatz
- 1997: Last Man Standing
- 2000: N' My Neighborhood ("Git Money" Featuring Techniec and Tha Chill)

=== with Compton's Most Wanted ===
- 1990: It's a Compton Thang
- 1991: Straight Checkn 'Em
- 1992: Music to Driveby
- 2000: Represent
- 2006: Music to Gang Bang
