= Penicillin on Wax =

Studio album by Tim Dog
- Released: November 12, 1991
- Recorded: 1991
- Genres: East Coast hip hop; gangsta rap
- Length: 1:01:44
- Labels: Ruffhouse; Columbia
- Producers: Tim Dog; TR Love; Ced-Gee; Moe Love; Bobby Crawford; Louis Flores

Tim Dog chronology
Penicillin on Wax (1991)	Do or Die (1993)

Singles from Penicillin on Wax
- 1. "Fuck Compton" Released: 1991; 2. "Step to Me" Released: 1991; 3. "Bronx Nigga" Released: 1992

Penicillin on Wax is the debut studio album by American New York-based rapper Tim Dog. It was released on November 12, 1991, via Ruffhouse Records. The album was produced by Tim Dog, Ced-Gee, TR Love and Moe Love from Ultramagnetic MC's, Bobby Crawford, and Louis Flores. Kool Keith made uncredited guest appearances on two tracks.

The album spawned three singles, the infamous underground hit "Fuck Compton" (which disses the N.W.A.), "Step to Me" and "Bronx Nigga". The album peaked at number 155 on the US Billboard 200 chart, number 34 on the Top R&B/Hip-Hop Albums chart, number 4 on the Heatseekers Albums chart.

== Background ==
- A skit called "DJ Quik Beat Down" is a forty-second audio snippet of Tim Dog physically assaulting DJ Quik.
- The track "Step to Me" taunted Compton rappers and included the line "DJ Quik he can suck my dick".
- The track "Goin Wild in the Penile" included an intro whereby Tim had recently been released from prison for shooting a "Compton kid".

== Critical reception ==
Professional ratings
Review scores
Source	Rating
AllMusic	4/5 stars
Entertainment Weekly	C+
RapReviews	7/10
The Village Voice	(choice cut)
The Virgin Encyclopedia of Nineties Music	3/5 stars

Entertainment Weekly writer James Bernard commended Tim's "deep and ominous" vocals for delivering "attention-grabbing moments" at times but felt the album gets weighted down with Tim's lyrical tirades against N.W.A over unspectacular beats, concluding that "Yes, 'dissing' is a proud rap tradition, but such one-note obsession gets pretty boring. Move on, Tim Dog, move on." Robert Christgau cited "Fuck Compton" as a "choice cut", indicating a good song on "an album that isn't worth your time or money." The Washington Post concluded that "the Bronx rapper doesn't realize that for as much as he's dissing NWA on cuts such as '(Expletive) Compton' and 'Intro', he's riding their coattails."

In a retrospective review, DJ Fatboy of RapReviews praised the production, Tim's "forceful" delivery of his absurd lyricism (despite wishing that he craft better lyrics), and Kool Keith's guest contributions on "I Ain't Havin' It" and "Secret Fantasies", concluding that, "Great production values, utter craziness. Although it's debatable whether or not it was Tim's intent to be that fuckin out there, it's no question this was one of the most entertaining albums to come out of the early 90s, point blank." AllMusic's Ron Wynn gave Penicillin on Wax an "Album Pick" tag, saying "Bronx rapper Tim Dog informed the world what he thought of West Coast types with the single 'F--- Compton'. It was the definitive composition on his debut album, setting the stage for a series of angry, often vicious and sneering taunts, challenges, boasts and putdowns."

== Track listing ==
No.	Title	Producer(s)	Length
1.	"Intro"	Tim Dog; TR Love	2:49
2.	"Low Down Nigga"	Tim Dog; Moe Love	2:07
3.	"Robin Harris Shit" (Skit)		0:17
4.	"Fuck Compton"	Tim Dog; Ced-Gee	4:10
5.	"DJ Quick Beat Down" (Skit)		0:20
6.	"Step to Me"	Tim Dog; Bobby Crawford	4:46
7.	"Phone Conversation with Reporter" (Skit)		0:23
8.	"Bronx Nigga"	Tim Dog; TR Love	4:16
9.	"You Ain't Shit"	Tim Dog; Ced-Gee	4:20
10.	"I Ain't Takin' No Shorts"	Tim Dog; Moe Love; TR Love	3:37
11.	"NFL Shit" (Skit)		0:18
12.	"I'll Wax Anybody"	Tim Dog; Moe Love	5:05
13.	"Michel'le Conversation" (Skit)		1:22
14.	"Can't Fuck Around"	Tim Dog; Ced-Gee	3:43
15.	"Dog's Gonna Getcha"	Tim Dog; Bobby Crawford	3:03
16.	"Goin Wild in the Penile"	Tim Dog; Ced-Gee	4:09
17.	"Get Off the Dick"	Tim Dog; Louis Flores	3:11
18.	"I Ain't Havin' It" (featuring Kool Keith (uncredited))	Tim Dog; Moe Love	3:34
19.	"Patriotic Pimp"	Tim Dog; Ced-Gee	3:51
20.	"Secret Fantasies" (featuring Ultramagnetic MCs (Kool Keith and Ced-Gee, both uncredited))	Tim Dog; TR Love	6:21
Total length:			1:01:25

== Personnel ==
- Timothy Blair – main artist, producer
- Keith Matthew Thornton – guest rapper, uncredited(tracks: 18, 20)
- Michael Joseph Tyler – guitar
- Jay Davidson – saxophone
- Andy "Funky Drummer" Kravitz – drums
- Cedric Ulmont Miller – producer (tracks: 4, 9, 14, 16, 19)
- Trevor Randolph – producer (tracks: 1, 8, 10, 20)
- Maurice Russell Smith – producer (tracks: 2, 10, 12, 18)
- Bobby Crawford – producer (tracks: 6, 15)
- Louis Flores – producer (track 17)
- Joseph Mario Nicolo – mixing
- Yuval Kossovsky – assistant engineering
- Francesca Restrepo – art direction & design
- Jesse Frohman – photography

== Charts ==
=== Weekly charts ===
Chart (1991)	Peak position
US Billboard 200	155
US Top R&B/Hip-Hop Albums (Billboard)	34
US Heatseekers Albums (Billboard)	4

=== Year-end charts ===
Chart (1992)	Position
US Top R&B/Hip-Hop Albums (Billboard)	95
