= Music to Driveby =

Studio album by Compton's Most Wanted
- Released: September 29, 1992
- Recorded: May – June 1992
- Studios: Big Beat Soundlabs (Los Angeles, California); Slips X Factor Studios (Inglewood, California)
- Genres: West Coast hip-hop; gangsta rap; G-funk
- Length: 57:29
- Labels: Orpheus; Epic
- Producers: The Unknown DJ; DJ Slip; MC Eiht; Masta Rick Rock; DJ Mike T

Compton's Most Wanted chronology
Straight Checkn 'Em (1991)	Music to Driveby (1992)	Killafornia Organization (1996)

Singles from Music to Driveby
- 1. "Hood Took Me Under" Released: August 20, 1992; 2. "Def Wish II" Released: 1992

Professional ratings
Review scores
Source	Rating
AllMusic	4/5 stars
RapReviews	8/10
The Source	3.5/5 stars

Music to Driveby is the third studio album by American gangsta rap group Compton's Most Wanted. It was released on September 29, 1992, through Orpheus and Epic Records. Recording sessions took place at Big Beat Soundlabs in Los Angeles and at Slips X Factor Studios in Inglewood from May 18 to June 9, 1992. Production was handled by members DJ Slip, MC Eiht and DJ Mike T, as well as The Unknown DJ and Ric Roc. It features contributions from William "Willie Z" Zimmerman on background vocals, keyboards, saxophone and harmonica, EMmage on backing vocals, and guest appearance by Scarface of Geto Boys.

The album peaked at number 66 on the Billboard 200 and at number 20 on the Top R&B/Hip-Hop Albums chart in the United States. Along with the singles, music videos were produced for the songs "Hood Took Me Under" and "Def Wish II".

== Track listing ==
All lyrics are written by Aaron Tyler, except track 9 written with Brad Jordan.

No.	Title	Music	Producer(s)	Length
1.	"Intro"	A. Tyler	DJ Slip; MC Eiht	0:21
2.	"Hit the Floor"	T. Allen	DJ Slip	1:49
3.	"Hood Took Me Under"	M. Bryant	DJ Mike T	3:39
4.	"Jack Mode"	T. Allen	DJ Slip	3:16
5.	"Compton 4 Life"	A. Simon	Master Ric Roc	3:18
6.	"8 Iz Enough"	T. Allen	DJ Slip	2:48
7.	"Duck Sick II"	T. Allen; A. Manuel	DJ Slip	3:43
8.	"Dead Men Tell No Lies"	A. Tyler; T. Allen	DJ Slip; MC Eiht	3:41
9.	"N 2 Deep" (featuring Scarface)	T. Allen; I. Hayes	DJ Slip	3:51
10.	"Who's Fucking Who?"	T. Allen; M. Bryant	DJ Slip; DJ Mike T	1:47
11.	"This Is a Gang"	T. Allen	DJ Slip	3:37
12.	"Hoodrat"	A. Manuel	The Unknown DJ	3:56
13.	"Niggaz Strugglin"	A. Tyler; A. Simon; B. Hillard; M. Garson	MC Eiht; Master Ric Roc	3:31
14.	"I Gots ta Get Over"	A. Simon; A. Johnson; S. Hudman	MC Eiht; Master Ric Roc	3:36
15.	"U's a Bitch"	A. Manuel	The Unknown DJ	3:43
16.	"Another Victim"	A. Manuel; I. Hayes	The Unknown DJ	3:51
17.	"Def Wish II"	A. Manuel	The Unknown DJ	3:32
18.	"Music to Driveby"	A. Manuel	The Unknown DJ	3:31
Total length:				57:29

== Background ==
MC Eight said the reasoning behind the album was specifically created as a soundtrack for drive-by shootings in a 2016 interview with DJ Vlad. "You don't want the mood to be so somber and quiet to where people start second guessing the mission." He claimed that previously gangbangers would listen to old-school funk such as Flashlight by Parliament or Heard it Through the Grapevine by Zapp.

== Personnel ==
- Aaron Tyler – lyrics, vocals, producer (tracks: 1, 8, 13, 14)
- Terry Keith Allen – producer (tracks: 1, 2, 4, 6–11), recording (tracks: 5, 6, 9, 10)
- Michael Bryant – turntables, producer (tracks: 3, 10), arranger (track 5)
- Brad Terrence Jordan – lyrics and vocals (track 9)
- William Fredric Zimmerman – backing vocals, keyboards, saxophone, harmonica
- Emmage – backing vocals (track 15)
- Andre Manuel – producer (tracks: 12, 15–18), executive producer
- Alaric "Rick" Simon – producer (tracks: 5, 13, 14)
- Mike "Webeboomindashit" Edwards – recording, mixing
- Brian Gardner – mastering
- Peter Dokus – art direction, photography
- David Duarte – design

== Charts ==
Chart (1992)	Peak position
US Billboard 200	66
US Top R&B/Hip-Hop Albums (Billboard)	20
