= The Right Stuff Records =

The Right Stuff Records is an American reissue record label that was part of EMI, which is now owned by Universal Music Group and is based out of Santa Monica, California.

The label primarily released classic rock and R&B repertoire which included greatest hits collections, anthologies, boxed sets and compilations. The Right Stuff's repertoire was sourced from the various labels owned by EMI Records and also leased-in labels such as Dick Griffey's SOLAR (the Sound of Los Angeles Records), the post-1976 Philadelphia International Records, Hi Records, Tabu Records and Salsoul Records. The label also owned Leon Russell and Denny Cordell's Shelter Records and the New York–based Laurie Records. The label also created many joint venture projects with outside brands such as Harley-Davidson, Hot Rod Magazine, Shape Magazine, and others. The label was started by former EMI and Capitol Records executive Tom Cartwright.

== Selected artists on reissues ==
- Al Green
- Alexander O'Neal
- Freddie King
- Natalie Cole
- Maze
- Leon Russell
- Tavares
- Rudy Ray Moore
- O'Bryan
- Del Shannon
- The Deele
- First Choice
- Yma Sumac
- Luther Ingram
- The Whispers
- George Clinton
- Bobby Womack
- Carrie Lucas
- Loleatta Holloway
- Dynasty
- Portrait
- Teddy Pendergrass
- Lou Rawls
- Phoebe Snow
- The S.O.S. Band
- Dion DiMucci
- Shalamar
- Compton's Most Wanted
- Roy Harper
- Ringo Starr
