= West Coast Poplock =

Single by Ronnie Hudson and the Street People
- Released: 1982
- Recorded: 1982 (Hollywood, California)
- Genre: Funk
- Length: 5:18
- Label: Birdie
- Songwriters: Mikel Hooks, Ronald Hudson, Larry Troutman, Roger Troutman
- Producers: Ronnie Hudson, Mikel Hooks

"West Coast Poplock" is one of the most popular singles by Ronnie Hudson and the Street People and was released in 1982. Immediately adopted as an anthem by KDAY, "West Coast Poplock" has rarely left radio since its release nearly 40 years ago. It contains elements from the 1981 song "So Ruff, So Tuff", performed by Roger Troutman and co-written by himself and brother Larry Troutman. Various rappers have sampled it, from N.W.A, Snoop Dogg and Dr. Dre to Scarface and Mos Def. The song is notable for its sample in "California Love" by 2Pac featuring Dr. Dre and Roger Troutman, which was released on Death Row Records record label in 1996. Ronnie Hudson made a comeback with his album entitled Westcoastin', in which the "West Coast Poplock" was renamed to "West Coast Poplock 2020" and was re-mastered.

== Legacy ==
West Coast Poplock was later sampled by Dr. Dre & 2Pac on "California Love". Hudson's work is featured in films including The Social Network, South Central, Chef & House Party, and various TV shows and video games such as Grand Theft Auto San Andreas.

To take advantage of the record's popularity, a second release for the American east coast was issued, with a new vocal performance referencing places such as New Jersey and Baltimore.

The song also appears briefly in the biopic Michael, in the scene where Michael Jackson recruits the gangsters for the music video for "Beat It".

== Cultural references ==
In the song's lyrics, upscale car brands are mentioned: "Poplocking in Rolls-Royce, Cadillac, Lincoln and Mercedes-Benz", along with notable hotel chains: "Poplocking in Howard Johnson, Sheraton, poplocking at the Holiday Inn".

== California Love ==
The single "California Love" by 2Pac, Dr. Dre and Roger Troutman is the best-known song and most successful to sample "West Coast Poplock", reaching number one on the Billboard Hot 100 for two weeks. The chorus, "California knows how to party", was sung by Roger Troutman using his characteristic talk box and was taken from "West Coast Poplock."

== Track listing ==
12"

No.	Title	Length
1.	"West Coast Poplock" (Part 1 / Vocal)	5:18
2.	"West Coast Poplock" (Part 2 / Instrumental)	5:18

== In popular culture ==
- In 2013, Death Row Records former artist, Daz Dillinger, covered and freestyled on the song "West Coast Poplock" for his new mixtape entitled "Bacc 2 The Old School Vol.1".

== Song samples ==
=== Sample credits ===
The song contains two samples below.

Song	Artist	Year
So Ruff, So Tuff	Roger & Zapp	1981
Disco Boot-Leg	Booker T. & the M.G.'s	1965

=== Sample use ===
The song has been sampled many times, including below.

Song	Artist	Year
"California Love"	2pac, Dr. Dre and Roger Troutman	1995
"Nuthin' but a 'G' Thang"	Dr. Dre, Snoop Dogg	1992
"Straight Outta Compton"	N.W.A	1988
"Habitat"	Mos Def	1999
"Kalifornia"	Mos Def	2003
"Southside: Houston, Texas"	Scarface, Devin the Dude and Tela	1998
"8 Ball" (Remix) by N.W.A (1988)	N.W.A	1988
"Pop Lockin' II"	West Coast Bad Boyz	2001
"West Coast Rap"	Afroman	2004
"Do You Wanna Go to the Liquor Store"	Toddy Tee, Mix Master Spade	1988
"Gangster Ass Anthony"	Felt	2005
"Genius Is Back"	Mix Master Spade and Compton Posse	1988
"Califa Funk"	Proper Dos	1998
"Roll on Em"	Crazy Toones, WC, Xzibit, MC Ren and Young Maylay	2006
"On the West"	Cisco Kidd, T.C.	2012
"Standing on the Corner"	DV3	1986
"Cali's All That"	Def Jef	1991
"Dis Is How It Should Be Done"	Candyman	1989
"Nobody's Identical"	Legion of Doom	1989
"Nuthing but Props"	Shug	1996

== Song appearances ==
Album(s)

- 2014: Ronnie Hudson - Westcoastin' (Re-mastered)

Compilation album(s)

- 1983: Victor & The Glove - Breakmixer (Part 1)
- 1991: Various - Lowrider Soundtrack Volume 2
- 1992: Various - West Coast Rap - The First Dynasty, Vol. 2
- 1992: Various - South Central (Music From The Original Motion Picture Soundtrack)
- 1993: Various - Compton's Greatest Rap Volume 1
- 1994: Various - Old School Volume 5
- 1995: Various - Eazy-E & Posse
- 1996: Various - Street Jams : Back 2 The Old Skool Part Three
- 1997: Various - The Best Of Old School Funk Vol. 02
- 1997: Various - West Coast Posse 2
- 1998: Various - Funky Break Essentials 2
- 2002: Various - Old School Funkin' Hip Hop 2
- 2002: Various - Hip Hop Most Wanted - Chapter 2
- 2004: Various - Grand Theft Auto: San Andreas: Official Soundtrack
- 2004: Various - Grand Theft Auto San Andreas: Official Soundtrack Box Set
- 2005: Various - The 2Pac Collection
- 2006: DJ Riz - Live From Brooklyn, Volume 2 (A Side)
- 2008: Various - Old School Jams 8
- 2008: Various - Gold Digging - As Sampled By 2Pac
- 2008: DJ Git Hyper - DJ Git Hyper Presents Music From Raymann Is Laat!

== See also ==
- Grand Theft Auto: San Andreas soundtrack
- The Social Network
