= Ronnie Hudson =

American rapper

- Born: Ronald Hudson; February 4, 1957 (age 69); Washington, D.C., U.S.
- Origin: Los Angeles, California, U.S.
- Genres: Funk, hip-hop, electro
- Occupations: Rapper, producer, bassist
- Instruments: Vocals, drums, keyboards, drum machine, sampler, bass
- Years active: 1974–present
- Labels: Rappers Rapp Records, iWest Entertainment
- Website: ronniehudson.com

Ronald Hudson (born February 4, 1957) is an American artist, bassist, composer and record producer. He is notable for the hit song "West Coast Poplock", which was later sampled in Dr. Dre and Tupac Shakur's song entitled "California Love".

== Early life ==
Raised in Washington, D.C., Hudson began developing his craft at the age of sixteen, playing bass in the band of his friend and mentor Charles Harrington. He eventually started his own band, Chapter One, with Al Johnson, after playing with Chuck Brown and the Soul Searchers. He later moved to Memphis, Tennessee, to become one of Stax Records' recording bassists. At Stax Records, he recorded and toured with Isaac Hayes on his Grammy-winning soundtrack for the 1970s hit movie Shaft, and multi-platinum Black Moses. He also recorded and co-produced songs with Rufus Thomas on "Breakdown", and Luther Ingram on "If (Loving you is wrong I don't want to be right)".

== Career ==
Hudson went on to work in the hip hop genre, probably being best known for his multi-platinum recording, "West Coast Poplock". Many artists have sampled this song, including Dr. Dre and 2pac with "California Love" and Snoop Dogg with "Poplock 2". The track consists of a three-man horn section, upright piano, guitar, percussion, and drums, with Hudson on the bass guitar.

=== 1982: "West Coast Poplock" ===
"West Coast Poplock" is one of the most popular singles by Ronnie Hudson and the Street People and was released in 1982. The song was featured in Grand Theft Auto: San Andreas in the fictional radio station Bounce FM. Immediately adopted as an anthem by KDAY, "West Coast Poplock" has rarely left radio since its release 43 years ago. It has been sampled by N.W.A, Snoop Dogg, Dr. Dre, Scarface and Mos Def. The song is notable for its sample in Dr. Dre's and 2pac's song "California Love", which was released on Death Row Records label in 1995. It was later recorded and sampled by Dr. Dre & 2Pac as "California Love". Both quickly became undisputed West Coast anthems by KDAY. Hudson's work is featured in films including The Social Network, Iron Man 2, and South Central, and the video game Grand Theft Auto San Andreas. While at Stax Records, he recorded and toured with Isaac Hayes on his Grammy-winning soundtrack for the 1970s hit movie Shaft.

Hudson made a comeback with his album Westcoastin', in which "West Coast Poplock" was remastered and renamed "West Coast Poplock 2020".

=== 2014: Hudson presents Westcoastin – EP ===
Hudson's debut album was Westcoastin. The Westcoastin' album features Snoop Dogg, Too Short, E-40, B-Legit, Zapp Troutman, Rappin' 4-Tay, Celly Cel, Wyclef Jean, Suga Free, Lil Frost, J. Black, DJ Battlecat and was produced by West Coast rap producers, including The Real Richie Rich, Lee "DJ Flash" Johnson and Larry "Captain Rapp" Glenn as the album's executive producers.

== Discography ==
Album(s)

- 2014: Ronnie Hudson – Westcoastin' (Re-mastered)

Single(s)

- 1982: West Coast Poplock (with the Street People)

Compilation album(s)

- 1983: Victor & The Glove – Breakmixer (Part 1)
- 1991: Various – Lowrider Soundtrack Volume 2
- 1992: Various – West Coast Rap – The First Dynasty, Vol. 2
- 1992: Various – South Central (Music From The Original Motion Picture Soundtrack)
- 1993: Various – Compton's Greatest Rap Volume 1
- 1994: Various – Old School Volume 5
- 1995: Various – Eazy-E & Posse
- 1996: Various – Street Jams : Back 2 The Old Skool Part Three
- 1997: Various – The Best of Old School Funk Vol. 02
- 1997: Various – West Coast Posse 2
- 1998: Various – Funky Break Essentials 2
- 2002: Various – Old School Funkin' Hip Hop 2
- 2002: Various – Hip Hop Most Wanted – Chapter 2
- 2004: Various – Grand Theft Auto: San Andreas: Official Soundtrack
- 2004: Various – Grand Theft Auto San Andreas: Official Soundtrack Box Set
- 2005: Various – The 2Pac Collection
- 2006: DJ Riz – Live From Brooklyn, Volume 2 (A Side)
- 2008: Various – Old School Jams 8
- 2008: Various – Gold Digging – As Sampled By 2Pac
- 2008: DJ Git Hyper – DJ Git Hyper Presents Music From Raymann Is Laat!

- Ronnie Hudson's discography at Discogs

== Filmography ==
=== Soundtracks ===
- 2010: The Social Network (performer: "West Coast Poplock"), (writer: "West Coast Poplock")
- 2010: Iron Man 2 (writer: "California Love" (Single Version))
- 2010: Valentine's Day (writer: "California Love")
- 2013: That Music Show (TV Series) (writer – 1 episode, 2005 vs. 1995), (writer: "California Love" – uncredited)

=== Actor ===
- 2013: California Dreamers (as Ronnie 'GEE')

== See also ==
- West Coast Poplock
- California Love
- Grand Theft Auto: San Andreas soundtrack
