= Represent (Compton's Most Wanted album) =

Studio album by Compton's Most Wanted
- Released: October 24, 2000
- Recorded: 2000
- Genre: West Coast hip hop; gangsta rap
- Length: 1:03:43
- Label: Half-Ounce Records
- Producer: MC Eiht (also exec.); DJ Slip; Raw Steele

Compton's Most Wanted chronology
Killafornia Organization (1996)	Represent (2000)	Music to Gang Bang (2006)

Professional ratings
Review scores
Source	Rating
AllMusic	2.5/5 stars
The Encyclopedia of Popular Music	2/5 stars

Represent (stylized in all caps and quotemarks) is the fourth studio album by American gangsta rap group Compton's Most Wanted. It was released on October 24, 2000, via Half-Ounce Records. Production was handled by DJ Raw Steele and CMW members DJ Slip and MC Eiht. It includes the singles, "This Is Compton 2000" and "Then U Gone". In 2007, MC Eiht re-released the album re-titled, Representin'. The cover art pays tribute to the N.W.A album Straight Outta Compton.

== Track listing ==
No.	Title	Length
1.	"Intro"	1:02
2.	"This Is Compton 2000"	4:14
3.	"Some May Know"	4:36
4.	"Get Money"	4:27
5.	"What U Like It Like"	4:32
6.	"100%"	2:43
7.	"Then U Gone"	3:54
8.	"All Around the Hood"	3:55
9.	"Endolude - Welcome to Los Angeles"	0:44
10.	"Them Niggaz"	3:50
11.	"So Don't Go There"	4:13
12.	"Represent"	2:30
13.	"Like Me"	4:08
14.	"Pull the Trigger"	4:32
15.	"Slang My Keys"	4:22
16.	"Front Page"	10:01
Total length:		1:03:43
