= Jesse Frohman =

American photographer

Jesse Frohman is a photographer who lives and works in New York City.

== Career ==
Studying economics at the University of Michigan, Frohman discovered his passion for photography. With no formal training, he decided to try photography as a career and was hired by the photographer Irving Penn.

He has worked for magazines such as Vanity Fair, Vogue, Bazaar, V magazine, The New York Times Magazine, Interview, Rolling Stone, Spin, and i-D.

Advertising clients have included Barneys, Estée Lauder, Clinique, Levi's, Lucky Strike, Coty, The Limited, Sony, Geffen Records and Volvo.

== Bibliography ==
=== Books ===
- Frohman, Jesse (2014). Kurt Cobain : the last session. Contributions by Jon Savage and Glenn O'Brien. London: Thames & Hudson.

=== Interviews ===
- Bulley, Jenny (December 2014). "Kurt Cobain's last photo session and interview, 1993 : part 2 'Something to treasure'". What Goes On!. Mojo. 253: 32.
