= Music to Gang Bang =

Studio album by Compton's Most Wanted with MC Eiht
- Released: June 13, 2006
- Genre: West Coast hip hop; gangsta rap
- Length: 1:00:37
- Label: B-Dub Records
- Producer: Mr. Capone-E (exec.); Mr. Criminal; Fingazz

Compton's Most Wanted chronology
Represent (2000)	Music to Gang Bang (2006)	MC Eiht Along with CMW "Presents" Compton's OG (2006)

Professional ratings
Review scores
Source	Rating
AllMusic	3.5/5 stars

Music to Gang Bang is the fifth studio album by American gangsta rap group Compton's Most Wanted (labeled as Compton's Most Wanted with MC Eiht). It was released on June 13, 2006 through B-Dub Records with distribution by Universal Music. Production was handled entirely by Mr. Criminal, except for one track produced by Fingazz. It features guest appearances from Mr. Criminal and Stomper (Soldier Ink). The album contained four singles: "Music to Gang Bang", "Still a Menace", "Come Ride with Me" and "We Get Down Like That".

== Track listing ==
No.	Title	Length
1.	"Intro - Compton"	1:16
2.	"Still a Menace"	3:40
3.	"Music to Gang Bang" (featuring Mr. Criminal)	3:16
4.	"Ain't Thinkin About You"	4:01
5.	"Hood Ratz"	0:39
6.	"Shes Still a Rat"	3:54
7.	"Come Ride with Me"	3:43
8.	"Gangsta Biznezz"	4:04
9.	"Radio Skit"	2:03
10.	"We Them Gangstaz"	4:31
11.	"Compton Compton"	3:46
12.	"We Get Down Like That"	4:41
13.	"We Putz in Work"	3:56
14.	"Gots to Get High"	3:49
15.	"Late Night Hype 3" (featuring Stomper (Soldier Ink))	4:01
16.	"Outro - Compton"	1:24
17.	"Mega Mix"	5:16
Total length:		1:00:37
