= Compton's Most Wanted =

American hip hop group

- Compton's Most Wanted. MC Eiht, Tha Chill, Boom Bam, DJ Mike T and DJ Slip

Background information
- Also known as: C.M.W.
- Origin: Compton, California, U.S.
- Genres: West Coast hip-hop; gangsta rap; G-funk
- Works: Discography
- Years active: 1987–present
- Labels: Kru Cut; City Fresh; Techno Hop; Orpheus; EMI; Epic; Qwest; Half Ounce; B Dub; Startin' from Skratch
- Members: MC Eiht; Tha Chill; Boom Bam; DJ Slip; The Unknown DJ
- Past members: DJ Mike T (deceased)
- Website: cmwgang.com; wcskratchgang.com

Compton's Most Wanted (C.M.W.) is an American gangsta rap group and part of the early West Coast hip-hop scene. The leaders of the group are MC Eiht and Tha Chill.

== History ==
=== Formation and early years ===
C.M.W. included rappers MC Eiht, Tha Chill, DJ Mike T, and producers DJ Slip and The Unknown DJ.

In the mid-1980s, founding members Tha Chill and MC Eiht were writing raps and recording demo tapes (also called "hood tapes") in their spare time while still being involved in gang activity in their neighborhood in Compton, CA. Tha Chill and MC Eiht chose to leave that street corner scene in Compton and start making money in a legit way when they saw their long time friend MC Ren of the multi platinum West Coast hip hop group N.W.A started to create a street buzz in the Los Angeles County area by releasing records along with Arabian Prince, Dr. Dre, Ice Cube, DJ Yella and Eazy-E. In 1987, while in Compton, The Unknown DJ was given one of these "hood tapes" by a friend and became interested in the style and rhyme schemes of the "Compton's Most Wanted" rap group. The Unknown DJ then took the "hood tape" to DJ Slip in Gardena, a city just west of Compton, who at the time was the owner of Los Angeles County's largest DJ Rental business called "Music People - DJ4HIRE".

In 1988, Compton's Most Wanted, under the production leadership of Terry "DJ Slip" Allen, recorded their 1st ever professional songs called Rhymes To Funky. It was one of the many featured songs on the "Sound Control Mob - Under Investigation" Compton compilation album on "Kru Cut / City Fresh Records", along with artist like: "Vanilla C", "PG 13" and "MC Looney Tunes A.K.A. MC Loon E Toons". This label was owned by Compton, CA. Executive producers Alonzo Williams A.K.A. "Grandmaster Lonz' of the World Class Wreckin' Crew and Charles Turner.

In 1989, C.M.W. released their first single "This Is Compton" b/w "Give It Up" and "I Give Up Nothin'" (pt. 1) on The Unknown DJ Los Angeles-based record label Techno Hop Records. Techno Hop Records label was primarily an Electro genre label, but thru the futuristic mind of The Unknown DJ, he single-handedly launched the legendary west coast gangsta rap genre with songs by Ice-T "6 In The Mornin'" and King Tee "Ya Better Bring A Gun" featuring Mixmaster Spade. In the middle of recording this maxi single "This Is Compton" b/w "Give It Up" and "I Give Up Nothin'" managing misunderstanding started to occur between DJ Ant Capone who, along with his father "Old Man Conway", were acting managers for C.M.W. on the "Sound Control Mob - Under Investigation" (Compton Compilation album) and The Unknown DJ. Soon after DJ Ant Capone choose to leave the group.

In 1990, C.M.W. released their first album, It's a Compton Thang on Orpheus Records. It contained the hit single and video "One Time Gaffled Em Up". It's a Compton Thang was entirely produced by DJ Slip and The Unknown DJ and all song lyrics were written by MC Eiht. During the recording of this album Tha Chill was arrested for joy riding, but was released a few weeks later on time served and finished recording his remaining verses on the songs of the album. The album peaked at number 132 in the U.S. chart.

A year later in 1991, the group C.M.W. released their 2nd album, Straight Checkn 'Em, which featured popular hits songs like "Growin' Up In tha Hood", "Driveby Miss Daisy", "Compton's Lynchin'", and the first version of the "Def Wish" series.. "Growin' Up In The Hood" was also released on Warner Bros for the John Singleton block buster movie Boyz n the Hood starring Ice Cube, Cuba Gooding Jr., Laurence Fishburne, Nia Long and Morris Chestnut. During the recording of this album Tha Chill once again was arrested and this time sent to prison. This altercation had happened some months before the album was released and Tha Chill did not have the chance to participate on any of the other songs recordings, except for the original album version of "Growin' Up In the Hood". However, the album Straight Check'n Em was a bigger success than their previous album, peaking at number 92 in the U.S. chart.

Again in 1992, the group released their third and most successful studio album, Music to Driveby. It featured the single "Hood Took Me Under" which the original song was produced by DJ Mike T and the remix single and video version by DJ Slip. This song charted at number 5 in U.S. The "Hood Took Me Under" album version was also featured years later in 2004 on the popular PlayStation 2 video game Grand Theft Auto: San Andreas radio station, Radio Los Santos and in 2005 for Microsoft Windows and Xbox. MC Eiht also has a voice role on one of the game characters "Ryder". The album charted at number 66 in the U.S. U.S. chart. C.M.W. are known especially for their slow, often melancholic raps, using samples from 1970s soul and funk records such as "Joy" and "Walk On By" by Isaac Hayes and "Love T.K.O." by Teddy Pendergrass. They are also known for using movie samples such as "Scareface" and "Deep Cover". Freestyle keyboardist, saxophone and harmonica player Willie Zimmerman, though not officially a member, is used extensively on songs Drive By Miss Daisy, Def Wish, Niggaz Strugglin, U's A Bitch, and Hood Rat.

On the Music To Driveby album , the song "Who's Fucking Who" (produced by DJ Mike T and DJ Slip) disses rapper Timothy "Tim Dog" Blair from the South Bronx. This whole altercation had begun while C.M.W. was on their album promotional tour for Straight Checkn' Em in 1990. While at a Sony music release party for all the labels under the Sony Corporation. Epic Records Compton's Most Wanted and Columbia Records Tim Dog were at the party. C.M.W. met Tim Dog and he explained his reasons for recording the "Fuck Compton" song saying it was a personal beef against N.W.A's Dr. Dre for an altercation with television personality Dee Barnes from the rap video show Pump It Up. Tim Dog felt that since Dee Barnes was born in New York City he had to address the issue represent all New Yorkers in some type of way . He also stated that he didn't like jheri curls and he also hated R&B singer Michel'le's voice. But all that changed while taking pictures when Tim Dog asked members DJ Mike T and MC Eiht to spread a message to all Compton and West Coast hip hop rappers that "he was accepting all diss records and he wanted to start a U.T.F.O. style of dissing like the "Roxanne Roxanne" era. DJ Mike T got infuriated by the gimmick approach, knowing that the East Coast–West Coast hip-hop rivalry was about to boil over and Tim Dog’s rhyme style was getting outdated in New York by their next generation of rap. Back on the West Coast, DJ Mike T had to convince MC Eiht to write a song because Eiht already knew that Tim Dog was already irrelevant with his one hit wonder “Fuck Compton”. C.M.W. released their 2nd single “Def Wish II" dissing well-known Compton rapper DJ Quik, who was a Tree Top Piru (TTP). MC Eiht’s fellow gang members from Tragniew Park convinced him that Quik made a lowkey diss in a controversial statement on his underground tape The Red Tape prior to his signing with Profile Records. "Def Wish II" along with "Another Victim”, “Dead Men Tell No Lies”, “U's A Bitch”, “Hood Rat", were the last five songs ever produced again by The Unknown DJ for Compton's Most Wanted, before being relieved of his production contract from Epic Records for sub selling MC Eiht writers publishing, misdirecting funds and covering it up in a fraudulent business tax write-off. It was the last album C.M.W. released before their long hiatus.

Finally, after a break of eight years, C.M.W. released Represent in 2000 on the independent record label Half Ounce Records Inc. owned by MC Eiht, Boom Bam and deceased rapper Bird from Lil Hawk and Bird. The album featured the single "This Is Compton 2000" and "Some May Know", but did not achieve the success of their previous albums.

In 2006, C.M.W. released Music to Gang Bang on B Dub Records, which contained four singles, most notably the single titled "Music to Gang Bang", with original member MC Eiht and newest members "Big 2Da Boy and Diamond Rich". However the album was not as commercially successful as previous releases.

In 2008, Compton rapper The Game revealed in an interview that he was in talks with MC Eiht to revive the group; however, this has yet to materialize.

DJ Mike T died in January 2026.

=== Solo careers ===
By serving over 2 years in prison Tha Chill had missed recording on two of C.M.W. biggest albums Straight Checkn 'Em and Music to Driveby. So MC Eiht had a better plan to revamp Tha Chill’s rapping career and choose to connect him with Compton rapper and fellow gang brother Boom Bam to form the group Niggas On The Run. Tha Chill agreed with MC Eiht plan and began to tour with C.M.W. opening up for all their shows with songs from N.O.T.R. In 1994, the N.O.T.R. rap album was shelved after the short release and member Tha Chill rejoined C.M.W. along with Boom Bam. Tha Chill had never let making a few mistakes in life shorten his goals on becoming a respected artist. Knowing how to play the drums at an early age he ventured in producing and started recording songs for MC Eiht, MC Ren, Compton rapper C.P.O., Kokane, Jayo Felony, Killafornia Organization, Wanted Gang, Chillafornia, 1st Generation rap group King Tee, Kurupt, MC Eiht, Jayo Felony, producers Battlecat and Sir Jinx, Diirty OG'z with Kurupt, Tray Dee and Weasel Loc and the list goes on. Tha Chill is due any day in 2017 to release his solo album "4 Wit 80" written and produced by himself with some features of many popular artist and of all the original Compton's Most Wanted members: MC Eiht, DJ Slip and DJ Mike T.

After "Music To Driveby", MC Eiht had three albums left under contract with Epic Records and decided to pursue a solo career, as he had already written the lyrics for all three C.M.W. previous albums. In 1994, MC Eiht debut solo album We Come Strapped featuring C.M.W. which was certified 'Gold' after selling over 500,000 copies. In 1995, he released his second solo album Death Threatz featuring C.M.W. In 1996 MC Eiht released his third and last album on Epic Records, Last Man Standing, to finish out the five-album deal with them. In 1997 and 1998, MC Eiht signed to Mack 10 Ho Bangin Records and released "Thicker Than Water" title song for the blockbuster movie, Thicker Than Water and recorded two albums, Section 8 and N' My Neighborhood. In the public's eye MC Eiht is an underrated artist for the fact he has released a solo album, song features with popular artist such as: 2004 Snoop Dogg "Wet Like Candy" on the album Blue Carpet Treatment, 2004 and 2006 MC Eiht released collaboration album with Spice 1 "The Pioneers" and "Keep It Gangsta" and Brotha Lynch Hung "The New Season", 2010 first Generation rap group with west coast artist King Tee, Kurupt, Tha Chill, Jayo Felony, producers Sir Jinx and Battlecat. "Sharks In The Water", "Killin' Me Softly" and "Whole World Spends" and 2012 Kendrick Lamar "M.A.A.D City" and various mixtapes every year since 1994 except for 2008, 2011 and 2016, where he stayed either working on tour or recording studio songs with himself and other artist. In 2016 MC Eiht recorded a feature on a young Compton rapper album known as Problem produced by DJ Quik which is soon to be released. In 2017 MC Eiht has joined forces with DJ Premier of Gangstarr and recorded his solo album Which Way Is West, with features by Tha Chill, "Young Maylay", "Dub C" of the Westside Connection and many more.

Since the formation of Compton's Most Wanted in 1989, DJ Mike T was also known as one of the most top rated DJ's in the Los Angeles club scene. He worked in all the most popular dance spots in the Hollywood and Downtown areas for a promotional company known as Diamond Productions. In 1991, Diamond Productions had teamed up with R&B and hip hop singing group Bell, Biv, DeVoe and created an epic club era in the Los Angeles area called "Mental Mondays" with music provided by DJ Mike T. DJ Mike T has also produced songs for artist that were featured on DJ Slip "Sound Control Mob - Under Investigation (Compton compilation)" album. Such as: 1990, Vanilla C A.K.A. Ms. Vee and The Flava System song "Pump It" on Thump Records. 1990, PG 13 song "Childs Play" on the Rollin' Wit Da PG executive produced by The Unknown DJ on Quality Records. MC Eiht also had a feature on "Young Riders" and written a few songs on this album as well. 1991, DJ Mike T produced 3 songs on the "Compton Cartel - Back In The Hood" for "MC Looney Tunes A.K.A. Loon E Toons" song Lets Get Hype, "MC Shaheed" song Addressing The Blackman and "MC T Bear song Non Believers on Par Records. 1993, MC Loon E Toons and DJ Mike Tee "Inglewoodz Finast" (EP) on Power Move Records. 1996, "Flamin' Compilation" album with the songs by the Crenshaw Mafias with their song titled "Crenshaw Mafia" and Lil Hawk song "Crabs Keep On Slippin" on Triple X Records in the US and Dolphin Entertainment in Japan. Currently DJ Mike T A.K.A. "DJ Mike TzLee" is working from his home studio producing and DJing on mixtapes "Startin' Frum Skratch Studio" under the W.C. Skratch Gang production team.

DJ Slip subleased part of Cherokee Studios in the Fairfax, Los Angeles area and opened up "X Factor Studios" where he recorded popular Los Angeles rappers such as 1995, I Smooth 7 debut album Ghetto Life with songs produced by himself and others like DJ Battle Catt and DJ Fat Jack and scratching by DJ Mike T. Also in 1995, DJ Slip also recorded and mixed MC Eiht's second solo album Death Threatz. In 2001 DJ Slip started working for an Independent studio/label West Coast hip hop IV Life Records.

== Discography ==
=== Studio albums ===
- It's a Compton Thang (1990)
- Straight Checkn 'Em (1991)
- Music to Driveby (1992)
- Represent (2000)
- Music to Gang Bang (2006)
- Gangsta Bizness (2019)

=== Collaboration albums ===
- Killafornia Organization with Killafornia Organization (1996)

=== Compilation albums ===
- When We Wuz Bangin' 1989–1999: The Hitz (2001)
