= Orpheus Music =

- Distributor: Sumthing Distribution
- Genre: R&B, jazz
- Country of origin: U.S.
- Official website: www.orpheusent.com

Orpheus Music is an independent record label that is part of Hush Management and is dedicated to R&B and jazz music, and home of recording artist Freddie Jackson. For years, it was distributed by EMI.

== Roster ==
- Eric Gable
- Freddie Jackson
- Meli'sa Morgan
- Vlad
- Compton's Most Wanted
- Melba Moore
- Najee
- Robin Trower

== See also ==
- List of record labels
