= MC Eiht discography =

Rapper

- Studio albums: 17
- Extended plays: 1
- Music videos: 18
- Collaborative albums: 3
- Mixtapes: 3

The discography of MC Eiht, an American rapper, consists of 18 studio albums, 3 collaborative albums, 1 extended play and 3 mixtapes.

== Albums ==
=== Studio albums ===
List of studio albums, with selected chart positions, and certifications
Title	Album details	Peak chart positions		Certifications
Title	Album details	US	US R&B	Certifications
We Come Strapped	Released: July 19, 1994; Label: Epic Street; Format: CD, LP, cassette, digital download	5	1	RIAA: Gold
Death Threatz	Released: April 2, 1996; Label: Epic Street; Format: CD, LP, cassette, digital download	16	3	
Last Man Standing	Released: November 11, 1997; Label: Epic Street; Format: CD, LP, cassette, digital download	64	13	
Section 8	Released: June 8, 1999; Label: Hoo-Bangin', Priority; Format: CD, LP, cassette, digital download	54	5	
N' My Neighborhood	Released: June 20, 2000; Label: Hoo-Bangin', Priority; Format: CD, LP, cassette, digital download	95	23	
Tha8t'z Gangsta	Released: May 8, 2001; Label: Half Ounce; Format: CD, cassette, digital download	—	75	
Underground Hero	Released: July 2, 2002; Label: D3; Format: CD, digital download	—	54	
Hood Arrest	Released: June 2, 2003; Label: Lookin' Up; Format: CD, digital download	—	—	
Smoke in tha City	Released: September 14, 2004; Label: Factor House; Format: CD, digital download	—	—	
Veterans Day	Released: September 28, 2004; Label: Native; Format: CD, digital download	—	70	
Affiliated	Released: April 4, 2006; Label: Paid in Full; Format: CD, digital download	—	—	
Compton's O.G.	Released: October 10, 2006; Label: PMC; Format: CD, digital download	—	—	
Which Way Iz West	Released: June 30, 2017; Label: Year Round, Blue Stamp; Format: CD, LP, digital download	—	—	
Official	Released: March 14, 2020; Label: Blue Stamp; Format: CD, digital download	164	—	
Lessons	Released: September 18, 2020; Label: Blue Stamp; Format: CD, digital download	—	—	
Revolution in Progress	Released: April 19, 2022; Label: Blue Stamp; Format: CD, digital download	—	—	
Lessons 2	Released: May 5, 2023; Label: Blue Stamp; Format: CD, digital download	—	—	

=== Collaborative albums ===
List of collaborative albums, with selected chart positions
Title	Album details	Peak chart positions
Title	Album details	US R&B
The Pioneers (with Spice 1)	Released: June 29, 2004; Label: Real Talk; Format: CD, digital download	71
The New Season (with Brotha Lynch Hung)	Released: January 24, 2006; Label: Real Talk; Format: CD, digital download	81
Keep It Gangsta (with Spice 1)	Released: February 21, 2006; Label: Real Talk; Format: CD, digital download	—

== Extended plays ==
List of extended plays, with year released
Title	EP details
Keep It Hood	Released: January 4, 2013; Label: Blue Stamp; Format: Digital download

== Mixtapes ==
List of mixtapes, with year released
Title	Mixtape details
All Starz and Strapz	Released: 2009; Label: Self-released; Format: Digital download
All Starz and Strapz Vol. 2	Released: April 23, 2010; Label: Self-released; Format: Digital download
All Starz and Strapz Vol. 3	Released: August 17, 2012; Label: Self-released; Format: Digital download

== Charting singles ==
Single	Year	Chart positions			Album
Single	Year	Hot 100	U.S. R&B	U.S. Rap	Album
"Streiht Up Menace"	1993	72	46	30	Menace II Society
"Automatic"	1999	–	62	6	Section 8

== Guest appearances ==
List of non-single guest appearances, with other performing artists, showing year released and album name
Title	Year	Other artist(s)	Album
"You Don't Work, U Don't Eat"	1991	WC and the Maad Circle, Coolio, Ice Cube, J-Dee	Ain't a Damn Thang Changed
"I Got Pulled Over"	1992	Kid Frost, A.L.T.	East Side Story
"Streiht Up Menace"	1993	—N/a	Menace II Society (soundtrack)
"The Murda Show"	1993	Spice 1	187 He Wrote
"Aiiight Chill..."	1994	Gang Starr, Nas	Hard to Earn
"Caps Get Peeled"	1994	DFC	Things in tha Hood
"Mo' Love"	1994	DFC	Things in tha Hood
"Gangsta Team"	1994	South Central Cartel, Ice-T, Spice 1, 2Pac	'N Gatz We Truss
"Ain't Nuthin' But Killin'"	1995	—N/a	New Jersey Drive, Vol. 1
"One Less Nigga"	1995	—N/a	Tales from the Hood: The Soundtrack
"Sowhatusayin"	1995	Jayo Felony, Sh'killa, South Central Cartel, Spice 1, Treach, L.V.	The Show: The Soundtrack
"1990-Sick (Kill 'Em All)"	1995	Spice 1	1990-Sick
"Throw Your Hands in the Air"	1996	Cypress Hill, Redman, Erick Sermon	Unreleased and Revamped
"Nine of Em'"	1996	Blackjack	Addicted to Drama
"Paper Chasing"	1997	—N/a	West Coast Bad Boyz II
"Represent"	1997	—N/a	Rhyme & Reason (soundtrack)
"Heavy Weights"	1997	—N/a	Soul Assassins, Chapter 1
"Crucial"	1997	Mayhemm	Global Mayhem
"Bring Me My Cash"	1997	Mayhemm, Lil' Hawk	Global Mayhem
"Professional Stone Crooks"	1997	L.A. Nash	Make Me or Break Me
"Gotta Git Mine"	1997	RBL Posse, Tela	An Eye for an Eye
"Everything's Gonna Be Alright"	1997	Kali's Finest, Israel	Stay Ahead of the Game
"G Shit"	1997	DFC, NOTR	The Whole World's Rotten
"The Ultimate Come Up"	1998	Daz Dillinger, Bad Azz	Retaliation, Revenge and Get Back
"Prelude to a Come Up"	1998	Cypress Hill	Cypress Hill IV
"Get Yo Ride On"	1998	Mack 10, Eazy-E	The Recipe
"#1 Crew in the Area"	1998	Mack 10, K-Mac, Techniec, CJ Mac, WC, Boo Kapone, Binky Mack, Thump, Road Dawgs	The Recipe
"What"	1998	Da K.A.T.	Still Subbin'
"Straight Outta Compton"	1998	King Tee, Dresta	Straight Outta Compton: N.W.A 10th Anniversary Tribute
"One Life to Live"	1998	Pete Rock	Soul Survivor
"Murderfest 99"	1999	Road Dawgs, Mack 10, Ice Cube, Boo Kapone	Don't Be Saprize
"Thicker than Water"	1999	—N/a	Thicker than Water (soundtrack)
"Me & My Bitch"	1999	Techniec	Thicker than Water (soundtrack)
"Hoo-Bangin' C.O.G. Style"	1999	Chilldrin of da Ghetto, Mack 10	Chilldrin of da Ghetto
"Big"	2000	Mack 10, K-Mac, Boo Kapone	WWF Aggression
"Bom Bom"	2000	The Comrads	Wake Up & Ball
"Never Sober"	2000	T.W.D.Y., Numskull, Otis & Shug	Lead the Way
"All I Know"	2001	Celly Cel	Live From the Ghetto
"No Time"	2001	R.W.O., Tucci, Mr. Clean	Book Of Game: Chapter 1
"Fully Autos"	2001	Riderlife, 8Ball	Neva Look Back
"And Ahhh"	2001	Allfrumtha I, The Comrads	Uncut
"Westside and Eastside"	2001	Daz Dillinger	Who Ride wit Us: Tha Compalation, Vol. 1
"People Change"	2002	Sunz of Man, Madame D	Saviorz Day
"Thug A** N***az"	2002	Daz Dillinger, K.A.T.	To Live and Die in CA
"You Ain't Dope"	2003	Doc. Ce	Straight Hustlin
"I Wanna Go Home"	2003	Down AKA Kilo, Mellow Man Ace, Sen Dog	California Cowboys
"Keep It Gangsta"	2003	Savage Life	Street Lyrics, Politics & Bubblin
"Yeah That's Right"	2004	Possible Suspects	The Game is Back
"Cash Flow"	2005	Ridah, Spice 1	Mob Figaz Ridah Presents D Boyz II: The Compilation
"Get Down"	2005	U-God, Squeak Ru, Boo Kapone	Mr. Xcitement
"That'z Gangsta"	2006	Celly Cel	The Wild West
"Smoke Dis"	2006	Napoleon, Jayo Felony	Napoleon Presents Loyalty Over Money
"Sippin'"	2006	Squeak Ru, Damani	Fatworld
"Candy (Drippin' Like Water)"	2006	Snoop Dogg, E-40, Goldie Loc, Daz Dillinger, Kurupt	Tha Blue Carpet Treatment
"Get Your Body Moving"	2007	Snoop Dogg, Kam, Uncle Chucc	Snoop Dogg Presents The Big Squeeze
"Lowrider"	2007	Bouncer Crew	Xtasy for Ladies
"Street Life"	2007	Bouncer Crew	Xtasy for Ladies
"Can't Sell Dope 4Eva"	2008	Yukmouth, Trae	Million Dollar Mouthpiece
"What You Know"	2008	Mr. Shadow, Organized Cartel	Gangsters and Strippers
"Bringin Da Heat"	2008	Doc. Ce	Qualified Hustla
"Late Night Hype 3"	2008	Stomper	The New West Coast
"Fine by Me"	2010	—N/a	DJ Premier Presents Get Used To Us
"Ain't Nuttin' Changed (Remix)"	2010	Blaq Poet, Young Maylay	DJ Premier Presents Get Used To Us
"Carnesade Beef"	2011	40 Glocc, Spider Loc, Moss Major	The Graveyard Shift
"Still Menace"	2011	Eko Fresh, Haftbefehl	Ekrem
"Murder One"	2012	C-Bo, B.G. Knocc Out	Orca
"m.A.A.d City"	2012	Kendrick Lamar	good kid, m.A.A.d city
"West Indeed"	2012	Celly Cel, Young Maylay, Young Dre the Truth, Killa Polk, B.G. Knocc Out, Dresta	Celly Cel Presents - Cali Luv
"Smoke Sumthin"	2013	—N/a	The Green EP: Sour Stacks & Hustling Jacks
"West Coast Love"	2013	Marco Polo, King Tee	PA2: The Director's Cut
"South-West"	2015	DJ EFN, Blu, Kam	Another Time
"Welcome to Los Santos"	2015	Freddie Gibbs, Kokane	Welcome to Los Santos
"Music to Drive By"	2015	DJ Cam	Miami Vice
"Street Life"	2015	DJ Cam	Miami Vice
"Anyway It Goes"	2016	Beneficence	Basement Chemistry
"Any Means"	2016	The Alchemist, Spice 1	Craft Singles (45 Vinyl Series)
"Supply"	2016	The Alchemist, Spice 1	Craft Singles (45 Vinyl Series)
"Been Through It All"	2017	Local-Mu12, Planet Asia, D-Tunez	Everyday People
"Central Ave"	2017	DJ Quik, Problem	Rosecrans
"Funny How Niggas Gon Change Things"	2017	DJ Quik, Problem, Suga Free	Rosecrans
"Studio Gangstas"	2019	Spice 1, Lil Eazy-E, Nawfside Outlaw	Platinum O.G.

== Music videos ==
Title	Year
"Streiht Up Menace"	1993
"All for the Money"	1994
"Geez Make the Hood Go Round"	1994
"Thuggin It Up"	1996
"You Can't See Me" (featuring Tha Chill)	1996
"Hit the Floor" (featuring Daz Dillinger)	1997
"Straight Outta Compton" (featuring King T and Dresta)	1998
"Automatic"	1999
"Tha Hood Still Got Me Under" (featuring Soultre)	1999
"Thicker Than Water" (featuring Val Young)	1999
"Tha Hood Is Mine" (featuring Mack 10 and Techniec)	2000
"So Well"	2010
"Made in Compton"	2010
"Where U Goin 2"	2011
"Fine by Me"	2011
"Shut Em Down" (featuring Outlawz)	2014
"Represent Like This" (featuring WC)	2017
"Compton Zoo"	2017
"Heart Cold" (featuring The Lady of Rage)	2017
