= Battlecat production discography =

The following is a list of songs produced by Battlecat, a hip-hop producer from Los Angeles. Battlecat has produced music albums since 1990, including work for Xzibit, Faith Evans, Snoop Dogg and The Game.

Singles are in bold, album names are in italics.

== 1988 ==
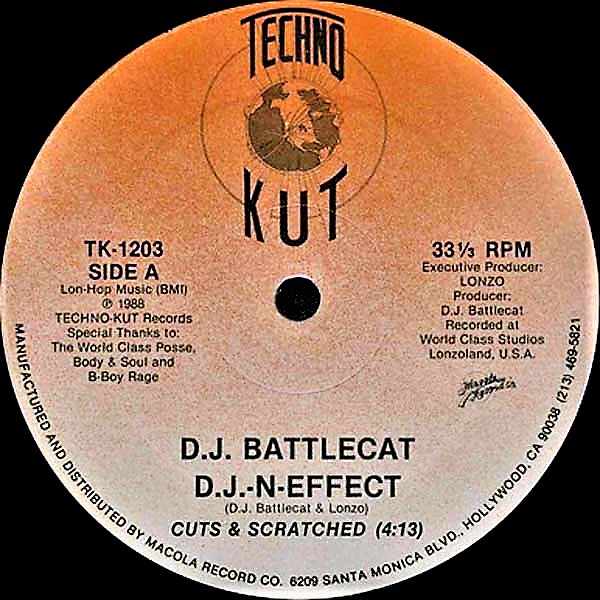
Battlecat produced and released his first record "D.J. N-Effect" in 1988

The Posse - Chapter 2

- 03. D.J. N-Effect

== 1990 ==
Bobby Jimmy & the Critters - Hip Hop Prankster - (February 12)

- **03. Rap Dirty**
- 06. Prankster Prankster
- 07. Is She Really Going Out With Him

== 1991 ==
A Lighter Shade of Brown - Brown & Proud - (July 1)

- 05. Paquito Soul

B.O.X. - Beyond Ordinary X-Istence - (September 24)

- 03. Rock 'Dat A**
- 06. The World We Live In
- 07. The Loc
- 08. Hey Luv
- 10. 2 Much
- 12. B A Real G

== 1992 ==
Various Artists - Trespass Soundtrack - (November 24)

- 05. I'm A Playa - Penthouse Players Clique
- 11. Quick Way Out - WC and the Maad Circle

== 1993 ==
Bloods & Crips - Bangin' on Wax - (March 9)

- 02. Bangin' on Wax

Domino - Domino - (December 7)

- Album Entire

2Pac - I Get Around - CD/Vinyl Single

- B1. I Get Around [Remix] Co-Produced by Howard Johnson, Kris Kellow, Norman Whitfield, Jr. & Paul Arnold

Blaquie - Strictly 4 Ridin' - (Unreleased)

- **00. South Central's In the House**
- 00. Straight Chronic'd Out

Tweedy Bird Loc - Comin out the Cage - CD/Vinyl Single

- 01. Comin Out the Cage [Radio Remix] Co-Produced by J. Stank & Ronnie M Phillips

== 1994 ==
N.O.T.S. - True Blue II: You Only Live Once - (April 11)

- 10. I Wonna Hit the Joint Co-Produced by Keke Loco
- 11. Grind Me Co-Produced by Keke Loco

Tom Jones - The Lead and How to Swing It - (October 18)

- 08. I Don't Think So

Blak Czer - Tales From Da Blak Side - (October 25)

- Album Entire

Spice 1 - AmeriKKKa's Nightmare - (November 22)

- 10. Busta's Can't See Me

I Smooth 7 - T.H.U.G. Poetry

- 04. A T.H.U.G.'s Story Co-Produced by I Smooth 7

Quo - Quo

- **06. Quo Funk**
- 00. Quo Funk [DJ Battlecat Cavy Mix] (Featuring Romy Dee)

== 1995 ==
Po' Broke & Lonely - Forbidden Vibe - (January 1)

- 02. Mr. Go Down
- 05. Hideaway
- 09. Under My Spell
- 10. Three Honeys

Kam - Made in America - (March 14)

- 02. Trust Nobody
- 05. Way'a Life
- **07. In Traffic**

Dana Dane - Rollin' Wit Dana Dane - (March 28)

- 01. Dedication
- 02. Once Again
- **04. Rollin’ Wit Dane - (# 25 US Hip-Hop)**
- 05. Booty Call
- **06. Record Jock - (# 11 US Hip-Hop)**
- 08. **Chester**
- 09. Nina
- 11. Show Me Love
- 13. Ain’t No Love

Poppa LQ - Your Entertainment, My Reality - (August 1)

- 06. Neighborhoodsta Funk
- 08. Die Like a Gee or Live Like a Trick (Featuring CJ Mac & Menace Clan)

2Pac - Supreme Euthanasia - (Unreleased)

- 00. Til I C L.A. (Featuring Coolio & Ice Cube)

Madonna - Human Nature - CD/Vinyl Single - (Unreleased)

- 00. Human Nature [Remix]

== 1996 ==
Dazzie Dee - The Re-Birth - (July 23)

- 02. Intro
- 02. Knee Deep
- 04. Ain't No Busta's This Way (Featuring Ice Cube & K-Dee)
- 05. When a G Meets a G-Stress
- 06. Unda da Table (Featuring Dolemite)
- 07. On My Cide
- 09. Sticcey Situation

Dru Down - Can You Feel Me - (August 20)

- 02. Playa Fo Real

Ras Kass - Soul on Ice - (October 1)

- 03. Marinatin'

Yo-Yo - Total Control - (October 29)

- 01. One for the Cuties (Featuring MC Lyte)
- 02. Yo Yo Funk
- 03. Bonnie and Clyde II (Featuring Ice Cube)
- 07. Body Work
- 08. How Can I Be Down (Featuring Ruff Dogg)

D.B.A. Flip - It's Friday Night (Just Got Paid) - CD/Vinyl Single

- 04. It's Friday Night (Just Got Paid) [Battlecat Version] Co-Produced by Michael "Flip" Barber

Me & My Cousin - Smooth - CD/Vinyl Single

- 03. Smooth [DJ Battlecat Penn State Remix]

== 1997 ==
Glocc/007 - Life After Evolution: Reality Check - (July 15)

  - 1-10. Mind Blowing

Kay Cavie - Life After Evolution: Reality Check - (July 15)

  - 1-13. Caviar Co-Produced by Kannon "Caviar" Cross
  - 2-08. Balla Product (Featuring Kokane)

L.A. Grinders - Life After Evolution: Reality Check - (July 15)

  - 2-01. Reality Check (Featuring Val Young)

Ruff Dogg, King Lou & Baby S - Life After Evolution: Reality Check - (July 15)

  - 2-02. Mama Pray For Me Co-Produced by King Lou

Ruff Dogg, E-Mac & Rump - Life After Evolution: Reality Check - (July 15)

  - 2-04. God Save Me

Ruff Dogg, King Lou, Rump & E-Mac - Life After Evolution: Reality Check - (July 15)

  - 2-05. My Crazy Life

Peeps Game - Life After Evolution: Reality Check - (July 15)

  - 2-06. Supernatural

Ruff Dogg - Life After Evolution: Reality Check - (July 15)

  - 2-07. I Like It

L.A. Nash - Make Me ior Break Me - (August 17)

- 04. It's About Time [Remix] (Featuring Gonzoe, Jewell & Kam)

MQ3 - Everyday - CD/Vinyl Single

- 00. Everyday (DJ Battlecat Remix) (Featuring Crooked I)

Strong Empire - The Remedy

- 01. S. E. Purposes
- 08. Clap Your Hands

Ms. Lydia - Closer Than Friends - Cassette/Vinyl Single

- 00. Closer Than Friends [Remix] (Featuring Peeps Game & Rump)

== 1998 ==
Various Artists - Ride Soundtrack - (January 1)

- 08. Feels So Good - Eastsidaz w/ Snoop Dogg

Various Artists - The Players Club Soundtrack - (March 17)

- **05. Under Pressure -** Kurupt

WC - The Shadiest One - (April 28)

- 01. Hog
- 02. Where Y'all From (Skit)
- 03. Fuckin' Wit Uh House Party
- **07. Just Clownin' - (# 56 US / # 18 US Hip-Hop)**
- 15. It's All Bad

Vontel - Vision of a Dream - (May 19)

- 02. Playa Style
- 07. Keep It on the Real
- 10. Don't Nobody
- 12. Say Playa (Featuring Roger Troutman)
- 14. Boo
- 00. Dream No More [Remix]
- 00. Ghetto Life [Remix]

Gonzoe - If I Live & Nothing Happens - (July 28)

- 04. In the Car With Us (Featuring King Lou)
- 09. You'll Neva Get Next to Me (Featuring Madd Max & Mr. X)

Kurupt - Kuruption! - (October 6)

- 1-04. Play My Cards (Featuring Blaqthoven)
- **1-05. We Can Freak It (Featuring Andre Wilson & Baby S) - (# 89 US Hip-Hop)**

== 1999 ==
Various Artists - The Corruptor Soundtrack - (February 23)

- 15. Reminise - Caffeine

D.E.X. - What They Want What They Need - (March 20)

- 02. Paper Chasin' (Featuring CSW)

TRU - Da Crime Family - (June 1)

- 10. Suppose to Be My Friend (Featuring Charlie Wilson & Snoop Dogg)

Free Style Lee - Lyrical Landscapes - (July 27)

- 19. Battle Cat Shine (Catastroficc)

E-40 - Charlie Hustle: The Blueprint of a Self-Made Millionaire - (August 18)

- 04. Get Breaded (Featuring Fat Joe & Sauce Money)

CJ Mac - Platinum Game - (August 31)

- 08. Ends (Featuring Finale & WC)

Mr. Mike - Rhapsody - (September 7)

- 03. Texas 2000 (Give 'Em What They Want)
- 04. It's a Shame (Featuring Napp-1)
- 07. Why Fall in Love With the Struggle (Featuring Mack 10)
- 11. Partners in Crime Co-Produced by Mr. Mike
- 13. Don't Nobody Really Care
- 14. Know One Knows (Featuring Napp-1) Co-Produced by Mr. Mike
- 15. Play the Card I Was Given (Featuring Ras Kass) Co-Produced by Mr. Mike

various Artists - Thicker Than Water Soundtrack - (October 5)

- 2-12. Blue Liquid - Beefy Loc

Caffeine - Things in the Game Done Changed - (October 12)

- **08. Kimico**

Tash - Rap Life - (November 2)

- 03. G'z Iz G'z (Featuring Kurupt)

Kokane - They Call Me Mr. Kane - (November 16)

- 01. 1999 (Featuring Mr. Short Khop & Peeps Game)
- 02. Section 11350 (Featuring Spice 1)
- 08. Sprinkle With Game (Featuring Big Sir Loon)
- 09. On the Grind
- 10. Mob (Featuring C-Bo)

Snoop Dogg - Just Dippin' - CD/Vinyl Single

- **00. Just Dippin' [Remix] (Featuring Dr. Dre)**

== 2000 ==
Tha Eastsidaz - Snoop Dogg Presents Tha Eastsidaz - (February 1)

- 08. Balls of Steel
- **10. G'd Up (Featuring Butch Cassidy)- (# 47 US / # 19 US Hip-Hop)**
- 13. Ghetto Life (Featuring Kam, Kokane & Nate Dogg)
- 15. Be Thankful (Featuring Pretty Tony & Warren G)
- 16. How You Livin' (Featuring Butch Cassidy)
- 21. LBC Thang (Featuring Butch Cassidy)

Peeps Game - WhichWayzUp - (February 22)

- 08. Take Some
- 09. Why (Featuring Rose Griffin)
- 13. The Rain (Featuring King Lou)

Ice Cube - War & Peace Vol. 2 (The Peace Disc) - (March 1)

- 07. 24 Mo' Hours

Lucy Pearl - Lucy Pearl - (May 23)

- **13. You (Featuring Q-Tip & Snoop Dogg) Co-Produced by Raphael Saadiq**

The Comrads - Wake Up & Ball - (June 27)

- 02. That There

E-40 - Loyalty and Betrayal - (October 10)

- **07. Nah, Nah... (Featuring Nate Dogg) - (# 61 US Hip-Hop)**

Doggy's Angels - Pleezbaleevit! - (November 21)

- **01. Baby If You're Ready (Featuring LaToiya Williams) - (# 28 US Hip-Hop)**
- 03. Game To Get Over (Featuring Tha Eastsidaz)
- 04. Told You So (Featuring Snoop Dogg)
- 05. Gangsta In Me (Featuring LaToiya Williams)
- 07. Pleezbaleevit! (Featuring Layzie Bone & Snoop Dogg)
- 09. Yac & Koke (Featuring Snoop Dogg)
- 18. Put Your Hands Up (Featuring King Lou, Kokane, Ruff Dogg, Snoop Dogg & Soopafly)
- 19. Pop Your Collar 2 Dis (Featuring Snoop Dogg)

Xzibit - Restless - (December 12)

- 03. Been A Long Time (Featuring Nate Dogg)
- **14. Get Your Walk On Co-Produced by Mel-Man**
- 16. Loud & Clear (Featuring Butch Cassidy, Defari & King Tee)

Snoop Dogg - Tha Last Meal - (December 19)

- 08. Stacey Adams (Featuring Kokane)
- 17. Leave Me Alone
- 00. Back Up Ho (Featuring Goldie Loc)

== 2001 ==
Mr. Jekel - Twisted Reality - (January 30)

- 01. Sinners Prayer (Street Mix)
- **11. Sinners Prayer (Radio Edit)**

Mr. Short Khop - Da Khop Shop - (March 20)

- 07. Dey Trippin' (Featuring Problem Chyld & WC)
- **10. Dollaz, Drank & Dank (Featuring Kokane) - (# 59 US Hip-Hop)**
- 12. Flashbacks (Featuring Ice Cube)

Playa Hamm - Layin' Hands - (April 10)

- 04. Wit My Truz Co-Produced by Playa Hamm
- 06. Take U There (Featuring Ruff Dogg) Co-Produced by Playa Hamm
- 07. Workin' This Twist (Feel the Heat) Co-Produced by Playa Hamm
- 09. What a Playa Does (Featuring Priest Chill, Ray Mac & Scorp)
- 11. Hit Again Co-Produced by Playa Hamm
- 12. Sumpn' 2 Do (Featuring Baby S, DJ Battlecat, Lonnie Mack & Titus Fuck)

J-Thug - Hustlin Til I Fall - (May 14)

- Album Entire

Tyrese - 2000 Watts - (May 22)

- **07. Just a Baby Boy** (Featuring Mr. Tan & Snoop Dogg)

Chico & Coolwadda - Wild 'N Tha West - (June 19)

- **05. High Come Down (Featuring Nate Dogg)**

Bad Azz - Personal Business - (July 17)

- 04. Ready 2 Bang
- 07. Personal Business (Featuring Val Young)
- **10. How We Get Down (Featuring Doggy's Angels & LaToiya Williams)**
- 12. Money 2 Fold (Featuring Kurupt & Snoop Dogg)
- 14. Dogghouse Ridaz (Featuring Goldie Loc, Kokane, Snoop Dogg & Suga Free)
- 00. How Far Would You Go? (Featuring Shorty K)

Tha Eastsidaz - Duces 'n Trayz: The Old Fashioned Way - (July 31)

- **02. I Luv It - (# 57 US R&B/Hip-Hop)**
- 04. Crip Hop (Featuring LaToiya Williams)
- 05. I Don't Know (Featuring LaToiya Williams, Soopafly & Suga Free)
- 06. Welcome 2 Tha House (Featuring Nate Dogg & Tha Angels)
- 12. Dogghouse In Your Mouth (Featuring King Lou, Kurupt, Mixmaster Spade, RBX, Ruff Dogg, Soopafly & Suga Free)

Brian McKnight - Superhero - (August 28)

- 11. Don't Know Where To Start (Featuring Nate Dogg) Co-Produced by Brian McKnight

Various Artists - Training Day Soundtrack - (September 11)

- 03. Bounce, Rock, Golden State - The Golden State Project

Various Artists - Bones Soundtrack - (October 9)

- 03. Lost Angels in the Sky - Lost Angels with Kokane
- 06. This Is My Life - Kendrick with C.P.O.
- 16. Gagsta Wit It - Snoop Dogg with Nate Dogg & Bootsy Collins

Kenny Lattimore - Weekend - (October 9)

- 03. Come to Me

Jayo Felony - Crip Hop - (October 23)

- 05. What Ya Need

Faith Evans - Faithfully - (November 6)

- 11. Faithfully

Nate Dogg - Music & Me - (December 4)

- 10. Concrete Streets

Identikal & Benjilino - Identikal & Benjilino

- 08. Party wit Us (Featuring Gonzoe)

Knoc-turn'al - Knoc's Landin' - (Unreleased)

- 00. All About the Doe
- 00. Everywhere I Go (Featuring Chyna Girl)
- 00. If I Could
- 00. L.A. Confidential (Featuring Slip Capone)
- 00. Only If It's Gangsta (Featuring Chyna Girl)
- 00. What They Say (Featuring Bad Azz & Slip Capone)
- 00. Whatcha Gonna Do (Featuring Chyna Girl & Slip Capone)
- 00. When It All Comes Down to It (Featuring Dr. Dre, Slip Capone & Timebomb)

== 2002 ==
Frost - Still Up inThis $#*+! - (April 23)

- 05. Everybody Knows (Featuring Mellow Man Ace)

RL - RL: Ements - (April 23)

- **13. Do U Wanna Roll (Featuring Lil' Kim & Snoop Dogg) - (# 70 US Hip-Hop)**

Ras Kass - Wolfpac Records Presents... Still More Bounce - (April 24)

- **02. Still More Bounce (Featuring Dirty Rat, Kam, Merciless Stylz & Tash)**

Truth Hurts - Truthfully Speaking - (June 25)

- 00. No Lies

Tray Deee - The General's List - (October 21)

- 17. Street Sweepin' (Featuring Big Rocc & Boom Bam)

Deborah Cox - The Morning After - (November 5)

- 06. Just a Dance (Featuring Kurupt)

King Lou - King Lou's Lounge - (November 7)

- 01. Lost Angels in the Sky (Featuring I Smooth 7, Kokane, Poppa LQ & Ruff Dogg)
- 02. In the Car With Us (Featuring Gonzoe)
- 08. We Keep It G (Featuring Andre Wilson, I Smooth 7 & Ruff Dogg)
- 10. Testin' the Mic (Featuring Catastrophic, Loucuz Mc Kane & Mr. Harris)
- 12. Dogghouse in Your Mouth (Featuring Kurupt, Mixmaster Spade, RBX, Ruff Dogg, Soopafly, Suga Free & Tha Eastsidaz)
- 17. Put Your Hands Up (Featuring Doggy's Angels, Kokane, Ruff Dogg, Snoop Dogg & Soopafly)

WC - Ghetto Heisman - (November 12)

- 08. Walk (Featuring Ice Cube & Mack 10)
- 09. Tears of a Killa (Featuring Butch Cassidy)

Snoop Dogg - Paid tha Cost To Be da Bo$$ - (November 26)

- 07. Ballin' (Featuring Lil' ½ Dead & The Dramatics)
- 00. Tell Me What U Really Want

Kilo Kapanel - Street Fame

- 18. F**king Around (Featuring Lameeze & Lil' David)

OG Daddy V - The Compton OG

- 06. It's the D.O.G. (Featuring Snoop Dogg)

== 2003 ==
40 Glocc - The Jakal - (January 7)

- 03. Everybody

Boo-Yaa T.R.I.B.E. - West Koasta Nostra - (October 7)

- Album Entire

Eastwood - Christian: Name Vs. Way of Life

- 02. L.A.
- 06. N the Cut
- 17. God's Gift

Tha Eastsidaz - Gang Bang Muzik: Frequency of the Streets - (Unreleased)

- 00. Bottom Girl (Featuring Kokane & Nate Dogg)
- 00. Chemical Reaction
- 00. Dirt Diggler (Featuring Bokie Loc & Lost Angels) Produced with Goldie Loc
- 00. Doin’ It for Life (Featuring Blaqthoven & Butch Cassidy)
- 00. Friday Night (Featuring Bokie Loc)
- 00. Let's Go (Featuring Nate Dogg & Ricky Harris)
- 00. Real Talk (Featuring Big Rocc & MC Ren)
- 00. Succ Me Licc Me Bitch (Featuring Bokie Loc, Conflict & Mykestro) Produced with Goldie Loc

== 2004 ==
Various Artists - Soul Plane Soundtrack - (May 28)

- 00. Soul Plane - Snoop Dogg w/ LaToiya Williams

Truth Hurts - Ready Now - (June 1)

- 04. Love U Better

Spice 1 - The Ridah - (June 8)

- 02. Cutthroat Game
- 04. Behind Closed Doors

213 - The Hard Way - (August 17)

- 04. Keep It Gangsta
- 11. Ups & Downs (Featuring Boki) Co-Produced by Tha Chill
- 15. MLK

Rated Real - From Nothin' to Somethin' - (September 16)

- Album Entire

Survivalist - Retribution - (October 26)

- 03. Immaculate (Featuring Kumandae)
- 04. Contemplating (Featuring Christopher Williams)
- 07. My Journey (Featuring Kumandae)
- 09. Everything Is You (Featuring Ms. D)

Dirty Rat - Rookie of the Year - (November 2)

- 10. She's a Freak (Featuring Blaqthoven)

Paperboy - The Love Never Dies - (November 23)

- **01. California (Produced with Rhythm D)**

Xzibit - Weapons of Mass Destruction - (December 14)

- 08. Criminal Set (Featuring Krondon)

Funq Ruut - Untitled Album - (Unreleased)

- 00. John Doe
- 00. Mary Jane

Roscoe - Untitled Album - (Unreleased)

- 00. This Is How We Do (Featuring Bobby V & Court Luve)

== 2005 ==
Glasses Malone - White Lightnin'... (Sticks) - (March 25)

- 14. Take a Fade

Scipio - DJ Warrior & DJ Strong Presents: West Coast Mixtape Kings, Vol. 1 - (October 17)

- 27. Freestyle

Various Artists - Bigg Snoop Dogg Presents...Welcome to tha Chuuch: Da Album - (December 13)

- **05. Real Soon -** DPGC
- 11. Notorious DPG - Lady of Rage, RBX & Kurupt
- 13. Shine - Mykestro

Cavie - The Ghetto Star

- 05. Everyday (Featuring Tank)
- 16. Chevy Classics (Featuring Kokane & Pomona City Rydaz)

King Lou - Heat of the Night - (Unreleased)

- 01. Why Must I (Featuring Poppa LQ & Ruff Dogg) Produced with Rhythm D
- 03. Roll Dogs (Featuring Lost Angels)
- 05. Your the Reason (Featuring Xavier) Co-Produced by Tempo
- 11. Hey O Girl (Featuring Knoc-turn'al & Lost Angels)
- 16. OG School (Featuring Andre Wilson, Doggy's Angels & Ruff Dogg) Produced with Tempo

== 2006 ==
Joi - Tennessee Slim Is the Bomb - (March 28)

- 02. Tennessee Slim Is the BOMB

MC Eiht - Affiliated - (April 4)

- 13. Pipe Down (Featuring Bokie Loc & Tha Chill)

Mykestro - Where U From?! b/w Fireman - CD/Vinyl Single - (June 26)

- 06. Raw and Uncutt

Tha Dogg Pound - Cali Iz Active - (June 27)

- **01. Cali Iz Active**
- 04. Stop Lyin'
- 10. It's All Hood (Featuring Ice Cube)
- 15. Face 2 Face

Hittman - Hittmanic Verses - (October 22)

- 05. When It Comes to the Hoes (Featuring Dr. Dre)
- 06. Let Shit Go (Featuring Knoc-turn'al)
- 10. Front Page

Yung Walt - Hustle 2 Struggle - (October 31)

- 03. Why Niggas (Featuring James Fauntleroy II)
- 13. Take My (Featuring YN)

Snoop Dogg - Tha Blue Carpet Treatment - (November 21)

- 01. Intrology (Featuring George Clinton)
- 10. LAX (Featuring Ice Cube)
- 13. A Bitch I Knew Co-Produced by Rhythm D
- 00. Feeling of Love (Featuring Jasmine Lopez)
- 00. My People
- 00. Steppin Over Dogg Shit

Wreckloose - Are You Ready? - (December 15)

- 12. Callin' Me (Battlecat Remix) (Featuring George Clinton)

Crazy DJ - B.I.G. - CD/Vinyl Single

- **01. B.I.G. (Featuring DJ Battlecat)**

Eastwood - The Ride

- 01. Change
- 03. Hope
- 04. Faith Don't Fail (Featuring Andre Wilson)
- 05. Do'n Watcha Do (Featuring DJ Rogers)
- 12. Life Savor

J.T.N. - Project J.T.N.

- 16. Top Notch

== 2007 ==
E-Wil, Kash, Millticket & D.J.uan - All Lies On Me: Original Motion Picture Soundtrack - (April 23)

- 02. West Is Back

Big-O, Rough-Dog & T-Moe - All Lies On Me: Original Motion Picture Soundtrack - (April 23)

- 12. Put You Up On Game

Soopafly - Bangin West Coast - (May 22)

- 13. Smacc Yo' A**

Mykestro - Quality Over Quantity - (July 7)

- 09. Five Two (Featuring Mike Anthony)
- 10. My Pen's Full of Juice
- 24. Let's Go

Talib Kweli - Eardrum - (August 27)

- 10. Give 'Em Hell (Featuring Coi Mattison & Lyfe Jennings) Co-Produced by Terrace Martin

Kurupt - Bangin'... Pain, Pride, & Destruction - (September 25)

- 03. Get Off Me

DJ Battlecat & B.O.X. - Bangin'... Pain, Pride, & Destruction - (September 25)

- 05. I'm a G

J-Ro - Rare Earth B-Boy Funk, Vol. II - (October 23)

- 04. It's So Hard

Baby S - Street Swangin' - (December 18)

- 03. Street Swangin'

Kurupt - Untitled Album - (Unreleased)

- 00. Mystic River

== 2008 ==
Mista Cavi - Raw & Uncut pt. 2 - (January 1)

- 11. U Can't Be My B**** (Featuring Russ Frank) Co-Produced by C-Ballin

Holy D - God's Creation - (June 15)

- 03. Get Urself 2Gether
- 04. Never Been Blessed!
- 05. How God Rolls
- 06. Ain't No Stoppin' God
- 08. Sumthing About Jesus
- 09. I Know It's Jesus
- 10. God's Watching Me
- 13. Without God!

Snoop Dogg - The City is in Good Hands - (July 4)

- 09. After All (Featuring Da Brat & Kurupt)

2Five - The Watcher - (September 25)

- 04. When We Ride

Mykestro - Emotion On My Sleeve - (November 28)

- 06. Skillz.Still.Appeal. (Featuring Techniec)
- 11. Wow
- 16. Skillz.Still.Appeal. (Featuring Cuban K. Soze)
- 17. Skillz.Still.Appeal. (Featuring Conflict)
- 19. Like That

Ablaze - Untitled Album - (Unreleased)

- 00. Grown Shit

Baby S - Crenshaw & Slauson - (Unreleased)

- 00. Street Life

Big Business - Untitled Album

- 00. A New Day

== 2009 ==
DJ 2High - Westcoast Gangsta Sh*t, Vol. 1 - (March 10)

- 03. Necc Brace Muzic (Featuring Boom Bam & Goldie Loc)

Eastwood - Street Game - (March 31)

- 01. My Turn
- 03. If The Shoe Fit Wear It Radio
- 04. 4 Make It Right (Featuring Michael "Salsberry" Angelo)
- 08. Not 4 Me
- 09. It Don't Bother Me (Featuring Andre Wilson)
- 12. The Rescue
- 14. Prodigal Son (Featuring Thomas Clay)
- 15. It's Cool (Featuring B.O.X., DJ Battlecat & Fatigue)

Chalie Mak - Who's Chalie Mak: The Street Album - (August 17)

- 03. While the Music Plays
- 16. Cali4mula

Jay Rock - 30 Day Takeover - (September 9)

- 29. Smoke Chronic (Featuring ScHoolboy Q & Spider Loc)

Dough the Freshkid - Million Dollar Dreams: The Mixtape - (November 16)

- 20. Freshcode (Featuring DJ Battlecat)

Mykestro - Adversity & Ambiance - (November 24)

- 05. Skillz.Still.Appeal. (Featuring Kendrick Lamar)
- 11. On & On
- 12. Direct Defyance
- 13. Just Don't Know Produced with Larrance Dopson
- 15. Skillz.Still.Appeal. (Featuring Ab-Soul)
- 18. Foe Fifteen's
- 20. Press Box Flow

Snoop Dogg - Malice n Wonderland - (December 8)

- 10. Secrets (Featuring Kokane)

== 2010 ==
Young Giantz - G-Qcality, Chapter 1 - (January 4)

- 01. N-Trance (DJ Battlecat)
- 03. Yahweh Got Uz

Snoop Dogg - Snoop Dogg Presents: The West Coast Blueprint - (February 23)

- 21. Check Yo Self [Snoop Dogg G-Mix] (Featuring Hustle Boyz) Co-Produced by Larrance Dopson

Bishop Lamont - Mecha-God Spilla - (November 10)

- 05. Nothing Could Be Better (Featuring Bokie Loc, Butch Cassidy, Chevy Jones & Suga Free) Produced with 1500 Or Nothin'
- 19. What's Up Wit U (Featuring Mike Anthony & Turie Da Vocalist)

Invinceable - Untitled Album

- 00. So Loaded

== 2011 ==
Rican - Faded - (February 8)

- 04. Love You (Featuring DJ Battlecat)

Snoop Dogg - Doggumentary - (March 29)

- 02. The Way Life Used To Be
- 04. Wonder What It Do (Featuring Uncle Chucc)
- 00. I Was Used to Be

Ill Camille - The Pre Write - (May 16)

- 12. All I Know (Featuring Brevi)

The Hit-Men - By Any Means - (June 7)

- 02. What U Kno?

Snoop Dogg - Bastards of the Party Soundtrack - (August 30)

- 05. Last Days (Featuring B.O.X., C. Vanardo, Chris Starr, & Eastwood)

brandUn DeShay - All Day DeShay: AM - (September 30)

- 10. 1 Up!

Glocc Sinatra - The Gathering - (Unreleased)

- **00. Another Question**

== 2012 ==
BJ the Chicago Kid - Pineapple Now-Laters - (February 21)

- 01. Pineapple Now-Laters Intro (Featuring DJ Battlecat & Harold Greene) Co-Produced by Harold Greene
- 14. The World Is A Ghetto (Featuring DJ Battlecat, Jairus Mozee & Kendrick Lamar) Co-Produced by Jairus Mozee

Kaos Brought - Half Man Half Kush - (March 6)

- 01. Get Lifted

Snoop Dogg - Stoner's EP - (April 17)

- 02. Stoner's Anthem

Big Sono - Respect Ur Elderz - (April 21)

- 01. Only Human (Featuring B.O.X., Ill Camille & Iman Omari)
- 02. Hard Labor (Featuring B.O.X., Benjamin Franklin & D-Dash)
- 06. L.A.z Favorite (Featuring B.O.X. & G.Ca$$o)
- 08. Whatever (Featuring Haas & Hookman) Produced with Docc Free

Invinceable - Invinceable - (April 24)

- 01. Baby Girl
- **04. A Soldier Never Dies (Featuring Jon B)**

Tha Dogg Pound - DPGC'ology - (April 24)

- 16. 4ever N A Day [G-Mix] (Featuring Snoop Dogg) Produced with Amplified

Mykestro - The Barmittzpha - (May 15)

- 1-01. That's Him ( Instro )
- 1-05. Mylanta
- 1-09. Set Precedent (Featuring Kendrick Lamar)
- 1-18. Say Grace
- 2-10. Mycrafone Murdah (Featuring Horseshoe Gang)
- 2-14. S.S.A. (Featuring Horseshoe Gang)

Tylo - On Tha Real - (May 29)

- 01. Hoodnite (Featuring Black)

Invinceable - 2 - (August 10)

- 08. Shake Your Body

Yung Solo - Gilbert Grape Mixtape, Vol. 2 - (August 23)

- 15. Reflexions (Featuring Big Sono, Haas & Kam)

Big Sono - LeftOverz (EP) - (September 30)

- 03. Sono (What’z Goin On) (Featuring BC Powda)

E-40 & Too $hort - History: Mob Music - (November 6)

- 08. Do You Remember? (Featuring DJ Battlecat & Kurupt)

Kahsyno - Memoirs of a Time Traveler

- 00. Toast (Featuring DJ Battlecat)
- 00. West Coast Life

T Lae - Untitled Album

- 00. Tough

== 2013 ==
Young Giantz - #LoveLove - (February 18)

- 06. Ooh Wee (Featuring Andre Wilson) Produced with Trio Cliqq
- 12. So Gee [Remix] (Featuring K-Young & Yung Berg)
- 15. Ova N Ova (Featuring Playa Hamm & Toke Da Smoke)

KOZ - TRIAL - (March 20)

- 07. Come On 2 My Room

Kurupt - Money, Bitches, Power - (May 1)

- 03. Money (Do It For Me) (Featuring RBX) Produced with J. Wells & Knotch

Daichi - iScream - (May 23)

- **08. Good Time**

Daz Dillinger & WC - West Coast Gangsta Shit - (August 13)

- 07. Don't Get Wet

Mykestro - TheKidJ Presents: HandsOnHipHop - (November 11)

- 03. Rose Gold Movado

R.B.D. - All IV Him: Tha EP

- 03. All Eyez On the Prize (Featuring DJ Battlecat) Produced with Amplified

Bone Thugs-N-Harmony - The Art of War: World War III - (December 10)

- 16. It Will Be Alright (Featuring Por'cha) Produced with DJ U-Neek

Tha Dogg Pound - Untitled Album

- 00. L.A. Here's 2 U [Remix] (Featuring Snoop Dogg & Wyann Vaughn) Produced with Amplified

== 2014 ==
Ricky Rude - Ready to Live - (February 10)

- 09. Be Cool (Featuring Glasses Malone)

Mykestro - Pipe Dreams EP - (February 11)

- 01. Act 1 ( The Essence )
- 06. You Know
- 07. German Chocolate (Featuring B.O.X.)
- 08. Smacc Ya Ass
- 10. Act 3 ( That Good ) Produced with Larrance Dopson

Show Luciano - R&B: Rap & Busine$$ - (February 22)

- 04. Crazy
- 05. Do It
- 00. Bang Ya Speakers
- 00. Vacation (Featuring Kurupt)

Marwan - Marwan - (February 24)

- **03. ButterBombay**

Baby S - Best of "S" - (March 18)

- 08. Conversation (Featuring Snoop Dogg)
- 18. Pull It Out

Troop - Deepa (Revisited) - (June 5)

- 04. Thizzle Produced with Michaelangelo

WAX - 神風吹く日本から愛を込めて - (October 8)

- 01. にやにやにやけてる今も何処かで
- 02. 超自然で調子いい (Featuring BRON-K)
- 03. だいじょうぶだぁ (Featuring DJ DEEQUITE)
- 04. 独自のやり口 (Featuring NORIKIYO)
- 05. 何かを変えるんだ今 (Featuring M.O.J.I. & Ojibah)
- 06. 2tight Music
- 07. ナツカシ
- 08. 今見えるもの (Featuring DJ DEEQUITE)
- 09. ノリに乗ってる男、それ俺
- 10. 新しい夜明け (Featuring BRON-K)
- 11. 自由で平和だ (Featuring KYN TKC)
- 12. 当然の様に思う事

Medusa - Corsets & Cufflinks - (October 17)

- 01. Back N the Dayz (Featuring DJ Battlecat, Marknoxx & Young Koup)
- 03. Bizarre Tango (Featuring DJ Battlecat & Marknoxx)

Thurz - Designer EP - (November 4)

- 04. Favorite Girl (Featuring Kent Jamz) Produced with Marlon "Chordz" Barrow

DJ Battlecat - Inner City Dreams - (November 25)

- 07. Knock Knock (Featuring Daniel Beaty)

Glasses Malone - Inner City Dreams - (November 25)

- 05. Let Me Warn U, U're Playin' Wit Fire (Featuring Lena J)

Glocc Sinatra - Inner City Dreams - (November 25)

- 06. Tour Guide (Featuring B.O.X.)

B.O.X. - Flatland Family: Self Contained, Volume One - (December 13)

- 08. Too Black Too Strong

Og Big MaMa - Flatland Family: Self Contained, Volume One - (December 13)

- 03. Put It in the Air (Featuring B.O.X. & Split P) Produced with Og Big MaMa
- 04. So Cold

Carlos McSwain & DJ Battlecat - Untitled Album - (Unreleased)

- 00. Tha Drummer

E3 - Serious Pimp Records, Vol. 1

- 12. Night Time

FoKeS iM ThAt DudE - Untitled Album - (Unreleased)

- 00. Ain't No Turning Bacc

Natural Red - Untitled Album - (Unreleased)

- 00. Cali Life

Luciano Bassi - Untitled Album - (Unreleased)

- 00. Take Your Clothes Off Produced with The Real Richie Rich

Toni Monroe - Untitled Album - (Unreleased)

- 00. Get Dough (Featuring Andre Wilson)

== 2015 ==
Young Giantz - Itz In Uz, Not On Uz - (May 16)

- 02. Itz In Uz, Not On Uz
- 03. Undaground
- 06. G N Ya Lyfe (Featuring K-Young)
- 19. Skillz.Still.Appeal. (Featuring Mykestro)
- 00. Don't Stop Party'n

Mr. Criminal - Evolution of A G - (August 7)

- 03. Wild Wild West
- 19. So True (Featuring DJ Battlecat)
- **20. Waiting for Your Letters (Featuring Kam, Knotch & Kurupt)**

Tuxedo - Tuxedo Remixes - (October 2)

- 02. Watch the Dance [Battlecat Remix]

The Game - The Documentary 2.5 - (October 16)

- 12. Up On the Wall (Featuring Problem, Ty Dolla $ign & YG)

Mac Lucci - Cortez Music 4

- 11. Gangsta Delight (Featuring Goldie Loc) Produced with Dae One

Mike Murray - The Walk On - (Unreleased)

- **00. How We Play**

== 2016 ==
Snoop Dogg - G7: Soundtrack - (January)

- 00. Don't Push Me (Featuring Raheem DeVaughn)

A Dot K - The Non Religious Truth - (January 22)

- 01. Pay Attention (Featuring Janice Freeman) Produced with Larrance Dopson
- 02. Can We Parlay (Featuring Dawn Bonds) Produced with Dae One
- 04. These Streets (Featuring DJ Battlecat & Missippi) Produced with Tweek Beatz
- 12. Head Held High (Featuring Ben Rostien & Majzay)
- 00. Westcoast Supreme [Remix] (Featuring Glasses Malone)

Kokane - King of GFunk - (March 18)

- 1-08. I've Been There

Kam - Mutual Respect - (May 13)

- **04. Waiting for Your Letters (Featuring Knotch, Kurupt & Mr. Criminal)**
- **13. Chop It Up (Featuring Down AKA Kilo & Rose Gold)**

Nikkel Plate - Venice Beach Cruiser - (June 6)

- 14. Concrete Jungle Produced with Nikkel Plate

Big Tray Deee - The 3rd Coming - (September 16)

- 13. Tell Me About It! (Featuring Crooked I & Problem)
- 14. Eastside Finest (Featuring Goldie Loc)
- 17. This World

A.R.G. - Untitled Album

- 00. Realism

T'Angelo - Untitled Album

- 00. Paint the Town (Featuring Mimi Jackson)

Young Giantz - Fleetwood Brougham - (Unreleased)

- **00. Fly High (Featuring Andre Wilson) Produced with Dae One**

== 2017 ==
Bell Biv DeVoe - Three Stripes - (January 27)

- 07. Don't Go

Ill Camille - Heirloom - (March 6)

- **01. Black Gold Co-Produced by DDot Omen & Paperboy Fabe**
- 08. Spider's Jam (Featuring Georgia Anne Muldrow & JaVonté) Produced with Rick Hughes

Faith Evans & The Notorious B.I.G. - The King & I - (May 19)

- 13. A Little Romance

Snoop Dogg - Neva Left - (May 19)

- 08. Big Mouth
- 10. 420 (Blaze Up) (Featuring Devin the Dude, Wiz Khalifa & DJ Battlecat)
- 12. Let Us Begin (Featuring KRS-One)
- 14. Vapors (DJ Battlecat Remix) (Featuring Charlie Wilson & Teena Marie)
- 15. Still Here

Kokane - It's Kokane Not Lemonhead - (July 7)

- 07. It Was All A Dream

Janice Freeman - Love Inspired EP - (Unreleased)

- 00. Love Travelin'

== 2018 ==
Snoop Dogg - Snoop Dogg Presents: Bible of Love - (March 16)

- 1-08. Sunshine Feel Good (Featuring Kim Burrell)

Andy Stokes - Now - EP - (April 16)

- 06. We On Da Flo (Featuring Snoop Dogg)

Mykestro - The BARtenders: Red Beans & Rice - (November 19)

- 02. 60 Seconds of Slicc Produced with Mykestro

Tylo - Untitled Album

- 00. The Shaw District

Young Buck - Unexpected - (Unreleased)

- 00. Untitled Track (Featuring Kokane)

== 2019 ==
Erick Sermon - Vernia - (April 19)

- 11. May Sound Crazy (Featuring Devin the Dude & Too $hort)

Big Sono - Breakfast for Dinner - (July 15)

- 03. BBW (Featuring Big2daboy & Dr. Pooch) Produced with Mofak

Snoop Dogg - I Wanna Thank Me - (August 16)

- **02. So Misinformed (Featuring Slick Rick)**
- **03. One Blood, One Cuzz (Featuring DJ Battlecat)**
- **04. Let Bygones Be Bygones**
- 09. New Booty
- **22. I Wanna Thank Me (Featuring Marknoxx)**

La Brea - Losses - (August 27)

- 04. That Walk (Featuring DJ Battlecat)

Mykestro - Untitled Album

- 00. Don't Be Late
- 00. Proud to Pay Homage

== 2020 ==
D Smoke - Black Habits - (February 7)

- 06. Sunkissed Child (Featuring Iguocho & Jill Scott) Produced with Larrance Dopson

Deniro Farrar - Sole Food - (February 21)

- 06. Liberated Mind (Featuring Trinidad James)

Mykestro - King Arthur - (March 1)

- 05. Gangsta Blues Produced with Jaazquait

6lack - 6pc Hot EP - (June 26)

- 05. Elephant In the Room Produced with Brody Brown, Larrance Dopson & Timbaland

South Central Cartel - IITIGHT Compilation, Vol. 4 - (September 8)

- 02. Holla When U C Me

AG - Blue Benjamin: Before The Feds Rocc

- **00. Evergreen (Featuring Kokane & Young Buck)**

Corde77 - Untitled Album

- 00. Slow Ride (Featuring Curren$y) Produced with Chris Gutierrez, Franky Vasquez & Fredwreck Nassar

DJ Battlecat - Untitled Album

- **00. They Can't Tame Us (Featuring 2Eleven, Glasses Malone, Rucci, Snoop Dogg & Vidal Sebastian)**

Kam - Untitled Album

- 00. Legend In My Section (Featuring Kurupt & Tha Chill)
- 00. Race War (Featuring David Banner)

Krooks the Felon - Untitled Album

- **00. Ain't Used To It**

Kurupt - Transition

- 00. Untitled Track (Featuring Ice Cube)

Natural Red - Red Girl Blue City

- **00. Undisputed Produced with David "Big Qluso" Lindley**

Snoop Dogg - Take It From A G

- 00. Talk That Shit (Featuring Kokane) Produced with Amplified

Thurz - Untitled Album

- 00. Nasty Produced with JohnnyStormBeats

== 2021 ==
Mt. Westmore - American Skin: Music Inspired by the Original Motion Picture - (January 15)

- 01. Step Child

NHALE - The Next Episode - (March 15)

- 09. So Long

== 2022 ==
Snoop Dogg - BODR - (February 11)

- 01. Still Smokin
- 03. Coming Back
- 11. Outside The Box
- 18. Snoopy Don't Go

== 2023 ==
DJ Battlecat & Kam

- Legend In My Section (Featuring Kurupt & Tha Chill (CMW))

== Unconfirmed ==
Crooked I - Untitled Album

- 00. Crook In Me (Featuring Nate Dogg)
- 00. Nobody Understands Me

Young Giantz - Untitled Album

- 00. We Ballaz
