= The Murda Show =

Single by Spice 1 featuring MC Eiht

from the album 187 He Wrote
- Released: November 29, 1993
- Recorded: 1993
- Genre: Hip hop
- Label: Jive Records
- Songwriter(s): Spice 1, MC Eiht
- Producer(s): MC Eiht

Spice 1 featuring MC Eiht singles chronology
"Dumpin' Em in Ditches" (1993)	"The Murda Show" (1993)	"Strap on the Side" (1994)

MC Eiht singles chronology
"Streiht Up Menace" (1993)	"The Murda Show" (1993)	"All for the Money" (1994)

Music video
- "The Murda Show" on YouTube

"The Murda Show" is a 1993 song by West Coast rapper Spice 1. The song originally appeared on the album, 187 He Wrote. It featured a guest appearance by fellow West Coast rapper MC Eiht, and this song would mark the beginning of a business relationship between the two rappers, and would be the first of many collaborations between the two over the years. Released at what was arguably the height of Spice's career, the song peaked at number 50 on the Billboard Hot Rap Songs chart. A music video was made for the song and the song would be released as a 12-inch single. A sequel song, entitled The Murder Show, Pt. 2 was later recorded by the two rappers in 2004 for their first collaboration album titled The Pioneers.
