= N' My Neighborhood =

Studio album by MC Eiht
- Released: June 20, 2000
- Recorded: 2000
- Genre: West Coast hip-hop; gangsta rap
- Length: 47:32
- Label: Hoo-Bangin'; Priority
- Producer: Young Tre; Caviar; DJ Raw Steele; MC Eiht; Overdose; Binky Mack; DJ Slip

MC Eiht chronology
Section 8 (1999)	N' My Neighborhood (2000)	Tha8t'z Gangsta (2001)

Professional ratings
Review scores
Source	Rating
AllMusic	2.5/5 stars
The Source	3/5 stars

N' My Neighborhood is the fifth studio album by American rapper MC Eiht. It was released on June 20, 2000, through Hoo-Bangin' Records and Priority Records, making it his sophomore and final album for the label. The album was produced by Young Tre, Caviar, DJ Raw Steele, DJ Slip, Overdose, Binky Mack of Allfrumtha I, and MC Eiht, with Hoo-Bangin' Records founder Mack 10 serving as executive producer. It features guest appearances from Mack 10, Soultre, Techniec, and CMW members.

The album peaked at number 95 on the Billboard 200 and at number 23 on the Top R&B/Hip-Hop Albums chart in the United States. It sold over 300,000 copies, which was great considering the album had little promotion.

Along with a single, a music video was produced for the song "Tha Hood Is Mine" featuring Mack 10 and Techniec. The video is set in the fashion of the movie Menace II Society, which co-starred MC Eiht.

== Track listing ==
No.	Title	Writer(s)	Producer(s)	Length
1.	"Intro"			2:08
2.	"Git Money" (featuring Techniec and Tha Chill)	A. Tyler; D. Williams; V. Johnson; T. Allen	DJ Slip	3:32
3.	"Tha Hood Is Mine" (featuring Mack 10 and Techniec)	A. Tyler; D. Rollison; D. Williams; K. Cross; W. Moore	Caviar; Overdose	3:54
4.	"From Yo Hood 2 My Hood"	A. Tyler; T. Green	Young Tre	3:44
5.	"Till I Die" (featuring Mack 10)	A. Tyler; D. Rollison; K. Cross; W. Moore	Caviar; Overdose	4:42
6.	"Hold Up" (featuring Soultre)	A. Tyler; T. Green	Young Tre	4:28
7.	"So Ruff"	A. Tyler; T. Green	Young Tre	3:52
8.	"All Around the Hood" (featuring Boom Bam and Barbara Wilson)	A. Tyler; G. Heisser; R. Garner	Binky Mack	4:00
9.	"Must Be Murder"	A. Tyler; N. Steele	DJ Raw Steel; MC Eiht	4:56
10.	"Lunatic"	A. Tyler; T. Green	Young Tre	3:53
11.	"Hood Ratz"	A. Tyler; N. Steele	DJ Raw Steel; MC Eiht	3:59
12.	"Once Upon a Time n' the Ghetto"	A. Tyler; T. Green	Young Tre	4:24
Total length:				47:32

== Charts ==
Chart (2000)	Peak position
US Billboard 200	95
US Top R&B/Hip-Hop Albums (Billboard)	23
