= We Come Strapped =

Studio album by MC Eiht featuring CMW
- Released: July 19, 1994
- Recorded: 1993–1994
- Studio: X-Factor (Long Beach, Calif.)
- Genre: West Coast hip-hop; gangsta rap; G-funk
- Length: 57:52
- Label: Epic Street
- Producer: MC Eiht (also exec.); DJ Slip; Masta Rick Rock

MC Eiht chronology
| We Come Strapped (1994) | Death Threatz (1996) |

Singles from We Come Strapped
- 1. "All for the Money" Released: June 1994; 2. "Geez Make the Hood Go Round" Released: October 11, 1994

We Come Strapped is the debut studio album by American rapper MC Eiht. It was released on July 19, 1994, through Epic Street. The recording sessions took place at X-Factor Studios in Long Beach, California. The album was produced by Compton's Most Wanted members MC Eiht and DJ Slip, except for one song, "Compton Bomb", produced by Ric Roc. It features contributions from William "Willie Z" Zimmerman on the keyboards, Josh Achziger on guitar, Carla Evans on vocals, and guest appearances from rappers Redman and Spice 1. In addition to a Parental Advisory sticker, Epic also included text on the album cover that noted that Eiht's lyrics reflected his personal views.

The album peaked at number 5 on the Billboard 200 and at number 1 on the Top R&B/Hip-Hop Albums chart in the United States, and was certified gold by the Recording Industry Association of America on September 29, 1994. It has been MC Eiht's most successful album to date.

It spawned two singles and music videos for the songs "All for the Money" and "Geez Make the Hood Go Round".

== Background ==
Despite the CMW title on the album cover, We Come Strapped is considered to be MC Eiht's debut solo album. In addition to MC Eiht, from CMW, the album features DJ Slip on keyboards and production, as well as DJ Mike T's scratches in one song only. However, MC Eiht mentions the fellow group members by name-dropping Boom Bam, Tha Chill, Lil Hawk & Bird, and Niggaz on tha Run throughout the album. The rapper insults DJ Quik on the track "Def Wish III" due to their then-ongoing feud.

== Critical reception ==
Professional ratings
Review scores
| Source | Rating |
|---|---|
| AllMusic | 3.5/5 stars |
| Entertainment Weekly | A− |
| The Indianapolis Star | 3.5/4 stars |
| RapReviews | 8/10 |
| The Source | 4/5 stars |

The Indianapolis Star wrote: "While chilling in its acceptance of violence, the disc is about attitude. We're drawn into the violence by lightly funked bass, mellow synthesizers and piano and soul-sparked horns. The insanity is in slow motion, slowly feeling natural. No other recent gangsta rap has had that power."

== Track listing ==
| No. | Title | Writer(s) | Length |
|---|---|---|---|
| 1. | "Niggaz That Kill" (Endolude) | Aaron Tyler; Terry Keith Allen | 2:32 |
| 2. | "Def Wish III" (Intro) | Aaron Tyler; Terry Keith Allen | 0:57 |
| 3. | "Def Wish III" (featuring Carla Evans) | Aaron Tyler; Terry Keith Allen | 4:23 |
| 4. | "Take 2 with Me" | Aaron Tyler; Terry Keith Allen | 4:44 |
| 5. | "All for the Money" | Aaron Tyler; Paul Edward Richmond; Darryl Cortez Ellis; Ruben Locke Jr. | 4:08 |
| 6. | "Compton Cyco" | Aaron Tyler; Terry Keith Allen | 3:02 |
| 7. | "Niggaz Make the Hood Go Round" | Aaron Tyler | 4:09 |
| 8. | "Nuthin' But High" (Endolude) | Aaron Tyler; William Fredric Zimmerman | 3:26 |
| 9. | "We Come Strapped" | Aaron Tyler; Terry Keith Allen | 4:08 |
| 10. | "Can I Still Kill It" | Aaron Tyler; Terry Keith Allen | 3:40 |
| 11. | "Goin' Out Like Geez" | Aaron Tyler; Terry Keith Allen | 4:39 |
| 12. | "Nuthin' but the Gangsta" (featuring Spice 1 and Redman) | Aaron Tyler; Reginald Noble; Robert L. Green Jr.; Terry Keith Allen | 5:13 |
| 13. | "Hard Times" | Aaron Tyler; Terry Keith Allen | 4:08 |
| 14. | "Compton Bomb" | Aaron Tyler; Alaric "Rick" Simon; Terry Keith Allen | 5:11 |
| 15. | "2 tha Westside" (Endolude) | Aaron Tyler; Terry Keith Allen | 3:32 |
| Total length: | | | 57:52 |

Sample credits

- "All for the Money" contains a sample of "In the Mood" performed by Tyrone Davis.

== Personnel ==
- Aaron Tyler – main artist, vocals, keyboards (tracks: 1, 2), producer (tracks: 1–13, 15), co-producer (track 14), arranger, executive producer
- Terry Keith Allen – main artist, keyboards (tracks: 6, 14), producer (tracks: 1–13, 15), co-producer (track 14), arranger, engineering
- Michael Bryant – scratches (track 6)
- Reginald Noble – featured artist, vocals (track 12)
- Robert L. Green Jr. – featured artist, vocals (track 12)
- Carla Evans – vocals (track 3)
- William "Willie Z" Zimmerman – keyboards (tracks: 1–5, 7–13, 15), co-arranger
- Josh Achziger – guitar (track 14), assistant engineering
- Alaric "Rick" Simon – producer (track 14)
- Alan Yoshida – mastering
- Cheryl Dickerson – A&R direction
- Peter Dokus – art direction, photography
- Rom Anthonis – design

== Charts ==
| Chart (1994) | Peak position |
|---|---|
| US Billboard 200 | 5 |
| US Top R&B/Hip-Hop Albums (Billboard) | 1 |

== Certifications ==
| Region | Certification | Certified units/sales |
|---|---|---|
| United States (RIAA) | Gold | 500,000^{^} |
^{^} Shipments figures based on certification alone.

== See also ==
- List of number-one R&B albums of 1994 (U.S.)
