= Veterans Day (album) =

Studio album by MC Eiht
- Released: September 28, 2004
- Genre: West Coast hip-hop; gangsta rap
- Length: 52:16
- Label: Native
- Producer: Kenneth M. Smith (exec.); MC Eiht (also exec.); Tha Chill; Tha Boomdocz; Prodeje

MC Eiht chronology
The Pioneers (2004)	Veterans Day (2004)	The New Season (2006)

Professional ratings
Review scores
Source	Rating
AllHipHop	4/5 stars
AllMusic	4/5 stars
RapReviews	7.5/10

Veterans Day is the tenth studio album by American rapper MC Eiht. It was released on September 28, 2004, via Native Records. The album was produced by tha Boomdocz, tha Chill, Prodeje, and MC Eiht, who also served as executive producer with Kenneth M. Smith. It features guest appearances from tha Chill. The album peaked at number 70 on the Billboard Top R&B/Hip-Hop Albums chart in the United States.

== Track listing ==
No.	Title	Producer(s)	Length
1.	"Vets Day Intro"	Tha Boomdocz; Tha Chill	1:32
2.	"Streets Don't Love U"	Tha Boomdocz; Tha Chill; MC Eiht (co.)	4:23
3.	"It's Alright"	Tha Boomdocz; Tha Chill	4:11
4.	"Pink Is 4 Honeys"	Tha Boomdocz; Tha Chill	0:33
5.	"U Know Why" (featuring tha Chill)	Tha Boomdocz; Tha Chill	3:48
6.	"Gangsta Smash"	Tha Boomdocz; Tha Chill	3:38
7.	"Wrong Attire"	Tha Boomdocz; Tha Chill	0:46
8.	"Living Like G'staz"	Tha Boomdocz; Tha Chill; MC Eiht (co.)	4:35
9.	"Some of These Thugs"	Tha Boomdocz; Tha Chill	4:13
10.	"We Heated"	Prodeje	1:33
11.	"Somebody" (featuring tha Chill)	Tha Boomdocz; Tha Chill; MC Eiht (co.)	3:44
12.	"We Made It '04" (featuring tha Chill)	Tha Boomdocz; Tha Chill; MC Eiht (co.)	4:17
13.	"Bac in Town"	Tha Boomdocz; Tha Chill	3:25
14.	"Wavin the Pistol"	Tha Boomdocz; Tha Chill	4:23
15.	"Get Yo Grind On (Garage Mix)"	Tha Boomdocz; Tha Chill	3:33
16.	"Nobody Beat Us"	Tha Boomdocz; Tha Chill	3:42
Total length:			52:16

== Personnel ==
- Aaron "MC Eiht" Tyler – vocals, co-producer (tracks: 2, 8, 11, 13), executive producer
- Vernon "Tha Chill" Johnson – vocals (tracks: 5, 11, 12), producer (tracks: 1–9, 11–16)
- Tha Boomdocz – producers (tracks: 1–9, 11–16)
- Austin "Prodeje" Patterson – producer (track 10)
- David "Rhythm D" Weldon – mixing
- Hector Delgado – mixing
- Geoff Gibbs – mixing
- Bob Lanzner – mastering
- Bill Dooley – mastering
- Kenneth M. Smith – executive producer
- Donald Baker – art direction

== Charts ==
Chart (2004)	Peak position
US Top R&B/Hip-Hop Albums (Billboard)	70
