= Tha8t'z Gangsta =

Studio album by MC Eiht
- Released: May 8, 2001
- Recorded: 2000–01
- Studio: 6 Point Productions
- Genre: West Coast hip-hop; gangsta rap
- Length: 1:03:29
- Label: Half-Ounce
- Producer: MC Eiht (also exec.); Binky Mack; tha Chill; Dâm-Funk; Raw Steele; Young Tre

MC Eiht chronology
N' My Neighborhood (2000)	Tha8t'z Gangsta (2001)	Underground Hero (2002)

Tha8t'z Gangsta is the sixth studio album by American rapper MC Eiht. It was released on May 8, 2001, via Half-Ounce Records. The recording sessions took place at 6 Point Productions Studio and Dedal Recordings. The album was produced by Binky Mack, tha Chill, Dâm-Funk, DJ Raw Steele, Young Trey, and MC Eiht, who also served as executive producer. It peaked at number 75 on the Billboard Top R&B/Hip-Hop Albums chart in the United States.

== Track listing ==
No.	Title	Writer(s)	Producer(s)	Length
1.	"Holla"	Aaron Tyler; N. Steele	DJ Raw Steel	4:43
2.	"Rule #1"	Tyler; Vernon Johnson	Tha Chill	4:19
3.	"Why U Hott?"	Tyler; Johnson	Tha Chill	4:22
4.	"Hustle Man"	Tyler; Treyvon Green	Young Tre	4:39
5.	"Bacdafuconup"	Tyler; Steele	DJ Raw Steel	3:22
6.	"Like This Like That"	Tyler; Johnson	Tha Chill	4:37
7.	"Can I?"	Tyler; Green	Young Tre	3:50
8.	"We Get It"	Tyler; Ryan Gardner; Damon Garrett Riddick	Binky Mack; Dâm-Funk; MC Eiht	3:58
9.	"Gangsta"	Tyler; Gardner; Riddick	Binky Mack; Dâm-Funk; MC Eiht	4:36
10.	"Look Up"	Tyler; Gardner	Binky Mack	4:36
11.	"What We About"	Tyler; Gardner	Binky Mack	3:47
12.	"Everybody Move"	Tyler; Steele	DJ Raw Steel	3:47
13.	"All Day Everyday"	Tyler; Johnson	Tha Chill	4:17
14.	"Drama"	Tyler; Gardner; Riddick	Binky Mack; Dâm-Funk; MC Eiht	4:11
15.	"2 Freak E"	Tyler; Riddick	Dâm-Funk	4:25
Total length:				1:03:29

Sample credits

- Track 15 contains replayed elements of "She's Just a Groupie" as recorded by Bobby Nunn

== Personnel ==
- Aaron "MC Eiht" Tyler – vocals, producer (tracks: 8, 9, 14), executive producer
- Damon "Dâm-Funk" Riddick – keyboards (tracks: 10, 11, 15), producer (tracks: 8, 9, 14, 15)
- Ryan "Binky" Gardner – producer (tracks: 8–11, 14)
- Vernon "Tha Chill" Johnson – producer (tracks: 2, 3, 6, 13)
- N. "Raw Steel" Steele – producer (tracks: 1, 5, 12)
- Treyvon "Young Tre" Green – producer (tracks: 4, 7)
- Rashad Coes – mixing
- Kris Solem – mastering
- Omar Guzman – art direction, design
- Liza Orozco – photography

== Charts ==
Chart (2001)	Peak position
US Top R&B/Hip-Hop Albums (Billboard)	75
