= 187 He Wrote =

Studio album by Spice 1
- Released: September 28, 1993
- Recorded: 1992–1993
- Genre: Gangsta rap
- Length: 61:13
- Label: Jive
- Producers: Ant Banks; CMT; DJ Xtra Large; E-A-Ski; Jonny Z; MC Eiht; Mentally Blunted; Prodeje; Too $hort

Spice 1 chronology
Spice 1 (1992)	187 He Wrote (1993)	AmeriKKKa's Nightmare (1994)

Singles from 187 He Wrote
- 1. "Dumpin' Em in Ditches" Released: 1993; 2. "The Murda Show" Released: 1994

Professional ratings
Review scores
Source	Rating
AllMusic	4/5 stars
RapReviews	8.5/10
Rolling Stone	2/5 stars

187 He Wrote is the second studio album by the American rapper Spice 1. The album was released on September the 28th, 1993 via Jive Records. It was produced by E-A-Ski, CMT, Mentally Blunted, Prodeje, Too $hort, Ant Banks, Jonny Z, MC Eiht and D.J. Xtra Large with Chaz Hayes and 187 Fac being the Executive Producers. While guest appearances include Bo$$ and MC Eiht with contributions from G-Nut, Ant Banks, E-40, Havoc & Prodeje, Havikk and Nuttin' Nyce

== Commercial Promformance ==
The album peaked at number 10 on the Billboard 200 and topped the Top R&B/Hip-Hop Albums charts in the United States. It was certified gold on November 30, 1993, by the Recording Industry Association of America for selling 500,000 units in the US alone. Its lead single, "Dumpin' Em in Ditches", made it to No. 34 on the Hot Dance Singles Sales and No. 79 on the Hot R&B/Hip-Hop Songs charts in the United States. The second single off of the album, "The Murda Show", reached No. 50 on the Hot Rap Songs chart.

== Track listing ==
No.	Title	Writer(s)	Producer(s)	Length
1.	"I'm the Fuckin' Murder"	Robert L. Green Jr.; Austin Patterson	Prodeje	3:33
2.	"Dumpin' Em in Ditches"	Green Jr.; Shon Adams; Mark Ogleton	E-A-Ski; CMT	4:05
3.	"Gas Chamber"	Green Jr.; Todd Shaw	Too $hort	3:18
4.	"187 He Wrote"	Green Jr.; Gentry Reed	Mentally Blunted	4:52
5.	"Don't Ring the Alarm (The Heist)" (with Bo$$)	Green Jr.; Lichelle Laws; Reed	Mentally Blunted	4:04
6.	"Clip & the Trigga"	Green Jr.; Anthony Banks	Ant Banks	5:21
7.	"Smoke 'Em Like a Blunt"	Green Jr.; Shaw	Too $hort	4:14
8.	"The Murda Show" (with MC Eiht)	Green Jr.; Aaron Tyler	MC Eiht	4:27
9.	"380 on Dat Ass"	Green Jr.; Patterson	Prodeje	4:20
10.	"Mo' Mail"	Green Jr.; John Zunino; R. Bryant	Jonny Z	4:30
11.	"Runnin' out da Crackhouse"	Green Jr.; Adams; Ogleton	E-A-Ski; CMT	3:18
12.	"Trigga Gots No Heart"	Green Jr.; Adams; Ogleton	E-A-Ski; CMT	3:07
13.	"Trigga Happy"	Green Jr.; K. Turner	Xtra-Large	3:11
14.	"RIP"	Green Jr.; Adams; Ogleton	E-A-Ski; CMT	3:50
15.	"All He Wrote"	Green Jr.; Reed	Mentally Blunted	5:03
Total length:				1:01:13

Sample credits

- Track 1 contains a sample of "High Powered" written by Ricardo Brown, Eric Collins, Calvin Broadus, Andre Young and Tracy Lynn Curry as performed by Dr. Dre.
- Track 4 contains a sample of "Sweet Moments" written by Barry White and Gene Page as performed by the Love Unlimited Orchestra.
- Track 6 contains a sample of "Dukey's Stick" written by George Duke.

== Personnel ==
- Robert L. "Spice 1" Green Jr. — vocals, arrangement
- Lichelle "Bo$$" Laws — additional vocals (track 5)
- Anthony "Ant" Banks — additional vocals & producer (track 6), mixing & engineering (tracks: 3, 6, 7)
- Gregory "G-Nut" Brown — background vocals (track 6), additional vocals (tracks: 7, 15), executive producer
- Aaron "MC Eiht" Tyler — additional vocals & producer (track 8)
- Austin "Prodeje" Patterson — additional vocals (track 9), producer (tracks: 1, 9)
- Cary "Havoc" Calvin — additional vocals (track 9)
- Brian "Havikk The Rhime Son" West — additional vocals (track 9)
- Earl "E-40" Stevens — additional vocals (track 10)
- Nuttin' Nyce — additional vocals (track 13)
- Robert "Fonksta" Bacon — guitar (tracks: 1, 9)
- Shon "E-A-Ski" Adams — producer & mixing (tracks: 2, 11, 12, 14), keyboard and drum programming & engineering (track 12)
- Mark "CMT" Ogleton — producer & mixing (tracks: 2, 11, 12, 14), keyboard and drum programming & engineering (track 12)
- Todd "Too $hort" Shaw — producer (tracks: 3, 7)
- Gentry "Black Jack" Reed — producer (tracks: 4, 5, 15), mixing (tracks: 5, 15)
- John "Jonny Z" Zunino — producer, mixing & engineering (track 10)
- K. "DJ Xtra-Large" Turner — producer & mixing (track 13)
- Sean Freehill — mixing & engineering (tracks: 1, 9)
- Pat Coughlin — engineering (tracks: 2, 10, 14)
- Matt Kelley — recording (tracks: 4, 5), mixing (tracks: 5, 15), engineering (track 15)
- Tim Latham — mixing (tracks: 4, 13), recording (tracks: 5, 13)
- Adam Kudzin — mixing (tracks: 4, 13), recording (tracks: 5, 13)
- Dave "D-Wiz" Evelingham — mixing & engineering (track 8)
- Terry "DJ Slip" Allen — mixing (track 8)
- Dennis "Den Fen" Thomas — executive producer
- Chaz Hayes — executive producer, management
- Victor Hall — photography
- Jeremy Dawson — photo illustration

== Charts ==
=== Weekly charts ===
Chart (1993)	Peak position
US Billboard 200	10
US Top R&B Albums (Billboard)	1

=== Year-end charts ===
Chart (1993)	Position
US Top R&B/Hip-Hop Albums (Billboard)	42
Chart (1994)	Position
US Top R&B/Hip-Hop Albums (Billboard)	73

== Certifications ==
Region	Certification	Certified units/sales
United States (RIAA)	Gold	500,000^{^}
^{^} Shipments figures based on certification alone.

== See also ==
- List of Billboard number-one R&B albums of 1993
