= Keep It Hood =

EP by MC Eiht
- Released: January 4, 2013
- Genre: Hip hop
- Length: 22:18
- Label: Blue Stamp Music Group
- Producer: 808 (exec.); Brenk Sinatra

MC Eiht chronology
The Best of MC Eiht (2010)	Keep It Hood (2013)	Which Way Iz West (2017)

Keep It Hood is an extended play by American rapper MC Eiht of Compton's Most Wanted. It was released on January 4, 2013 via Blue Stamp Music Group, and served as prelude to Which Way Iz West. The production of the entire EP was handled by Austrian record producer Brenk Sinatra with executive producer 808. It features scratches from DJ Premier, who mixed and mastered the album.

A sequel to the album titled Keep It Hood Part 2 was supposed to be released in 2018.

== Track listing ==
No.	Title	Length
1.	"Where U Goin' 2"	3:42
2.	"The Reign"	3:37
3.	"Bigg"	2:43
4.	"811"	2:36
5.	"Blue Stamp"	3:45
6.	"Let's Do This"	2:27
7.	"Make Me Some Mo"	3:28
