= Section 8 (album) =

Studio album by MC Eiht
- Released: June 8, 1999
- Recorded: 1998–1999
- Genre: West Coast hip-hop; gangsta rap
- Length: 59:30
- Label: Hoo-Bangin'; Priority
- Producer: Binky Mack; MC Eiht; DJ Raw Steel; Young Tre; Ant Banks; Bird; Black Hole; DJ Slip; Fredwreck; Julio G

MC Eiht chronology
Last Man Standing (1997)	Section 8 (1999)	N' My Neighborhood (2000)

Singles from Section 8
- 1. "Automatic" Released: May 4, 1999; 2. "Thicker than Water" Released: 1999

Professional ratings
Review scores
Source	Rating
AllMusic	4/5 stars
The Source	3/5 stars

Section 8 is the fourth studio album by American rapper MC Eiht. It was released on June 8, 1999, through Hoo-Bangin' Records and Priority Records. The album was produced by Ant Banks, DJ Slip, Fredwreck, Julio G, and MC Eiht, with Hoo-Bangin' Records founder Mack 10 serving as executive producer. It features guest performances from Ice Cube, High "T", Mack 10, Soultre, Techniec, Val Young, and CMW.

The album peaked at number 54 on the Billboard 200 and at number 5 on the Top R&B/Hip-Hop Albums chart in the United States. Its lead single, "Automatic", made it to number 62 on the Hot R&B/Hip-Hop Songs and number 6 on the Hot Rap Songs.

Along with a single, a music video was produced for "Automatic". The song "Thicker Than Water" was originally heard in Richard Cummings Jr.'s 1999 film Thicker than Water and was also released as a single and a music video to promote the film's soundtrack.

== Track listing ==
No.	Title	Producer(s)	Length
1.	"Section 8" (Intro)	Binky Mack; MC Eiht	0:53
2.	"Living n' tha Streetz" (featuring Boom Bam)	Young Tre	4:44
3.	"My Life"	Young Tre	4:54
4.	"Murder at Night"	Ant Banks	4:23
5.	"Caution"	Bird	4:42
6.	"The Getaway" (Skit)		0:26
7.	"Automatic"	Fredwreck; Julio G.	4:15
8.	"Strawberriez -n- Cream" (featuring High "T" and Compton's Most Wanted)	DJ Raw Steel; MC Eiht	5:19
9.	"Flatline"	DJ Raw Steel; MC Eiht	4:33
10.	"Dayz of 89'"	DJ Slip	4:48
11.	"Tha Hood Still Got Me Under" (featuring Soultre)	Binky Mack	4:41
12.	"Me & My Bitch" (featuring Techniec)	Binky Mack; J!	4:20
13.	"Ill tha Hood Way" (featuring Mack 10 & Ice Cube)	Binky Mack	4:27
14.	"Thicker Than Water" (featuring Val Young)	Black Hole	4:22
15.	"Tha Nail Shop" (Luther's Outro)		2:43
Total length:			59:30

== Samples ==
Dayz of 89'

- "You Are My Starship" by Norman Connors

Flatline

- "Sweet Moments" by the Love Unlimited Orchestra

Me & My Bitch

- "Rain Dance" by the Jeff Lorber Fusion

My Life

- "Everybody Loves the Sunshine" by Roy Ayers
- "Everyday" by Jamiroquai
- "In the Mood" by Tyrone Davis

Thicker Than Water

- "If You Play Your Cards Right" by Alicia Myers

== Chart history ==
Chart (1999)	Peak position
US Billboard 200	54
US Top R&B/Hip-Hop Albums (Billboard)	5
