= Death Threatz =

Studio album by MC Eiht featuring CMW
- Released: April 9, 1996
- Studio: Echo Sound; X Factor (Los Angeles, California)
- Genre: West Coast hip-hop; G-funk; gangsta rap
- Length: 1:11:58
- Label: Epic Street
- Producer: MC Eiht (also exec.); DJ Slip; Prodeje; Blackjack; Tomie Mundy (co.); Robert "Fonksta" Bacon (co.)

MC Eiht chronology
We Come Strapped (1994)	Death Threatz (1996)	Last Man Standing (1997)

Compton's Most Wanted chronology
We Come Strapped (1994)	Death Threatz (1996)	Represent (2000)

Singles from Death Threatz
- 1. "Thuggin It Up" Released: 1996

Professional ratings
Review scores
Source	Rating
RapReviews	7.5/10
The Source	3.5/5 stars

Death Threatz is the second studio album by American rapper MC Eiht. It was released on April 9, 1996, through Epic Street. The recording sessions took place at Echo Sound and X-Factor Studios in Los Angeles. The album was produced by Compton's Most Wanted members DJ Slip and MC Eiht, along with Prodeje of South Central Cartel, Gentry "Black Jack" Reed, Robert "Fonksta" Bacon, and Tomie Mundy. It features guest performances from Young Prodeje and N.O.T.R.

The album peaked at number 16 on the Billboard 200 and at number 3 on the Top R&B/Hip-Hop Albums chart in the United States. It spawned two uncharted singles: a lead single "Thuggin It Up" and a promotional single "You Can't See Me" which both featured music videos.

== Track listing ==
No.	Title	Lyrics	Producer(s)	Length
1.	"Def Wish IV (Tap That Azz)"	A. Tyler	Prodeje; Tomie Mundy (co.); Robert "Fonksta" Bacon (co.)	5:34
2.	"Ain't Nuthin 2 It"	A. Tyler	MC Eiht; DJ Slip (co.)	5:14
3.	"Killin Nigguz" (featuring N.O.T.R.)	A. Tyler; V. Johnson; G. Heisser	MC Eiht; DJ Slip (co.)	5:26
4.	"Run 4 Your Life"	A. Tyler	Prodeje; Tomie Mundy (co.); Robert "Fonksta" Bacon (co.)	4:38
5.	"Endoness"	A. Tyler	Blackjack	4:41
6.	"Thuggin It Up"	A. Tyler	MC Eiht	4:06
7.	"Love 4 the Hood" (featuring Da Foe)	A. Tyler	Prodeje; Tomie Mundy (co.); Robert "Fonksta" Bacon (co.)	4:54
8.	"Fuc Em All" (featuring Havoc The Mouthpiece)	A. Tyler	Blackjack	4:32
9.	"Late Nite Hype Part 2"	A. Tyler	DJ Slip	4:35
10.	"Set Trippin" (featuring Boom Bam of N.O.T.R.)	A. Tyler; G. Heisser	MC Eiht; DJ Slip (co.)	5:12
11.	"Collect My Stripez" (featuring Young Prodeje)	A. Tyler; P. Pitts	Prodeje; Tomie Mundy (co.); Robert "Fonksta" Bacon (co.)	4:34
12.	"Fuc Your Hood"	A. Tyler	MC Eiht; DJ Slip (co.)	4:52
13.	"You Can't See Me" (featuring Tha Chill of N.O.T.R.)	A. Tyler; V. Johnson	DJ Slip	4:21
14.	"Drugs & Killin"	A. Tyler	MC Eiht; DJ Slip (co.)	4:21
15.	"Killin Season"	A. Tyler	DJ Slip	4:58
Total length:				1:11:58

== Personnel ==
- Aaron Tyler – main artist, vocals, keyboards (tracks: 2, 3, 6, 12, 14), producer (tracks: 2, 3, 6, 10, 12, 14), executive producer
- Terry Keith Allen – main artist, producer (tracks: 9, 13, 15), co-producer (tracks: 2, 3, 10, 12, 14)
- Michael Bryant – scratches (track 15)
- Gene Heisser – featured artist, vocals (tracks: 3, 10)
- Vernon Johnson – featured artist, vocals (tracks: 3, 13)
- Patrick Earl Pitts – featured artist, vocals (track 11)
- Cary Calvin – vocals (track 8)
- Da Foe – featured artist (track 7)
- William Fredric Zimmerman – keyboards (tracks: 2, 3, 6, 9, 12–14)
- Austin Patterson – producer (tracks: 1, 4, 7, 11)
- Gentry Reed – producer (tracks: 5, 8)
- Robert Bacon Jr. – co-producer (tracks: 1, 4, 7, 11)
- Tomie Mundy – co-producer (tracks: 1, 4, 7, 11)
- Alan Yoshida – mastering
- Ted Lowe – A&R
- Dante Ariola – art direction
- Jay Papke – art direction
- Christopher McCann – photography
- Stephen Stickler – photography

== Charts ==
Chart (1996)	Peak position
US Billboard 200	16
US Top R&B/Hip-Hop Albums (Billboard)	3
