= Last Man Standing (MC Eiht album) =

Studio album by MC Eiht
- Released: November 11, 1997
- Recorded: 1997
- Studio: Echo Sound (Los Angeles, California); Skip Saylor Recording (Los Angeles, California); Track Record (North Hollywood, California); X Factor Studios; Half Oz. Studios
- Genre: West Coast hip-hop; gangsta rap
- Length: 1:17:23
- Label: Epic Street
- Producer: MC Eiht (also exec.); DJ Slip; DJ Muggs; Daz Dillinger; Massive

MC Eiht chronology
Death Threatz (1996)	Last Man Standing (1997)	Section 8 (1999)

Professional ratings
Review scores
Source	Rating
AllMusic	2/5 stars
The Source	3/5 stars

Last Man Standing is the third studio album by American rapper MC Eiht. It was released on November 11, 1997, through Epic Street. The recording sessions took place at X Factor Studios, Echo Sound, Half Oz. Studios, Skip Saylor Recording, and Track Record in California. The album was produced by MC Eiht, DJ Slip, DJ Muggs, Massive, and Daz Dillinger. It features guest appearances from Boom Bam, Big Nasty, B-Real, Da Foe, Daz Dillinger, Hie Tiimes, Lil' Hawk, and Mon-Diggi. The album peaked at number 64 on the Billboard 200 and at number 13 on the Top R&B/Hip-Hop Albums chart in the United States.

== Track listing ==
No.	Title	Writer(s)	Producer(s)	Length
1.	"Under Attack" (featuring Boom Bam)	A. Tyler; T. Allen; G. Heisser	DJ Slip	4:03
2.	"Kind of Pimpish"	A. Tyler; M. Ford	Massive	4:37
3.	"Me & My Bitch" (featuring Hie Tiimes)	A. Tyler; C. McMillian; L. Graham; R. Locke; D. Ellis; T. Allen	DJ Slip; MC Eiht (co.)	5:00
4.	"Can I Get Mine"	C. King; G. Goffin; A. Tyler; L. Muggerud	DJ Muggs	3:04
5.	"Compton 4 Death"	A. Tyler; T. Allen	MC Eiht; DJ Slip (co.)	4:42
6.	"Tha Business" (featuring Da Foe, Lil' Hawk & Big Nasty)	A. Tyler; C. Flemming; M. Burns; N. Franklin; T. Allen	MC Eiht; DJ Slip (co.)	4:46
7.	"Any Meanz"	A. Tyler; T. Allen	DJ Slip; MC Eiht	4:33
8.	"Tough Guyz" (featuring Boom Bam & Mon-Diggi)	A. Tyler; T. Allen; G. Heisser	DJ Slip	4:09
9.	"Got Cha Humpin'"	C. Fischer; A. Tyler; L. Muggerud	DJ Muggs	4:11
10.	"Hit the Floor" (featuring Daz Dillinger)	D. Arnaud; A. Tyler	Daz Dillinger	4:31
11.	"Who's tha Man"	A. Tyler; T. Allen	MC Eiht; DJ Slip (co.)	4:21
12.	"Tha Way We Run It" (featuring B-Real)	A. Tyler; L. Muggerud	DJ Muggs	3:51
13.	"Anything U Want"	A. Tyler; T. Allen	MC Eiht; DJ Slip (co.)	4:04
14.	"Hangin'"	A. Tyler; T. Allen; C. MacIntosh; S. Nichol; J. Peters	DJ Slip; MC Eiht	4:17
15.	"When All Hell Breaks Loose"	A. Tyler; L. Muggerud	DJ Muggs	3:50
16.	"Hubtouchablez"	A. Tyler	MC Eiht	4:49
17.	"On Top of All That"	A. Tyler; T. Allen	DJ Slip; MC Eiht	3:56
18.	"Return Fire"	A. Tyler; T. Allen	MC Eiht; DJ Slip (co.)	4:39
Total length:				1:17:23

Sample credits

- Track 3 contains a sample from "Be with Me" written by Leo Graham, Ruben Locke Jr. and Darryl Cortez Ellis, as recorded by Tyrone Davis
- Track 4 contains a sample from "Hey Girl" written by Carole King and Gerry Goffin, as recorded by Cornell Dupree
- Track 9 contains a sample from "Morning" written by Clare Fischer, as recorded by Donald Byrd
- Track 14 contains a sample from "Hangin' on a String (Contemplating)" written by Carl McIntosh, Steve Nichol and J. Peters, as recorded by Loose Ends

== Personnel ==
- Aaron Tyler – main artist, keyboards (track 6), programming (track 14), producer (tracks: 5–7, 11, 13, 14, 16–18), co-producer (track 3), executive producer, mixing (tracks: 1–3, 5–8, 11, 13, 14, 16–18)
- Gene Heisser – featured artist (tracks: 1, 8)
- Hie Tiimes – featured artist (track 3)
- Da Foe – featured artist (track 6)
- Lil' Hawk – featured artist (track 6)
- Big Nasty – featured artist (track 6)
- Mon-Diggi – featured artist (track 8)
- Delmar Drew Arnaud – featured artist & producer (track 10)
- Louis Freese – featured artist (track 12)
- Terry Keith Allen – keyboards (tracks: 1, 17), guitar programming (track 6), programming (track 14), producer (tracks: 1, 3, 7, 8, 14, 17), co-producer (tracks: 5, 6, 11, 13, 18), engineering (tracks: 1–3, 5–8, 11, 13, 14, 16–18)
- M. "Massive" Ford – keyboards & producer (track 2)
- William Fredric Zimmerman – keyboards (tracks: 5–7, 11, 13, 16–18)
- Priest "Soopafly" Brooks – keyboards (track 10)
- Horace "Bokie" Coleman – guitar (tracks: 3, 8, 11, 13, 17, 18), bass (track 3)
- Lawrence Muggerud – producer & mixing (tracks: 4, 9, 12, 15)
- Don L. Bartholomew – mixing (tracks: 1–3, 5–8, 11, 13, 14, 16–18)
- Dave Aron – mixing (track 10)
- Tony Robert Alvarez – engineering (tracks: 1–3, 5–8, 11, 13, 14, 16–18)
- Joe Warlick – engineering (tracks: 4, 9, 12, 15)
- Peter Dokus – art direction, photography
- Giulio Costanzo – design
- Ted Lowe – A&R
- John W. Smith – management
- Kenneth M. Smith – management

== Charts ==
Chart (1997)	Peak position
US Billboard 200	64
US Top R&B/Hip-Hop Albums (Billboard)	13
