= Dumpin' Em in Ditches =

Single by Spice 1

from the album 187 He Wrote
- Released: August 30, 1993
- Recorded: 1993
- Genre: Gangsta Rap
- Length: 4:06
- Label: Jive Records
- Songwriters: Spice 1, S. Adams, M. Ogleton
- Producers: E-A-Ski, CMT

Dumpin' Em In Ditches (Spelt on the cover Dumpin' 'Em In Ditches) is a song from the album 187 He Wrote which was released on September the 28th, 1993 on Jive Records but was released as a single on Augest the 30th, 1993. The song was later included on the first Spice 1's greatest hits album Hits in 1998.

== Music Video ==
A music video was also released for the song. The Music video features Spice 1 being portrayed as a Made-Man/Gangster interspersed with various clips from the 1930s and 40s gangster movies.

== Commercial Profromance ==
The song reached #34 on the Hot Dance Music/Maxi-Singles Sales chart and #79 on the Hot R&B/Hip-Hop Singles & Tracks chart.
