= Niggaz on tha Run =

American gangsta rap group

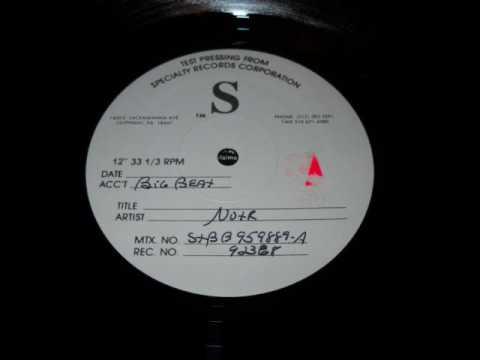
- N.O.T.R. vinyl test pressing

Background information
- Also known as: N.O.T.R.
- Origin: W 159th St, Tragniew Park, Compton, California, U.S.
- Genres: Gangsta rap, West Coast hip hop
- Years active: 1993–1996
- Labels: Big Beat, Specialty

Niggaz on tha Run (N.O.T.R.) was a 1990s gangsta rap group from Compton, California. They were formed by MC Eiht and mainly featured his long-time friends and members of Compton's Most Wanted, DJ Slip, Tha Chill and Boom Bam.

== Background ==
They formed in 1993 and were due to release an EP in early '94, but it was cancelled a few months prior. Very rare record test pressings are all that remain, however, several tracks have been uploaded to YouTube. (see referenced playlist) They were heavily involved with MC Eiht featuring C.M.W.'s 1994 & '96 albums, We Come Strapped & Death Threatz.
