= Which Way Iz West =

Album by MC Eiht

Studio album by MC Eiht
- Released: June 30, 2017
- Genre: West Coast hip-hop; gangsta rap; G-funk
- Length: 56:23
- Label: Year Round; Blue Stamp Music; EMPIRE
- Producer: DJ Premier (also exec.); MC Eiht (exec.); Brenk Sinatra

MC Eiht chronology
Keep It Hood (2013)	Which Way Iz West (2017)	Official (2020)

Singles from Which Way Iz West
- 1. "Runn the Blocc" Released: October 26, 2016; 2. "Represent Like This" Released: April 28, 2017; 3. "Compton Zoo" Released: June 2, 2017; 4. "Got That" Released: June 16, 2017

Professional ratings
Review scores
Source	Rating
HipHopDX	4.0/5
Pitchfork	7.1/10

Which Way Iz West is the thirteenth studio album by American rapper MC Eiht. It was released on June 30, 2017, through Year Round Records and Blue Stamp Music. The album features guest appearances from WC, B-Real, the Lady of Rage, Bumpy Knuckles, Kurupt, Xzibit, Outlawz and his group Compton's Most Wanted, among others. The album is executively produced by DJ Premier, and features production from Austrian producer Brenk Sinatra.

== Track listing ==
No.	Title	Producer	Length
1.	"Shut Em Down" (featuring Outlawz)	Brenk Sinatra	3:50
2.	"Represent Like This" (featuring WC)	Brenk Sinatra	3:23
3.	"Compton Zoo"	Brenk Sinatra	2:45
4.	"Heart Cold" (featuring the Lady of Rage)	Brenk Sinatra	3:04
5.	"Pass Me By" (featuring B-Real)	Brenk Sinatra	3:40
6.	"Runn the Blocc" (featuring Maylay)	DJ Premier	4:13
7.	"Gangsta Gangsta" (featuring Kurupt)	Brenk Sinatra	6:13
8.	"Got That" (featuring DJ Premier)	Brenk Sinatra & DJ Premier	3:40
9.	"Medicate" (featuring Xzibit)	Brenk Sinatra	2:44
10.	"Born to Hustle" (featuring Big Mike and J Starr)	Brenk Sinatra	3:46
11.	"Sittin' Around Smokin'"	Brenk Sinatra	3:22
12.	"As I Proceed"	Brenk Sinatra	3:17
13.	"Last Ones Left" (featuring Compton's Most Wanted)	DJ Premier	4:45
14.	"4 tha OG'z" (featuring Bumpy Knuckles)	DJ Premier	3:37
15.	"You Nia'z"	Brenk Sinatra	4:04
Total length:			56:23

== Charts ==
Chart (2017)	Peak position
US Independent Albums (Billboard)	29
