= Hood Arrest =

Studio album by MC Eiht
- Released: June 2, 2003
- Recorded: 2003
- Genre: West Coast hip-hop
- Length: 47:10
- Label: Lookin Up Entertainment
- Producer: MC Eiht, DJ Slip

MC Eiht chronology
Underground Hero (2002)	Hood Arrest (2003)	The Pioneers (2004)

Hood Arrest is the eighth studio album by American rapper MC Eiht, released June 2, 2003 on Lookin Up Entertainment. It features a bonus DVD.

== Track listing ==
1. "Intro" – 0:29
2. "Bring Back the Funk" – 4:12
3. "Dead Money" – 4:29
4. "I'm a G" – 4:35
5. "New Shit True Shit" – 4:18
6. "Hustle 4 Doe" – 3:55
7. "Nothing to Loose" – 4:21
8. "Struggle" – 4:13
9. "Welcome Back to the Ghetto" – 4:19 (featuring Spice 1)
10. "Make Some Dough" – 4:15
11. "It's Your Life" – 4:24
12. "We Gots to Work" – 3:40
