= Underground Hero =

Studio album by MC Eiht
- Released: July 2, 2002
- Recorded: 2002
- Studio: Mad Hatter (Hollywood, CA)
- Genre: West Coast hip-hop; gangsta rap
- Length: 47:57
- Label: D3 Entertainment
- Producer: Big Resse; Daven the Mad Hatter; Mr. Tony; Narcotic; Nic & Tone; the Platinum Brothers; Young Tre

MC Eiht chronology
Tha8t'z Gangsta (2001)	Underground Hero (2002)	Hood Arrest (2003)

Professional ratings
Review scores
Source	Rating
AllMusic	2.5/5 stars
HipHopDX	3.5/5

Underground Hero is the seventh studio album by American rapper MC Eiht. It was released on July 2, 2002, via D3/Riviera Entertainment. The recording sessions took place at Mad Hatter Studios in Hollywood. The album was produced by Big Resse, Daven the Mad Hatter, Mr. Tony, Narcotic, Nic & Tone, the Platinum Brothers, and Young Tre. It features guest appearances from Mack 10, Sticky Fingaz, Yukmouth, and the Outlawz. The album peaked at number 54 on the Billboard Top R&B/Hip-Hop Albums and number 23 on the Independent Albums chart in the United States.

== Track listing ==
All tracks are written by Aaron Tyler.

No.	Title	Producer(s)	Length
1.	"The Bomb Eiht"	Mr Tony & Narcotic	0:58
2.	"Bang"	The Platinum Brothers	2:51
3.	"Get Yours" (featuring Mack 10)	Nic & Tone	3:32
4.	"Hungry"	Mr Tony & Narcotic	0:10
5.	"Uh-Huh" (featuring Yukmouth)	Big Resse	3:55
6.	"First Time Actor"	Mr Tony & Narcotic	0:19
7.	"The Hustle"	Nic & Tone	3:23
8.	"Graduation Day"	Mr Tony & Narcotic	0:12
9.	"Hipnotize"	Nic & Tone	3:31
10.	"In My Town"	Young Tre	4:34
11.	"Fire Alarm"	Mr Tony & Narcotic	0:37
12.	"Never Take It Easy"	The Platinum Brothers	3:37
13.	"Keep It Movin"	Daven The Mad Hatter	3:31
14.	"Territory"	Nic & Tone	3:53
15.	"The Shoe Caper"	Mr Tony & Narcotic	0:23
16.	"The Rah Rah Nigguhz" (featuring Sticky Fingaz)	Daven The Mad Hatter	3:56
17.	"Leave Me Alone"	Nic & Tone	3:32
18.	"Black Music Dept"	Mr Tony & Narcotic	0:23
19.	"What You Wish For" (featuring the Outlawz)	The Platinum Brothers	4:40
Total length:			47:57

== Personnel ==
- Aaron "MC Eiht" Tyler – vocals, executive producer
- Dedrick "Mack 10" Rolison – vocals (track 3), associate executive producer
- Jerold "Yukmouth" Ellis Jr. – vocals (track 5)
- Kirk "Sticky Fingaz" Jones – vocals (track 16)
- Outlawz – vocals (track 19)
- Omar Sharif – associate executive producer
- Ed Farris – mixing
- Bobby Bee – mastering
- Humberto "DJ Primer" Cuentas – assistant engineering
- Tyler Roes – assistant engineering
- Brian Porizek – artwork
- Debra Young – photography

== Charts ==
Chart (2002)	Peak position
US Independent Albums (Billboard)	23
US Top R&B/Hip-Hop Albums (Billboard)	54
