= Quo (group) =

American hip hop group

- Wade Robson (Kaos) and DeWayne Turrentine (Syco Smoov)

Background information
- Origin: Brisbane, Australia; Los Angeles, United States
- Genre: Hip hop
- Years active: 1993–1995
- Label: Epic
- Past members: Wade "Kaos" Robson; DeWayne "Syco Smoov" Turrentine

Quo was a short-lived hip hop duo consisting of two child rappers, Australian-born Wade Robson (also known as "Kaos") and American-born DeWayne Turrentine Jr (also known as "Syco Smoove"). The pair were the first rap act signed to Michael Jackson's Epic Records subsidiary, MJJ.

Formed in 1993, Quo released their debut single "Huh What", produced by Redman, early in 1994. On September 20, 1994, they released their second single "Blowin' Up (Don't Stop the Music)", produced by Teddy Riley, which sampled "Don't Stop the Music" by Yarbrough and Peoples and featured guest vocals from Aaron Hall. It peaked at number 25 on the Hot Rap Singles chart and number 90 on the Hot R&B/Hip-Hop Songs chart. Eazy-E cameoed in the music video.

On October 25, 1994, the duo's self-titled album was released. The following year, the duo's third and final single "Quo Funk" was released, produced by Battlecat, which heavily sampled The Jacksons' "This Place Hotel" and charted at #2 on the Bubbling Under R&B/Hip-Hop Singles chart.

After the duo's disbandment following the release of "Quo Funk", Robson became a successful choreographer, producer, and actor, while Turrentine became a successful international supermodel, producer, and actor. He later starred in the 2006 film Waist Deep. He also married actress Reagan Gomez-Preston in 1999, with whom he has two children, a daughter named Scarlett Annette Turrentine (born May 14, 2007) and a son named Tyger Attila Turrentine (born April 2, 2011).

== Discography ==
=== Albums ===
- Quo (1994)

=== Singles ===
- "Huh What" (1994)
- "Blowin' Up (Don't Stop the Music)" (1994)
- "Quo Funk" (1995)
