= Affiliated (album) =

Studio album by MC Eiht
- Released: April 4, 2006
- Recorded: 2006
- Genre: Gangsta rap
- Length: 59:56
- Label: Paid in Full Entertainment
- Producer: DJ Slip; MC Eiht; Tha Chill

MC Eiht chronology
Keep It Gangsta (2006)	Affiliated (2006)	The Best of MC Eiht (2010)

Professional ratings
Review scores
Source	Rating
AllMusic	3.5/5 stars
CD Reviewers	4.5/5 stars
ILLHILL.com	4/5 stars
SeekStores	4.5/5 stars

Affiliated is the eleventh studio album by American rapper MC Eiht, released April 4, 2006 on Paid in Full Entertainment.

== Track listing ==
1. CPT MF'z
2. Which Way Iz Up
3. Say Nuthin' (featuring Tha Chill)
4. What the Fuc U Want Me 2 Do (featuring Tha Chill & Bam)
5. The Ghetto
6. G'sta Melody
7. Just Lean
8. CPT'z Bac
9. Where U Frum (featuring G-Luv of Tha Road Dawgs)
10. Gangsta Minded (featuring Tha Chill & Jaz)
11. Respect It (featuring Compton's Most Wanted)
12. N My Neighborhood
13. Pipe Down (featuring Tha Chill & Boki)
14. Smoke Dis* (featuring Tha Chill & Jayo Felony)
