= The Pioneers (album) =

Studio album by Spice 1 and MC Eiht
- Released: June 29, 2004
- Recorded: 2003–04
- Genre: Hip-hop
- Length: 1:02:07
- Label: Real Talk
- Producer: DJ Epik; Goldfingaz; Mark Knoxx; Warrington

Spice 1 and MC Eiht chronology
The Pioneers (2004)	Keep It Gangsta (2006)

Spice 1 chronology
The Ridah (2004)	The Pioneers (2004)	Dyin' 2 Ball (2005)

MC Eiht chronology
Hood Arrest (2003)	The Pioneers (2004)	Smoke in tha City (2004)

Professional ratings
Review scores
Source	Rating
AllMusic	3/5 stars
RapReviews	6/10

The Pioneers is the debut collaborative studio album by American West Coast hip-hop recording artists Spice 1 and MC Eiht. It was released on June 29, 2004, via Real Talk Entertainment. The album was produced by DJ Epik, Mark Knoxx, Goldfingaz, and Warrington. It debuted at number 71 on the Top R&B/Hip-Hop Albums chart in the United States.

== Track listing ==
No.	Title	Producer(s)	Length
1.	"Break Deez Mu'fuccaz"		0:10
2.	"The Murder Show, Pt. 2"	Mark Knoxx	3:54
3.	"So Damn Crazy"	DJ Epik; Goldfingaz	4:08
4.	"Come on Niggaz"		0:15
5.	"We Run the Block"	DJ Epik; Goldfingaz	4:41
6.	"That's It"	DJ Epik; Mark Knoxx	3:44
7.	"Can't Stop Us"	Goldfingaz; Mark Knoxx	3:44
8.	"That's the Way Life Goes"	DJ Epik; Mark Knoxx	4:35
9.	"East Bay Gangsta"	Warrington	3:24
10.	"All I Came 2 Do"	Mark Knoxx	3:35
11.	"'Bout That Time"	DJ Epik; Mark Knoxx	4:08
12.	"Do Better"	DJ Epik; Goldfingaz	5:03
13.	"Been a Long Time"	Goldfingaz; Mark Knoxx	4:29
14.	"West Coast Party"	Goldfingaz	4:04
15.	"Keepin' Me High"	Mark Knoxx	4:18
16.	"I Ain't Scared"	DJ Epik	3:18
17.	"The Mack"	DJ Epik	4:37
Total length:			1:02:07

== Charts ==
Chart (2004)	Peak position
US Top R&B/Hip-Hop Albums (Billboard)	71
