= Boom Bam =

American rapper (born 1974)

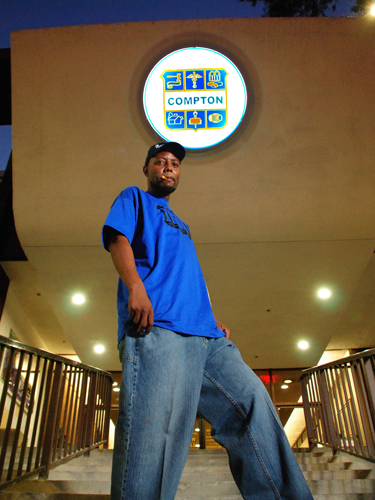
- Boom Bam in 2009

Background information
- Born: Gene Heisser; 1974 (age 51–52); Compton, California, U.S.
- Genres: West Coast hip-hop
- Occupation: Rapper
- Years active: 1993–present
- Member of: Compton's Most Wanted, N.O.T.R.

Gene Heisser (born 1974), known professionally as Boom Bam, is an American rapper who is a member of Compton's Most Wanted and the underground rap group N.O.T.R.

== Biography ==
Heisser was born in Compton, California. He met MC Eiht and Tha Chill while attending Junior High school, and a lifelong friendship developed. In 1987, Eiht and Chill along with DJ's Mike T and Slip created the rap group Compton's Most Wanted and their first album It's A Compton Thang! was released in 1990. The group quickly became famous on the West Coast, and international fame soon followed. After the group dissolved in 1993, Bam, Eiht, and Chill formed N.O.T.R. Atlantic Records bought the album and subsequently shelved the entire project. Underground copies of the album are all that survived. Bam also appeared with MC Eiht on several of his solo projects starting with Death Threatz. When C.M.W. reunited in 2000 for the album Represent, Bam joined the group.

Boom Bam also had a brief movie career with a minor role in the blockbuster hit Menace II Society and in the movie Rhyme & Reason. He also briefly appeared in the backyard scene of Boyz n the Hood.

=== Later years ===
Boom Bam is currently in the studio working with Hard Head Productions on his first solo album titled Still Wanted. It was originally scheduled for release in early 2012, however as of 2021, work still continues on the album. The album will feature a track titled 'No Vasoline #2', a diss track against MC Eiht inspired by 'No Vaseline' by Ice Cube.
