= List of songs recorded by Snoop Dogg =

The following is a list of songs recorded by American rapper Snoop Dogg.

Number of released songs on this list: 417 (as of November 2024)
Song Title	Year	Album	Other performer(s)	Producer(s)
"Absolutely"	2004	The Hard Way	Warren G, Nate Dogg	Quazedelic
"Afro Puffs"	1994	Above the Rim: The Soundtrack	The Lady of Rage	Dr. Dre
"Ain't No Fun (If the Homies Can't Have None)"	1993	Doggystyle	Nate Dogg, Kurupt, Warren G	Dr. Dre
"Ain't Nut'in Personal"	1998	Da Game Is to Be Sold, Not to Be Told	C-Murder, Silkk the Shocker, Crooked Eye	Craig B
"All About Damani"	2007	The Big Squeeze	Damani	Niggaracci
"All Bout U"	1995	All Eyez on Me	2Pac, Dru Down, Hussein Fatal, Yaki Kadafi, Nate Dogg	Johnny "J", 2PAC
"Another Day"	2000	Tha Eastsidaz	Tray Dee, Goldie Loc, Butch Cassidy	Jelly Roll
"Another Summer"	2004	The Hard Way	Warren G, Nate Dogg	Kanye West
"Appreciation"	2004	The Hard Way	Warren G, Nate Dogg	J-Hen
"Ashtrays and Heartbreaks"	2013	Reincarnated	Miley Cyrus	Major Lazer, Ariel Rechtshaid, Dre Skull
"Back Up Off Me"	2000	Tha Last Meal	Master P, Magic	Carlos Stephens
"Ballin'"	2002	Paid tha Cost to Be da Boss	The Dramatics, Lil' Half Dead	Battlecat
"Balls of Steel"	2000	Tha Eastsidaz	Tray Dee, Goldie Loc	Battlecat
"Bang Out"	2004	R&G (Rhythm & Gangsta): The Masterpiece	—	J.R. Rotem
"Batman & Robin"	2002	Paid tha Cost to Be da Boss	The Lady of Rage, RBX	DJ Premier
"Be Thankful"	2000	Tha Eastsidaz	Tray Dee, Goldie Loc, Kam, Pretty Tony, Warren G	Battlecat
"Beat Up On Yo Pads"	2006	Tha Blue Carpet Treatment	—	Mr. Porter, DJ DDT
"Beautiful"	2002	Paid tha Cost to Be da Boss	Pharrell, Charlie Wilson	The Neptunes
"Been Around tha World"	2008	Ego Trippin'	—	Snoop Dogg, Terrace Martin
"Betta Days"	1999	No Limit Top Dogg	—	Meech Wells, Def Jeff
"The Bidness"	2004	R&G (Rhythm & Gangsta): The Masterpiece	—	Soopafly
"Big Bang Theory"	2000	Tha Eastsidaz	Tray Dee, Goldie Loc, Xzibit, Kurupt, CPO, Pinky	Warren G
"Big Pimpin'"	1994	Above the Rim: The Soundtrack	Tha Dogg Pound, Nate Dogg	Dat Nigga Daz
"A Bitch I Knew"	2006	Tha Blue Carpet Treatment	—	Rhythum D, Battlecat
"Bitch Please"	1999	No Limit Top Dogg	Xzibit, Nate Dogg	Dr. Dre
"Bitches Ain't Shit"	1992	The Chronic	Dr. Dre, tha Dogg Pound, Jewell	Dr. Dre
"Blastin'"	2007	Unreleased Heatrocks	MC Eiht	Terrace Martin
"Blueberry"	1996	Tha Doggfather	Tha Dogg Pound, LBC Crew	Sam Sneed
"Boom"	2011	Doggumentary	T-Pain	Scott Storch
"Boss' Life"	2006	Tha Blue Carpet Treatment	Akon	Dr. Dre
"Bo$$ Playa"	2002	Paid tha Cost to Be da Boss	—	Fredwreck
"Da Bo$$ Would Like to See You"	2002	Paid tha Cost to Be da Boss	—	E-Swift
"Boulevard"	2013	Reincarnated	Jahdan Blakkamoore	Major Lazer, Ariel Rechtshaid, Dre Skull
"Brake Fluid"	2000	Tha Last Meal	—	Scott Storch
"Break a Bitch Til I Die"	2001	Duces 'n Trayz: The Old Fashioned Way	—	Jelly Roll
"Bring It On"	2000	Tha Last Meal	Suga Free, Kokane	Jelly Roll
"Buck 'Em"	1999	No Limit Top Dogg	Sticky Fingaz	Dr. Dre
"Buss'n Rocks"	1999	No Limit Top Dogg	—	DJ Quik
"Can I Get a Flicc Witchu"	2004	R&G (Rhythm & Gangsta): The Masterpiece	Bootsy Collins	Josef Laimberg
"Can U Control Yo Hoe"	2004	R&G (Rhythm & Gangsta): The Masterpiece	Soopafly	L.T. Hutton
"Can U Get Away?"	2007	The Big Squeeze	Goldie Loc, Ray J	David Banner
"Can't Say Goodbye"	2008	Ego Trippin'	Charlie Wilson	Teddy Riley
"Candy (Drippin' Like Water)"	2006	Tha Blue Carpet Treatment	E-40, MC Eiht, Goldie Loc, tha Dogg Pound	Rick Rock
"Caught Up"	2009	Death Row: The Lost Sessions Vol. 1	—	Unknown
"Cee Walkin'"	1998	Smokefest Underground	—	Myrion, Big Hutch
"Change Gone Come"	1998	Smokefest Underground	Val Young	L.T. Hutton, Soopafly, Snoop Doggy Dogg
"The Chronic Intro"	1992	The Chronic	Dr. Dre	Dr. Dre
"Cold Game"	2011	Doggumentary	Latoya Williams	Rick Rude
"Connected"	2001	Duces 'n Trayz: The Old Fashioned Way	Tray Dee, Goldie Loc, Mobb Deep, Kokane	The Alchemist
"Conversations"	2006	Tha Blue Carpet Treatment	Stevie Wonder	DJ Pooh, Stevie Wonder
"Cool"	2001	Duces 'n Trayz: The Old Fashioned Way	Tray Dee, Goldie Loc, Nate Dogg, Butch Cassidy	Hi-Tek
"Cool"	2008	Ego Trippin'	—	Teddy Riley
"County Blues"	2000	Dead Man Walkin'	Kevin Vernado	Big Hutch, Daz Dillinger
"Crazy"	2006	Tha Blue Carpet Treatment	Nate Dogg	Fredwreck
"Crip Hop"	2001	Duces 'n Trayz: The Old Fashioned Way	Tray Dee, Goldie Loc, Latoya Williams	Battlecat
"Cyco-Lic-No (Bitch Azz Niggaz)"	1995	Dogg Food	Tha Dogg Pound, Mr. Malik	Dat Nigga Daz
"D.O.G.'s Get Lonely 2"	1998	Da Game Is to Be Sold, Not to Be Told	Jon B	Meech Wells, Snoop Dogg
"The Day the Niggaz Took Over"	1992	The Chronic	Dr. Dre, RBX, Dat Nigga Daz	Dr. Dre
"Deeez Nuuuts"	1992	The Chronic	Dr. Dre, Warren G, Dat Nigga Daz, Nate Dogg	Dr. Dre
"Deep Cover"	1992	Deep Cover: Music from the Original Motion Picture Soundtrack	Dr. Dre	Dr. Dre
"Deez Hollywood Nights"	2008	Ego Trippin'	—	Nottz
"Dev's Song"	2011	Mac & Devin Go to High School: Music from and Inspired by the Movie	Wiz Khalifa	I.D. Labs
"Different Languages"	2009	Malice n Wonderland	Jazmine Sullivan	Teddy Riley, Scoop DeVille, PMG (co.)
"Do It, Do It"	2007	Unreleased Heatrocks	—	Terrace Martin
"Do My Thang"	2013	7 Days of Funk	Dâm-Funk	Dâm-Funk
"Dogg House America"	2002	Doggy Style: Welcome to tha House, Vol. 1	Soopafly, E. White, Mr. Kane, Latoya Williams	Quazedelic
"Dogg Pound Gangsta"	1998	Da Game Is to Be Sold, Not to Be Told	C-Murder, Eddie Griffin	Craig B
"A Dogg'z Day Afternoon"	1995	Dogg Food	Tha Dogg Pound, Nate Dogg	Dat Nigga Daz
"Doggfather"	1996	Tha Doggfather	Charlie Wilson	Dat Nigga Daz
"Doggfather" (Remix)	2001	Death Row's Snoop Doggy Dogg Greatest Hits	—	Timbaland, Lonnie Simmons
"Dogghouse"	2000	Tha Eastsidaz	Tray Dee, Goldie Loc, tha Locs, Rappin' 4-Tay	Goldie Loc
"Dogghouse In Your Mouth"	2001	Duces 'n Trayz: The Old Fashioned Way	Tray Dee, Goldie Loc, Suga Free, Soopafly, RBX, Kurupt, Ruff Dog, King Lou, Mixmaster Spade	Battlecat
"Doggy Dogg World"	1993	Doggystyle	Tha Dogg Pound, the Dramatics	Dr. Dre
"Doggyland"	1996	Tha Doggfather	—	DJ Pooh
"Doggystyle"	2009	Death Row: The Lost Sessions Vol. 1	—	Dr. Dre
"Doggz Gonna Get Ya"	1998	Da Game Is to Be Sold, Not to Be Told	Mac	KLC
"Doh Doh"	2002	Doggy Style: Welcome to tha House, Vol. 1	Soopafly, E. White, Mr. Kane	Hi-Tek
"Doin' Too Much"	1999	No Limit Top Dogg	—	DJ Quik
"Don't Do the Crime"	1998	Smokefest Underground	—	
"Don't Fight the Feelin'"	2002	Doggy Style: Welcome to tha House, Vol. 1	Nate Dogg, Cam'ron, Lady May, Soopafly	Quazedelic, Meech Wells
"Don't Let Go"	1998	Da Game Is to Be Sold, Not to Be Told	—	DJ Darryl
"Don't Make a Wrong Move"	2002	Doggy Style: Welcome to tha House, Vol. 1	Mr. Kane, Special Ed, Prodigy	Nottz
"Don't Stop"	2006	Tha Blue Carpet Treatment	Warzone, Kurupt	THX
"Don't Tell"	1999	No Limit Top Dogg	Warren G, Mausberg, Nate Dogg	DJ Quik
"Down 4 My Niggaz"	1999	No Limit Top Dogg	C-Murder, Magic	KLC
"Downtown Assassins"	1996	Tha Doggfather	Dat Nigga Daz, Tray Dee	Dat Nigga Daz
"Drop It Like It's Hot"	2004	R&G (Rhythm & Gangsta): The Masterpiece	Pharrell	The Neptunes
"Tha Eastsidaz"	2000	Tha Eastsidaz	Tray Dee, Goldie Loc	Meech Wells, Def Jef
"Eastside"	2001	Death Row's Snoop Doggy Dogg Greatest Hits	Tha Eastsidaz, Daz Dillinger	L.T. Hutton
"Eastside Party"	2001	Death Row's Snoop Doggy Dogg Greatest Hits	Nate Dogg	Jimmy Jam and Terry Lewis
"Eastside Ridaz"	2001	Duces 'n Trayz: The Old Fashioned Way	Tray Dee, Goldie Loc, Nate Dogg, Soopafly, Latoya Williams	Hi-Tek
"Eat a Dick"	2009	Death Row: The Lost Sessions Vol. 1	—	Dr. Dre
"El Lay"	2011	Doggumentary	Marty James	Scoop DeVille
"Endo... Light That Shit Up"	2002	Doggy Style: Welcome to tha House, Vol. 1	Soopafly, RBX, Mr. Kane	Hi-Tek
"Everywhere I Go"	2001	Duces 'n Trayz: The Old Fashioned Way	Tray Dee, Goldie Loc, Kokane	Swizz Beatz
"Eyez Closed"	2011	Doggumentary	Kanye West, John Legend	Kanye West, Jeff Bhasker, Mike Dean (add.)
"Faden Away"	2013	7 Days of Funk	Dâm-Funk	Dâm-Funk
"Fallin' Asleep On Death Row"	2009	Death Row: The Lost Sessions Vol. 1	—	Dr. Dre
"For All My Niggaz & Bitches"	1993	Doggystyle	Tha Dogg Pound, the Lady of Rage	Dr. Dre
"Freestyle Conversation"	1996	Tha Doggfather	—	Soopafly
"French Inhale"	2011	Mac & Devin Go to High School: Music from and Inspired by the Movie	Wiz Khalifa, Mike Posner	Jake One
"Fresh Pair of Panties On"	2004	R&G (Rhythm & Gangsta): The Masterpiece	—	Ole Folks
"Friends"	2001	Duces 'n Trayz: The Old Fashioned Way	Tray Dee, Goldie Loc, Kokane	The Alchemist
"From Long Beach 2 Brick City"	2002	Paid tha Cost to Be da Boss	Redman, Nate Dogg	Fredwreck
"From tha Chuuuch to da Palace"	2002	Paid tha Cost to Be da Boss	Pharrell	The Neptunes
"Fruit Juice"	2013	Reincarnated	Mr. Vegas	Major Lazer, Ariel Rechtshaid
"Fuck wit Dre Day (And Everybody's Celebratin')"	1992	The Chronic	Dr. Dre, RBX, Jewell	Dr. Dre
"Fuckin' Is Good for You"	2007	The Big Squeeze	Damani, JT the Bigga Figga, Kurupt, Soopafly	Niggaracci
"G Bedtime Stories"	1999	No Limit Top Dogg	—	Meech Wells
"G Funk Intro"	1993	Doggystyle	Dr. Dre, the Lady of Rage	Dr. Dre
"Tha G In Deee"	2000	Tha Eastsidaz	Tray Dee, Goldie Loc	Keith Clizark, Meech Wells
"G'd Up"	2000	Tha Eastsidaz	Tray Dee, Goldie Loc, Butch Cassidy	Battlecat
"Game of Life"	1998	Da Game Is to Be Sold, Not to Be Told	Steady Mobb'n	Carlos Stephens
"Gang Bang 4 Real"	2001	Duces 'n Trayz: The Old Fashioned Way	Tray Dee, Goldie Loc, Bad Azz	Fredwreck
"Gangbang Rookie"	2011	Doggumentary	Pilot	Jake One
"Gangbangin' 101"	2006	Tha Blue Carpet Treatment	The Game	Terrace Martin
"Gangstas Don't Live That Long"	2014	That's My Work Vol. 3		Mr. Porter
"Gangsta Like Me"	2008	Ego Trippin'	Jamie Foxx	Teddy Riley
"Gangsta Luv"	2009	Malice n Wonderland	The-Dream	Tricky Stewart, The-Dream
"Gangsta Luv" (Mayer Hawthorne G-Mix)	2010	More Malice	—	Mayer Hawthorne
"Gangsta Ride"	1999	No Limit Top Dogg	Silkk the Shocker	Meech Wells
"Gangsta Walk"	2000	Dead Man Walkin'	Tha Dogg Pound	Daz Dillinger
"Gangstas Due"	2007	Unreleased Heatrocks	J. Black	Terrace Martin
"The Genie"	2009	Death Row: The Lost Sessions Vol. 1	Bad Azz	L.T. Hutton
"Get a Light"	2006	Tha Blue Carpet Treatment	Damian Marley	Timbaland, Danja
"Get Away"	2013	Reincarnated	Angela Hunte	Major Lazer, Ariel Rechtshaid
"Get Bout It & Rowdy"	1998	Da Game Is to Be Sold, Not to Be Told	Master P	KLC
"Get Closer"	2007	The Big Squeeze	Azuré	Niggaracci
"Ghetto"	2000	Tha Eastsidaz	Tray Dee, Goldie Loc, Kokane, Kam, Nate Dogg	Battlecat
"Ghetto Symphony"	1999	No Limit Top Dogg	Mia X, Fiend, C-Murder, Silkk the Shocker, Mystikal, Goldie Loc	KLC
"Gin and Juice"	1993	Doggystyle	—	Dr. Dre
"Gin & Juice II"	1998	Da Game Is to Be Sold, Not to Be Told	—	Carlos Stephens
"Girl Like U"	2004	R&G (Rhythm & Gangsta): The Masterpiece	Nelly	L.T. Hutton
"Give It 2 'em Dogg"	2000	Tha Eastsidaz	Tray Dee, Goldie Loc, Bugsy Siegel	Goldie Loc, Bugsy Siegel
"Go Away"	2000	Tha Last Meal	Kokane	Ketih Clizark, Meech Wells
"Gold Rush"	1996	Tha Doggfather	Kurupt, LBC Crew	Arkim & Flair
"Gold Rush" (Lite Mix)	1998	Smokefest Underground	—	
"The Good Good"	2013	Reincarnated	Iza	Terrace Martin, Kyle Townsend
"Got Beef"	2000	Tha Eastsidaz	Tray Dee, Goldie Loc, Jayo Felony, Sylk-E. Fyne	L.T. Hutton
"Got to Do Wrong"	2009	Death Row: The Lost Sessions Vol. 1	—	
"Gotta Find a Way"	2004	The Hard Way	Warren G, Nate Dogg	Lil' Half Dead, Terrace Martin
"Gravy Train"	2009	Death Row: The Lost Sessions Vol. 1	Bad Azz, Tray-Dee	Unknown
"Groupie"	1996	Tha Doggfather	Tha Dogg Pound, Nate Dogg, Warren G, Charlie Wilson	Dat Nigga Daz
"Groupie Luv"	2004	The Hard Way	Warren G, Nate Dogg	DJ Pooh
"Gz and Hustlas"	1993	Doggystyle	—	Dr. Dre
"Gz Up, Hoes Down"	1993	Doggystyle	—	Dr. Dre
"Harder Times"	2013	Reincarnated	Jahdan Blakkamore	Dre Skull, Major Lazer
"Head Doctor"	2000	Dead Man Walkin'	Swoop G, Raphael Saadiq	Kurt "Kobane" Couthon
"Hell Yeah"	2005	The Best of Snoop Dogg	WC	Bink
"Hennesey n Buddah"	2000	Tha Last Meal	Kokane	Dr. Dre
"Here Comes the King"	2013	Reincarnated	Angela Hunte	Major Lazer, Ariel Rechtshaid, 6Blocc
"Hey You!"	2002	Doggy Style: Welcome to tha House, Vol. 1	Soopafly, E. White	The Alchemist
"High School"	2011	Mac & Devin Go to High School: Music from and Inspired by the Movie	Wiz Khalifa	Larrance Dopson
"High Wit Me"	2013	7 Days of Funk	Dâm-Funk	Dâm-Funk
"Hit da Pavement"	2013	7 Days of Funk	Dâm-Funk	Dâm-Funk
"Hit Roccs"	1998, 2000	Smokefest Underground	—	DJ Pooh, Snoop Doggy Dogg
"Hoes, Money & Clout"	1998	Da Game Is to Be Sold, Not to Be Told	—	Soopafly
"Hoez"	1998	Smokefest Underground	Luther Campbell, tha Dogg Pound	
"Hoez"	2009	Death Row: The Lost Sessions Vol. 1	Tha Dogg Pound	Daz Dillinger
"Hourglass"	2002	Paid tha Cost to Be da Boss	Kokane, Goldie Loc	Jelly Roll
"House Shoes"	2010	More Malice	—	Drumma Boy
"How You Livin'"	2000	Tha Eastsidaz	Tray Dee, Goldie Loc, Butch Cassidy	Battlecat
"Hustle & Ball"	1998	Da Game Is to Be Sold, Not to Be Told	—	O'Dell
"I Believe In You"	2002	Paid tha Cost to Be da Boss	Latoya Williams	Hi-Tek
"I Can't Swim"	2000	Tha Last Meal	—	Jelly Roll
"I Don't Know"	2001	Duces 'n Trayz: The Old Fashioned Way	Tray Dee, Goldie Loc, Suga Free, Soopafly, Latoya Williams	Battlecat
"I Don't Need No Bitch"	2011	Doggumentary	Devin the Dude, Kobe	DJ Khalil
"I Fuck with You"	2007	Unreleased Heatrocks	Richie Rich	Terrace Martin
"I Get Lifted"	2011	Mac & Devin Go to High School: Music from and Inspired by the Movie	Wiz Khalifa	Warren G
"I Got My Own"	2007	Unreleased Heatrocks	Swizz Beatz	Terrace Martin
"I Love My Momma"	1999	No Limit Top Dogg	—	Meech Wells
"I Love to Give You Light"	2004	R&G (Rhythm & Gangsta): The Masterpiece	—	The Alchemist
"I Luv It"	2001	Duces 'n Trayz: The Old Fashioned Way	Tray Dee, Goldie Loc	Battlecat
"I Miss That Bitch"	2002	Paid tha Cost to Be da Boss	E-White	Hi-Tek
"I Pledge Allegiance"	2001	Duces 'n Trayz: The Old Fashioned Way	Tray Dee, Goldie Loc, Soopafly, Kokane	Fredwreck
"I Wanna Fuck You"	2006	Tha Blue Carpet Treatment	Akon	Akon
"I Wanna Rock"	2009	Malice n Wonderland	—	Scoop DeVille
"I Wanna Rock" (The Kings G-Mix)	2010	More Malice	Jay-Z	Scoop DeVille
"I Wanna Rock" (Travis Barker G-Mix)	2010	More Malice	—	Travis Barker
"I Will Survive"	1998	Smokefest Underground	Techniec, Soopafly	Soopafly
"I'll Be There 4U"	2013	7 Days of Funk	Dâm-Funk	Dâm-Funk
"I'm Threw Witchu"	2004	R&G (Rhythm & Gangsta): The Masterpiece	Soopafly	Warryn Campbell
"If"	2005	Welcome to tha Chuuch: Da Album	Wendi & YN, J. Black	Terrace Martin
"If We All Fucc"	1995	Dogg Food	Tha Dogg Pound	Dat Nigga Daz
"Imagine"	2006	Tha Blue Carpet Treatment	Dr. Dre, D'Angelo	Dr. Dre, Mark Batson
"In Love with a Thug"	1999	No Limit Top Dogg	—	Meech Wells
"Intrology"	2006	Tha Blue Carpet Treatment	George Clinton	Battlecat
"Issues"	2000	Tha Last Meal	—	Meech Wells
"It Could Be Easy"	2011	Mac & Devin Go to High School: Music from and Inspired by the Movie	Wiz Khalifa	Larrance Dopson
"It's D Only Thang"	2011	Doggumentary	—	David Banner, THX (co.), Crane (co.)
"Joysticc"	2004	The Hard Way	Warren G, Nate Dogg	Terrace Martin, Marlon Williams
"Just Dippin'"	1999	No Limit Top Dogg	Dr. Dre, Jewell	Dr. Dre
"Just Get Carried Away"	2002	Doggy Style: Welcome to tha House, Vol. 1	Reo Varnado, Vinnie Bernard	DJ Scratch
"Just the Way You Like It"	2005	Welcome to tha Chuuch: Da Album	Nine Inch Dix	Soopafly
"Just Watching"	1996	Tha Doggfather	2Pac, Tha Dogg Pound, Charlie Wilson	Daz Dillinger
"Keep It Gangsta"	2004	The Hard Way	Warren G, Nate Dogg	Battlecat
"Keep It Real"	2001	Death Row's Snoop Doggy Dogg Greatest Hits	Bad Azz, Kurupt, Mack 10, Techniec, Threat	Soopafly
"Keep It Real Dogg"	2009	Death Row: The Lost Sessions Vol. 1	—	Soopafly
"La La La"	2013	Reincarnated	—	Major Lazer, Ariel Rechtshaid
"Last Meal"	1998	Smokefest Underground	—	
"Late Night"	2001	Duces 'n Trayz: The Old Fashioned Way	Tray Dee, Goldie Loc, Kokane	Meech Wells
"LAX"	2006	Tha Blue Carpet Treatment	Ice Cube	Battlecat
"Lay Low"	2000	Tha Last Meal	Nate Dogg, Butch Cassidy, tha Eastsidaz, Master P	Dr. Dre, Mike Elizondo
"LBC Thang"	2000	Tha Eastsidaz	Tray Dee, Goldie Loc, Butch Cassidy	Battlecat
"Leave Me Alone"	2000	Tha Last Meal	—	Battlecat
"Let It Go"	2013	7 Days of Funk	Dâm-Funk	Dâm-Funk
"Let It Out"	2008	Ego Trippin'	—	Teddy Riley, Ron Fair
"Let Me Ride"	1992	The Chronic	Dr. Dre, Ruben, Jewell	Dr. Dre
"Let's Get Blown"	2004	R&G (Rhythm & Gangsta): The Masterpiece	Pharrell	The Neptunes
"Let's Get This Party Started"	2007	The Big Squeeze	Azuré	Niggaracci
"Let's Go Study"	2011	Mac & Devin Go to High School: Music from and Inspired by the Movie	Wiz Khalifa	Jake One, Soopafly (co.)
"Life Goes On"	2000	Tha Eastsidaz	Tray Dee, Goldie Loc	Meech Wells
"Life of da Party"	2008	Ego Trippin'	Too Short, Mistah F.A.B.	Scoop DeVille
"Life's Hard"	2009	Death Row: The Lost Sessions Vol. 1	K-Ci & JoJo, Big Pimpin'	Unknown
"Lighters Up"	2013	Reincarnated	Mavado, Popcaan	Dre Skull, Major Lazer
"Like Rock Stars"	2007	The Big Squeeze	Bad Lucc, Damani, JT the Bigga Figga, Uncle Chucc	Niggaracci
"Like This"	2006	Tha Blue Carpet Treatment	Western Union, Latoya Williams	Soopafly
"Lil' Ghetto Boy"	1992	The Chronic	Dr. Dre, Dat Nigga Daz	Dr. Dre
"Lil Girl"	2004	The Hard Way	Warren G, Nate Dogg	Michael Angelo
"Lodi Dodi"	1993	Doggystyle	—	Dr. Dre
"Lollipop"	2002	Paid tha Cost to Be da Boss	Jay-Z, Soopafly, Nate Dogg	Just Blaze
"Lonely Girl"	2004	The Hard Way	Warren G, Nate Dogg	Nottz
"Long Gone"	2007	Unreleased Heatrocks	Mr. Porter	Terrace Martin
"Look Around"	2007	Unreleased Heatrocks	J. Black	Terrace Martin
"Look Out"	2008	Christmas In tha Dogghouse	Kurupt, Daz Dillinger, Nate Dogg	
"Looking for a Bad Bitch"	2007	Unreleased Heatrocks	Flavor Flav	Terrace Martin
"Loosen' Control"	2000	Tha Last Meal	Soopafly, Butch Cassidy	Soopafly
"Love Don't Live Here"	2007	Unreleased Heatrocks	—	Terrace Martin
"Luv Drunk"	2009	Malice n Wonderland	The-Dream	Tricky Stewart, The-Dream
"Mary Jane"	2004	The Hard Way	Warren G, Nate Dogg	Quazedelic
"May I"	2000	Dead Man Walkin'	Lil Malik	Soopafly
"Me and My Doggs"	2000	Dead Man Walkin'	Techniec	L.T. Hutton, Snoop Doggy Dogg
"Midnight Love"	2001	Death Row's Snoop Doggy Dogg Greatest Hits	Daz Dillinger, Raphael Saadiq	Soopafly, Snoop Doggy Dogg
"Mission Cleopatra"	2002	Paid tha Cost to Be da Boss	Jamel Debbouze	Daz Dillinger
"MLK"	2004	The Hard Way	Warren G, Nate Dogg	Battlecat
"Murder Was the Case"	1993	Doggystyle	—	Dr. Dre
"Murder Was the Case" (Remix)	1994	Murder Was the Case: The Soundtrack	—	Dr. Dre
"My Dirty Ho"	2004	The Hard Way	Warren G, Nate Dogg	J-Hen
"My Favorite Color"	2000	Dead Man Walkin'	Big Hutch	Myrion, Big Hutch
"My Fucn House"	2011	Doggumentary	Young Jeezy, E-40	Rick Rock
"My Heat Goes Boom"	1999	No Limit Top Dogg	—	Meech Wells
"My Medicine"	2008	Ego Trippin'	Everlast	Everlast
"My Own"	2011	Doggumentary	Mr. Porter	Mr. Porter
"Neva Have 2 Worry"	2008	Ego Trippin'	Uncle Chucc	Snoop Dogg, Terrace Martin
"New York"	2007	Unreleased Heatrocks	—	Terrace Martin
"New York, New York"	1995	Dogg Food	Tha Dogg Pound	DJ Pooh
"Nigga 4 Life"	2000	Tha Eastsidaz	Tray Dee, Goldie Loc, Bad Azz	Blaqthoven
"Nite L.O.C.s"	2002	Doggy Style: Welcome to tha House, Vol. 1	Mr. Kane	Quazedelic, Meech Wells
"No Guns Allowed"	2013	Reincarnated	Drake, Cori B	Major Lazer, Ariel Rechtshaid, Dre Skull, Zach Condon
"No Thang On Me"	2004	R&G (Rhythm & Gangsta): The Masterpiece	Bootsy Collins	Hi-Tek
"Not Like It Was"	2002	Doggy Style: Welcome to tha House, Vol. 1	Soopafly, E. White, RBX	Ez Elpee
"Now Is the Time"	2001	Duces 'n Trayz: The Old Fashioned Way	Tray Dee, Goldie Loc, Kokane	Keith Clizark, Meech Wells
"Now We Lay 'em Down"	2000	Tha Eastsidaz	Tray Dee, Goldie Loc	Meech Wells
"Nuthin' but a 'G' Thang"	1992	The Chronic	Dr. Dre	Dr. Dre
"O.G."	2009	Death Row: The Lost Sessions Vol. 1	Nate Dogg	Daz Dillinger
"(O.J.) Wake Up"	1996	Tha Doggfather	Tray Dee	Snoop Doggy Dogg, LT Hutton
"OG"	2011	Mac & Devin Go to High School: Music from and Inspired by the Movie	Wiz Khalifa, Currensy	I.D. Labs
"Oh No"	2004	R&G (Rhythm & Gangsta): The Masterpiece	50 Cent	Ron Browz, Sha Money XL
"Once Again"	2009	Death Row: The Lost Sessions Vol. 1	—	
"The One and Only"	2002	Paid tha Cost to Be da Boss	—	DJ Premier
"One Chance (Make It Good)"	2008	Ego Trippin'	—	Frequency
"One Life to Live"	2009	Death Row: The Lost Sessions Vol. 1	The Lady of Rage, Techniec	Snoop Doggy Dogg, Soopafly, Daz Dillinger
"Paper'd Up"	2002	Paid tha Cost to Be da Boss	Kokane, Traci Nelson	Fredwreck
"Party with a D.P.G."	1999	No Limit Top Dogg	—	Jelly Roll
"Pass It Pass It"	2004	R&G (Rhythm & Gangsta): The Masterpiece	—	The Neptunes
"Peer Pressure"	2011	Doggumentary	Traci Nelson	Fredwreck
"Perfect"	2004	R&G (Rhythm & Gangsta): The Masterpiece	Charlie Wilson	The Neptunes
"Picture This"	1998	Da Game Is to Be Sold, Not to Be Told	Mia X	Craig B
"Pimp Slapp'd"	2002	Paid tha Cost to Be da Boss	—	Josef Laimberg
"A Pimp's Christmas Song"	2008	Christmas In tha Dogghouse	Bishop Magic Juan, Jake the Flake	
"Pimpin' Ain't EZ"	2009	Malice n Wonderland	R. Kelly	Nottz
"Platinum"	2011	Doggumentary	R. Kelly	Lex Luger
"Pop Pop Bang!"	2007	The Big Squeeze	Kurupt, Kam	Niggaracci
"Pray for Pussy"	1998	Da Game Is to Be Sold, Not to Be Told	Big Pimpin'	Snoop Dogg
"Press Play"	2008	Ego Trippin'	Kurupt	DJ Quik
"Promise I"	2004	R&G (Rhythm & Gangsta): The Masterpiece	—	Mr. Porter
"Pronto"	2009	Malice n Wonderland	Soulja Boy	B-Don, Super Ced (co.)
"Pronto" (G-Mix)	2010	More Malice	Soulja Boy, Bun B	B-Don, Super Ced (co.)
"Protocol"	2010	More Malice	—	Nottz
"Psst!"	2006	Tha Blue Carpet Treatment	Jamie Foxx	N8, Brainz, Jamie Foxx
"Pump Pump"	1993	Doggystyle	Lil Malik	Dr. Dre
"Pussy Sells"	2000	Tha Eastsidaz	Tray Dee, Goldie Loc, Suga Free	L.T. Hutton
"Put It In Ya Mouth"	2009	Death Row: The Lost Sessions Vol. 1	—	Unknown
"Quite Obvious"	2009	Death Row: The Lost Sessions Vol. 1	—	
"Raised In da Hood"	2011	Doggumentary	—	Warryn Campbell, DJ Reflex (co.)
"Raised On tha Side"	2002	Doggy Style: Welcome to tha House, Vol. 1	Soopafly, E. White, Mr. Kane, Daz Dillinger	Fredwreck
"Rat-Tat-Tat-Tat"	1992	The Chronic	Dr. Dre, RBX, BJ	Dr. Dre
"Ready 2 Ryde"	2000	Tha Last Meal	Eve	Scott Storch
"Real Soon"	2005	Welcome to tha Chuuch: Da Album	Tha Dogg Pound, Nate Dogg	Battlecat
"Rebel Way"	2013	Reincarnated	—	Dre Skull, Major Lazer
"Remedy"	2013	Reincarnated	Busta Rhymes, Chris Brown	Major Lazer, Ariel Rechtshaid
"Ride"	2013	7 Days of Funk	Dâm-Funk, Kurupt	Dâm-Funk
"Ride On" (Remix)	1998	Smokefest Underground	Kurupt	
"Riders on the Storm" (Remix)	2004	Soundtrack for the 2004 video-game Need for Speed: Underground 2	The Doors	Fredwreck
"Ridin' In My Chevy"	2008	Ego Trippin'	—	Scoop DeVille
"The Roach"	1992	The Chronic	Dr. Dre, RBX, Emmage, Ruben, Dat Nigga Daz, the Lady of Rage, Jewell	Dr. Dre
"Round Here"	2006	Tha Blue Carpet Treatment	—	Dr. Dre
"Run On Up"	2004	The Hard Way	Warren G, Nate Dogg	Tha Chill
"SD Is Out"	2008	Ego Trippin'	Charlie Wilson	Teddy Riley
"Secrets"	2009	Malice n Wonderland	Kokane	Battlecat
"See Ya When I Get There"	1998	Da Game Is to Be Sold, Not to Be Told	C-Murder, Mystikal	Keith Clizark, Meech Wells
"Serial Killa"	1993	Doggystyle	The D.O.C., RBX, tha Dogg Pound	Dr. Dre
"Set It Off"	2000	Tha Last Meal	MC Ren, the Lady of Rage, Ice Cube, Nate Dogg, Kurupt	Timbaland
"Sets Up"	2008	Ego Trippin'	Pharrell	The Neptunes
"Sexual Eruption"	2008	Ego Trippin'	—	Shawty Redd
"Shake That Shit"	2005	Welcome to tha Chuuch: Da Album	Tiffany Foxx, Young Walt	Terrace Martin
"Tha Shiznit"	1993	Doggystyle	—	Dr. Dre
"Show Me Love"	1998	Da Game Is to Be Sold, Not to Be Told	Charlie Wilson	DJ Pooh
"Signs"	2004	R&G (Rhythm & Gangsta): The Masterpiece	Justin Timberlake, Charlie Wilson	The Neptunes
"Side Piece"	2016	Coolaid	not applicable	Swizz Beatz, Musicman Ty, Avenue Beatz
"Sisters N Brothers"	2005	Welcome to tha Chuuch: Da Album	J. Black, Mira Craig	Jellyroll
"Sixx Minutes"	1996	Tha Doggfather	—	Arkim & Flair
"Slow Down"	1998	Da Game Is to Be Sold, Not to Be Told	Mia X, O'Dell, Anita Thomas	O'Dell
"Smoke the Weed"	2013	Reincarnated	Collie Buddz	Supa Dups, Major Lazer, Jus Bus
"Smokin' All My Bud"	2005	Welcome to tha Chuuch: Da Album	Nine Inch Dix, Uncle Reo, Shon Lawon	Shon Lawon
"Smokin' On"	2011	Mac & Devin Go to High School: Music from and Inspired by the Movie	Wiz Khalifa, Juicy J	Drumma Boy
"Smooth"	1995	Dogg Food	Tha Dogg Pound, Val Young	DJ Pooh
"Snoop Bounce"	1996	Tha Doggfather	Charlie Wilson	DJ Pooh
"Snoop Bounce" (Roc N Roll Remix)	2001	Death Row's Snoop Doggy Dogg Greatest Hits	Charlie Wilson, Rage Against the Machine	Terry Date
"Snoop D.O. Double G"	2004	R&G (Rhythm & Gangsta): The Masterpiece	—	Black Jeruz, Sha Money XL
"Snoop Dogg (What's My Name Pt. 2)"	2000	Tha Last Meal	—	Timbaland
"Snoop World"	1998	Da Game Is to Be Sold, Not to Be Told	Master P	KLC
"Snoop's Upside Ya Head"	1996	Tha Doggfather	Charlie Wilson	DJ Pooh
"Snoopafella"	1999	No Limit Top Dogg	—	Ant Banks
"So Fly"	2004	The Hard Way	Warren G, Nate Dogg	Spike & Jamahl, Missy Elliott
"So Gangsta"	2010	More Malice	Butch Cassidy	Dae One
"So Long"	2013	Reincarnated	Angela Hunte	Major Lazer, Zion I Kings
"So Low"	2001	Duces 'n Trayz: The Old Fashioned Way	Tray Dee, Goldie Loc, Lil' Mo	Quazedelic, Meech Wells
"Some Bomb Azz Pussy"	1995	Dogg Food	Tha Dogg Pound	Dat Nigga Daz
"Somethin' 'Bout Yo' Bidness"	1999	No Limit Top Dogg	Raphael Saadiq	G-One
"Special"	2009	Malice n Wonderland	Brandy, Pharrell	The Neptunes
"Spend Some Time"	2007	The Big Squeeze	Ricky Harris, Uncle Chucc, Kurupt, Soopafly	Niggaracci
"Squeeze Play"	2002	Doggy Style: Welcome to tha House, Vol. 1	IV Life Family	DJ Slip
"Stacey Adams"	2000	Tha Last Meal	—	Battlecat
"Staxxx In My Jeans"	2008	Ego Trippin'	—	Rick Rock
"Step Yo Game Up"	2004	R&G (Rhythm & Gangsta): The Masterpiece	Lil Jon, Trina	Lil Jon
"Sticky Fingers"	2001	Duces 'n Trayz: The Old Fashioned Way	Tray Dee, Goldie Loc, Kokane, Rick Rock	Rick Rock
"Still a G Thang"	1998	Da Game Is to Be Sold, Not to Be Told	—	Meech Wells, Master P
"Stoplight"	2002	Paid tha Cost to Be da Boss	—	Jelly Roll
"Stranded On Death Row"	1992	The Chronic	Dr. Dre, Bushwick Bill, Kurupt, RBX, the Lady of Rage	Dr. Dre
"The Strong Will Eat the Weak"	2002	Doggy Style: Welcome to tha House, Vol. 1	RBX, Mr. Kane	Ervin EP Pope
"Suited N Booted"	2002	Paid tha Cost to Be da Boss	—	Meech Wells, Keith Clizark
"Sumthin' Like This Night"	2011	Doggumentary	Gorillaz, Yukimi Nagano, Tony Allen	Damon Albarn, Gorillaz (co.), Jason Cox (co.)
"Superman"	2011	Doggumentary	Willie Nelson	Willie Nelson
"Sweat"	2011	Doggumentary	David Guetta	The Cataracs
"Systamatic"	2013	7 Days of Funk	Dâm-Funk, tha Dogg Pound	Dâm-Funk
"T'was the Night Before Xmas"	2008	Christmas In tha Dogghouse	Damani, Nate Dogg	
"Take It Back to '85"	2000	Tha Eastsidaz	Tray Dee, Goldie Loc, Kurupt, Butch Cassidy	Soopafly
"Take U Home"	2011	Doggumentary	Too Short, Kokane, Daz Dillinger	Meech Wells, Soul Mechanix (co.)
"Talent Show"	2011	Mac & Devin Go to High School: Music from and Inspired by the Movie	Wiz Khalifa	Jesse "Corparal" Wilson
"(Tear 'em Off) Me and My Doggz"	1996	Tha Doggfather	—	L.T. Hutton
"Territory"	2007	Unreleased Heatrocks	Brotha Lynch Hung	Terrace Martin
"That Good"	2011	Mac & Devin Go to High School: Music from and Inspired by the Movie	Wiz Khalifa	Cardo
"That Tree"	2010	More Malice	Kid Cudi	Diplo, Paul Devro (add.)
"That's tha Homie"	2009	Malice n Wonderland	—	Danja
"That's That Shit"	2006	Tha Blue Carpet Treatment	R. Kelly	Nottz
"The Next Episode"	1999	2001	Dr. Dre	Dr. Dre
"There Comes a Time"	2001	Duces 'n Trayz: The Old Fashioned Way	Tray Dee, Goldie Loc, Daddy V	Jelly Roll
"Think About It"	2006	Tha Blue Carpet Treatment	—	Frequency
"This Weed Iz Mine"	2011	Doggumentary	Wiz Khalifa	Scoop DeVille
"Those Gurlz"	2008	Ego Trippin'	—	Teddy Riley, DJ Quik
"Tired of Running"	2013	Reincarnated	Akon	Akon, Leslie Brathwaite
"Tommy Boy"	1998	Smokefest Underground	Daz Dillinger	Daz Dillinger
"Too Blacc"	1998	Smokefest Underground	—	L.T. Hutton, Snoop Doggy Dogg
"Too High (Poly High)"	2001	Death Row's Snoop Doggy Dogg Greatest Hits	Daz Dillinger, the Twinz, Big Pimpin'	L.T. Hutton
"Torn Apart"	2013	Reincarnated	Rita Ora	Major Lazer, Ariel Rechtshaid, John Hill
"Toyz N da Hood"	2011	Doggumentary	Bootsy Collins	Jake One
"Tru Tank Doggs"	1998	Da Game Is to Be Sold, Not to Be Told	Mystikal	KLC
"True Lies"	2000	Tha Last Meal	Kokane	Dr. Dre, Mike Elizondo
"Trust Me"	1999	No Limit Top Dogg	Suga Free, Sylk-E. Fyne	Bud'da
"Twist Yo Body"	2004	The Hard Way	Warren G, Nate Dogg	Hi-Tek
"Up Jump tha Boogie"	1996	Tha Doggfather	Charlie Wilson, Teena Marie	DJ Pooh
"Ups & Downs"	2004	R&G (Rhythm & Gangsta): The Masterpiece	Bee Gees	Warryn Campbell
"Ups & Downs"	2004	The Hard Way	Warren G, Nate Dogg	Battlecat, tha Chill
"Upside Down"	2009	Malice n Wonderland	Nipsey Hussle, Problem	Terrace Martin, Jason Martin (co.)
"Usual Suspects"	2001	Death Row's Snoop Doggy Dogg Greatest Hits	Threat	L.T. Hutton
"Vapors"	1996	Tha Doggfather	—	DJ Pooh
"Vato"	2006	Tha Blue Carpet Treatment	B-Real	The Neptunes
"Wanna B'z"	2007	Unreleased Heatrocks	Young Jeezy, Nate Dogg	Terrace Martin
"Wasn't Your Fault"	2002	Paid tha Cost to Be da Boss	Ginuwine	L.T. Hutton
"Waste of Time"	2008	Ego Trippin'	Raphael Saadiq	Raphael Saadiq, Bobby Ozuna
"The Way Life Used to Be"	2011	Doggumentary	—	Battlecat
"We Came to Bang Out"	2007	The Big Squeeze	Tha Dogg Pound, Soopafly	Soopafly
"We Rest N Cali"	2011	Doggumentary	Goldie Loc, Bootsy Collins	Mr. Porter
"We West Coast"	2005	Welcome to tha Chuuch: Da Album	Tha Dogg Pound	Josef Laimsberg
"Welcome 2 tha House"	2001	Duces 'n Trayz: The Old Fashioned Way	Tray Dee, Goldie Loc, tha Angels, Nate Dogg	Battlecat
"West Allstars"	2007	Unreleased Heatrocks	War Zone, JT the Bigga Figga, JoJo	Terrace Martin
"Westside"	2007	Unreleased Heatrocks	J. Black	Terrace Martin
"Wet"	2011	Doggumentary	—	The Cataracs
"Wet" (David Guetta Remix)	2011	Doggumentary	—	David Guetta, the Cataracs
"Who Am I (What's My Name)?"	1993	Doggystyle	—	Dr. Dre
"Whatcha Gon Do?"	1998	Da Game Is to Be Sold, Not to Be Told	Master P	Master P
"Whateva U Do"	2008	Ego Trippin'	—	Khao
"Which One of You"	2006	Tha Blue Carpet Treatment	Nine Inch Dix	1500 or Nothin'
"Whistle While You Hustle"	2004	The Hard Way	Warren G, Nate Dogg, Daz Dillinger, Soopafly	Jelly Roll
"Who Got Some Gangsta Shit?"	1994	Murder Was the Case: The Soundtrack	Tha Dogg Pound, Lil Style, Young Swoop	Soopafly
"Why Did You Leave Me"	2008	Ego Trippin'	Chili Chil	Polow da Don, Hit-Boy
"Wingz"	2013	7 Days of Funk	Dâm-Funk	Dâm-Funk
"Wonder What It Do"	2011	Doggumentary	Uncle Chucc	Battlecat
"Woof!"	1998	Da Game Is to Be Sold, Not to Be Told	Fiend, Mystikal	Craig B, Master P
"A Word Witchya!"	2008	Ego Trippin'	—	Scoop DeVille
"World Class"	2011	Mac & Devin Go to High School: Music from and Inspired by the Movie	Wiz Khalifa	Cardo
"Wrong Idea"	2000	Tha Last Meal	Bad Azz, Kokane, Lil Half Dead	Jelly Roll
"Y'all Gone Miss Me"	2000	Tha Last Meal	Kokane	Scott Storch
"You Can Put It In a Zag, I'mma Put It In a Blunt"	2011	Mac & Devin Go to High School: Music from and Inspired by the Movie	Wiz Khalifa	Exile
"You Got What I Want"	2002	Paid tha Cost to Be da Boss	Goldie Loc, Ludacris, Charlie Wilson	Jelly Roll
"You Thought"	1996	Tha Doggfather	Soopafly, Too Short	Soopafly
"You're Gonna Luv Me"	2010	More Malice	Mac Lucci	Sakke
"Young, Wild & Free"	2011	Mac & Devin Go to High School: Music from and Inspired by the Movie	Wiz Khalifa	The Smeezingtons
"1Question?"	2013	7 Days of Funk	Dâm-Funk, Steve Arrington	Dâm-Funk
"2 Minute Warning"	2009	Malice n Wonderland	—	Terrace Martin
"2 of Amerikaz Most Wanted"	1996	All Eyez on Me	2Pac	Dat Nigga Daz
"6:30"	2011	Mac & Devin Go to High School: Music from and Inspired by the Movie	Wiz Khalifa	Nottz
"10 Lil Crips"	2006	Tha Blue Carpet Treatment	—	The Neptunes
"20 Dollars to My Name"	1998	Da Game Is to Be Sold, Not to Be Told	Fiend, Master P, Silkk the Shocker, Soulja Slim	Master P
"20 Minutes"	1999	No Limit Top Dogg	Goldie Loc	Goldie Loc
"31 Flavaz"	2007	The Big Squeeze	Kurupt	Niggaracci
"213 tha Gangsta Clicc"	2004	The Hard Way	Warren G, Nate Dogg	Josef Laimberg and big boy baller.
"1800"	2009	Malice n Wonderland	Lil Jon	Lil Jon
"2001"	1996	Tha Doggfather	Bad Azz, Kurupt, Threat	DJ Pooh
