= Snoop Dogg albums discography =

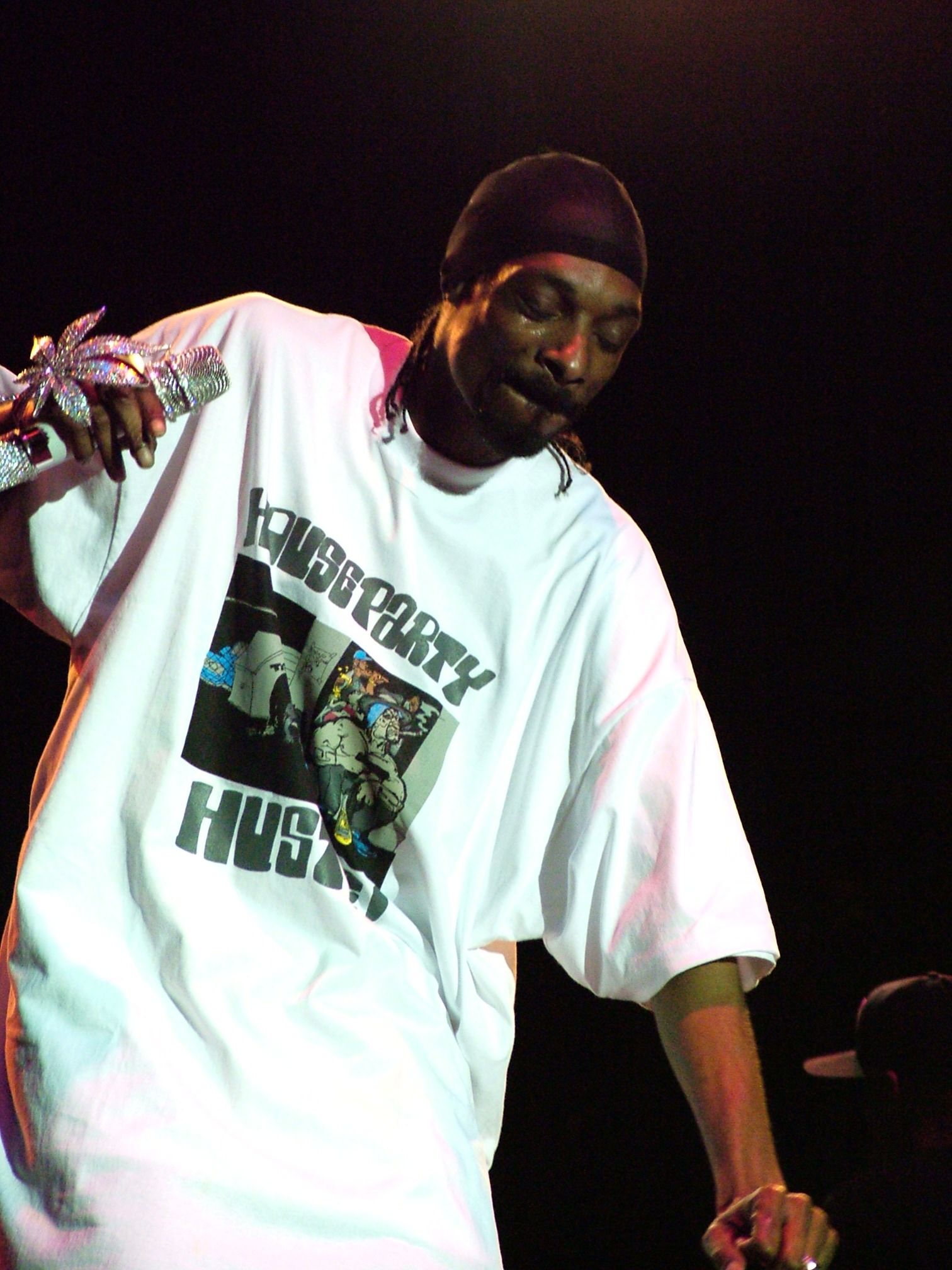
- Snoop Dogg performing at City Stages in March 2006
- Studio albums: 22
- EPs: 3
- Soundtrack albums: 4
- Compilation albums: 17
- Video albums: 1
- Mixtapes: 26
- Collaborative albums: 5

American rapper Snoop Dogg has released 22 studio albums, five collaborative albums, four soundtrack albums, 17 compilation albums, one video album, three extended plays (EPs) and 26 mixtapes (including seven collaborative mixtapes). Snoop Dogg has sold over 23.5 million albums in the United States—and as many as 37 million worldwide. Throughout his career, Snoop has garnered three number-one albums on the US Billboard 200.

== Albums ==
=== Studio albums ===
List of studio albums, with selected chart positions, sales figures and certifications
| Title | Album details | Peak chart positions | | | | | | | | | | Sales | Certifications (sales threshold) |
| Title | Album details | US | US R&B | AUS | BEL | CAN | FRA | GER | NZ | SWI | UK | Sales | Certifications (sales threshold) |
|---|---|---|---|---|---|---|---|---|---|---|---|---|---|
| Doggystyle (as Snoop Doggy Dogg) | Released: November 23, 1993; Label: Death Row, Interscope; Format: CD, LP, cassette, digital download | 1 | 1 | 24 | — | 10 | — | 21 | 25 | 24 | 38 | US: 6,957,800 (Note: Sales as of 2015.) | RIAA: 4× Platinum; BPI: Platinum; MC: Platinum; RMNZ: Platinum; SNEP: Gold |
| Tha Doggfather (as Snoop Doggy Dogg) | Released: November 12, 1996; Label: Death Row, Interscope; Format: CD, LP, cassette, digital download | 1 | 1 | 12 | 45 | 2 | 9 | 23 | 6 | 41 | 15 | US: 2,000,000 (Note: Sales as of 2008.) | RIAA: 2× Platinum; BPI: Gold; MC: Platinum; RMNZ: Gold |
| Da Game Is to Be Sold, Not to Be Told | Released: August 4, 1998; Label: No Limit, Priority; Format: CD, LP, cassette, digital download | 1 | 1 | 14 | — | 4 | 44 | 24 | 11 | 50 | 28 | US: 2,085,000 | RIAA: 2× Platinum; BPI: Silver; MC: Platinum |
| No Limit Top Dogg | Released: May 11, 1999; Label: No Limit, Priority; Format: CD, LP, cassette, digital download | 2 | 1 | 48 | — | 10 | 53 | 46 | 25 | — | 48 | US: 1,518,000 | RIAA: Platinum; BPI: Gold; MC: Gold |
| Tha Last Meal | Released: December 19, 2000; Label: Doggystyle, No Limit, Priority; Format: CD, LP, cassette, digital download | 4 | 1 | 38 | 47 | 15 | 13 | 55 | 19 | 81 | 62 | US: 2,068,000 | RIAA: Platinum; BPI: Gold; MC: Platinum; SNEP: Gold |
| Paid tha Cost to Be da Boss | Released: November 26, 2002; Label: Doggystyle, Priority, Capitol; Format: CD, LP, cassette, digital download | 12 | 3 | 55 | 48 | 34 | 17 | 46 | 27 | 48 | 64 | US: 1,300,000 | RIAA: Platinum; BPI: Gold; MC: Gold; SNEP: Gold |
| R&G (Rhythm & Gangsta): The Masterpiece | Released: November 16, 2004; Label: Doggystyle, Star Trak, Geffen; Format: CD, LP, cassette, digital download | 6 | 4 | 38 | 11 | 8 | 14 | 14 | 11 | 13 | 12 | US: 1,724,000 | RIAA: Platinum; ARIA: Gold; BPI: Platinum; BVMI: Gold; IFPI SWI: Gold; MC: Platinum; RMNZ: Platinum; SNEP: Gold |
| Tha Blue Carpet Treatment | Released: November 21, 2006; Label: Doggystyle, Geffen; Format: CD, LP, digital download | 5 | 2 | 56 | 46 | 10 | 8 | 41 | 20 | 12 | 47 | US: 903,000 | RIAA: Gold; BPI: Silver; SNEP: Gold; NFPF: Gold; MC: Gold |
| Ego Trippin' | Released: March 11, 2008; Label: Doggystyle, Geffen; Format: CD, LP, digital download | 3 | 2 | 29 | 27 | 3 | 19 | 29 | 24 | 9 | 23 | US: 401,000 (Note: Sales as of 2011.) | NFPF: Gold |
| Malice n Wonderland | Released: December 8, 2009; Label: Doggystyle, Priority, Capitol; Format: CD, LP, digital download | 23 | 5 | — | — | 70 | 62 | — | — | 74 | 155 | US: 400,000 | |
| Doggumentary | Released: March 29, 2011; Label: Doggystyle, Priority, Capitol; Format: CD, LP, digital download | 8 | 4 | 12 | 30 | 28 | 36 | 44 | 35 | 16 | 44 | US: 123,000 | |
| Reincarnated (as Snoop Lion) | Released: April 23, 2013; Label: Berhane Sound System, Boss Lady, Mad Decent, Vice, RCA; Format: CD, LP, digital download | 16 | — | 23 | 45 | 14 | 56 | 20 | 31 | 13 | 34 | US: 104,000 | |
| Bush | Released: May 12, 2015; Label: Doggystyle, i am OTHER, Columbia; Format: CD, LP, digital download | 14 | 1 | 32 | 42 | 13 | 23 | 32 | 39 | 15 | 25 | | |
| Coolaid | Released: July 1, 2016; Label: Doggystyle, E1 Music; Format: CD, LP, digital download | 40 | 5 | 51 | 122 | 37 | 146 | 67 | — | 19 | 122 | | |
| Neva Left | Released: May 19, 2017; Label: Doggystyle, Empire; Format: CD, LP, digital download | 54 | 26 | 94 | 78 | 39 | 96 | — | — | 19 | — | | |
| Bible of Love | Released: March 16, 2018; Label: All the Time, RCA Inspiration; Format: CD, LP, digital download | 148 | — | — | — | — | — | — | — | — | — | | |
| I Wanna Thank Me | Released: August 16, 2019; Label: Doggystyle, Empire; Format: CD, LP, digital download | 76 | 41 | — (Note: I Wanna Thank Me did not enter the ARIA Albums Chart, but peaked at number 25 on the ARIA Digital Album Chart.) | 63 | 83 | 129 | — | — | 23 | — | | |
| From tha Streets 2 tha Suites | Released: April 20, 2021; Label: Doggystyle; Format: CD, LP, digital download | — | — | — | — | — | — | — | — | — | — | | |
| BODR | Released: February 11, 2022; Label: Death Row; Format: Digital download | 104 | — | — | 83 | 97 | — | — | — | 28 | — | | |
| Missionary | Released: December 13, 2024; Label: Death Row, Aftermath, Interscope; Format: CD, LP, digital download | 20 | 7 | 27 | 35 | 34 | 26 | 7 | 19 | 4 | 24 | US: 38,000 | |
| Iz It a Crime? | Released: May 15, 2025; Label: Death Row; Format: CD, LP, digital download | — | — | — | — | — | — | — | — | — | — | | |
| 10 Til' Midnight | Released: April 10, 2026; Label: Death Row; Format: CD, LP, digital download | — | — | — | — | — | — (Note: 10 Til' Midnight did not enter the French Top Albums chart, but peaked at number 90 on the French Physical Albums chart.) | — | — | — | — | | |

=== Collaborative albums ===
List of collaborative albums, with selected chart positions, sales figures and certifications
| Title | Album details | Peak chart positions | | | | Sales | Certifications (sales threshold) |
| Title | Album details | US | US R&B | US Ind. | CAN | Sales | Certifications (sales threshold) |
|---|---|---|---|---|---|---|---|
| Tha Eastsidaz (with Big Tray Deee and Goldie Loc as Tha Eastsidaz) | Released: February 1, 2000; Label: Dogghouse, TVT; Format: CD, LP, cassette, digital download | 8 | 5 | 1 | 8 | US: 1,000,000 | RIAA: Platinum; MC: Gold |
| Duces 'n Trayz: The Old Fashioned Way (with Big Tray Deee and Goldie Loc as Tha Eastsidaz) | Released: July 31, 2001; Label: Doggystyle, TVT; Format: CD, LP, cassette, digital download | 4 | 2 | 1 | — | US: 839,000 | RIAA: Gold; MC: Gold |
| The Hard Way (with Nate Dogg and Warren G as 213) | Released: August 17, 2004; Label: Doggystyle, TVT; Format: CD, LP, cassette | 4 | 1 | 1 | 3 | US: 500,000 | MC: Gold |
| 7 Days of Funk (with Dam-Funk as 7 Days of Funk) | Released: December 10, 2013; Label: Stones Throw; Format: CD, LP, digital download | — | 27 | 33 | — | | |
| Bush (with Pharrell Williams) | Released: May 12, 2015; Label: Doggystyle, i am OTHER, Columbia; Format: CD, LP, digital download | 14 | 1 | — | — | | |
| Cuzznz (with Daz Dillinger as Daz-N-Snoop) | Released: January 15, 2016; Label: Felder; Format: CD, digital download | — | — | — | — | | |
| Snoop Cube 40 $hort (with E-40, Ice Cube, and Too Short as Mount Westmore) | Released: December 8, 2022; Label: MNRK; Format: CD, digital download | 188 | — | — | — | | |

=== Soundtrack albums ===
List of soundtrack albums, with selected chart positions, sales figures and certifications
| Title | Album details | Peak chart positions | | | | | | | Sales | Certifications (sales threshold) |
| Title | Album details | US | US R&B | BEL | CAN | FRA | GER | NL | Sales | Certifications (sales threshold) |
|---|---|---|---|---|---|---|---|---|---|---|
| Murder Was the Case (The Soundtrack) (with Death Row Records) | Released: October 15, 1994; Label: Death Row, Interscope; Format: LP, CD, digital download | 1 | 1 | — | — | — | — | — | US: 2,000,000 | RIAA: 2× Platinum; MC: Gold |
| Bones: Original Motion Picture Houndtrack (with various artists) | Released: October 9, 2001; Label: Doggystyle, Priority; Format: LP, CD, digital download | 34 | 14 | — | — | — | — | — | | |
| The Wash (with various artists) | Released: November 6, 2001; Label: Aftermath, Doggystyle, Interscope; Format: LP, CD, digital download | 19 | 5 | — | 9 | 21 | 20 | 15 | US: 500,000 | RIAA: Gold |
| Mac & Devin Go to High School (with Wiz Khalifa) | Released: December 13, 2011; Label: Rostrum, Doggystyle, Atlantic, Priority; Format: CD, digital download | 29 | 6 | 9 | — | — | — | — | US: 435,500 | RIAA: Gold |

=== Compilation albums ===
List of compilation albums, with selected chart positions and certifications
| Title | Album details | Peak chart positions | | | | | | | | | Certifications (sales threshold) |
| Title | Album details | US | US R&B | AUS | BEL | FRA | NL | NZ | SWI | UK | Certifications (sales threshold) |
|---|---|---|---|---|---|---|---|---|---|---|---|
| Smokefest Underground | Released: May 19, 1998; Label: DoggHouse, Priority; Format: CD, LP, cassette, digital download | — | — | — | — | — | — | — | — | — | |
| Dead Man Walkin' | Released: October 31, 2000; Label: Death Row; Format: CD, LP, cassette, digital download | 24 | 11 | 94 (Note: Due to technical problems, Dead Man Walkin' charted on the ARIA Singles Chart, not the Albums Chart.) | — | — | — | 48 | — | — | |
| Death Row: Snoop Doggy Dogg at His Best | Released: October 23, 2001; Label: Death Row, Priority; Format: CD, LP, cassette, digital download | 28 | 18 | 86 | — | — | 89 | 9 | 80 | 90 | BPI: Gold; RIANZ: Gold |
| Doggy Style Allstars Vol. 1 | Released: August 13, 2002; Label: Doggystyle; Format: CD, LP, cassette, digital download | 19 | 8 | 53 | — | 34 | — | — | 72 | — | |
| Tha Dogg: Best of the Works | Released: December 9, 2003; Label: Death Row; Format: CD, LP, cassette, digital download | — | — | — | — | — | — | — | — | — | |
| The Best of Snoop Dogg | Released: September 28, 2005; Label: Priority; Format: CD, LP, digital download | 121 | 44 | — | 63 | — | 72 | — | 100 | 50 | |
| From Compton to Long Beach | Released: October 3, 2005; Label: Death Row; Format: CD | — | — | — | — | — | — | — | — | — | |
| Bigg Snoop Dogg Presents...Welcome to tha Chuuch: Da Album | Released: December 13, 2005; Label: Doggystyle, Koch; Format: CD, LP, digital download | 184 | 36 | — | — | 184 | — | — | — | — | |
| Unreleased Heatrocks | Released: January 2007; Label: Doggystyle, MySpace; Format: Digital download | — | — | — | — | — | — | — | — | — | |
| Legend of Hip Hop | Released: February 6, 2007; Label: K-Town; Format: CD, digital download | — | — | — | — | — | — | — | — | — | |
| The Big Squeeze | Released: April 24, 2007; Label: Doggystyle, Koch; Format: CD, digital download | 71 | 17 | — | — | — | — | — | — | — | |
| Getcha Girl Dogg | Released: January 4, 2008; Label: K-Town; Format: CD, digital download | — | — | — | — | — | — | — | — | — | |
| Christmas in tha Dogg House | Released: December 16, 2008; Label: Doggystyle, Gangsta Grooves; Format: Digital download | — | — | — | — | — | — | — | — | — | |
| Bacc to tha Chuuch, Vol. 1 | Released: August 4, 2009; Label: Doggystyle, Gangsta Grooves; Format: Digital download | — | — | — | — | — | — | — | — | — | |
| Death Row: The Lost Sessions Vol. 1 | Released: October 13, 2009; Label: WIDEawake, Death Row; Format: CD, digital download | 129 | 22 | — | — | — | — | — | — | — | |
| Snoop Dogg Presents: The West Coast Blueprint | Released: February 23, 2010; Label: Priority; Format: CD, digital download | — | 84 | — | — | — | — | — | — | — | |
| My #1 Priority | Released: July 13, 2010; Label: Priority; Format: CD, digital download | — | — | — | — | — | — | — | — | — | |
| Snoop Dogg Presents Algorithm | Released: November 19, 2021; Label: Doggystyle, Def Jam; Format: CD, LP, digital download | 166 | — | — | — | — | — | — | 95 | — | |
| Metaverse: The NFT Drop, Vol. 1 | Released: May 20, 2022; Label: Real Talk; Format: Digital download | — | — | — | — | — | — | — | — | — | |
| Snoop Dogg Presents Death Row Summer 2022 | Released: June 17, 2022; Label: Death Row; Format: Digital download | — | — | — | — | — | — | — | — | — | |
| Metaverse: The NFT Drop, Vol. 2 | Released: September 2, 2022; Label: Real Talk; Format: Digital download | — | — | — | — | — | — | — | — | — | |

=== Video albums ===
List of video albums, with selected chart positions and certifications
| Title | Album details | Peak chart positions | | Certifications | Notes |
| Title | Album details | US Video | AUS DVD | Certifications | Notes |
|---|---|---|---|---|---|
| The Up in Smoke Tour | Released: December 5, 2000; Label: RED Distribution, Eagle Rock (30001); Format: DVD, UMD, VHS | 1 | 1 | RIAA: 6× Platinum; ARIA: 8× Platinum; SNEP: 2× Platinum; BVMI: Gold | The Up in Smoke Tour is a concert film of a concert held in Worcester, Massachusetts, as part of the 2000 Up in Smoke Tour. It features live performances as well as backstage content from various rappers, including Dr. Dre, Snoop Dogg, Ice Cube and Eminem. The film, rendered for DVD in Dolby Digital 5.1 audio compression, is directed by Philip G. Atwell and narrated by Dr. Dre. |

== Extended plays ==
List of extended plays, with selected chart positions
| Title | EP details | Peak chart positions | | |
| Title | EP details | US | US Ind. | US R&B |
|---|---|---|---|---|
| Stoner's EP | Released: April 17, 2012; Label: Gangsta Gangsta Online; Format: Digital download | 167 | 31 | 33 |
| Make America Crip Again | Released: October 27, 2017; Label: Doggystyle, Empire; Format: CD, digital download | — | — | — |
| 220 | Released: February 20, 2018; Label: Doggystyle, Empire; Format: Digital download | — | — | — |

== Mixtapes ==
| Title | Mixtape details |
|---|---|
| Welcome to tha Chuuch, Vol. 1 | Released: 2003; Label: Doggystyle; Format: CD, digital download |
| Welcome to tha Chuuch, Vol. 2 | Released: 2003; Label: Doggystyle; Format: CD, digital download |
| Westside Reloaded (with DJ Whoo Kid) | Released: June 24, 2003; Label: Self-released; Format: CD |
| Welcome to tha Chuuch, Vol. 3 | Released: September 30, 2003; Label: Doggystyle; Format: CD, LP, digital download |
| Welcome to tha Chuuch, Vol. 4 (Sunday School) | Released: March 9, 2004; Label: Doggystyle; Format: CD, LP, digital download |
| Welcome to tha Chuuch, Vol. 5 (The Revival) | Released: April 20, 2004; Label: Doggystyle; Format: CD, digital download |
| Welcome to tha Chuuch, Vol. 6 (Testify) | Released: February 7, 2005; Label: Doggystyle; Format: CD, digital download |
| Welcome to tha Chuuch, Vol. 7 (Step Ya Game Up) | Released: February 28, 2005; Label: Doggystyle; Format: CD, digital download |
| Welcome to tha Chuuch, Vol. 8 (Preach Tabernacal) | Released: April 11, 2005; Label: Doggystyle; Format: CD, digital download |
| Welcome to tha Chuuch, Vol. 9 (Run Tell Dat) | Released: 2005; Label: Doggystyle; Format: CD, digital download |
| Tha Blue Carpet Treatment Mixtape | Released: November 18, 2006; Label: CMP; Format: CD, digital download |
| Mandatory Hyphy (with JT tha Bigga Figga) | Released: March 6, 2007; Label: Get Low Digital; Format: CD, digital download |
| The City Is In Good Hands (with DJ Drama) | Released: July 4, 2008; Label: Self-released; Format: CD, digital download |
| I Wanna Rock Mixtape | Released: November 23, 2009; Label: Self-released; Format: Digital download |
| We da West, Vol. 1 | Released: March 2, 2010; Label: Self-released; Format: Digital download |
| Tha Unreleased, Vol. 1 | Released: June 15, 2010; Label: Howie McDuffie; Format: Digital download |
| Puff Puff Pass Tuesdays Mixtape, Vol. 1 | Released: February 16, 2011; Label: Self-released; Format: Digital download |
| Throw Your Dubs Up (with Battlecat and MistaJam) | Released: October 4, 2011; Label: Doggystyle; Format: Digital download |
| That's My Work, Vol. 1 (with Tha Dogg Pound) | Released: November 27, 2012; Label: Gangsta Gangsta Online, Doggystyle; Format: Digital download |
| That's My Work 2 | Released: October 29, 2013; Label: Doggystyle; Format: Digital download |
| That's My Work 3 | Released: February 27, 2014; Label: Doggystyle; Format: Digital download |
| That's My Work 4 | Released: July 15, 2014; Label: Doggystyle; Format: Digital download |
| That's My Work 5 | Released: September 18, 2014; Label: Doggystyle; Format: Digital download |
| Beach City | Released: November 5, 2015; Label: Doggystyle; Format: Digital download |
| Gangsta Grillz: I Still Got It (with DJ Drama) | Released: October 20, 2022; Label: Death Row; Format: CD, digital download |
