= Doggy Style Records discography =

This article shows all releases by Doggystyle Records, split by year.

== 2000 ==
- Tha Eastsidaz - Snoop Dogg Presents Tha Eastsidaz
- Snoop Dogg - Tha Last Meal

== 2001 ==
- Doggy's Angels - Pleezbaleevit!
- Tha Eastsidaz - Duces 'N Trayz: The Old Fashioned Way
- Bad Azz - Personal Business
- Various artists - Bones soundtrack
- Various artists - The Wash soundtrack

== 2002 ==
- Various artists - Snoop Dogg Presents…Doggy Style Allstars Vol. 1
- Snoop Dogg - Paid tha Cost to Be da Bo$$

== 2004 ==
- Snoop Dogg - R&G (Rhythm & Gangsta) The Masterpiece
- 213 - The Hard Way
- Welcome to tha chuuch mixtape vol.5 - The revival (Official mixtape)
- Welcome to tha chuuch mixtape vol.6 - Testify (Official mixtape)
- Welcome to tha chuuch mixtape vol.7 - Step ya game up (Official mixtape)
- Welcome to tha chuuch mixtape vol.8 - Preach Tabarnacal (Official mixtape)

== 2005 ==
- Welcome to tha chuuch mixtape vol.9 - Run Tell dat - The one and only (Official mixtape)
- Various artists - Welcome to tha Chuuch - Da Album
- IV Life Records & Tha Eastsidaz - Deuces, Tray's and Fo's (Doggystyle/IV Life)

== 2006 ==
- West Coast Gangstas Starring - Tha Dogg Pound mixtape
- Tha Dogg Pound - Cali Iz Active
- Snoop Dogg - Tha Blue Carpet Treatment mixtape
- Snoop Dogg - The Blue Carpet Treatment

== 2007 ==
- Various - Snoop Dogg presents : Unreleased Heatrocks
- Various - Snoop Dogg presents : The Big Squeeze
- Various - Mandatory Business soundtrack

== 2008 ==
- Snoop Dogg - Ego Trippin'
- Dubb Union - Snoop Dogg Presents: Dubb Union

== 2009 ==
- Snoop Dogg - Malice n Wonderland
- Various - Snoop Dogg presents: Bacc to tha Chuuch Vol.1

== 2010 ==
- Snoop Dogg - More Malice

== 2011 ==
- Snoop Dogg - Doggumentary

== 2015 ==
- Snoop Dogg - BUSH

== 2016 ==
- Snoop Dogg - Coolaid
- Jooba Loc - Only Way Out
- Kurupt - Equinox
- Various - The Return Of Doggy Style Records Mixtape
- Heebz Street featuring Iliana Eve - "Letters"
