= That's My Work 4 =

Mixtape by Tha Eastsidaz
- Released: July 15, 2014
- Recorded: 2003–2014
- Genre: Hip hop
- Length: 73:15
- Label: Doggy Style

Tha Eastsidaz chronology
| Duces 'n Trayz (2001) | That's My Work 4 (2014) | Still Easty (2024) |

Snoop Dogg chronology
| That's My Work 3 (2014) | That's My Work 4 (2014) | That's My Work 5 (2014) |

That's My Work 4 is a mixtape by American rap group Tha Eastsidaz. The mixtape is hosted by DJ Drama and was released free for digital download on July 15, 2014.

== Track listing ==
| No. | Title | Producer(s) | Length |
|---|---|---|---|
| 1. | "Intro Beast" | Fredwreck | 2:45 |
| 2. | "Get U Right" | Scoop DeVille | 4:49 |
| 3. | "Payday" (featuring Clever) | Fredwreck | 4:44 |
| 4. | "Can't Trust Em" | | 3:18 |
| 5. | "Milk n Honey" | Fredwreck | 4:20 |
| 6. | "Bottom Girl" (featuring Nate Dogg & Kokane) | Battlecat | 3:58 |
| 7. | "Run Up On Us" | Battlecat | 2:19 |
| 8. | "Parking Lot Pimpin'" (featuring Truth Hurts) | Fredwreck | 4:08 |
| 9. | "Wake UP" | Snoop Dogg & L.T. Hutton | 4:40 |
| 10. | "Can't Let It Go" | | 5:01 |
| 11. | "Put 1 pon the Air" | | 3:39 |
| 12. | "Somethings Neva Change" (featuring Xzibit & Erik "The Anthem" Lee) | Erik "The Anthem" Lee | 3:54 |
| 13. | "Commercial" | | 1:37 |
| 14. | "Bacc on da Blocc" | Quazedelic & Josef Leimberg | 4:03 |
| 15. | "Crowns In" | Erik "The Anthem" Lee | 3:06 |
| 16. | "City of G'z" | Erik "The Anthem" Lee | 3:40 |
| 17. | "Bacc Up Hoes" | Battlecat | 4:16 |
| 18. | "Let's Go" (featuring Nate Dogg & Ricky Harris) | Battlecat | 4:45 |
| 19. | "Commercial" | | 0:40 |
| 20. | "Me & Mines" | Jansport J | 3:46 |
