= Iz It a Crime? =

Studio album by Snoop Dogg
- Released: May 15, 2025
- Recorded: 2024–2025
- Genre: West Coast hip-hop; gangsta rap; G-funk
- Length: 57:17
- Label: Death Row; Gamma.
- Producer: Battlecat; Nottz; Rick Rock; Snoop Dogg; Soopafly; Pharrell Williams; Bigg D; Lamb; Big Duke; Dae One; Blaqthoven; MyGuyMars

Snoop Dogg chronology
Missionary (2024)	Iz It a Crime? (2025)	10 Til' Midnight (2026)

Singles from Iz It a Crime?
- 1. "Me n OG Snoop" Released: May 14, 2025

Professional ratings
Review scores
Source	Rating
Cult MTL	5/10
Pitchfork	6.1/10
Rolling Stone	3/5 stars
Slant Magazine	3/5 stars

Iz It a Crime? is the twenty-first studio album by American rapper Snoop Dogg, released by Death Row Records and Gamma on May 15, 2025. Guest features include October London, LaRussell, Jane Handcock, Charlie Bereal, Stresmatic, Wiz Khalifa, J-Black, Akeem Ali, Pharrell Williams, Tonio Armani, Mr. Porter, Blaqthoven, and Sexyy Red. The album is a follow-up to his previous album, Missionary, which was released almost 5 months prior in December 2024.

== Background and promotion ==
On May 13, 2025, Snoop Dogg revealed the album when he interviewed Access Hollywood about the album as he stated: "Just some of the things that I do, that I’ve done, that have been speculation, and I just want to ask the question, "Is it a crime? Is it a crime for me to do the things that I do? Is it a crime for me to take care of people, to love people, to be there for people? Is it a crime for me to be me?" He would officially announce the album on social media by posting the front and back cover. The following day, he interviewed The Breakfast Club about his inspiration to continue rapping as a long-time figure in hip-hop.

The background behind the title Iz It a Crime? connects to recent public scrutiny of his performance at an inaugural celebration of Donald Trump's second term. An accompanying short film was released as a visual representation of the album. It was previewed at a private screening in New York City on May 13, before officially releasing on his YouTube channel the following day.

The track "ShutYoBitchAssUp" serves as a diss track targeted to former Death Row CEO and co-founder Suge Knight.

== Track listing ==
Iz It a Crime? track listing
No.	Title	Writer(s)	Producer	Length
1.	"Intro"	Calvin Broadus	Snoop Dogg	0:17
2.	"Iz It a Crime" (featuring October London)	Broadus; Jared Erskine	Major Seven; A.G.	2:19
3.	"Joy"	Broadus	Cainon Lamb; Bigg D	2:48
4.	"Unsung Heroes"	Broadus	Big Duke	2:13
5.	"Sophisticated Crippin'"	Broadus	Battlecat	3:22
6.	"Can't Wait" (featuring LaRussell)	Broadus; Larussell Thomas	Nottz	2:52
7.	"Can't Get Enough" (featuring Jane Handcock)	Broadus; Jane Handcock	Battlecat	2:52
8.	"Keep It Moving" (featuring Charlie Bereal and Stresmatic)	Broadus; Charlie Bereal; Thomas Jackson	Rick Rock	2:54
9.	"Just the Way It Iz" (featuring J-Black and Wiz Khalifa)	Broadus; James Fawole; Cameron Thomaz	Soopafly	3:15
10.	"You Want My All" (featuring Akeem Ali)	Broadus; Akeem Ali	Battlecat	3:48
11.	"What's Hattnin?" (featuring Charlie Bereal)	Broadus; Bereal	Charlie Bereal	1:33
12.	"Spot" (featuring Pharrell Williams and Tonio Armani)	Broadus; Pharrell Williams; Travis Gardner	Pharrell Williams	2:43
13.	"ShutYoBitchAssUp" (featuring Stresmatic)	Broadus; Jackson	Rick Rock	1:58
14.	"Cold Summer" (featuring Denaun)	Broadus; Denaun Porter	Denaun Porter	2:19
15.	"Snoop Will Make You Dance"	Broadus	Battlecat	3:05
16.	"Life's Journey" (featuring Blaqthoven)	Broadus; Anthony Ransom	Dae One; Blaqthoven	2:25
17.	"Me n OG Snoop" (featuring Sexyy Red)	Broadus; Janae Wherry	MyGuyMars	2:38
18.	"Let Me Love You"	Broadus	Nottz	3:31
19.	"West Up"	Broadus	Battlecat	2:47
20.	"My Friend" (featuring Denaun)	Broadus; Porter	Denaun Porter	4:23
21.	"Live Life"	Broadus	Bigg D; Cainon Lamb	3:06
Total length:				57:17

== Charts ==
Chart performance for Iz It a Crime?
Chart (2025)	Peak position
UK Album Downloads (Official Charts)	74
