= Death Row: Snoop Doggy Dogg at His Best =

Greatest hits album by Snoop Doggy Dogg
- Released: October 23, 2001
- Recorded: 1992–1996
- Length: 73:39
- Labels: Death Row; Priority
- Producers: Suge Knight (exec.); Dr. Dre; L.T. Hutton; DJ Pooh; Soopafly; Jimmy Jam and Terry Lewis; Kurt "Kobane" Couthon; Timbaland; Snoop Doggy Dogg; Terry Date

Snoop Doggy Dogg chronology
Duces 'n Trayz: The Old Fashioned Way (2001)	Death Row: Snoop Doggy Dogg at His Best (2001)	Paid tha Cost to Be da Boss (2002)

Professional ratings
Review scores
Source	Rating
The Rolling Stone Album Guide	4/5 stars

Death Row: Snoop Doggy Dogg at His Best is the first greatest hits album that includes his hits and also includes 6 never before released songs from Snoop Dogg's Death Row Records days. It was released on October 23, 2001, by Suge Knight. It was re-released on March 20, 2006.

Although this CD was released in 2001, it only featured songs that Snoop Dogg had recorded during his Death Row era. Therefore, none of the songs from his No Limit releases, "Da Game Is to Be Sold, Not to Be Told", "No Limit Top Dogg", or "Tha Last Meal" were included on this album, even though they were released before this one. The album title, Death Row: Snoop Doggy Dogg at His Best, can also be interpreted as a subtle shot at Snoop Dogg, implying that his work after leaving Death Row was of lesser quality.

== Track listing ==
No.	Title	Producer(s)	Length
1.	"Nuthin' But a "G" Thang" (featuring Dr. Dre, from the Chronic)	Dr. Dre	3:59
2.	"Head Doctor" (featuring Swoop G, from Dead Man Walkin')	Curtis Couthon	4:26
3.	"Gin and Juice" (from Doggystyle)	Dr. Dre	3:32
4.	"Eastside Party" (featuring Nate Dogg, previously unreleased)	Jimmy Jam and Terry Lewis	5:33
5.	"Murder Was the Case" (Remix, from Murder Was the Case)	Dr. Dre	4:20
6.	"Ain't No Fun (If the Homies Can't Have None)" (featuring Nate Dogg, Kurupt and Warren G, from Doggystyle)	Dr. Dre	4:01
7.	"Doggfather" (Remix, previously unreleased)	Timbaland; Lonnie Simmons	5:17
8.	"Midnight Love" (featuring Daz Dillinger and Raphael Saadiq)	Soopafly; Snoop Doggy Dogg	4:45
9.	"Eastside" (featuring tha Eastsidaz and Daz Dillinger, previously unreleased)	L.T. Hutton	3:35
10.	"Who Am I (What's My Name)?" (from Doggystyle)	Dr. Dre	4:04
11.	"Doggy Dogg World" (featuring the Dramatics and tha Dogg Pound, from Doggystyle)	Dr. Dre	5:05
12.	"Too High (Poly High)" (featuring Daz Dillinger, the Twinz and Big Pimpin', previously unreleased)	L.T. Hutton	5:10
13.	"Vapors" (from Tha Doggfather)	DJ Pooh	4:22
14.	"Usual Suspects" (featuring Threat, previously unreleased)	L.T. Hutton	4:45
15.	"Keep It Real" (featuring Bad Azz, Kurupt, Mack 10, Techniec and Threat, previously unreleased)	Soopafly	5:00
16.	"Snoop Bounce" (Roc N Roll Remix featuring Charlie Wilson and Rage Against the Machine, previously unreleased)	Terry Date	5:35
Total length:			1:13:39

== Charts ==
Weekly chart performance for Death Row: Snoop Doggy Dogg at His Best
Chart (2001)	Peak position
Australian Albums (ARIA)	86
Canadian Albums (Billboard)	19
Dutch Albums (Album Top 100)	89
French Albums (SNEP)	8
New Zealand Albums (RMNZ)	9
Swiss Albums (Schweizer Hitparade)	80
UK Albums (Official Charts)	90
UK R&B Albums (Official Charts)	13
US Billboard 200	28
US Top R&B/Hip-Hop Albums (Billboard)	18

== Certifications ==
Region	Certification	Certified units/sales
New Zealand (RMNZ)	Gold	7,500^{^}
United Kingdom (BPI)	Gold	100,000^{‡}
^{^} Shipments figures based on certification alone.^{‡} Sales+streaming figures based on certification alone.
