= Death Row: The Lost Sessions Vol. 1 =

Death Row - The Lost Sessions Vol. 1

Compilation album by Snoop Doggy Dogg
- Released: October 13, 2009
- Recorded: 1993–1997
- Studio: Death Row Studios
- Genres: West Coast hip-hop; gangsta rap; g-funk
- Length: 1:02:45
- Labels: Death Row; WIDEawake
- Producers: Daz Dillinger; Dr. Dre; L.T. Hutton; Snoop Doggy Dogg; Soopafly

Snoop Doggy Dogg chronology
| Bacc to tha Chuuch, Vol.1 (2009) | Death Row - The Lost Sessions Vol. 1 (2009) | I Wanna Rock Mixtape (2009) |

Professional ratings
Review scores
| Source | Rating |
|---|---|
| AllMusic | 3.5/5 stars |

Death Row - The Lost Sessions Vol. 1 is a compilation album by American rapper Snoop Dogg. It was released in October 2009 via Death Row/WIDEawake Entertainment. The album is composed of leftover material that Snoop recorded at Death Row Studios between 1993 and 1997 during his first stint on the label. Production was handled by Dr. Dre, Daz Dillinger, Soopafly, L.T. Hutton and Snoop himself among others. It features contributions from Bad Azz, George Clinton, Jewell, Tha Dogg Pound, Nate Dogg, The Lady of Rage, Techniec, Bo Roc, Mallia Franklin, Kevin Vernado, Big Tray Deee, K-Ci & JoJo, Big Pimpin Delemond, Teena Marie and Rappin' 4-Tay.

The track "Doggystyle" had been intended as the title track for Snoop's first album, Doggystyle, in 1993, but was left off the album. In the United States, the album peaked at number 129 on the Billboard 200, number 22 on the Top R&B/Hip-Hop Albums, number 10 on the Top Rap Albums and number 17 on the Independent Albums charts, as well as reaching number 173 on the Canadian Albums Chart.

== Track listing ==
| No. | Title | Producer(s) | Length |
|---|---|---|---|
| 1. | "Soldier Story (Intro)" | | 1:49 |
| 2. | "Doggystyle" (featuring George Clinton and Jewell) | Dr. Dre | 5:34 |
| 3. | "Fallin' Asleep on Death Row" | Dr. Dre | 2:03 |
| 4. | "Eat a Dick" | Dr. Dre | 2:54 |
| 5. | "Hoez" (featuring Tha Dogg Pound) | Daz Dillinger | 4:53 |
| 6. | "Keep It Real Dogg" | Soopafly | 5:35 |
| 7. | "O.G. (Original Version)" (featuring Nate Dogg) | Daz Dillinger | 4:32 |
| 8. | "One Life to Live" (featuring The Lady of Rage and Techniec) | Snoop Dogg; Soopafly; Daz Dillinger | 5:17 |
| 9. | "The Genie" (featuring Bad Azz and Bo-Roc) | L.T. Hutton | 4:48 |
| 10. | "Funk with Ya Brain (Interlude)" (featuring Mallia Franklin and KV) | L.T. Hutton | 2:32 |
| 11. | "Caught Up" | | 4:40 |
| 12. | "Put It in Ya Mouth" | | 5:32 |
| 13. | "Gravy Train" (featuring Bad Azz and Big Tray Deee) | | 3:05 |
| 14. | "Life's Hard (Dedicated to 2Pac)" (featuring K-Ci & JoJo and Big Pimpin Delemond) | | 4:47 |
| 15. | "The Roots of All Evil (Outro)" (featuring Teena Marie) | Dr. Dre | 4:44 |
| Total length: | | | 1:02:45 |

Best Buy/Napster bonus tracks
| No. | Title | Producer(s) | Length |
|---|---|---|---|
| 16. | "Quite Obvious" (featuring Rappin' 4-Tay) | Soopafly | 4:11 |
| 17. | "Once Again" | Soopafly | 5:02 |
| 18. | "Got to Do Wrong" | L.T. Hutton | 4:40 |

== Personnel ==
- Calvin "Snoop Doggy Dogg" Broadus Jr. – vocals, producer (track 8)
- George Clinton – background vocals (track 2)
- Jewel Caples – background vocals (track 2)
- Delmar "Daz Dillinger" Arnaud – vocals (track 5), producer (tracks: 5, 7, 8)
- Ricardo "Kurupt" Brown – vocals (track 5)
- Nathaniel "Nate Dogg" Hale – vocals (track 7)
- Robin "The Lady of Rage" Allen – vocals (track 8)
- David Keith "Techniec" Williams III – vocals (track 8)
- Jamarr "Bad Azz" Stamps – vocals (tracks: 9, 13)
- Bo Roc – background vocals (track 9)
- Mallia Franklin – background vocals (track 10)
- Kevin Vernado – background vocals (track 10)
- Tracy "Big Tray Deee" Davis – vocals (track 13)
- Cedric "K-Ci" Hailey – vocals (track 14)
- Joel "JoJo" Hailey – vocals (track 14)
- "Big Pimpin" Delemond Williams – vocals (track 14)
- Mary "Teena Marie" Brockert – background vocals (track 15)
- Anthony "Rappin' 4-Tay" Forté – vocals (track 16)
- Andre "Dr. Dre" Young – producer (tracks: 2-4, 15)
- Priest "Soopafly" Brooks – producer (tracks: 6, 8, 16, 17)
- Lenton Terrell Hutton – producer (tracks: 9, 10, 18)
- Justin "Coyote" Burdick – mixing
- Brian "Big Bass" Gardner – mastering
- Sonya Pead – coordinator
- Paul Schultz – art direction
- Jonathan Davenport – graphics

== Charts ==
| Chart (2009) | Peak position |
|---|---|
| Canadian Albums (Jam!) | 173 |
| US Billboard 200 | 129 |
| US Top R&B/Hip-Hop Albums (Billboard) | 22 |
| US Top Rap Albums (Billboard) | 10 |
| US Independent Albums (Billboard) | 17 |
