= Snoop Dogg discography =

Snoop Dogg discography may refer to:

- Snoop Dogg albums discography
- Snoop Dogg singles discography
- List of Snoop Dogg guest appearances
- List of songs recorded by Snoop Dogg
