= Tha Dogg: Best of the Works =

Death Row Records Presents... Tha Dogg: Best of the Works

Greatest hits album by Snoop Doggy Dogg
- Released: December 9, 2003
- Recorded: 1993–1996
- Genre: West Coast hip hop; gangsta rap; G-funk
- Length: 1:00:52
- Label: Death Row
- Producer: Suge Knight
- Compiler: James Winter

Snoop Doggy Dogg chronology
Welcome to tha Chuuuch, Vol. 3 (2003)	Death Row Records Presents... Tha Dogg: Best of the Works (2003)	Welcome to tha Chuuuch, Vol. 4 (Sunday School) (2004)

Professional ratings
Review scores
Source	Rating
Allmusic	

Death Row Records Presents... Tha Dogg: Best of the Works is the second greatest hits album by Snoop Doggy Dogg. It was released by Death Row Records on December 9, 2003. According to its import code of Brasil AA3000 it was pressed for one shipment of 3000 in Brazil. No other sales data are known.

== Track listing ==
No.	Title	Producer(s)	Length
1.	"Doggfather Introduction"	–	0:47
2.	"Who Am I (What's My Name)?" (from Doggystyle)	Dr. Dre	4:07
3.	"May I" (featuring Lil Malik, from Dead Man Walkin')	Soopafly	3:54
4.	"Tha Shiznit" (from Doggystyle)	Dr. Dre	4:40
5.	"Gangsta Walk" (featuring Tha Dogg Pound, from Dead Man Walkin')	Daz Dillinger	5:20
6.	"Snoop's Upside Ya Head" (featuring Charlie Wilson, from Tha Doggfather)	DJ Pooh	4:28
7.	"Ain't No Fun (If the Homies Can't Have None)" (featuring Nate Dogg, Kurupt and Warren G, from Doggystyle)	Dr. Dre	4:06
8.	"Murder Was the Case" (from Doggystyle)	Dr. Dre	3:39
9.	"Up Jump tha Boogie" (featuring Charlie Wilson and Teena Marie, from Tha Doggfather)	DJ Pooh	4:41
10.	"Lodi Dodi" (from Doggystyle)	Dr. Dre	5:02
11.	"2 of Amerikaz Most Wanted" (performed with 2Pac, from All Eyez on Me)	Daz Dillinger	4:06
12.	"Gin and Juice" (from Doggystyle)	Dr. Dre	3:32
13.	"Nuthin' But a "G" Thang" (performed with Dr. Dre, from The Chronic)	Dr. Dre	3:58
14.	"Gz and Hustlas" (from Doggystyle)	Dr. Dre	4:33
15.	"Snoop Bounce" (featuring Charlie Wilson, from Tha Doggfather)	DJ Pooh	4:03
Total length:			1:00:52
