= Battlecat =

Battlecat may refer to:

- Battle Cat, feline companion of He-Man in the Masters of the Universe franchise
- Battlecat (music producer), American hip hop record producer and DJ
