= Quazedelic =

American singer-songwriter

- Also known as: Quaze, Stan Sly, Quaziano
- Born: Stanley Harris Jr.
- Origin: Los Angeles, California, United States
- Genres: Rap; funk; hip hop; West Coast hip hop; soul
- Years active: 1996–present
- Labels: 3rd Door Records, SomeOthaShip Connect, Epistophik Peach Sound, Doggystyle Records
- Member of: Funkadelic, Snoopadelic

Stanley Harris Jr. (born October 11, 1977, in Santa Ana, California, U.S.) is a music producer, rapper and singer in Los Angeles, California. He records under the stage name Quaze or Quazedelic. He received his big break into the music industry when rapper Snoop Dogg signed him to Doggystyle Records in 2001. He is most recognized for his funk music style production. His first major release with the Doggystyle Records crew was on the soundtrack of Undercover Brother, where he produced the single, Give Up the Funk. The song featured Snoop Dogg, Bootsy Collins, Fred Wesley, Kokane and Quazedelic. Later he went on to work with many other Hip-Hop and R&B artists like Angie Stone, Baby Bash, G-Unit, Dub C, Redman, Suga Free and Goldie Loc from the Eastsidaz.

== Early years ==
Quazedelic was born in Santa Ana, California where he was raised as a biracial child. His mother is a Caucasian woman from a small town in Bishop, California and his father was an African American man from Texas. He endured many difficulties as a biracial child and targeted his energy towards his early love for music. By 1982 he was living on the Eastside of Long Beach where he bought his first Atomic Dog 45 album from the famous VIP Records. By 1986 Quaze moved to Alabama with his parents where he experienced even more racial tension in the Cooper Green Projects. He formed a rap group and entered a local radio station rap contest. The rap group won the contest and caught the eye of Anthony Ray also known as Seattle rapper Sir Mix-a-Lot. He started out as a young dancer for the rapper and began touring the South on a Chittlin Circuit Tour. Soon after Quazedelic began producing for the mix-a-lot crew. In 1989 Quaze moved to Vancouver Canada where he started his rap career with rap partner Ease. The two became EQ, one of the first popular-radio spun rap groups to originate from Vancouver Canada.

== Music career ==
From 1997 to 1999 Quazedelic moved to the Bay Area of California where he worked with rappers B-Legit, Baby Bash, Hitman and Bushwick Bill. By 2000 Quazedelic was introduced to Doggystyle Records producer Meech Wells (son of Mary Wells). The introduction came by Trey Lewd (son of George Clinton). Quazedelic's music is heavily influenced by funk musicians George Clinton, Bootsy Collins and Sly Stone. Quazedelic's funk style, live percussion's and singing gave him an original sound. He went on to produce songs with Wells including, Don't Fight the Feelin’, featuring Nate Dogg, Lady May and Roc-A-Fella Records’ Cameron.

In 2004 Quazedelic released a free compilation CD, The Soundscannerz Presents Leak Deaz with production partner Josef Leimberg. The CD went on to gain popularity as it featured well-known American rappers like 50 Cent, Snoop Dogg, Daz Dillinger, Soopafly, Tray Deee and others.

After his success with Doggystyle Records, Quazedelic decided to concentrate on both production and his solo projects. He was contracted by legendary conscious rapper Brother J to collaborate on the X-Clan album, Return From Mecca. Quaze produced five songs on the album, including Space People- in which he sang the hook and appeared on the second verse.

His first solo album entitled, The Electric Underwater Church Movement (TEUWCM) was released through 3rd Door Records in 2006 and primarily produced by himself. The album featured additional production from Josef Leimberg of the Soundscannerz and Proh Mic. Quazedelic recently established the Oneder Friendz with Georgia Anne Muldrow and Dudley Perkins. Collectively they are releasing his new album, The Arrival 2012 A.U. (After Us). The album will be released through 3rd Door Records/ePistrophik Peach Sound which features production of Georgia Anne Muldrow and Quazedelic himself. Quazedelic is one of few Hip-Hop artists that acknowledges the date of December 21, 2012. His album touches on the subject and becoming prepared through a higher consciousness. The entire ePistrophik team is all about light and deeper thought to free the mind. This is well displayed in the similar artwork produced for the EPS groups by a Japanese artist name Tokio.

Quazedelic's second album Stan Sly, Anutha World was released on November 9, 2010 through SomeOthaship/ E1 Music. The album is a 10 year compilation and work of art that displays the many talents of the artist known as Quazedelic aka Stan Sly. The album features a track entitled "Hold On" with a collaboration with the artist and Snoop Dogg. Quazedelic also toured with the rapper from 2005 to 2010 as band member of the Snoopadelics.

The summer of 2010 Quazedelic rejoined George Clinton's Parliament Funkadelic Band as one of the youngest members to join and tour as a front runner.

== The Psychedelic Artist ==
Quaze became Quazedelic after his first "experience" in 1994. He had a very spiritual experience that helped him discover a new way of life. This experience drastically influenced his music and how he viewed the world as a whole. From that point on he began creating funky music that focused on higher consciousness and light. His personal music became a note to the world, much in the style of George Clinton. He began touching on subjects like God, inner Connections, the Third Eye, Reflective Thought, Outer Space and beyond. The Arrival 2012 A.U. (After Us) has tracks that discuss the December 21, 2012 theories presented by many prophets and ancient readings like the Mayan calendar and the well known Nostradamus.

== MTV Nomination ==
Quazedelic collaborated with Snoop Dogg on the True Crime: Streets of LA Soundtrack title, Dance Wit Me. He sang a hook that was extremely close to the original voice of singer Marvin Gaye. The song went on to gain much radio play and earned an MTV Video Game Soundtrack Nomination in 2003. Quazedelic is very close to the Marvin Gaye family, as he was hired to produce for Marvin Gaye III from 2000 to 2001.

== Discography ==
Album	Year
Return of the Bumpasaurus	1996
"Senseless: Do you wanna Freak"	1997
Duces 'n Trayz: The Old Fashioned Way	2001
Snoop Dogg Presents…Doggy Style Allstars Vol. 1	2002
Paid tha Cost to Be da Boss	2002
"Undercova Funk (Give Up the Funk)	2002
True Crime: Streets of LA	2003
Welcome to the Chuuch Vol. 1-6	2003
The Hard Way	2004
R&G (Rhythm & Gangsta): The Masterpiece	2004
TEUWCM	2006
Pain Killer'z	2006
The Electric Underwater Church Movement	2007
Return From Mecca	2007
Black Fuzz	2008
The Arrival 2012 (A.U.)	2009
Street Lights	2009
Stan Sly, Anutha World	2010
Funkadelic, First you gotta shake the gate	2014

== Filmography ==
- 1997: Women of Color (soundtrack) (Playboy)
- 1997: Senseless (Universal Pictures)
- 2005: The L.A. Riot Spectacular (Sacrificial Lambs)
- 2005: Boss'n Up (Cameo as Tamberine the Pimp)
- 2002: Undercover Brother
