= That's My Work 5 =

Mixtape by Tha Dogg Pound
- Released: September 18, 2014
- Recorded: 2014
- Genre: G-funk; gangsta rap
- Length: 73:15
- Label: D.P.G. Online

Tha Dogg Pound chronology
100 Wayz (2010)	That's My Work 5 (2014)

Snoop Dogg chronology
That's My Work 4 (2014)	That's My Work 5 (2014)	Bush (2015)

That's My Work 5 is a mixtape by American rap group Tha Dogg Pound. The mixtape is hosted by DJ Drama. It was released free for digital download on September 18, 2014 and includes 16 songs.

== Track listing ==
No.	Title	Producer(s)	Length
1.	"House Party"		3:48
2.	"Bodyguard Hard"		4:08
3.	"These Hoes" (featuring Chris Brown)		4:50
4.	"Pressure"		3:34
5.	"U Neva Know" (featuring French Montana)		2:57
6.	"6 in da Mornin"	Jansport J	4:08
7.	"Don't Take Nothin" (featuring Mac Shawn)		3:26
8.	"In My Lifetime"	Dâm-Funk	4:37
9.	"Foreign" (featuring Trey Songz)		4:04
10.	"U Dont Know Me Like Dat"		4:04
11.	"Niggaz Iz on Me"		4:28
12.	"Think I Love You"		3:47
13.	"Get a Grip"		4:11
14.	"Everybody Gettin High"		4:39
15.	"Band Dat"		3:51
16.	"Im on It" (featuring Soopafly)		4:32
Total length:			73:15
