= Bigg Snoop Dogg Presents... Welcome to tha Chuuch: Da Album =

2005 compilation album by Snoop Dogg

Compilation album by various artists
- Released: December 13, 2005
- Recorded: 2005
- Genres: West Coast hip hop; gangsta rap; G-funk
- Length: 55:38
- Labels: Doggystyle; Koch
- Producer: Snoop Dogg

Singles from Bigg Snoop Dogg Presents... Welcome to tha Chuuch: Da Album
- 1. "Real Soon" Released: November 2005^{U.S.} April 03, 2006^{AUS; FR}

Bigg Snoop Dogg Presents... Welcome to tha Chuuch: Da Album is a compilation album by Snoop Dogg and various artists. It was released on December 13, 2005 by Doggy Style Records and Koch Records. The "Save Tookie" version of the single "Real Soon", by the DPGC featuring Jamie Foxx, was available to download for free on Doggystyle Records website. It features the reunited Tha Dogg Pound and the comeback for The Lady of Rage.

Track 1, 10 features the artist Mira Craig who is best known in Norway.

There were two videos launched for promotion. One was "Real Soon" with the artists involved as DPGC that gained fair airplay, especially around December, and the other for "Shake That" directed by Mike Taylor of Robot Films and shot in Los Angeles but with St. Louis' color, red, dominating the set. Cameo appearances are made by Warren G and Zab Judah, with the latter being cut off because of his knock out win over St. Louis native Cory Spinks in February 2005 after the video was wrapped. (, ) The two music videos landed on the LAUNCH Music Videos Top 100 at the 37th and 35th spot respectively.

== Critical reception ==
Professional ratings
Review scores
| Source | Rating |
|---|---|
| Allmusic | link |
| The A.V. Club | (B−) link |
| HipHopDX.com | link |
| RapReviews.com | (6.5/10) link |
| Los Angeles Times | link |

The album overall received mixed reviews from music critics.

== Commercial performance ==
The album debuted at number 184 on the US Billboard 200 chart, selling 15,074 copies in its first week.

== Track listing ==
| No. | Title | Producer(s) | Length |
|---|---|---|---|
| 1. | "Sisters N Brothers" (J. Black featuring Mira Craig and Snoop Dogg) | Jellyroll | 3:49 |
| 2. | "Shake That Shit" (Tiffany Foxx featuring Snoop Dogg and Young Walt) | Terrace Martin | 3:55 |
| 3. | "Just the Way You Like It" (Nine Inch Dix) | Soopafly | 5:01 |
| 4. | "Remember Me" (James) | Larrance Dopson | 4:39 |
| 5. | "Real Soon" (D.P.G.C.) | Battlecat | 4:12 |
| 6. | "Sunshine" (J. Black) | Terrace Martin, Marlon Williams | 4:38 |
| 7. | "Can't Find My Panties" (Tiffany Foxx) | L.T. Hutton | 3:42 |
| 8. | "We West Coast" (D.P.G.C.) | Josef Laimsberg | 4:05 |
| 9. | "Dinner In Bed" (Mira Craig) | Mira Craig, Kacey Phillips | 4:41 |
| 10. | "If" (Wendi & YN featuring Snoop Dogg and J. Black) | Terrace Martin | 3:51 |
| 11. | "Notorious DPG" (The Lady of Rage featuring Kurupt and RBX) | Battlecat | 3:55 |
| 12. | "Smokin' All My Bud" (Nine Inch Dix featuring Uncle Reo and Shon Lawon) | Shon Lawon | 5:29 |
| 13. | "Shine" (Mykestro) | Battlecat | 3:43 |
| Total length: | | | 55:38 |

== Singles ==
- 2005 - "Real Soon"
- 2006 - "Shake That Shit"

== Chart performance ==
| Chart (2005) | Peak position |
|---|---|
| US Billboard 200 | 184 |
| US Independent Albums (Billboard) | 8 |
| US Top R&B/Hip-Hop Albums (Billboard) | 36 |

== Bigg Snoop Dogg presents...Welcome 2 tha Chuuch Mixtapes Vol. 1-9 Greatest Hits ==
Welcome 2 tha Chuuch Mixtapes Vol. 1-9 Greatest Hits

Compilation album by Snoop Dogg
- Released: 2009
- Recorded: 2009
- Genres: West Coast hip hop; Gangsta rap
- Length: 60:17
- Labels: Doggystyle; Koch
- Producer: Snoop Dogg

Bigg Snoop Dogg presents...Welcome 2 tha Chuuch Mixtapes Vol. 1-9 Greatest Hits is a 2009 various artists compilation, with songs by Snoop Dogg. It is not an official release or an official mixtape.

=== Track listing ===
- Intro
- A.D.I.D.A.C. (ft. Lil' ½ Dead, Bad Azz, RBX, E-White & Bishop Don Juan)
- Never Scared (ft. Daz)
- Succ A Dicc (ft. Daz & Uncle Junebugg)
- DoDo Remix (ft. Beanie Siegel, Freeway, Soopafly, E-White, Kokane & Jellyroll)
- All I Want (ft. Bad Azz)
- I’m Fly (ft. Nate Dogg & Warren G)
- That’s What This Dicc Will Do (ft. Lil' ½ Dead & Bad Azz)
- Like A Pimp (ft. Daz)
- Getaway
- Angry
- What Would You Do (ft. Lil' ½ Dead, Daddy V & Bad Azz)
- Sippin On Some Moet (ft. Uncle Junebugg, RBX, Twinz, E-White, Daz & Soopafly)
- How 2 Survive
- Keep On Blazin’ (ft. Menenski)
- Pass The Dutch Bitch (ft. Soopafly)
- Come Up To My Room & Fucc
- Crippin’ 2 Tuff
- Dogg House Soulfood (ft. Butch Cassidy, Latoiya Williams & Kokane)
- Stormy Weather (ft. Willie Hutch)

== See also ==
- Boss'n Up
