= Duces 'n Trayz: The Old Fashioned Way =

2001 studio album by Tha Eastsidaz

Duces 'N Trayz: The Old Fashioned Way

Studio album by Tha Eastsidaz
- Released: July 31, 2001
- Genres: West Coast hip-hop; gangsta rap; G-funk
- Length: 79:58
- Labels: TVT; Doggy Style
- Producers: Snoop Dogg (exec.); Alchemist; Battlecat; Fredwreck; Hi-Tek; JellyRoll; Keith Clizark; Meech Wells; Quazedelic; Rick Rock; Swizz Beatz

Tha Eastsidaz chronology
Tha Eastsidaz (2000)	Duces 'n Trayz: The Old Fashioned Way (2001)	That's My Work 4 (2014)

Snoop Dogg chronology
Tha Last Meal (2000)	Duces 'N Trayz: The Old Fashioned Way (2001)	Death Row: Snoop Doggy Dogg at His Best (2001)

Big Tray Deee chronology
Duces 'n Trayz: The Old Fashioned Way (2001)	The General's List (2002)

Singles from Duces 'n Trayz
- 1. "I Luv It" Released: June 2001

Duces 'N Trayz: The Old Fashioned Way is the second studio album by American rap group Tha Eastsidaz, released on July 31, 2001. It was released by TVT Records and Snoop Dogg's Doggy Style Records. The album features the single "I Luv It" and includes the song "Crip Hop" which was also featured in the film, Baby Boy and the corresponding soundtrack.

== Critical reception ==
Professional ratings
Review scores
Source	Rating
Allmusic	4/5 stars
Entertainment Weekly	B+
Los Angeles Times	2.5/4 stars
RapReviews	7.0/10
Vibe	3.5/5 stars
XXL	XL (4/5)

The album overall received positive reviews from music critics.

== Commercial performance ==
Duces 'n Trayz: The Old Fashioned Way debuted at number 4 on the US Billboard 200, selling 116,000 copies in its first week. The album stayed on the chart for nine consecutive weeks. The album peaked at number 15 the previous week on the Canada Top 50 Albums chart for four weeks in a row. It was certificated gold on March 11, 2002

== Track listing ==
No.	Title	Producer(s)	Length
1.	"Intro"	–	1:19
2.	"I Luv It" (featuring Kokane and Sir Dogg)	Battlecat	5:00
3.	"Eastside Ridaz" (featuring Nate Dogg, Soopafly and LaToiya Williams)	Hi-Tek	4:20
4.	"Crip Hop" (featuring LaToiya Williams)	Battlecat	5:17
5.	"I Don't Know" (featuring Suga Free, Soopafly and LaToiya Williams)	Battlecat	4:09
6.	"Welcome 2 tha House" (featuring Tha Angels and Nate Dogg)	Battlecat; DJ Pooh	3:51
7.	"Friends" (featuring Kokane)	The Alchemist	2:58
8.	"Gang Bang 4 Real" (featuring Bad Azz)	Fredwreck	4:51
9.	"I Pledge Allegiance" (featuring Soopafly and Kokane)	Fredwreck	3:48
10.	"Now Is the Time" (featuring Kokane)	Keith Clizark; Meech Wells	3:46
11.	"Cool" (featuring Nate Dogg and Butch Cassidy)	Hi-Tek	5:14
12.	"Dogghouse In Your Mouth" (featuring Suga Free, Soopafly, RBX, Kurupt, Ruff Dog, King Lou, and Mixmaster Spade)	Battlecat	7:10
13.	"Connected" (featuring Mobb Deep and Kokane)	The Alchemist	4:21
14.	"Mac Bible Chapter 211 Verse 20–21" (featuring Mac Minister)	Fredwreck	1:42
15.	"Break a Bitch Til I Die"	Jelly Roll	4:09
16.	"Sticky Fingers" (featuring Kokane and Rick Rock)	Rick Rock	3:14
17.	"There Comes a Time" (featuring Daddy V)	Jelly Roll	4:28
18.	"Late Night" (featuring Kokane)	Meech Wells	2:58
19.	"So Low" (featuring Lil' Mo)	Quazedelic; Meech Wells	3:33
20.	"Everywhere I Go" (featuring Kokane)	Swizz Beatz	4:35
Total length:			1:19:58

== Samples ==
I Luv It

- "Mr. Groove" by One Way

Crip Hop

- "Square Biz" by Teena Marie
- "Ambitionz az a Ridah" by 2Pac

Friends

- "At Long Last" by Moment of Truth. Composers Norman Bergen and Reid Whitelaw

== Charts ==
=== Weekly charts ===
Chart (2001)	Peak position
Australian Albums (ARIA Charts)	54
US Billboard 200	4
US Top R&B/Hip-Hop Albums (Billboard)	2
US Top Independent Albums (Billboard)	1

=== Year-end charts ===
Chart (2001)	Peak position
US Billboard 200	191
US Top R&B/Hip Hop Albums (Billboard)	71

== Certifications ==
Region	Certification	Certified units/sales
Canada (Music Canada)	Gold	50,000^{^}
United States (RIAA)	Gold	839,000
^{^} Shipments figures based on certification alone.
