= Snoop Dogg Presents The Big Squeeze =

The Big Squeeze

Compilation album by Snoop Dogg
- Released: April 24, 2007
- Recorded: 2006–2007
- Genres: West Coast hip hop Gangsta rap G-funk
- Length: 60:27
- Labels: Doggystyle; Koch
- Producers: Niggaracci, Soopafly, David Banner
- Compiler: Snoop Dogg

Snoop Dogg compilation chronology
Mandatory Hyphy (2007)	The Big Squeeze (2007)	Getcha Girl Dogg (2008)

Professional ratings
Review scores
Source	Rating
Allmusic	3/5 stars
RapReviews.com	(7.0/10)
DubCNN.com	3.5/5 stars

The Big Squeeze is a compilation album by Snoop Dogg. It will be followed by a "Making of..." DVD called Niggaracci Presents: Cooked Up Crack. Snoop Dogg produces most of the songs, credited under the alias Niggaracci. The first single is "Hat 2 Tha Bacc" by Westurn Union. The Big Squeeze debuted at #71 on the Billboard 200 Chart and #5 on the Rap Albums Chart. Being a Koch release, it also peaked at the Top Independent Albums Chart on the 4th spot. As a compilation, it scored the third position on the related chart.

== Track listing ==
No.	Title	Producer(s)	Length
1.	"The Big Squeeze Intro" (Snoop Dogg)	Niggaracci	2:19
2.	"Hat 2 tha Bacc" (Western Union and Snoop Dogg)	Niggaracci	3:56
3.	"We Came to Bang Out" (Tha Dogg Pound, Soopafly and Snoop Dogg)	Soopafly	3:43
4.	"Shackled Up" (The Warzone)	Niggaracci	3:55
5.	"Pop Pop Bang!" (Kurupt, Kam and Snoop Dogg)	Niggaracci	3:44
6.	"31 Flavaz" (Kurupt featuring Snoop Dogg)	Niggaracci	4:21
7.	"All About Damani" (Damani and Snoop Dogg)	Niggaracci	3:04
8.	"Like Rock Stars" (Bad Lucc, Damani, JT the Bigga Figga, Uncle Chucc and Snoop Dogg)	Niggaracci	5:03
9.	"Spend Some Time" (Ricky Harris, Uncle Chucc, Kurupt, Soopafly and Snoop Dogg)	Niggaracci	4:52
10.	"Fuckin' Is Good for You" (Damani, JT the Bigga Figga, Kurupt, Soopafly and Snoop Dogg)	Niggaracci	4:35
11.	"Get Your Body Moving" (MC Eiht, Kam and Uncle Chucc)	Niggaracci	4:06
12.	"Get Closer" (Azuré and Snoop Dogg)	Niggaracci	4:09
13.	"Can U Get Away?" (Goldie Loc and Ray J)	David Banner	3:47
14.	"Let's Get This Party Started" (Azuré and Snoop Dogg)	Niggaracci	3:18
15.	"Be Thankful" (Terrace Martin, J. Black and Uncle Chucc)	Terrace Martin	5:35
Total length:			1:00:27

Bonus tracks
No.	Title	Length
16.	"U In Trouble" (Kurupt and Snoop Dogg)	3:48
17.	"Lean On Me" (JT the Bigga Figga)	3:38
18.	"We Go Hard" (Katt Williams, Soopafly, Kurupt and Snoop Dogg)	4:36

== Videos ==
- Westurn Union featuring Snoop Dogg - "Hat 2 Tha Bacc"
