= Snoop Dogg Presents Christmas in tha Dogg House =

Snoop Dogg Presents: Christmas In Tha Dogghouse

Compilation album by Snoop Dogg
- Released: December 16, 2008
- Recorded: 2008
- Genres: West Coast hip-hop; G-funk; gangsta rap
- Length: 68:38
- Label: Doggystyle

Snoop Dogg chronology
Ego Trippin' (2008)	Christmas in Tha Dogg House (2008)	Landy & Egg Nog : A DPG Christmas (2008)

Snoop Dogg Presents Christmas in Tha Dogg House is a compilation album by American rapper Snoop Dogg. The album was released on December 16, 2008. The album is sold digitally only.

== Track listing ==
No.	Title	Artist	Length
1.	"Christmas Intro"	Snoop Dogg	2:51
2.	"Xmas on Soul"	J. Black featuring Snoop Dogg	4:04
3.	"This Christmas"	Tha Dogg Pound featuring Chris Starr of CSP Music Group	2:50
4.	"A Gift That Keeps on Giving"	Damani Nkosi featuring Chris Starr	3:00
5.	"A New Xmas"	Hustle Boyz featuring Uncle Chucc of 1500 or Nothin'	3:21
6.	"I Miss Them Days"	Soopafly	3:20
7.	"A Very Special Christmas"	Uncle Chucc	3:20
8.	"Twas the Night Before Xmas"	Damani Nkosi featuring Snoop Dogg and Nate Dogg	2:54
9.	"My Little Mama Trippin on Xmas"	Bad Lucc	2:35
10.	"Just Like Xmas"	Lil' ½ Dead and Twinz	3:57
11.	"Look Out"	Snoop Dogg featuring Tha Dogg Pound and Nate Dogg	5:22
12.	"When Was Jesus Born?"	Lil Gee	2:52
13.	"Xmas Trees"	Kurupt featuring Chris Starr	2:15
14.	"Everyday Is Like Christmas to Me"	Damani Nkosi	2:37
15.	"Christmas in the Hood"	Daz Dillinger featuring Deacon	3:54
16.	"The Grinch"	Bad Lucc	3:30
17.	"It's Christmas Time"	Hustle Boyz featuring Chris Starr	4:11
18.	"Landy in My Egg Nog"	Bad Lucc featuring Soopafly	3:41
19.	"Christmas Outro"	Snoop Dogg	2:59
20.	"A Pimp's Christmas Song"	Snoop Dogg featuring Bishop Magic Juan and Jake the Flake of The Dayton Family	5:05
