= War Zone (group) =

North American rap supergroup

- Origin: Los Angeles, California, U.S.
- Genres: West Coast hip-hop
- Years active: 2006–present
- Labels: Doggystyle
- Members: MC Eiht; Kam; Goldie Loc

War Zone was a West coast rap supergroup consisting of Goldie Loc, MC Eiht, and Kam. They made their debut on Snoop Dogg's Tha Blue Carpet Treatment (2006); after being unable to find them deals as separate artists, Snoop Dogg suggested they become a group, and started production on their album. According to Goldie Loc, the group has recorded about 13 tracks for a debut album. However, after time passed without finding a distribution deal, the group's various members parted to work on separate projects.

== Features ==
- "Don't Stop" (from the Snoop Dogg album Tha Blue Carpet Treatment)
- "Shackled Up" (from the Snoop Dogg Presents The Big Squeeze)
- "Damn" (featuring Snoop Dogg)
