= The Lady of Rage =

American rapper (born 1968)

- Born: Robin Yvette Allen; February 6, 1968 (age 58); Farmville, Virginia, U.S.
- Origin: Los Angeles, California, U.S.
- Genre: Hip hop
- Occupations: Rapper; actress; singer
- Years active: 1988–present
- Labels: Death Row; Interscope; Boss Lady; Doggy Style

Robin Yvette Allen (born February 6, 1968), known professionally as The Lady of Rage, is an American rapper, singer and actress known for her collaborations with several other Death Row Records artists, including Dr. Dre and Snoop Dogg on the albums The Chronic and Doggystyle. The Lady of Rage has been described as "one of the most skillful female MCs" with a "mastery of flow" and "hard-core lyrics".

== Biography ==
In the summer of 1988, the Lady of Rage was 20 years old when she met Shahkim, now known as Black Rushn of the Original Outlaw Brothers, a rap group from Queens. Once Shahkim convinced the Lady of Rage that he could get her a record deal, he brought her into his group. The members of the Outlaw Brothers made Rage a member of the group, and they eventually signed to a production deal with the L.A. Posse (who went on to produce several big hits for LL Cool J). At the time, the L.A. Posse had several artists within their group including, MC Wind, and the Real Roxanne. The L.A. Posse also had several relationships with different labels. Rage, along with all of the artists in the camp worked diligently writing and recording out of Chung King Studios in lower Manhattan. In 1991, the Lady of Rage met with Chubb Rock, providing vocals for the track "Bring Em Home Safe" on his album The One, which she recorded under the name of 'Rockin’ Robin'.

Dr. Dre discovered the Lady of Rage after hearing the vocals she recorded for the L.A. Posse's album, They Come in All Colors (1991). She later appeared on several tracks on Dr. Dre's 1992 album The Chronic, and on Snoop Dogg's Doggystyle in 1993.

On July 26, 1994, the Lady of Rage released the hit single "Afro Puffs" (from the soundtrack to Above the Rim) which reached No. 5 on the Billboard Hot Rap Singles chart. She also made an appearance on Tha Dogg Pound's album Dogg Food on the track "Do What I Feel". Though she had made more than a dozen appearances on soundtracks as well as albums from her Death Row Records cohorts, the Lady of Rage didn't release her debut album until 1997. Her debut solo album, Necessary Roughness, was released in June 1997 and peaked at No. 7 on the Billboard R&B Album chart and 32 on the Billboard 200 Albums chart. Her solo album was originally called Eargasm, but it was continually pushed back - the album was meant to have been the next album on Death Row Records after The Chronic, and then after Doggystyle, before finally being released in 1997.

After the release of her album and a guest-appearance with Gang Starr alongside Kurupt ("You Know My Steez (Three Men and a Lady Remix)") in 1998, Rage left Death Row Records and the music industry to focus on acting, appearing in an episode of Kenan & Kel. The Lady of Rage then went on to be featured in the sitcom The Steve Harvey Show on The WB as Coretta Cox, a recurring role she played from 1997 to 2000. She also had a role in Next Friday as Baby D, the sister of Day Day's ex-girlfriend.

From 2000 to 2002, she made three appearances on songs by Snoop Dogg: "Set It Off" from his album Tha Last Meal (2000), a solo track, "Unfucwitable", on Snoop Dogg Presents...Doggy Style Allstars Vol. 1 (2002), and "Batman & Robin", from his album Paid tha Cost to Be da Boss (2002).

In 2007, Rage signed to Shante Broadus' label, Boss Lady Entertainment, and recorded a mixtape called, From VA 2 LA. She also made appearances on Bigg Snoop Dogg Presents… Welcome to tha Chuuch: Da Album (2005) and Cali Iz Active (2006) in the song "Keep it Gangsta".

In 2008, Rage was a part of the FEM (Females Earning Money) Movement along with fellow female rappers Babs (of Da Band), Lady Luck, and Amil. In 2008, she performed with MC Lyte, Yo-Yo, and Salt-N-Pepa at the BET Hip Hop Awards. In the summer of 2010 she joined Snoop Dogg during his headlining set at the Rock the Bells festival concert series, along with Warren G, RBX, and Tha Dogg Pound for a performance of the Doggystyle album in its entirety.

In 2011, Rage was part of the group N'Matez, along with Daz Dillinger, Kurupt, and RBX. They released the track "Trajical".

Rage signed on to play herself in Dogg Pound 4 Life, a biographical film focusing on the rise of the 1990s rap group, Tha Dogg Pound and was pictured in an Instagram post with Daz Dillinger.

Rage also made an appearance on MC Eiht's 2017 album Which Way Iz West on the track "Heart Cold".

In May 2024, Tha Dogg Pound released their 9th studio album W.A.W.G. (We All We Got) with Rage appearing on track 9 "Who Da Hardest?" along with Snoop Dogg and RBX.

== Discography ==
=== Studio albums ===
- Necessary Roughness (1997)

=== Mixtapes ===
- VA to LA (2006)

=== Singles ===
- "Afro Puffs" (1994)

== Filmography ==
=== Film ===
List of film credits
Year	Title	Role	Notes
1998	Ride	Peaches	
2000	Next Friday	Baby D'	
2001	Thug Life	Ami	
2005	Confessions of a Thug	Seventy-Five	
2011	The Cookout 2	Litter Control Officer Watkins	TV movie
2018	Thriller	Emma Page	
2021	Judas and the Black Messiah	Lady Panther	
2024	Miss Cleo: Her Rise and Fall	Youree "Miss Cleo" Harris	TV movie

=== Television ===
List of television credits
Year	Title	Role	Notes
1994	Soul Train	Herself	Episode: "Tony! Toni! Toné!/Jonathan Butler/The Lady of Rage"
1997–2001	The Steve Harvey Show	Coretta "The Ox" Cox	Recurring cast: season 2–4, guest: season 5
1999	Kenan & Kel	Yovanda	Episode: "Three Girls, a Guy and a Cineplex"
2015	On Ten	Phyliss	Episode: "Pilot"
2016	Celebrity Family Feud	Herself	Episode: "Snoop Dogg vs. Sugar Ray Leonard/Laila Ali vs. George Hamilton"
2016	Unsung	Herself	Episode: "Kurupt"
2017	Who Killed Tupac?	Herself	Episode: "East Coast Vs. West Coast" & "Devil in a Red Suit"
2024	The Equalizer	Bianca Silva	Episode: "The Fight For Life"

=== Documentary ===
List of documentary film credits
Year	Title	Role
2000	Straight from the Streets	Herself
2010	My Mic Sounds Nice: A Truth About Women and Hip Hop	Herself
2010	Mics on Fire	Herself
