= Dubb Union =

G-funk group

- Origin: Los Angeles, California
- Genres: Hip hop; West Coast hip hop; gangsta rap; G-funk
- Years active: 2006–present
- Label: Koch
- Members: Bad Lucc; Damani; Soopafly
- Website: http://www.myspace.com/westurnunion

Dubb Union is a hip hop group featuring artists from Los Angeles and the nearby areas of Inglewood, Long Beach, and Watts.

The original name of the group was Westurn Union, but was later changed to Dubb Union to avoid a lawsuit with banking company Western Union.

The members of Dubb Union include Soopafly (Priest Brooks), Damani (Damani Washington), and Bad Lucc (Terence Harden).

Their first major label appearance was on the song "Like This" from Snoop Dogg's 2006 album Tha Blue Carpet Treatment.

Their street album titled House Shoe Muzik, Vol. 1 will be hosted by DJ Crazy Toones and is set to release in April 2008. The production was handled by Soopafly and features the single "All Night" as well as "Cali Grown". The official Westurn Union album was released on September 8, 2008 through Doggystyle/Koch.

Bad Lucc has started achieving success as a solo artist. He was featured on German rapper Problem's 2012 single "Like Whaaat", which was originally taken from Problem's mixtape Welcome to Mollywood 2, and peaked at #20 on the Bubbling Under Hot 100 Singles chart, making both artists' most successful single to date. He has also frequently collaborated with Problem, his group The HBK Gang and their founder Iamsu!.

== Discography ==
=== Albums ===
- Snoop Dogg Presents: Dubb Union (2008)

=== Appear On ===
- "I Don't Think So" from the Untitled Westurn Union project (2007)
- "Like This" from Snoop Dogg's Tha Blue Carpet Treatment (2006)
- "Hat 2 Bac", "Killaz", and "Rockstar" from Snoop Dogg presents : The Big Squeeze (2007)
- "Cali Grown" from the Untitled Westurn Union Project (2007)

=== Mixtapes ===
- DJ Clue presents Jackin 4 DJ's, Vol.1
- DJ Whoo Kid presents Jackin' 4 DJ's, Vol. 2
- House Shoe Musik, Vol. 1

=== Member Discography ===
==== Damani ====
Appears on

- "Hate On Me”" from Kurupt's Space Boogie: Smoke Oddessey (2001)
- "The Way We Carry On" from Leroy's Leroy (2001)
- "Competition", "Diva", and "I Like Your Style" from Hair Show Soundtrack (2004)
- "California Christmas (Remix)" from Mary Mary's A Mary Mary Christmas (2006)
- "The Wait Is Over (Remix)" featuring WC from the CT Experience by DJ Crazy Toones (2006)

Mixtapes

- Damani - The Street Album (2002)
- DJ Reflex & DJ Skee Present Damani - Congratulations Playa (2006)
- Damani - Adidas Presents Congratulations Player (2009)

==== Bad Lucc ====
- "Watch That Girl" from My Baby's Daddy Soundtrack (2004)
- "Have U Ever Seen" (featuring Scan, 2 a.k.a. Toussaint & LeMarvin)
- "City Life" (featuring Toussaint)
- "Grind"
- "Let It Got" (Produced By Ric Rude)
- "New Age Pimpin'" (NV featuring Bad Lucc)
- "Where you from" (from the CT Experience by DJ Crazy Toones)
- "This Ain't One of Them Songs"
- "L.A., L.A." (Lady Rhapsody featuring Bad Lucc and Cool-ade)
- "Welcome II L.A." (Bangstar All-Stars)
- "Shake Ya Body" (Remy Rantovan featuring Cool Ade and Bad Lucc)
- "The East Side" (Young Maylay featuring Bad Lucc from The Real Coast Guard)
- 2012: "Rollin'" (Problem featuring Bad Lucc) from Welcome To Mollywood
- 2012: "Foolies" (Problem featuring Skeme & Bad Lucc) from Welcome to Mollywood
- 2012: "R You a Freak" (Problem featuring Bad Lucc) from Welcome to Mollywood
- 2012: "Like Whaaaaat" (Problem featuring Bad Lucc) RT40 #40 from Welcome To Mollywood 2
- 2012: "Faster" (Problem featuring Bad Lucc & Skeme) from Welcome To Mollywood 2
- 2012: "Jumpin" (Problem featuring Bad Lucc) from Welcome To Mollywood 2
- 2012: "Nasty" (Problem featuring Bad Lucc & E-40) from Welcome To Mollywood 2
- 2012: "D2B" (Problem featuring Bad Lucc & The Homegirl) from Welcome To Mollywood 2
- 2013: "Twerk" (Problem featuring Bad Lucc)
- 2013: "Some More Ones" (Problem & Iamsu! featuring Bad Lucc & Kool John) from Million Dollar Afro
- 2013: "I Get B****es" (Problem & Iamsu! featuring Bad Lucc & P-Lo) from Million Dollar Afro
- 2013: "Bang Bang" (Problem featuring Bad Lucc & Game) from The Separation
- 2013: "Made a Mil Before the Summer" (Problem featuring Bad Lucc & Kent) from The Separation
- 2013: "Already" (Problem featuring Bad Lucc) from The Separation
- 2013: "2DaSide" (League of Starz featuring Problem & Bad Lucc) from LOS.FM
- 2013: "Show Sumn" (League of Starz featuring Problem, Skeme, Freddie Gibbs, Jay Rock, G Malone & Bad Lucc)
- 2013: "Beast" (League of Starz featuring Bad Lucc & Problem) from LOS.FM

Mixtapes

- DJ Age Presents Bad Lucc - The Watt's Riot
