= Snoop Dogg Presents... Doggy Style Allstars Vol. 1 =

Snoop Dogg Presents... Doggy Style Allstars, Welcome to tha House Vol. 1

Compilation album by Doggystyle Records
- Released: August 13, 2002
- Recorded: 2002
- Genre: West Coast hip hop, G-funk, gangsta rap
- Length: 1:18:33
- Label: Doggystyle
- Producer: Snoop Dogg (exec.)

Snoop Dogg Presents... Doggy Style Allstars, Welcome To Tha House Vol. 1 is a compilation presented by American rapper Snoop Dogg. It was released on August 13, 2002, by Snoop Dogg's own label, Doggystyle Records. The album features production by DJ Premier, Quazedelic, Fredwreck, Meech Wells, The Alchemist, Hi-Tek, and DJ Slip; it was regionally promoted by Radio Bums. It peaked at number 8 on the Billboard Top R&B/Hip-Hop Albums and at number 19 on the Billboard 200. The album features performances by Snoop Dogg, Kokane, RBX, Daz Dillinger, Soopafly, Nate Dogg and The Lady of Rage.

A DVD titled Snoop Dogg - Welcome to the House: The Doggumentary, featuring music videos for the tracks "Fallen Star" and "Not Like it Was", was released as promotional material for the album.

== Reception ==
Professional ratings
Review scores
Source	Rating
Allmusic	2/5 stars
RapReviews	6/10 stars
Rolling Stone	3/5 stars

Chart - "Leave it to Snoop to deliver a bumpin' P-Funk beat. In Tha House Vol. 1 is the audio equivalent of his Doggy Style porn series and Hollywood comedies — no convoluted themes, just the down-ass dirty shit that keeps people coming back for more. ... There are no clear highlights, just a steady, slow-burning dose of funky cheeba."

== Track listing ==
No.	Title	Producer(s)	Length
1.	"Intro" (Mac Minister and Snoop Dogg)	Quazedelic	0:41
2.	"Dogg House America" (Snoop Dogg, Soopafly, E. White, Mr. Kane and Latoya Williams)	Quazedelic	5:00
3.	"Not Like It Was" (Soopafly, Snoop Dogg, E. White and RBX)	Ez Elpee	2:59
4.	"Fallen Star" (Latoya Williams)	Michael Angelo	3:05
5.	"Doh' Doh'" (Snoop Dogg, Soopafly, E. White and Mr. Kane)	Hi-Tek	4:01
6.	"Doin' It Bigg" (RBX and E. White)	Hi-Tek	3:48
7.	"Nite L.O.C.s" (Mr. Kane and Snoop Dogg)	Quazedelic, Meech Wells	3:33
8.	"Are You Ready!?" (Soopafly)	Hi-Tek	2:42
9.	"Hey You" (Snoop Dogg, Soopafly and E. White)	The Alchemist	4:36
10.	"Raised On tha Side" (Soopafly, E. White, Snoop Dogg, Mr. Kane and Daz Dillinger)	Fredwreck	4:00
11.	"Don't Fight the Feelin'" (Snoop Dogg, Nate Dogg, Cam'ron, Lady May and Soopafly)	Quazedelic, Meech Wells	4:30
12.	"Unfucwitable" (The Lady of Rage)	DJ Premier	3:42
13.	"The Strong Will Eat the Weak" (RBX, Mr. Kane and Snoop Dogg)	Ervin EP Pope	3:54
14.	"Just Get Carried Away" (Reo Varnado, Snoop Dogg and Vinnie Bernard)	DJ Scratch	4:32
15.	"It Feelz Good" (Latoya Williams)	Soopafly	5:32
16.	"Don't Make a Wrong Move" (Mr. Kane, Special Ed, Snoop Dogg and Prodigy)	Nottz	3:59
17.	"Bitch's Treat" (Soopafly and Latoya Williams)	Soopafly	3:46
18.	"Trouble" (Vinnie Bernard)	Vinnie Bernard	4:56
19.	"Squeeze Play" (IV Life Family and Snoop Dogg)	DJ Slip	4:52
20.	"Light That Shit Up" (Soopafly, Snoop Dogg, RBX and Mr. Kane)	Hi-Tek	4:12
Total length:			1:18:33

== Samples ==
- "Dogg House America"
  - "Oh I" by George Clinton and the Funkadelics
- "Hey You!"
  - "What's Your Name?" by The Moments
- "I Just Get Carried Away"
  - "Do I Stand a Chance" by The Montclairs
- "Endo… Light That Shit Up"
  - "I Need a Bitch" by Nate Dogg (unreleased, later included on Nate Dogg)
- "Not Like It Was"
  - "Telling It Like It Is" by T.U.M.E.

== Chart history ==
Chart (2002)	Peak position
Swiss Albums (Schweizer Hitparade)	72
US Billboard 200	19
US Top R&B/Hip-Hop Albums (Billboard)	8
