= Dead Man Walkin' (Snoop Dogg album) =

Dead Man Walkin

Compilation album by Snoop Dogg
- Released: October 31, 2000
- Recorded: 1993–1997
- Genres: West Coast hip-hop; gangsta rap; G-funk
- Length: 59:38
- Labels: Death Row; D3
- Producers: Suge Knight (exec.); Cold 187um; Daz Dillinger; DJ Pooh; Kurt "Kobane" Couthon; L.T. Hutton; Snoop Dogg; Soopafly; Myrion

Snoop Dogg chronology
No Limit Top Dogg (1999)	Dead Man Walkin (2000)	Tha Last Meal (2000)

Dead Man Walkin is a compilation album released by Death Row Records on October 31, 2000, composed of archived Snoop Dogg recordings. The album was not authorized by Snoop Dogg, nor recognized on the discography on his website. Snoop Dogg was an artist on Death Row from 1991 to 1998, when he left the label following labelmate Dr. Dre's departure and the death of 2Pac. The split between Snoop Dogg and Death Row head Suge Knight was less than amicable, and the title of this release was an unfriendly warning from Knight to Snoop Dogg, who had spoken out against the imposing Knight in several interviews and on record as well. Despite Dead Man Walkin not being authorized by Snoop Dogg, he now owns the rights to the album due to his acquisition of Death Row Records in 2022.

== Music ==
Professional ratings
Review scores
Source	Rating
AllMusic	2.5/5 stars
RapReviews	7/10
The New Rolling Stone Album Guide	2/5 stars

A music video was released for "Head Doctor". The song, "Change Gone Come" which features vocals from Val Young first appeared on the 1998 Snoop Dogg compilation album, SmokeFest World Tour. The song also appeared on the 1999 compilation album, Well Connected, from Swerve Records.

== Track listing ==
No.	Title	Writer(s)	Producer(s)	Length
1.	"May I" (featuring Lil Malik)	Calvin Broadus; LaMorris Edwards; Priest Joseph Brooks	Soopafly	3:54
2.	"C-Walkin'"	Broadus; Gregory Hutchinson	Big Hutch; Myrion (co.)	4:52
3.	"Head Doctor" (featuring Swoop G and Raphael Saadiq)	Broadus; James Parker; Kurt Couthon	Kurt "Kobane" Couthon	4:21
4.	"Hit Rocks"	Broadus; Mark Jordan	DJ Pooh; Snoop Dogg	5:48
5.	"Tommy Boy" (featuring Dat Nigga Daz)	Broadus; Delmar Arnaud	Dat Nigga Daz	5:05
6.	"Change Gone Come" (featuring Val Young)	Broadus; Lenton Tereill Hutton; Priest; Garry Marshall Shider; Garrett Clinton Shider; Barbarella Bishop; Ronald Ford	L.T. Hutton; Soopafly; Snoop Dogg	5:43
7.	"Too Black"	Broadus; Hutton	L.T. Hutton; Snoop Dogg	5:16
8.	"Gangsta Walk" (featuring Tha Dogg Pound)	Broadus; Arnaud; Ricardo Brown	Daz Dillinger	5:22
9.	"County Blues" (featuring Kevin Vernado)	Broadus; Kevin Vernado; Arnaud	Daz Dillinger; Big Hutch	5:10
10.	"I Will Survive" (featuring Techniec and Kurupt)	Broadus; Brown; Brooks	Soopafly	4:46
11.	"My Favorite Color" (featuring Big Hutch)	Broadus; Hutchinson; Myrion	Big Hutch; Myrion (co.)	5:18
12.	"Me and My Doggs" (featuring Techniec)	Broadus; Hutton	L.T. Hutton; Snoop Dogg	4:02
Total length:				59:38

== Charts ==
Chart (2000–01)	Peak position
Canada Top 50	41
New Zealand Albums (RMNZ)	48
US Billboard 200	24
US Top R&B/Hip-Hop Albums (Billboard)	11
US Independent Albums (Billboard)	2

== Sales ==
Region	Certification	Certified units/sales
United States	—	220,478
