= L.T. Hutton =

- Birth name: Lenton Terrell Hutton
- Born: January 6, 1974 (age 51); Chicago Heights, Illinois, U.S.
- Genres: Hip-hop, R&B
- Occupations: Record producer; film producer; entrepreneur
- Years active: 1995–present
- Labels: The Program

Lenton Terrell Hutton (born January 6, 1974) is an American record producer and entrepreneur

== Career ==
Hutton has worked on several projects with Death Row Records, and became the head of A&R at Ruthless Records, Interscope Records. Starting out working on Death Row projects, he branched off on his own to work with Lost Boyz, Lloyd, Immature, B2K, Daz, Snoop Dogg, Soopafly, Mariah Carey, Ray J, Da Brat, MC Ren and Eazy-E. Hutton has songs in films including A Thin Line Between Love and Hate featuring Martin Lawrence, Lynn Whitfield, and Regina King and Juwanna Mann featuring Miguel A. Núñez Jr., Vivica A. Fox, Kevin Pollak and Tommy Davidson. His productions appear on rapper 2Pac's album, Pac's Life, and he did production for BTNHResurrection and Thug World Order for the rap group, Bone Thugs-n-Harmony. He worked with Ashanti on her fourth studio album The Declaration, which was released in early 2008. He co-owns an indie record label "The Program" with former NBA player Elton Brand. With Morgan Creek Productions, Hutton co-produced the Tupac Shakur biopic All Eyez on Me. The film was released in North American theaters on June 16, 2017, on what would have been Shakur's 46th birthday.
