= Battlecat (music producer) =

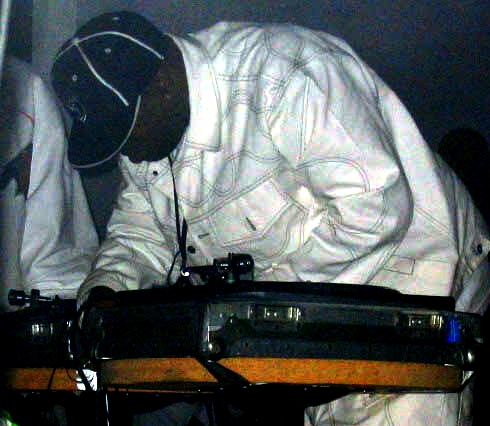
- Battlecat at the 1580 AM KDAY 20th anniversary event in 2003

Background information
- Also known as: DJ Battlecat; B Sharp
- Born: Kevin Gilliam; April 20, 1968 (age 58)
- Origin: South Central Los Angeles, California, U.S.
- Genres: Hip-hop
- Occupations: Record producer; DJ; rapper; songwriter; singer
- Instruments: Sampler; keyboard; drums; vocoder; synthesizer
- Years active: 1988–present
- Labels: Maverick; Warner Bros.; B.C. Pow'Da Entertainment, Inc.; Future Sound Entertainment

Kevin Gilliam (born April 20, 1968), better known by his stage name Battlecat or DJ Battlecat, is an American hip hop record producer and DJ from South Los Angeles, California.

== Biography ==
He started out as a battle DJ, notably competing in the 1988 New Music Seminar DJ Battle for World Supremacy and the 1990 DMC US Mixing Finals, both in NYC. He is well known for producing artists such as Snoop Dogg, Tupac Shakur, Nate Dogg, The Game, Xzibit and Tha Eastsidaz, along with a number of other West Coast rappers and artists. Battlecat has also produced a number of noted R&B artists, including Faith Evans, Brian McKnight, Tyrese and Jon B..

His aesthetic is a progression from the early-'90s G-Funk sound pioneered by Above the Law and Dr. Dre, characterized by fat synth bass lines and soulful keys, as well as the occasional use of a vocoder/talk box revolutionized by the late Roger Troutman. He is also the concert DJ for Snoop Dogg. As a youth, he was a member of the Neighborhood Rollin 60s crip; because of this, he has also produced instrumentals for the 1993 album Bangin' on Wax by rap collaboration Bloods & Crips.

In 2009, Battlecat produced a special song titled "A Soldier Never Dies", dedicated to fallen U.S. marine Anthony Vargas. Battlecat is a DJ member of the worldwide DJ organization The Core DJs. The music video was directed by Paolo Ongkeko and produced by Don Le. One of the video's leads was portrayed by Sonny Ayon.

== Discography ==
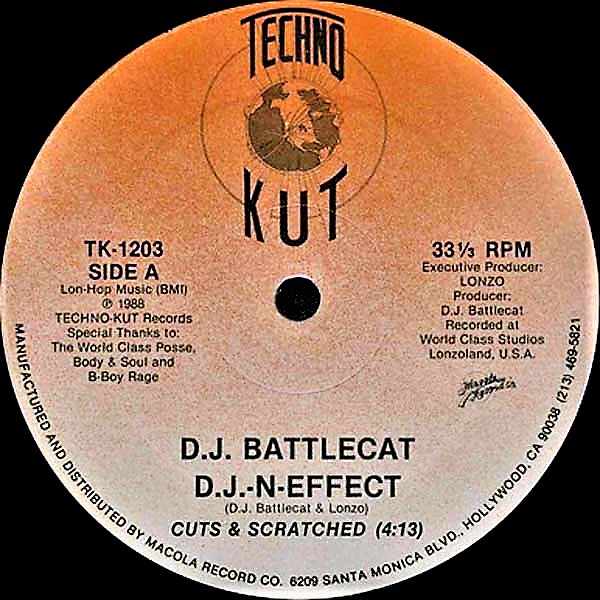
Battlecat produced and released his first record "D.J. N-Effect" in 1988

- 1988: DJ-N-Effect
- 1999: Gumbo Roots
- 2009: G' & Sexy Vol. 1 (with Amplified)
- 2013: South Central Funktion
- 2026: Tales from My Hood (with Kurupt)
