= Tha Eastsidaz =

American hip hop trio

- Origin: Long Beach, California, U.S.
- Genres: West Coast hip hop; gangsta rap; G-funk
- Years active: 1997; 1999–2003; 2014–2016; 2022–present
- Labels: TVT; Doggy Style; Death Row
- Members: Goldie Loc; Tray Deee; Snoop Dogg

Tha Eastsidaz is a hip hop trio consisting of Tray Deee, Goldie Loc, and Snoop Dogg. Their first appearance was on Tommy Boy Records Ride soundtrack with Crooked Eye Q on a Battlecat-produced song called "Feels So Good" in 1997.

== History ==
=== Emergence (1997–2003) ===
The band originates from Long Beach, California. In 1997, after Snoop Dogg left Death Row records, he formed 'The Eastsiders' with Crooked I, Techniec, and Lil' C-Style. They released one song commercially 'Feels So Good' on the soundtrack for the 1998 film Ride. The group was briefly under contract with Virgin records, however no other songs were released besides a few other songs that were leaked onto the internet in 1999.

It took another two years for the revival of the ensemble and they formed again in 1999, with a new line-up made up of Goldie Loc, Tray Deee, and Snoop Dogg. The name was also changed to 'Tha Eastsidaz', possibly due to contractual obligations with Virgin Records. After signing on to Snoop's Doggystyle Records, distributed by TVT, they released their debut album, Snoop Dogg Presents Tha Eastsidaz; which was a hit and eventually went platinum. They were also featured on "Lay Low," a hit single from Snoop Dogg's album Tha Last Meal and the soundtrack to the horror film Bones, which starred Snoop as the title character. The next year, they released their second album, Duces 'n Trayz: The Old Fashioned Way. The album was critically well-received, but only certified gold.

=== Breakup (2003–2014) ===
By late 2003, Tray Deee had a falling out with Snoop Dogg. In an interview with AllHipHop shortly before his arrest, he alleged that Snoop Dogg and TVT financially mismanaged the group, claiming that despite platinum and gold album sales, he and Goldie Loc received only a fraction of their earnings—about $40,000 from the first album and a $200,000 advance from the second. Tray Deee also stated that Snoop gave them platinum Doggy Style chains as partial payment. He described efforts to resolve the dispute diplomatically, which he claimed were ignored, and alleged an incident in which Snoop’s security fired at him when he attempted to collect owed money. Tray Deee asserted that he and Goldie Loc were each owed over $1 million. In a 2004 interview with DubCNN, Goldie Loc addressed a track in which he rapped over Snoop Dogg’s “Doggy Dogg World” instrumental, taking aim at Snoop. He clarified that the recording was a mixtape track rather than an official release and described it as commentary on interpersonal and cultural dynamics within his circle rather than a personal attack. Goldie Loc characterized his comments as constructive criticism directed at Snoop Dogg’s associations and stated that the two maintained a close working relationship, referring to Snoop as a “homie” despite occasional disagreements and tensions. However, in 2005, Goldie Loc and Snoop Dogg reunited to form Tha Eastsidaz; they released a new joint album with the IV Life Family. Goldie Loc was also involved in The Warzone with MC Eiht and Kam. In 2009, while serving time, Tray Deee spoke with Snoop Dogg during a ten-minute phone call, during which they resolved their personal tensions despite lingering disagreements over financial matters. However, Tray Deee declared that he would never collaborate with Goldie Loc again, citing Goldie Loc’s alignment with Snoop during disputes over financial mismanagement. Tray Deee had attempted to unite with Goldie Loc to address the issues collectively, but Goldie Loc sided with Snoop, portraying Tray Deee as the sole source of conflict. As a result, a full Eastsidaz reunion remained impossible at the time.

The group also appeared in two films. They were featured in the 2001 film Baby Boy and their self-titled direct-to-video crime film, which was a success in retail sales despite the extremely low-budget production thus was certified double platinum.

=== Reunion (2014–2016) ===
On April 3, 2014, Tray Deee was released from California Men's Colony, where he had been incarcerated since 2005 on attempted murder charges. On April 18 and 19, Tray Deee and Goldie Loc will reunite as Tha Eastsidaz to perform at "Krush Groove 2014" at Save Mart Center in Fresno, California and The Forum in Inglewood. Tray Deee has stated that it is unlikely that there will ever be another Eastsidaz album.

=== Second reunion (2022–present) ===
On February 4, 2022, Tray Deee announced new upcoming music from Tha Eastsidaz. On February 9, 2022, Goldie Loc confirmed a new Eastsidaz album. On October 25, 2024, the duo released Still Easty, a 7-track EP on Death Row Records.

== Discography ==
Studio albums

- Tha Eastsidaz (2000)
- Duces 'n Trayz: The Old Fashioned Way (2001)

Extended plays

- Still Easty (2024)

== Filmography ==
- Tha Eastsidaz (2000)
- Baby Boy (2001)
- The Wash (2001)
- Crime Partners (2003)

== Awards ==
- Won at the 2000 Source Awards: New Artist of the Year, Group
