= Soopafly =

- Born: Priest Joseph Brooks; December 8, 1972 (age 53); Long Beach, California, U.S.
- Genres: West Coast hip hop
- Occupations: Record producer; rapper
- Instruments: Keyboards; sampler
- Years active: 1993–present
- Label: Doggy Style
- Member of: D.P.G.C.
- Website: www.myspace.com/soopaflydpgc

Priest Joseph Brooks (born December 8, 1972), known professionally as Soopafly, is an American hip hop producer and rapper from Long Beach, California. He is a member of the DPGC.

== Early life ==
The oldest of three children, Brooks grew up in Long Beach. He was given a keyboard by his father after being inspired by the piano players he saw in church.

=== Early career ===
During his teenage years, Brooks met rappers Snoop Dogg and Dr. Dre. Proving himself with his keyboard skills, Soopafly was assigned his first piece of work for Death Row Records on the soundtrack Murder Was The Case. He played keyboards for Dr. Dre and Ice Cube on the track "Natural Born Killaz" and for Jodeci on the track "Come Up To My Room", as well as his first production credit with "Who Got Some Gangsta Shit" featuring Snoop Dogg and Tha Dogg Pound. In 1995, he produced "Sooo Much Style" for Tha Dogg Pound on their debut album "Dogg Food". He also played the keyboards on eight other songs throughout. Then in 1996, he was featured on the soundtrack to the movie A Thin Line Between Love and Hate on the song "I Don't Hang." A remix would later follow.

Soopafly was further introduced to mainstream listeners on Snoop Dogg's second studio album Tha Doggfather. He produced the songs "Freestyle Conversation" and "You Thought", appearing alongside veteran rapper Too Short. Since then, he has been featured primarily on albums by local artists such as Snoop Dogg, Daz Dillinger, Kurupt, Warren G, RBX, Bad Azz and Tha Eastsidaz. To date, he has released three solo albums.

=== Westurn Union ===
In July 2006, the rap group called Westurn Union was formed. It features Soopafly, Damani and Bad Lucc. They made their first appearance on Snoop Dogg's album Tha Blue Carpet Treatment and released a street single titled "I Don't Think So", produced by Rick Rock. In April 2008, a mixtape was released titled House Shoe Musik, Vol. 1 and was hosted by DJ Crazy Toones. After inking a deal with Koch Records and Doggystyle Records, the official debut album Snoop Dogg Presents: Dubb Union was released on September 2, 2008. Prior to the release, the group and the labels were approached by the company Western Union, threatening legal action if the name was not changed. Though there is a difference between Westurn and Western, the labels did not want to spend money dealing with a lawsuit, the name of the group was changed to Dubb Union.

== Discography ==
Studio albums

- Dat Whoopty Woop (2001)
- Bangin West Coast (2007)
- Best Kept Secret (2011)
