= Tha Eastsidaz discography =

- Studio albums: 2
- Extended plays: 1
- Mixtapes: 1
- Singles: 3

The discography of American rap duo Tha Eastsidaz contains two studio albums, one extended play, one mixtape, three singles and several guest appearances.

== Albums ==
=== Studio albums ===
List of studio albums, with selected chart positions, sales and certifications
Title	Album details	Peak chart positions						Sales	Certifications
Title	Album details	US	US R&B/HH	AUS	CAN	NZ	UK R&B	Sales	Certifications
Tha Eastsidaz	Released: February 1, 2000; Label: Dogghouse, TVT; Format: CD, LP, cassette, digital download	8	5	27	8	15	32	US: 1,000,000	RIAA: Platinum; MC: Gold
Duces 'n Trayz: The Old Fashioned Way	Released: July 31, 2001; Label: Doggy Style, TVT; Format: CD, LP, cassette, digital download	4	2	54	15	—	—	US: 839,000	RIAA: Gold; MC: Gold
"—" denotes a recording that did not chart or was not released in that territory.

== Extended plays ==
Title	EP details
Still Easty	Released: October 25, 2024; Label: Death Row, Gamma; Format: Digital download

== Mixtapes ==
Title	Mixtape details
That's My Work 4	Released: September 16, 2016; Label: Self-released; Format: Digital download; Host: DJ Drama & Snoop Dogg

== Singles ==
=== As lead artist ===
List of singles as lead artist, with selected chart positions and certifications, showing year released and album name
Title	Year	Peak chart positions					Certifications	Album
Title	Year	US	US R&B/HH	US Rap	AUS	CAN	Certifications	Album
"G'd Up"	1999	47	19	2	—	13		Tha Eastsidaz
"Got Beef"	2000	99	55	38	23	—		Tha Eastsidaz
"I Luv It"	2001	—	57	—	—	—		Duces 'n Trayz: The Old Fashioned Way
"—" denotes a recording that did not chart or was not released in that territory.

=== As featured artist ===
List of singles as lead artist, with selected chart positions and certifications, showing year released and album name
Title	Year	Peak chart positions						Album
Title	Year	US	US R&B	FRA	GER	NL	SWI	Album
"Lay Low" (Snoop Dogg featuring Master P, Nate Dogg, Butch Cassidy and Tha Eastsidaz)	2001	50	8	81	49	33	48	Tha Last Meal
"—" denotes a recording that did not chart or was not released in that territory.

== Other charted songs ==
List of songs, with selected chart positions, showing year released and album name
Title	Year	Peak chart positions	Album
Title	Year	US R&B	Album
"Feels So Good"	1998	— (Note: "Feels So Good" did not enter the Billboard Hot R&B/Hip-Hop Songs, but peaked at number 6 on the Bubbling Under R&B/Hip-Hop chart, which acts as an extension to the Hot R&B/Hip-Hop Songs.)	Ride (soundtrack)

== Guest appearances ==
List of non-single guest appearances, with other performing artists, showing year released and album name
Title	Year	Other artist(s)	Album
"Feels So Good"	1998	—N/a	Ride (soundtrack)
"Concrete Jungle"	2000	C-Murder and Kokane	Trapped in Crime
"Game to Get Over"	2000	Doggy's Angels	Pleezbaleevit!
"Lay Low"	2000	Snoop Dogg, Master P, Nate Dogg, Butch Cassidy	Tha Last Meal
"If You Came Here to Party"	2001	Kola	Bones (soundtrack)
"This Is How We Eat"	2001	Too $hort, Kokane, Big Tigger	Chase the Cat
"Ditty Dum Ditty Doo"	2001	Nate Dogg	Music & Me
"Eastside Ryders"	2001	Styles P	Ryde or Die Vol. 3: In the "R" We Trust
"High Times (Ride With Us)"	2002	F.T.	Friday After Next (soundtrack)
"Live for Danger"	2003	Gangsta	Penitentiary Chances
"Gangbang Music"	2004	Spice 1	The Ridah
"They Ain't Fenta Take My Shit"	2004	Pomona City Rydaz, Suga Free	Walking Game
"Verbatum"	2009	Tha Chill	The Wind Chill Factor
"Muggin' Ain't Thuggin'"	2015	Paris (Note: Big Tray Deee and Goldie Loc credited collectively as Tha Eastsidaz.)	Pistol Politics
"Search Warrant"	2015	Paris, E-40, WC, Kam	Pistol Politics
"Fetty in the Bag"	2021	(Note: Credited individually as Big Tray Deee and Goldie Loc.)	From tha Streets 2 tha Suites
"Bad"	2022	—N/a	Snoop Dogg Presents Death Row Summer 2022
"We All We Got"	2024	Tha Dogg Pound	W.A.W.G. (We All We Got)
