= Bad Azz discography =

This is the discography of American rapper Bad Azz from Long Beach, California.

== Albums ==
=== Studio albums ===
List of studio albums, with selected chart positions
| Title | Release | Peak chart positions | |
| Title | Release | US | US R&B |
|---|---|---|---|
| Word on tha Streets | Released: September 29, 1998; Label: Priority Records | 182 | 32 |
| Personal Business | Released: July 17, 2001; Label: Doggystyle Records/Priority Records | 59 | 16 |
| Money Run | Released: March 11, 2003; Label: Out Of Bounds/Double Dollar Sign Records | — | 85 |
| Executive Decision | Released: 2004; Label: Liquid 8 Records/Enchanted Entertainment | — | — |

=== Collaborative albums ===
- Thug Pound (with Bizzy Bone) (2009)
- Haven't You Heard... (with LBC Crew) (2011)

=== Mixtapes ===
- I'm Baaack and I Ain't Went Nowhere (with DJ Age) (2010)
- I'm Baaack and I Ain't Went Nowhere 2 (with DJ Age) (2012)

== Singles ==
List of singles, with selected chart positions
| Year | Title | Peak chart positions | | Album |
| Year | Title | US R&B | US Rap | Album |
|---|---|---|---|---|
| 1999 | "We Be Puttin' It Down!" (featuring Snoop Dogg) | 62 | 8 | Word on tha Streets |
| 2001 | "Wrong Idea" (featuring Snoop Dogg, Kokane and Lil' ½ Dead) | 75 | — | Personal Business |
"—" denotes a recording that did not chart.

== Guest appearances ==
| Year | Song | Artist(s) | Album |
|---|---|---|---|
| 1996 | "Krazy" | 2Pac (featuring Bad Azz) | The Don Killuminati: The 7 Day Theory |
| 1996 | "Gold Rush" | Snoop Doggy Dogg (featuring Bad Azz, Techniec & Kurupt) | Tha Doggfather |
| 1996 | "Blueberry" | Snoop Doggy Dogg (featuring Bad Azz, Techniec, Daz Dillinger & Kurupt) | Tha Doggfather |
| 1996 | "Santa Claus Goes Straight to the Ghetto" | Various Artists (featuring Bad Azz, Nate Dogg, Tray Deee, Daz Dillinger & Snoop Doggy Dogg) | Christmas on Death Row |
| 1997 | "What We Go Through" | Warren G (featuring Mr. Malik, Perfec and Bad Azz) | Take a Look Over Your Shoulder |
| 1998 | "Gang Bangin' Ass Criminal" | Daz Dillinger (featuring Kurupt, Soopafly, Tray Deee, Bad Azz, Techniec) | Retaliation, Revenge and Get Back |
| 1998 | "The Ultimate Come Up" | Daz Dillinger (featuring MC Eiht, Bad Azz) | Retaliation, Revenge and Get Back |
| 1998 | "Thank God For My Life" | Daz Dillinger (featuring Bad Azz, Tray Dee, Soopafly, Big Pimpin' Delemond) | Retaliation, Revenge and Get Back |
| 1998 | "Flossin" | Various Artists (featuring Bad Azz, Tray Dee & Lil' C-Style) | 19th Street LBC Compilation |
| 1998 | "I Like To Roll" | Various Artists (featuring Bad Azz, Shorty K & Coco Loc) | 19th Street LBC Compilation |
| 1999 | "Rollin Wit Low Life" | Various Artists (featuring Bad Azz, Hit From The LBC, Young Life & Blaqthoven) | Escape From Death Row |
| 2000 | "Nigga 4 Life" | Tha Eastsidaz (featuring Bad Azz) | Tha Eastsidaz |
| 2000 | "Wrong Idea" | Snoop Dogg (featuring Bad Azz, Kokane & Lil Half Dead) | Tha Last Meal |
| 2000 | "20/20's" | Spice 1 (featuring Bad Azz) | The Last Dance |
| 2000 | "G.A.M.E." | Spice 1 (featuring Bad Azz, Michelob & 40 Glocc) | The Last Dance |
| 2000 | "Land Of The Kill" | Lil' Raw (featuring Bad Azz) | Livin' Raw |
| 2000 | "Killa Cali" | C-Lim (featuring Bad Azz & Big Syke) | What's Dat 'N' Like |
| 2000 | "You Ain't Hard" | Various Artists (featuring Bad Azz & Techniec) | WWF Aggression |
| 2000 | "One Time" | Brotha Lynch Hung (featuring Bad Azz) | EBK4 |
| 2001 | "Everyday" | Soopafly (featuring Bad Azz, Lil' C-Style & Tray Deee) | Dat Whoopty Woop |
| 2001 | "Why You Wanna Act This Way" | Soopafly (featuring Bad Azz) | Dat Whoopty Woop |
| 2001 | "Getting Paid In Cali" | Various Artists (featuring Bad Azz, Lil Jay & Sylk-E. Fyne) | West Next |
| 2001 | "World Keeps Spinnin" | Various Artists (featuring Bad Azz, Mr. Mash & B-Zerk) | West Next |
| 2001 | "Gang Bang 4 Real" | Tha Eastsidaz (featuring Bad Azz) | Duces 'n Trayz: The Old Fashioned Way |
| 2001 | "West Coast Plantation" | Bad Azz (featuring Xzibit) | Unreleased |
| 2001 | "Keep it Real" | Snoop Dogg (featuring Bad Azz, Techniec, Mack 10, Kurupt & Threat) | Death Row: Snoop Doggy Dogg at His Best |
| 2001 | "Death Of Snow White" | Various Artists (featuring Bad Azz, Chan, Coniyac & Snoop Dogg) | Bones |
| 2001 | "Only Move 4 The Money" | Makaveli (2Pac) & Daz Dillinger (featuring Bad Azz) | Makaveli & Dillinger Don't Go 2 Sleep |
| 2001 | "Street Life" | Livio (featuring Bad Azz & Daz Dillinger) | My Life Vol. 1 |
| 2001 | "Dangerous" | Mac Dre (featuring Bad Azz & Daz Dillinger) | Mac Dre's the Name |
| 2002 | "Lightz Out" | Young Noble (featuring Bad Azz, E.D.I. Mean, Lil Zane & Yukmouth) | Noble Justice |
| 2002 | "What Would You Do" | Daddy V (featuring Bad Azz & Lil Half Dead) | The Compton OG |
| 2002 | "Hustle And Focus" | Space Hog (featuring Bad Azz) | Vegas Hog Livin' |
| 2002 | "It Ain't My Fault" | Tha Dogg Pound (featuring Bad Azz) | The Last of Tha Pound |
| 2002 | "Clap Your Handz" | Tray Deee (featuring Bad Azz, Too Cool, Kokane & Young Bucc) | The General's List |
| 2002 | "Hard Timez On Planet Earth" | Tray Deee (featuring Bad Azz) | The General's List |
| 2002 | "Maxmillion" | Various Artists (featuring Bad Azz) | Bay 2 L.A.: West Side Bad Boys Vol. 2 |
| 2002 | "After Dark" | Warren G (featuring Snoop Dogg, Daz Dillinger, Kokane, Bad Azz & E White) | What We Do / After Dark |
| 2003 | "U Ain't Shit" | Daz Dillinger (featuring Bad Azz) | DPGC: U Know What I'm Throwin' Up |
| 2003 | "Thug Song" | Louie Loc (featuring Bad Azz & Young Noble) | Power Moves |
| 2003 | "Ballin" | Al Nuke (featuring Bad Azz & Yukmouth) | Bigg Bizz |
| 2003 | "California Cowboyz" | Down AKA Kilo (featuring Bad Azz) | California Cowboyz |
| 2003 | "Hot S***" | 40 Glocc (featuring Bad Azz & Westside Bugg) | The Jakal |
| 2003 | "Feel The Realist" | Ecay Uno (featuring Bad Azz, Cee Wee & Khaleedah Ishe) | Mental Scars |
| 2003 | "Eatin' The Weak" | Dj Jam (featuring Bad Azz) | WBALLZ 187.4 FM Vol. 1 |
| 2004 | "Gave 'Em A Few" | Snoop Dogg (featuring Bad Azz, E-White & Mac Minister) | Welcome 2 Tha Chuuch - Vol.1 |
| 2004 | "A.D.I.D.A.C." | Snoop Dogg (featuring Bad Azz, E-White, RBX & Lil Half Dead) | Welcome 2 Tha Chuuch - Vol.1 |
| 2004 | "All I Want" | Snoop Dogg (featuring Bad Azz) | Welcome 2 Tha Chuuch - Vol.1 |
| 2005 | "Its West Coast" | Killa Tay (featuring Bad Azz) | Flood the Market |
| 2006 | "Open Eyes" | The Dove Shack (featuring Bad Azz and Baby Boy Lil J) | Reality's Got Me Tied Up |
| 2006 | "Spread Ur Wings" | Young Brown (featuring Bad Azz, Sevin & Bokie Loc) | Out Tha Gate |
| 2006 | "Hate Me" | Various Artists (featuring Bad Azz, Mr. Trippalot & Dinero) | Los Angeles Gangsters |
| 2006 | "Gettin Mine" | E-White (featuring Bad Azz) | Play Your Position Vol. 7 - The White Out |
| 2006 | "Quatro OG-Mix" | Dj 2High (featuring Bad Azz) | West Coast Gangsta Sh*t Vol. 2 |
| 2006 | "So G'd Up" | Dj 2High (featuring Bad Azz & Tha Lowlifes) | West Coast Gangsta Sh*t Vol. 2 |
| 2006 | "Everyday" | Dj 2High (featuring Bad Azz & Bo-Roc) | West Coast Gangsta Sh*t Vol. 2 |
| 2006 | "Caught Up" | Bizzy Bone (featuring Bad Azz and Mr. Silent) | Thugs Revenge |
| 2006 | "I'm Feelin' You" | Westside Bugg (featuring Bad Azz) | The Roach Motel |
| 2006 | "Ride With Us" | Lil Sic (featuring Bad Azz) | The West Is Back |
| 2007 | "Tha Struggle" | Tangled Thoughts (featuring Bad Azz) | Every Hood's Tha Same |
| 2007 | "Original Gangstas" | Kavio (featuring Bad Azz, MC Eiht, Goldie Loc & Kokane) | Hitta's on Tha Payroll |
| 2007 | "Where U From" | Tha Dogg Pound (featuring Bad Azz) | Dogg Chit |
| 2008 | "That Go" | Dj 2High (featuring Bad Azz, Daz Dillinger & Keak Da Sneak) | West Coast Gangsta Sh*t Vol. 3 |
| 2008 | "Till I Die" | Roscoe (featuring Bad Azz) | Stray Dogg - Off Tha Leash, Off Tha Chain |
| 2008 | "Want It All" | Doc. Ce (featuring Bad Azz) | Qualified Hustla |
| 2008 | "Let's Bounce" | Dj AK (featuring Bad Azz & Pass Pass) | Killaz From Tha West |
| 2009 | "We Bacc On Tha Blocc" | Daz Dillinger (featuring Bad Azz, Goldie Loc, Soopafly, Kurupt & Snoop Dogg) | Who Ride wit Us: Vol. 4 |
| 2009 | "Throw Up The Dub" | Daddy V (featuring Bad Azz & Kk) | Compton N Long Beach |
| 2009 | "Ready 4 War" | Roscoe (featuring Bad Azz) | Philaphornia Pt. 2 Tha Philly Fanatic |
| 2009 | "Race Against Time" | Bizzy Bone (featuring Bad Azz) | Back with the Thugz |
| 2009 | "Wut They Say" | Slip Capone (featuring Bad Azz & Knoc-Turn'al) | Caponey Boy |
| 2010 | "California Living" | K9 (featuring Bad Azz) | Born & Raised In Compton |
| 2010 | "LA French Connect" | Daddy V (featuring Bad Azz, MC Eiht & Big2DaBoy) | LA French Connect |
| 2011 | "Welcome To L.A." | Dollah D (featuring Kris Monico, Forte, Bad Azz & Tiny Kurupt) | Go Funk YaSelf |
| 2011 | "Are You Listening?" | J. Rawls (featuring Bad Azz, Copywrite & Edo G.) | The Hip Hop Affect |
| 2012 | "If This Is Wrong" | Young Noble (featuring Mistah F.A.B. & Bad Azz) | Outlaw Rydahz Vol. 1 |
| 2012 | "Highest Mountain" | Sam Scarfo (featuring Bad Azz) | The Package |
| 2012 | "Chosen Few" | Young Trav (featuring Bad Azz) | Ruthless Mentality |
| 2012 | "Runnin" | Neoh (featuring Bad Azz & Konflict) | Raps, Tatts & Slaps |
| 2012 | "Knock It Off" | Gonzoe (featuring Bad Azz) | The Dispensary |
| 2013 | "Street Dreams" | Khavel X (featuring Bad Azz) | Maturity |
| 2014 | "California OG" | Yealhome and UD (featuring Soopafly, Butch Cassidy, Kokane & Bad Azz) | Flawless EP1 |
| 2015 | "Family First" | CartelSons (featuring Bad Azz, Celly Cel, Bookie & West Coast Stone) | The Hard Worker |
| 2016 | "U Neva Believed in Me" | Various Artists (featuring Bad Azz, E-White & Moe Z. MD) | Testimonial Game |
| 2016 | "Eyez Open" | Young Noble & Deuce Deuce (featuring Tray Deee) | The Code |
| 2016 | "Lets Go" | Young Doe (featuring Bad Azz & Trucc) | Welcome to the Maze |
| 2016 | "It's a Money Thang" | Sinek (featuring Bad Azz & MC Eiht) | Blue Magic |
| 2016 | "Do Ya Thang" | Young Trav (featuring Bad Azz) | Confessions of a Dangerous Mind |
| 2017 | "Can't Get Enough" | Terrance Peterson Chuuch (featuring Latoiya Williams, Badazz, 2scoops, Youngdoveshack, RayBell & Leon Roger) | Return of the Chuuch |
| 2018 | "Only God Can Judge Me" "Hear This Nuus" | NuuGame (featuring Duno, Bad Azz, & Rocky Peter) NuuGame (featuring Chris Sandoe, Tomi Favored, & Bad Azz) | The Chronicles |
