= The Wash (song) =

Single by Dr. Dre and Snoop Dogg

from the album The Wash
- Released: March 18, 2002
- Recorded: 2001
- Genre: West Coast hip-hop; G-funk
- Length: 3:16
- Label: Aftermath; Doggy Style; Interscope
- Songwriters: Andre Young; Calvin Broadus; Royal Harbor; Imsomie Leeper; Mark Jordan
- Producers: Dr. Dre; DJ Pooh

Dr. Dre singles chronology
"Bad Intentions" (2002)	"The Wash" (2002)	"Symphony in X Major" (2002)

Snoop Dogg singles chronology
"Wrong Idea" (2001)	"The Wash" (2002)	"Mission Cleopatra" (2002)

"The Wash" is a collaborative single by American rappers Dr. Dre and Snoop Dogg, recorded for and released as the second and final single from the soundtrack to the film of the same name. The song was produced by Dr. Dre and DJ Pooh. The song makes many references towards the lyrics in one of Dr. Dre's biggest hits, "Nuthin' but a 'G' Thang". Former Boston Red Sox second baseman Dustin Pedroia used the beginning of the song as his batting music until his retirement. In some territories, the song was a packaged as a double A-side with Bad Intentions, the lead single from The Wash.

== Track listing ==
- CD single
1. "The Wash" - 3:20
2. "The Next Episode" (Instrumental) - 2:42
- 12" vinyl
1. "The Wash" (Radio Mix) - 3:20
2. "The Wash" (LP Version) - 3:20
3. "The Wash" (Instrumental) - 3:20
4. "The Wash" (Acapella) - 3:20

== Chart ==
Chart (2001–02)	Peark position
France (SNEP)	58
US Bubbling Under Hot 100 (Billboard)	7
US Hot R&B/Hip-Hop Songs (Billboard)	43
US Radio Songs (Billboard)	23
