= List of Billboard number-one rap singles of the 2000s =

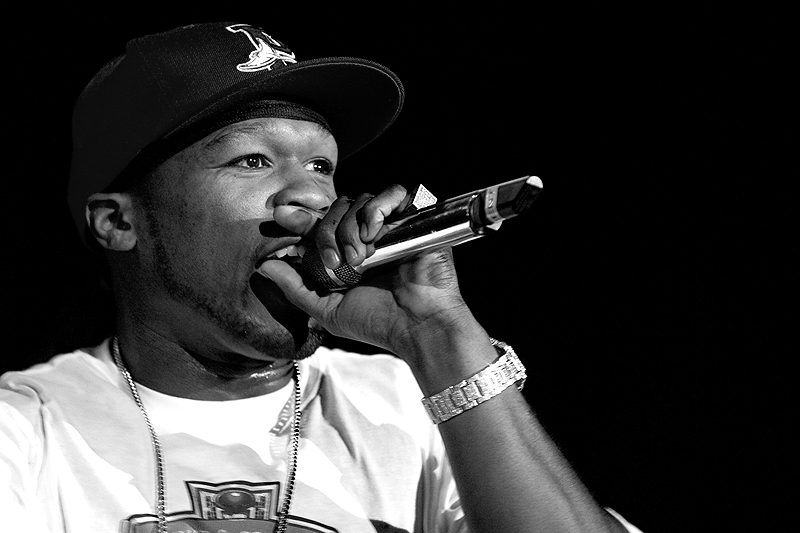
50 Cent was named the number-one Rap Songs artist of the 2000s by Billboard.

Hot Rap Songs is a record chart published by the music industry magazine Billboard which ranks the most popular hip hop songs in the United States. Introduced by the magazine as the Hot Rap Singles chart in March 1989, the chart was initially based solely on reports from a panel of selected record stores of weekly singles sales. The first song to reach number one on Hot Rap Singles during the 2000s was "Hot Boyz" by Missy Elliott featuring Nas, Eve and Q-Tip, which spent a record 18 weeks atop the chart from December 1999 to March 2000.

As a response to the music industry's move away from physical retail-available singles in the late 1990s, Billboard revamped the chart from a sales-based chart to an airplay-based chart in 2002. Named Hot Rap Tracks, the new chart's rankings were based on each track's estimated audience, as monitored by Nielsen Broadcast Data Systems from a panel of 134 radio stations. Speaking of the changes, Billboard stated that the new chart "more accurately reflects rap's most popular acts." The first number-one song to benefit from the changes was "I Need a Girl (Part One)" by P. Diddy featuring Usher and Loon, which rose from number twenty to the top spot the week the changes took effect.

By the end of the 2000s, 89 singles had topped the Rap Songs chart, with the final number-one hit being "Empire State of Mind" by Jay-Z featuring Alicia Keys. "Drop It Like It's Hot" by Snoop Dogg featuring Pharrell, which originally topped the chart for 10 weeks from November 2004 to January 2005, was the number-one single on the Billboard decade-end Rap Songs chart. The top Rap Songs artist of the 2000s was 50 Cent, who attained seven number-one singles during the decade—"In da Club", "21 Questions", "Magic Stick", "P.I.M.P.", "Candy Shop", "Hate It or Love It" and "Just a Lil Bit"—and tied with Bow Wow and Kanye West for the most number-one singles for any artist during this period.

== Number-one singles ==
Key
†	Billboard year-end number-one single
‡	Billboard decade-end number-one single
↑	Return of a single to number one

Single	Artist	Reached number one	Weeks at number one	Ref.
"Hot Boyz" †	Missy Elliott featuring Nas, Eve and Q-Tip	November 27, 1999	18	
"Whistle While You Twurk"	Ying Yang Twins	April 1, 2000	2	
"Wobble Wobble"	504 Boyz	April 15, 2000	6	
"Country Grammar (Hot Shit)"	Nelly	May 27, 2000	4	
"Flamboyant"	Big L	June 24, 2000	3	
"Callin' Me"	Lil Zane featuring 112	July 15, 2000	5	
"Bounce with Me"	Lil' Bow Wow featuring Xscape	August 19, 2000	2	
"Callin' Me" ↑	Lil Zane featuring 112	September 2, 2000	1	
"Bounce with Me" ↑	Lil' Bow Wow featuring Xscape	September 9, 2000	7	
"Move Somethin'"	Talib Kweli and Hi-Tek (Reflection Eternal)	October 28, 2000	1	
"It's OK"	Slimm Calhoun featuring André 3000	November 4, 2000	2	
"Souljas"	Master P	November 18, 2000	1	
"Baby If You're Ready"	Doggy's Angels featuring LaToiya	November 25, 2000	8	
"Oh No"	Mos Def and Pharoahe Monch featuring Nate Dogg	January 20, 2001	1	
"Baby If You're Ready" ↑	Doggy's Angels featuring LaToiya	January 27, 2001	1	
"Ms. Jackson"	Outkast	February 3, 2001	3	
"It Wasn't Me"	Shaggy featuring Ricardo "Rikrok" Ducent	February 24, 2001	2	
"Bow Wow (That's My Name)"	Lil' Bow Wow	March 10, 2001	4	
"What Would You Do?"	City High	April 7, 2001	6	
"My Baby" †	Lil' Romeo	May 19, 2001	10	
"Purple Pills"	D12	July 28, 2001	3	
"My Projects"	Coo Coo Cal	August 18, 2001	4	
"Raise Up"	Petey Pablo	September 15, 2001	10	
"Dansin wit Wolvez"	Strik 9ine	November 24, 2001	6	
"Round and Round"	Jonell featuring Method Man	January 5, 2002	8	
"Lights, Camera, Action!"	Mr. Cheeks	March 2, 2002	8	
"Feels Good (Don't Worry Bout a Thing)"	Naughty by Nature featuring 3LW	April 27, 2002	5	
"Ballin' Boy"	No Good	June 1, 2002	1	
"I Need a Girl (Part One)"	P. Diddy featuring Usher and Loon	June 8, 2002	1	
"Oh Boy" / "The ROC (Just Fire)"	Cam'ron featuring Juelz Santana / Cam'ron featuring Beanie Sigel and Memphis Bleek	June 15, 2002	4	
"Hot in Herre" †	Nelly	July 13, 2002	7	
"Dilemma"	Nelly featuring Kelly Rowland	August 24, 2002	10	
"Work It"	Missy Elliott	November 2, 2002	12	
"Air Force Ones"	Nelly featuring Kyjuan, Ali and Murphy Lee	January 25, 2003	2	
"In da Club" †	50 Cent	February 8, 2003	12	
"21 Questions"	50 Cent featuring Nate Dogg	May 3, 2003	7	
"Magic Stick"	Lil' Kim featuring 50 Cent	June 21, 2003	5	
"Right Thurr"	Chingy	July 26, 2003	4	
"P.I.M.P."	50 Cent	August 23, 2003	2	
"Get Low"	Lil Jon & the East Side Boyz featuring Ying Yang Twins	September 6, 2003	2	
"Shake Ya Tailfeather"	Nelly, P. Diddy and Murphy Lee	September 20, 2003	3	
"Get Low" ↑	Lil Jon & the East Side Boyz featuring Ying Yang Twins	October 11, 2003	1	
"Damn!"	YoungBloodz featuring Lil Jon	October 18, 2003	1	
"Stand Up"	Ludacris featuring Shawnna	October 25, 2003	8	
"The Way You Move"	Outkast featuring Sleepy Brown	December 20, 2003	5	
"Slow Jamz"	Twista featuring Kanye West and Jamie Foxx	January 24, 2004	7	
"One Call Away"	Chingy featuring J-Weav	March 13, 2004	3	
"Tipsy"	J-Kwon	April 3, 2004	5	
"Overnight Celebrity"	Twista	May 8, 2004	8	
"Slow Motion"	Juvenile featuring Soulja Slim	July 3, 2004	6	
"Lean Back" †	Terror Squad	August 14, 2004	12	
"Drop It Like It's Hot" ‡	Snoop Dogg featuring Pharrell	November 6, 2004	10	
"Lovers and Friends" †	Lil Jon & the East Side Boyz featuring Usher and Ludacris	January 15, 2005	8	
"Candy Shop"	50 Cent featuring Olivia	March 12, 2005	6	
"Hate It or Love It"	The Game featuring 50 Cent	April 23, 2005	4	
"Just a Lil Bit"	50 Cent	May 21, 2005	9	
"Let Me Hold You"	Bow Wow featuring Omarion	July 23, 2005	7	
"Like You"	Bow Wow featuring Ciara	September 10, 2005	4	
"Gold Digger"	Kanye West featuring Jamie Foxx	October 8, 2005	4	
"Soul Survivor"	Young Jeezy featuring Akon	November 5, 2005	6	
"I Think They Like Me"	Dem Franchize Boyz featuring Jermaine Dupri, Da Brat and Bow Wow	December 17, 2005	2	
"Grillz"	Nelly featuring Paul Wall, Ali and Gipp	December 31, 2005	10	
"Lean wit It, Rock wit It"	Dem Franchize Boyz featuring Lil Peanut and Charlay	March 11, 2006	7	
"What You Know"	T.I.	April 29, 2006	6	
"It's Goin' Down" †	Yung Joc	June 10, 2006	9	
"Shoulder Lean"	Young Dro featuring T.I.	August 12, 2006	3	
"Pullin' Me Back"	Chingy featuring Tyrese	September 2, 2006	6	
"Money Maker"	Ludacris featuring Pharrell	October 14, 2006	7	
"Shortie Like Mine"	Bow Wow featuring Chris Brown and Johntá Austin	December 2, 2006	7	
"We Fly High"	Jim Jones	January 20, 2007	3	
"Runaway Love"	Ludacris featuring Mary J. Blige	February 10, 2007	5	
"This Is Why I'm Hot"	Mims	March 17, 2007	7	
"I'm a Flirt"	R. Kelly featuring T.I. and T-Pain or Bow Wow featuring R. Kelly (Note: The original version of "I'm a Flirt" was recorded by Bow Wow featuring R. Kelly, and a remix was recorded by Kelly featuring T.I. and T-Pain. Due to their similar characteristics, plays for both versions were totaled under one chart listing.)	May 5, 2007	5	
"Party Like a Rockstar"	Shop Boyz	June 9, 2007	7	
"Make Me Better" †	Fabolous featuring Ne-Yo	July 28, 2007	6	
"Shawty"	Plies featuring T-Pain	September 8, 2007	3	
"Crank That (Soulja Boy)"	Soulja Boy	September 29, 2007	5	
"Good Life"	Kanye West featuring T-Pain	November 3, 2007	9	
"Low"	Flo Rida featuring T-Pain	January 5, 2008	11	
"Independent"	Webbie featuring Lil Phat and Lil Boosie	March 22, 2008	4	
"Lollipop" †	Lil Wayne featuring Static Major	April 19, 2008	14	
"A Milli"	Lil Wayne	July 26, 2008	7	
"Put On"	Young Jeezy featuring Kanye West	September 13, 2008	1	
"Whatever You Like"	T.I.	September 20, 2008	10	
"Live Your Life"	T.I. featuring Rihanna	November 29, 2008	10	
"Heartless"	Kanye West	February 7, 2009	5	
"Dead and Gone"	T.I. featuring Justin Timberlake	March 14, 2009	4	
"Kiss Me Thru the Phone"	Soulja Boy featuring Sammie	April 11, 2009	2	
"Dead and Gone" ↑	T.I. featuring Justin Timberlake	April 25, 2009	4	
"Kiss Me Thru the Phone" ↑	Soulja Boy featuring Sammie	May 23, 2009	2	
"Boom Boom Pow"	The Black Eyed Peas	June 6, 2009	1	
"Best I Ever Had" †	Drake	June 13, 2009	15	
"Run This Town"	Jay-Z featuring Rihanna and Kanye West	September 26, 2009	7	
"Forever"	Drake featuring Kanye West, Lil Wayne and Eminem	November 14, 2009	1	
"Empire State of Mind"	Jay-Z featuring Alicia Keys	November 21, 2009	9	

== Most number ones ==
Three or more number-one singles
Artist	Number-one singles
50 Cent Bow Wow Kanye West	7
Nelly T.I.	6
Ludacris T-Pain	4
Lil Wayne	3

== Bibliography ==
- Keyes, Cheryl Lynette (2004). Rap Music and Street Consciousness. University of Illinois Press. ISBN 978-0-252-07201-7.
