= Wrong Idea =

2001 single by Bad Azz and Snoop Dogg featuring Kokane, and Lil 1/2 Dead

Single by Bad Azz and Snoop Dogg featuring Kokane, and Lil ½ Dead

from the album Personal Business and Tha Last Meal
- Released: July 28, 2001
- Studio: Dogghouse Recording Studios
- Genre: West Coast hip-hop; gangsta rap; G-funk
- Length: 4:14
- Label: Doggystyle; Priority
- Songwriters: Calvin Broadus; Jamarr Stamps; David Drew
- Producer: Jelly Roll

Bad Azz singles chronology
"We Be Puttin' It Down!" (1998)	"Wrong Idea" (2001)

Snoop Dogg singles chronology
"Do U Wanna Roll (Dolittle Theme)" (2001)	"Wrong Idea" (2001)	"Loosen' Control" (2001)

Music video
- "Wrong Idea" on YouTube

"Wrong Idea" is a song by American rappers Bad Azz and Snoop Dogg featuring Kokane, and Lil 1/2 Dead. It was released in 2001 as the single of Bad Azz's studio album Personal Business and Snoop Dogg's fifth studio album Tha Last Meal, with the record labels Doggystyle Records and Priority Records.

== Track listing ==
- CD Single
1. Wrong Idea (Clean) (featuring Snoop Dogg, Kokane, and Lil' 1/2 Dead) — 4:03
2. Wrong Idea (Instrumental) — 4:17

== Chart performance ==
=== Weekly charts ===
Chart (2001)	Peak position
US Hot R&B/Hip-Hop Songs (Billboard)	75
US R&B/Hip-Hop Airplay (Billboard)	70
