= Baby If You're Ready =

2000 song by Doggy's Angels featuring LaToiya Williams

Single by Doggy's Angels featuring LaToiya Williams

from the album Pleezbaleevit!
- Released: November 25, 2000
- Recorded: 2000
- Genre: West Coast hip hop; G-funk; Gangsta rap
- Length: 3:40
- Label: TVT; Doggystyle
- Songwriters: Kola Difreda Marion, Kimberley Dawn Proby & other unknown writer
- Producers: Battlecat; Snoop Dogg

"Baby If You're Ready" is a song by American trio Doggy's Angels featuring LaToiya Williams. It was released on November 25, 2000, as the first single off their debut studio album Pleezbaleevit!. "Baby If You're Ready" went to No. 1 hit on the Billboard Rap Songs chart and stayed there for nine weeks.

== Track listing ==
- Side A
1. Baby If You're Ready (Clean) (featuring Latoya Williams) — 3:43
2. Baby If You're Ready (Instrumental) — 3:40
- Side B
1. Baby If You're Ready (Album version) (featuring Latoya Williams) — 3:43
2. Baby If You're Ready (Acapella) (featuring Latoya Williams) — 3:43

== Charts ==
=== Weekly charts ===
Chart (2000–01)	Peak position
Australia (ARIA)	26
Australian Urban (ARIA)	9
US Hot Singles Sales (Billboard)	18
US Hot R&B/Hip-Hop Songs (Billboard)	28
US Hot R&B/Hip-Hop Singles Sales (Billboard)	2
US Rap Songs (Billboard)	1

== See also ==
- List of Billboard number-one rap singles of the 2000s
