= The Knoc =

Single by Knoc-turn'al featuring Missy Elliott and Dr. Dre

from the album Knoc's Landin' and L.A. Confidential presents: Knoc-turn'al
- Released: February 19, 2002
- Recorded: 2001
- Genre: Hip hop
- Length: 4:17 (uncensored version); 4:07 (censored version)
- Label: Elektra
- Songwriters: R. Harbor; R. Monroe; D. Durant; F. Piacaios; R. Salon; M. Elliott; A. Young
- Producer: Dr. Dre

Knoc-turn'al singles chronology
"Bad Intentions" (2001)	"The Knoc" (2002)	"Muzik" (2002)

Dr. Dre singles chronology
"Bad Intentions" (2001)	"The Knoc" (2002)	"The Wash" (2002)

Missy Elliott singles chronology
"Oops (Oh My)" (2002)	"The Knoc" (2002)	"Burnin' Up" (2002)

"The Knoc" is a song by American rapper, Knoc-Turn'al. The song features guest vocals by hip-hop musicians Dr. Dre and Missy Elliott. It was originally released as the lead single for Knoc's unreleased album, Knoc's Landin (2002). In spite of the album's shelving, "The Knoc" initially saw a release on the summer EP, L.A. Confidential presents: Knoc-turn'al due to the single's Grammy nomination and charting on the Billboard Hot 100.

== Music video ==
A music video for the single was directed by Jeff Richter and premiered on MuchMusic in early February 2002. It begins with Knoc and Dre sitting at a restaurant, waiting for their order as the camera moves around in a continuous shot until the end of the video. Knoc is seen in multiple roles (such as a waiter, a crackhead, a pimp and a chef). When Knoc (as a waiter) drops dishes on the ground, Missy Elliott enters the restaurant singing her verses and meets up with her boyfriend (Knoc) at a table.

== Track listings and formats ==
12"/CD single

1. "Knoc" (Amended Version)
2. "Knoc" (Original Version)
3. "Knoc" (Instrumental)
4. "Knoc" (Acapella)
5. "Knoc" (TV Track)

== Chart performance ==
The song peaked at numbers 98 and 67 on the Hot 100 and the Billboard Hot R&B/Hip-Hop Songs respectively. Despite its underperformance on the charts, the song still garnered a Grammy nomination for "Best Short Form Music Video."

Chart (2002)	Peak position
U.S. Billboard Hot 100	98
U.S. Billboard Hot Rap Songs	13
U.S. Billboard Hot R&B/Hip-Hop Airplay	72
U.S. Billboard Hot R&B/Hip-Hop Songs	67
U.S. Billboard Rhythmic Top 40	28

== Release history ==
Region	Date	Format(s)	Label(s)	Ref.
United States	February 11, 2002	Rhythmic contemporary · urban contemporary radio	Elektra	
