= Butch Cassidy (rapper) =

American rapper (born 1973)

- Also known as: Danny "Butch" Means; Old School Butch
- Born: Danny Elliott Means II; December 11, 1973 (age 52); Long Beach, California, U.S.
- Genres: West Coast hip-hop; G-funk
- Occupations: Rapper; singer; songwriter
- Years active: 1994–present
- Labels: Doggystyle; BabyRee Inc; KCP Records; Means Family

Danny Elliott Means II (born December 11, 1973), better known by his stage name Butch Cassidy, is an American rapper and singer from Long Beach, California. He has worked with numerous West Coast hip-hop musicians, including Nate Dogg, Snoop Dogg, Kurupt, Daz Dillinger, Ice Cube, Xzibit, Warren G, Mack-10, Tray Deee, E-40, WC, DJ Quik, DJ Battlecat, Tha Eastsidaz and more.

== Discography ==
=== Albums ===
| Album details | Notes |
|---|---|
| Back B4 You're Lonely (with Damizza): Released: April 3, 2007; Label: BabyRee Inc, Fontana, Universal | Guest performers: Barbara Wilson, Bishop Lamont, Down, Jayo Felony, Noni Spitz, Roccett, Sno Bunny, Taje, Titus, Vanessa Marquez; Producers: Damizza, Dae One |
| I'm Here (hosted by King Kong Players): Released: 2011; Label: KCP Records | Guest performers: Snoop Dogg, Kurupt, Daz Dillinger, Pr1me, Celly Cel, Drastic, LaToiya Williams; Producers: Dae One, DJ Battlecat, "Jedi" Jared Moore |
| It's Official: Released: 2017; Label: KCP Records | Guest performers: Pr1me, Snoop Dogg |

=== Guest appearances ===
1994

- The Badlands / Papa Chuk / Vocals (Background)

1996

- Be Thankful / Nate Dogg & Butch Cassidy / Christmas on Death Row / Various / Performer

1998

- Scared Of Love / Nate Dogg & Danny "Butch" Means / G-Funk Classics, Vol. 1 & 2 / Nate Dogg / Co-composer / Performer
- Dirty Ho's Draw / Nate Dogg feat. Butch, Pamela Hale & DJ EZ Dick / G-Funk Classics, Vol. 1 & 2 / Nate Dogg / Performer
- I Don't Wanna Hurt No More / Nate Dogg & Danny "Butch" Means / G-Funk Classics Vol. 1 & 2 / Nate Dogg / Performer
- It's Goin' Down Tonight / Nate Dogg, Danny "Butch" Means & Isaac Reese / G-Funk Classics Vol. 1 & 2 / Nate Dogg / Performer

1999

- Represent Dat G.C. / Kurupt, Daz Dillinger, Snoop Dogg, Soopafly, Tray Deee, Jayo Felony & Butch Cassidy / Tha Streetz Iz a Mutha / Kurupt / Performer

2000

- Loud & Clear / Xzibit feat. Butch Cassidy, Defari & King T / Restless / Xzibit / Performer
- Let It Go / T.W.D.Y. feat. Butch Cassidy / Lead the Way
- G'd Up / Snoop Dogg, Butch Cassidy & Tha Eastsidaz / Snoop Dogg Presents: Tha Eastsidaz / Tha Eastsidaz / Performer
- Another Day / Snoop Dogg, Butch Cassidy & Tha Eastsidaz / Snoop Dogg Presents Tha Eastsidaz / Tha Eastsidaz / Co-composer / Performer
- How You Livin' / Snoop Dogg, Butch Cassidy & Tha Eastsidaz / Snoop Dogg Presents Tha Eastsidaz / Tha Eastsidaz / Performer
- Take It Back to '85 / Snoop Dogg, Butch Cassidy, Kurupt & Tha Eastsidaz / Snoop Dogg Presents Tha Eastsidaz / Tha Eastsidaz / Performer
- LBC Thang / Snoop Dogg, Butch Cassidy & Tha Eastsidaz / Snoop Dogg Presents Tha Eastsidaz / Tha Eastsidaz / Performer
- Wassup / Tha Eastsidaz feat. Butch Cassidy & Lil' Half Dead with Snoop Dogg verse / unreleased / Performer
- Lay Low / Snoop Dogg feat. Nate Dogg, Butch Cassidy, The Eastsidaz & Master P / Tha Last Meal / Snoop Dogg / Co-composer / Performer
- Loosen' Control / Snoop Dogg feat. Butch Cassidy, Soopafly / Tha Last Meal / Snoop Dogg / Co-composer / Performer
- Bang To Dis / Steady Mobb'n feat. Butch Cassidy / Crime Buddies

2001

- Tarantula / Tarantula / Mystikal / Performer
- This Gangsta Shit Is Too Much / Warren G feat. Butch Cassidy / The Return of the Regulator / Warren G / Performer
- They Lovin' Me Now / Warren G feat. Butch Cassidy & Boss Hogg / The Return of the Regulator / Warren G / Performer
- Young Locs Slow Down / Warren G feat. WC & Butch Cassidy / The Return of the Regulator / Warren G / Performer
- Connected for Life / Mack-10, Ice Cube, WC & Butch Cassidy / Bang or Ball / Mack 10 / Performer
- Domestic Violence / Too $hort, E-40 & Butch Cassidy / Chase the Cat / Too $hort / Vocals
- Cool / Butch Cassidy, Kokane, Nate Dogg & Tha Eastsidaz / Duces 'n Trayz: The Old Fashioned Way / Tha Eastsidaz / Performer
- Livin' In Da City / Butch Cassidy & Da Franchise / Violator: The Album, V2.0 / Various / Performer
- Livin' The Life / Prodigy of Mobb Deep, Jadakiss & Butch Cassidy / Violator: The Album, V2.0 / Various / Performer
- 2001 4dr. Cadillac / Bad Azz, Butch Cassidy & Ras Kass / Personal Business / Bad Azz / Vocals
- Bitches / Kurupt feat. Butch Cassidy & Roscoe / Space Boogie: Smoke Oddessey / Kurupt / Performer
- Can't Go Wrong / Kurupt feat. DJ Quik & Butch Cassidy / Space Boogie: Smoke Oddessey / Kurupt / Performer
- Sickness / X.O. Experience / Tha Alkaholiks / Performer
- The Courtroom (Skit) / Bullet Proof Love, Vol. 1 / Performer
- Gangsta Wit It / Snoop Dogg, Nate Dogg & Butch Cassidy / Bones (Movie Soundtrack) / Snoop Dogg / Performer
- Money, Sex & Thugs / D-Shot feat. E-40, Nate Dogg & Butch Cassidy / Money, Sex, & Thugs / D-Shot / Performer
- In The Game / Wiz Dinero feat. Butch Cassidy

2002

- You Say Keep It Gangsta / Wyclef Jean feat. Butch Cassidy & Sharissa / Masquerade / Wyclef Jean / Performer
- Tears Of A Killa / WC & Butch Cassidy / Ghetto Heisman / WC / Performer
- Da Get Together / WC & Butch Cassidy / Ghetto Heisman / WC / Performer
- Let's All Roll / Knoc-turn'al, Butch Cassidy, Jayo Felony & Slip Capone / L.A. Confidential Presents: Knoc-Turn'Al / Performer
- Just Dippin' (Battlecat Remix) / Snoop Dogg feat. Dr. Dre & Butch Cassidy / unreleased / Performer

2003

- Pimp the System / Butch Cassidy & Westside Connection / Terrorist Threats / Westside Connection / Vocals / Guest Appearance
- California / Sly Boogy, Butch Cassidy & Truth Hurts / Judgement Day / Sly Boogy / Guest Appearance
- California (Bay Remix) / Sly Boogy feat. E-40, 2Pac, Jayo Felony, Roscoe, Kurupt, Mistah F.A.B., San Quinn, Truth Hurts & Butch Cassidy / unreleased / Performer
- California (LA Remix) / Sly Boogy feat. Crooked I, Mack 10, 2Pac, Jayo Felony, Roscoe, Kurupt, Truth Hurts & Butch Cassidy / California 12"
- Dangerous / Dr. Stank feat. Butch Cassidy / Damizza presents... Baby Ree Mixtape Vol.1 / Performer
- Big Boyz / Gangsta, Ice Cube & Butch Cassidy / Penitentiary Chances / Gangsta / Performer
- A Thing of the Past / Damizza feat. Butch Cassidy, Roccett & Spit Fiya / unreleased / Performer
- Rude Awakening / Shade Sheist & Butch Cassidy / Damizza presents... Baby Ree Mixtape Vol.1 / Performer
- Look At Us Now / Mack 10 feat. Da Hood & Butch Cassidy / Ghetto, Gutter & Gangsta / Mack 10 / Performer
- Gangstaville / Ghetto Pros feat. Kurupt & Butch Cassidy / Ghetto Pros presents... The Album
- I Want You Girl / Butch Cassidy / Malibu's Most Wanted Movie Soundtrack / Performer
- Groupie Love / G-Unit & Butch Cassidy / Beg For Mercy / G-Unit / Performer
- Struggles / D-Shot & Butch Cassidy / Obstacles /Various / Composer / Performer
- Homeboyz / Tupac feat. Jadakiss, DMX & Butch Cassidy / Tupac: Rap Phenomenon II mixtape / DJs Vlad, Green Lantern & Dirty Harry / Performer
- Keep On Pressin' On / Tupac feat. Butch Cassidy / Tupac: Rap Phenomenon II / DJs Vlad, Green Lantern & Dirty Harry / Performer
- Weekend Jam / Lime Block & Butch Cassidy / Heated / Lime Block / Performer
- Money Rules / Fat-Tone, E-40, Nate Dogg & Butch Cassidy / I'mma Get Cha / Performer
- Starz / Stacee Adamz feat. Butch Cassidy / Gunz & Butter / Unreleased / Produced by Damizza / Performer

2004

- Talk To Me / Butch Cassidy feat. Barbara Wilson / The Baby Ree Mixtape 2004 / Performer
- Groupie Love / G-Unit feat. Butch Cassidy / The Baby Ree Mixtape 2004 / Performer
- So Dope / Butch Cassidy feat. Knoc-turn'al / The Baby Ree Mixtape 2004 / Performer
- Gangsta Lean / Damizza feat. Butch Cassidy, Jayo Felony, Titus Fuck & Down / The Baby Ree Mixtape 2004 / Performer
- So Cold / Butch Cassidy feat. DJ Quik / The Baby Ree Mixtape 2004 / Performer
- What Would You Do / Damizza feat. Mariah Carey, Nate Dogg & Butch Cassidy / The Baby Ree Mixtape 2004 / Performer
- Saturday Night *Damizza feat. Knoc-Turn'Al and L.T. Hutton / The Baby Ree Mixtape
- Throw Away Chick *Conway feat. Damizza / The Baby Ree Mixtape 2004 / Performer
- In 2's / Damizza feat. Butch Cassidy / The Baby Ree Japan Mixtape / Performer
- Top Ballin' / Damizza feat. Butch Cassidy / The Baby Ree Japan Mixtape / Performer
- Tight As Fuck / Butch Cassidy & Titus Fuck / The Baby Ree Japan Mixtape / Performer
- Dangerous / Dr. Stank feat. Butch Cassidy / The Baby Ree Japan Mixtape / Performer
- Once Lover / Butch Cassidy feat. Sno Bunny / The Baby Ree Japan Mixtape / Performer
- Crazy Ho' / Xzibit feat. Butch Cassidy, Strong Arm Steady & Suga Free / Weapons of Mass Destruction / Xzibit / Performer
- U Neva Know / Lil' Flip & Butch Cassidy / U Gotta Feel Me / Lil' Flip / Guest Appearance
- Western Conference / Conway feat. Butch Cassidy / How The West Was One / Performer / Produced by Damizza
- Doing This Foe Life / Goldie Loc, Tray Deee, Butch Cassidy & Blaqthoven / Tha After Party (Goldie Loc) / Gang Bang Muzic: Frequency Of The Streets (Tha Eastsidaz)
- Backstage / I-20 & Butch Cassidy / Self Explanatory / I-20 / Performer
- OG Anthem / I-20 & Butch Cassidy / Self Explanatory / I-20 / Performer
- Titus Fuk / Titus feat. Butch Cassidy / Damizza presents: The Baby Ree Mixtape Vol. III / Performer
- When Daddy Calls / Butch Cassidy / Damizza presents: The Baby Ree Mixtape Vol. III / Performer
- Doghouse Soul Food / Snoop Dogg feat. Butch Cassidy & Lil' Flip / The Revival / DJ Whoo Kid & Snoop Dogg / Performer
- Find A Way (Original Version) / 213 feat. Butch Cassidy / The Hard Way (Advance)

2005

- Don't Fuck With Us / Damizza feat. Butch Cassidy, Rocket, & Spitfiya / California Love Part 2 / Performer
- So Gangsta / Mack 10 & Butch Cassidy / Hustla's Handbook / Mack 10 / Performer
- We Roll / Guce & Butch Cassidy / Guce presents Pill Music The Rico Act, Vol. 1 / Guce / Performer
- Cognac & Doja / Mack 10, Butch Cassidy & Young Soprano / Hustla's Handbook / Mack 10 / Performer
- Soul Food / Kokane feat. Butch Cassidy, LaToiya Williams & Snoop Dogg / Mr. Kane Part 2 / Kokane / Performer
- I'm Gone / Capone feat. Devin The Dude & Butch Cassidy / Pain, Time And Glory / Capone / Performer
- Outro / Baby Bash feat. Butch Cassidy, Don Ciscone, Mr. Kee, Nino Brown & Russell Lee / Super Saucy / Baby Bash / Performer
- Ride Wit Me / The Relativez & Butch Cassidy / Money Respect Money / The Relativez / Performer

2006

- Tuff / Damani feat. Butch Cassidy / Congratulations Playa Mixtape by DJ Reflex & DJ Skee / Damani / Performer
- Back & Forth / Amir feat. Butch Cassidy / Lyrical Terrorism
- Just Like To Roll / Amir feat. Butch Cassidy / Lyrical Terrorism
- So Fly / Jayman feat. Butch Cassidy / All Questions Asked
- Bang This feat. Snoop Dogg

2007

- Cruzin' / Butch Cassidy / Back B4 You're Lonely / Performer
- A View From the Top / Butch Cassidy feat. Bishop Lamont / Back B4 You're Lonely / Performer
- Dodgeball / WC ft. Butch Cassidy & Snoop Dogg / Guilty by Affiliation / Performer
- Let Em Know / Kurupt & J. Wells feat. Tha Liks & Butch Cassidy / Digital Smoke
- History / Kurupt & J Wells feat. Butch Cassidy / Digital Smoke
- I Got Swagger / Butch Cassidy / Cali Connected Vol.9
- King Cong Playas / Butch Cassidy / King Cong Playas
- Picture Me Rollin' (Nu-Mixx) / 2Pac Feat. Kurupr, Butch Cassidy & Danny Boy / Nu-Mixx Klazzics Vol. 2
- Pain (Nu-Mixx) / 2Pac Feat. Styles P & Butch Cassidy/ Nu-Mixx Klazzics Vol. 2
- Pain (Alternative Remix) . 2Pac Feat. Styles P & Butch Cassidy/ Nu-Mixx Klazzics Vol. 2

2008

- All I See / Butch Cassidy feat. Snoop Dogg
- Cant Be Touched / Spirit feat. Butch Cassidy
- Take Me Away / Ice Cube Feat. Butch Cassidy / Raw Footage / Performer
- All On The Line / Indef feat. Butch Cassidy, Cubin, Noni Spitz & Young De / The Product
- Take A Picture / Spirit & Big Tank feat. Butch Cassidy / Swagga Juice
- Give It 2 U / Taje feat. Butch Cassidy & Prime / Get It Gang
- Street Life / Spider Loc feat. Butch Cassidy, Turf Talk & Kartoon / Da 1 U Love 2 Hate
- Sabotage Me / Pr1me feat. Butch Cassidy / The Transformation
- Now Here We Are / Pr1me feat. Butch Cassidy / The Transformation
- I Got Swagger (Remix) / Butch Cassidy feat. Pr1me / The Transformation
- Gangsta Love / Roscoe Umali feat Butch Cassidy, Problem & Styliztic Jones
- G-Shit / Lady Of Rage feat. Butch Cassidy, Gail Gotti & Kurupt / Westcoast Gangsta Shit Vol.3
- Kickin' / Kiki Smooth feat. Butch Cassidy / Westcoast Gangsta Shit Vol.3
- Cruzin' (Remix) / MC Magic feat. Butch Cassidy & Damizza / Princess/Princesa

2009

- Fast Car (prod. Qura) / Butch Cassidy
- Who Got The Girls / Butch Cassidy / Spirit feat. Fingazz / Performer
- Love It Or Leave It / Kitty feat. Butch Cassidy & Daz / Lyrical Gift
- Lubrication / Shot Callaz feat. Butch Cassidy / Sweet Dreams
- Real G'Z / Neoh & Konflikt feat. Butch Cassidy
- Who Wanna / Pr1me feat. Butch Cassidy / Pr1me presents: Stylafornia
- On Me / Glasses Malone feat. Butch Cassidy / Monster's Ink
- Playa$ Pimp$ Hu$$la$ / Hu$$le feat. Butch Cassidy / Hussle The Album
- What A Friend / Butch Cassidy
- We Made It / Rah Digga feat. Butch Cassidy / Digital Master Vol.2
- My World / Butch Cassidy / MySpace-Exclusive
- Mash / Butch Cassidy

2010

- Chillin' On The West Coast / Blues Brotherz (Butch Cassidy & Pr1me)
- Keep On Ridin' / Tha Dogg Pound feat. Butch Cassidy / Keep On Ridin'
- Spread Tha Luv / Tha Dogg Pound feat. Butch Cassidy, Latoya Williams & Celly Cel / 100 Wayz
- Behind Closed Doors / Swapper feat. Butch Cassidy / Connect 3 – The Streets Are Watching
- Six Feet Deep / Damizza feat. Butch Cassidy & Young De / DJ Wizkid Serving The Streets Vol.1
- So Gangsta (Original Version) / Butch Cassidy / DJ Wizkid Serving The Streets Vol.1
- So Gangsta / Snoop Dogg feat. Butch Cassidy / More Malice
- Gangsta Life / Platinum Stat feat. Butch Cassidy / The New West
- Summertime / Prime feat. Butch Cassidy / L.D.I. Radio Vol.1
- Behind Closed Doors / Snapper feat. Butch Cassidy / The Connect 3: The Streets Are Watching

2011

- Let's Make A Trip / Dogg Master feat. Butch Cassidy / Back In Town
- Get It In / Frost feat. Butch Cassidy / All Oldies

2012

- I Can Do Without You / E-40 feat. Butch Cassidy / The Block Brochure: Welcome to the Soil 2 (Bonus Track)
- Still In Business (Pus-Say) / King Tee feat. Xzibit, Silky Slim & Butch Cassidy

2013

- Moves I Make / Daz Dillinger and WC / West Coast Gangsta Shit

2014

- California OG / Bad Azz feat Soopafly, Butch Cassidy & Kokane / Flawless EP1
- Sun Down In CA / Keyon Stacks feat. Butch Cassidy

2015

- It's On / P Knuckle feat. Daz Dillinger, Young Maylay & Butch Cassidy / Perfect Timing - EP
- Keep It OG / Organized Cartel feat. Butch Cassidy

2016

- Here i come / Butch Cassidy & Mr. Ensane feat. Desert Rose prod. Ill Slim Collin / Grime Funk
- Get On Up / Butch Cassidy Produced by KING GRAINT

2018

- In 2 Deep / Damizza feat. Butch Cassidy & Glasses Malone / The Blacklist _Mizztape
- On The Westside / Amplified feat. Butch Cassidy / Authenticity
- We Made It / Rah Digga feat. Butch Cassidy

2025

- Worldwide Representin' (Remix) / CHG feat. Butch Cassidy

2026

- Hard 2 Find / Butch Cassidy & MNMsta (Foesum) prod. Ill Slim Collin
