= Loosen' Control =

Single by Snoop Dogg featuring Butch Cassidy

from the album Tha Last Meal
- Released: May 2001
- Genre: Hip hop
- Length: 4:09
- Label: No Limit; Priority
- Songwriter: Calvin Broadus
- Producers: Soopafly; Master P (exec.)

Snoop Dogg singles chronology
"Wrong Idea" (2001)	"Loosen' Control" (2001)	"The Wash" (2002)

Butch Cassidy singles chronology
"Lay Low" (2001)	"Loosen' Control" (2001)	"Tarantula" (2002)

"Loosen' Control" is a song from American rapper Snoop Dogg from his fifth album, Tha Last Meal. It was produced by Soopafly and Master P, and it features singer Butch Cassidy. The single was released in May 2001.

== Track listing ==
Track list
No.	Title	Length
1.	"Loosen' Control" (Clean) (Featuring Butch Cassidy)	4:09
2.	"Loosen' Control" (Instrumental)	4:14
3.	"Loosen' Control" (Call Out Hook)	0:10

== Credits ==
Credits adapted from Discogs.

- Executive-producer – Master P
- Mastered By – Brian "Big Bass" Gardner
- Mixed By – Tracey Brown
- Producer – Soopafly
- Written-By – C. Broadus, C. Reid, D. Means, H. Azor, P. Brooks, S. Brown, Galt MacDermot

Contains Replayed Elements From Space, Written and Performed By Galt MacDermot And a Vocal Sample From Funhouse By Kid N Play (C. Reid, H. Azor)
