= Back B4 You're Lonely =

Studio album by Butch Cassidy & Damizza
- Released: April 3, 2007
- Genre: West Coast hip hop
- Length: 47:25
- Label: Babyree Inc; Fontana
- Producer: Damizza; Dae One

Professional ratings
Review scores
Source	Rating
DubCNN.com	4/5 stars
RapReviews	4/10

Back B4 You're Lonely is a collaborative studio album by American rapper Butch Cassidy and record producer Damizza. It was released on April 3, 2007, through Babyree Inc with distribution via Fontana Distribution. Production was handled by Damizza and Dae One, with Bronek, Carlos "Los" Ramirez and Mikizza serving as co-producers. It features guest appearances from Barbara Wilson, Bishop Lamont, Down, Jayo Felony, Noni Spitz, Roccett, Sno Bunny, Taje, Titus and Vanessa Marquez.

An edited version of the song "In 2's" was in NBA Live 07.

== Track listing ==
No.	Title	Producer(s)	Length
1.	"Get Your Party On"	Damizza; Bronek^{[c]}	3:23
2.	"Cruzin'"	Damizza; Carlos Ramirez^{[c]}	4:22
3.	"In 2's"	Damizza	4:38
4.	"Talk to Me"	Damizza; Mikizza^{[c]}	4:00
5.	"Gangsta Lean" (featuring Jayo Felony, Titus & Down)	Damizza	3:32
6.	"Back B4 Your Lonely"	Damizza	4:26
7.	"Top Billin'" (featuring Barbara Wilson)	Damizza	3:52
8.	"Once Lovers" (featuring Sno Bunny)	Damizza	3:58
9.	"A View from the Top" (featuring Vanessa Marquez, Bishop Lamont & Roccett)	Damizza	4:05
10.	"Str8 Playa"	Damizza	3:24
11.	"Click, Clack!" (featuring Taje & Noni Spitz)	Dae One; Damizza^{[c]}	4:31
12.	"Tragic End"	Damizza	3:14
Total length:			47:25

Notes

- ^{^[c]} signifies a co-producer.

== Personnel ==
- Danny Elliott "Butch Cassidy" Means II – vocals, co-executive producer
- Damion "Damizza" Young – producer (tracks: 1–10, 12), co-producer (track 11), executive producer
- Juan Jose "Down AKA Kilo" Martinez – vocals (track 5)
- James "Jayo Felony" Savage – vocals (track 5)
- Titus – vocals (track 5)
- Barbara Wilson – vocals (track 7)
- Sno Bunny – vocals (track 8)
- Phillip Brandon "Bishop Lamont" Martin – vocals (track 9)
- Jerome Rockett – vocals (track 9)
- Vanessa Marquez – vocals (track 9)
- Noni Spitz – vocals (track 11)
- Taje – vocals (track 11)
- Dameon "Dae One" Garrett – producer (track 11)
- Bronek – co-producer (track 1)
- Carlos "Los" Ramirez – co-producer (track 2)
- Michael "Mikizza" Mijares – co-producer (track 4)
- Bernie Grundman – mastering
- Aaron Postil – co-executive producer, management
- Anthony Olguin – co-executive producer
- Edgar Sanchez – co-executive producer
