= I Luv It (Tha Eastsidaz song) =

Single by Tha Eastsidaz featuring Kokane

from the album Duces 'n Trayz: The Old Fashioned Way
- Released: June 2001
- Genre: G-funk
- Length: 5:00
- Label: Dogghouse / TVT
- Songwriters: Arthur Baker, Snoop Dogg, George Clinton, Bootsy Collins, Big Tray Deee, Battlecat (record producer), Kevin McCord, John Robie, Francisco Rodríguez, Goldie Loc, Bernie Worrell
- Producer: Battlecat

Tha Eastsidaz singles chronology
"Lay Low" (2001)	"I Luv It" (2001)

"I Luv It" is a song from American hip hop ensemble Tha Eastsidaz, released on 2001 as the single from studio album Duces 'n Trayz: The Old Fashioned Way. The song also features Kokane.

== Music video ==
A music video was filmed for the song, depicting a football game between prison guards and inmates at the fictional Long Beach Correctional Facility. The inmates compete under the name Tha Eastsidaz, mirroring the rap group's name. Willie McGinest, Curtis Conway, Gary Coleman, Nate Dogg, and Soopafly make cameo appearances as members of the inmates' team.

Throughout the video, Snoop Dogg appears both as a player and as the team's pimp coach. Frustrated by his team's poor performance, he threatens to revoke their conjugal visits unless they improve. The inmates subsequently mount a comeback, and a touchdown scored by Snoop Dogg gives Tha Eastsidaz the lead. Gary Coleman then secures the victory by kicking the game-winning field goal.

At the conclusion of the video, the football game is revealed to have been a music video playing on Snoop Dogg's television while he sleeps in a chair. After waking to answer a phone call, he joins fellow members of Tha Eastsidaz in a parody of the popular Whassup? commercials.

== Track listing ==
Tracks
No.	Title	Producer(s)	Length
1.	"I Luv It" (Clean)	Battlecat
2.	"I Luv It" (Instrumental)	Battlecat
3.	"I Luv It" (Acapella Clean)	Battlecat

== Charts ==
Chart (2001)	Peak position
US Hot R&B/Hip-Hop Songs (Billboard)	57
