= G'd Up =

1999 single by Tha Eastsidaz featuring Butch Cassidy

Single by Tha Eastsidaz featuring Butch Cassidy

from the album Tha Eastsidaz and 3 Strikes (soundtrack)
- Released: December 7, 1999
- Recorded: 1999
- Genre: West Coast hip-hop; gangsta rap; G-funk
- Length: 4:33
- Label: Doggystyle; TVT
- Songwriters: Calvin Broadus; Tracy Davis; Keiwan Spillman; Danny Means; Kevin Gilliam
- Producer: Battlecat

Tha Eastsidaz singles chronology
"G'd Up" (1999)	"Got Beef" (2000)

Butch Cassidy singles chronology
"G'd Up" (1999)	"Lay Low" (2001)

Music video
- "G'd Up" on YouTube

"G'd Up" is the debut single by American gangsta rap group Tha Eastsidaz, featuring vocals from American rapper/singer Butch Cassidy. The single was released on December 7, 1999 on the labels Doggystyle and TVT Records and is from the group's self-titled debut album. The song was produced by Battlecat.

== Commercial performance ==
The song became a moderate crossover hit, peaking at number 47 on the Billboard Hot 100, while finding better success on the Billboard Hot R&B/Hip-Hop Songs chart and Rap Songs chart, peaking at numbers 19 and 2 respectively.

== Music video ==
The music video was released in December 1999.

== Track listings ==
- Vinyl
1. "G'd Up" (street) - 4:34
2. "G'd Up" (clean) - 4:33
3. "G'd Up" (instrumental) - 4:32
4. "G'd Up" (acapella) - 4:08
- CD single
1. "G'd Up" (radio) - 4:33
2. "G'd Up" (instrumental) - 4:32

== Charts ==
=== Weekly charts ===
Chart (2000)	Peak position
Canadian Hot 100 (Billboard)	13
US Billboard Hot 100	47
US Hot R&B/Hip-Hop Songs (Billboard)	19
US Hot Rap Songs (Billboard)	2
US Rhythmic (Billboard)	27

=== Year-end charts ===
Chart (2000)	Peak position
US Hot R&B/Hip-Hop Songs (Billboard)	75
US Hot Rap Songs (Billboard)	10
