= The Wash (soundtrack) =

2001 soundtrack album by various artists

Soundtrack album by Various artists
- Released: November 6, 2001
- Recorded: 2001
- Studio: Various: Larrabee Sound Studios (Los Angeles, CA); Record One (Sherman Oaks, CA); 54 Sound (Detroit, MI); Axis Studios (Philadelphia, PA); Soundtrack Studios (New York, NY); Soundcastle (Los Angeles, CA); Noontime Studios (Atlanta, GA); Westlake Recording Studios (Los Angeles, CA); Teklab Studios (Cincinnati, OH); The Bank (Burbank, CA); Encore Studios (Burbank, CA)
- Genre: West Coast hip hop; gangsta rap
- Length: 1:08:42
- Label: Aftermath; Doggystyle; Interscope
- Producer: Dr. Dre; Mel-Man; Soopafly; Bryan-Michael Cox; Co-Lab-O; DJ Pooh; Eminem; Focus...; Hi-Tek; James Poyser; Jason Rome; J-Z; Jelly Roll; Mahogany; Megahertz; Timbaland; Vikter Duplaix; Jeff Bass

Singles from The Wash
- 1. "Bad Intentions" Released: November 2001; 2. "The Wash" Released: March 18, 2002

Professional ratings
Review scores
Source	Rating
AllMusic	3/5 stars
NME	3.5/5 stars
RapReviews	6/10

The Wash (The Original Motion Picture Soundtrack) is the soundtrack to DJ Pooh's 2001 comedy film The Wash. It was released on November 6, 2001 by Aftermath Entertainment, Doggy Style Records, and Interscope Records. Composed of seventeen tracks, the album featured performances from film stars Dr. Dre and Snoop Dogg, among other hip hop and R&B artists, such as Bilal, Bubba Sparxxx, Busta Rhymes, D12, Joe Beast, Knoc-turn'al, LaToiya Williams, Soopafly, Truth Hurts and Xzibit. Production was handled by several record producers, including Bryan-Michael Cox, Focus..., Hi-Tek, James Poyser, Megahertz, Mel-Man, Timbaland and Vikter Duplaix.

The album peaked at number 19 in the Billboard 200 and moved 785,000 units, achieving gold status by the Recording Industry Association of America on February 28, 2002. The recording won the 2002 Stony Award for Best Soundtrack.

Two singles were released from the album: "Bad Intentions" on January 7, 2002, and "The Wash", on March 18, 2002.

== Track listing ==
No.	Title	Writer(s)	Producer(s)	Length
1.	"On the Boulevard" (performed by Dr. Dre and Snoop Dogg)	D. Drew; E. Mollet; S. Green	Jelly Roll	4:28
2.	"Benefit of the Doubt" (performed by Truth Hurts, Lacci, and Shaunta)	S. Watson; S. Montgomery; M. Bradford	Mel-Man	4:50
3.	"Blow My Buzz" (performed by D12)	D. Holton; D. Porter; M. Mathers; O. Moore; R. Johnson; V. Carlisle; J. Bass	Eminem; Jeff Bass (co.)	5:08
4.	"Bring 2" (performed by Bilal)	B. Oliver; J. Poyser; V. Duplaix	James Poyser; Vikter Duplaix	4:20
5.	"Bad Intentions" (performed by Dr. Dre and Knoc-turn'al)	R. Harbor; E. Mollet; I. Leeper	Mahogany; Dr. Dre (co.)	3:02
6.	"Get Fucked Up With Me" (performed by Xzibit)	A. Joyner; J. Jackson	Jeremy "J-Z" Jackson	4:35
7.	"My High" (performed by Yero)	D. Young; J. Austin; B. Cox; J. Rome	Bryan-Michael Cox; Co-Lab-O; Jason Rome	3:35
8.	"Holla" (performed by Busta Rhymes)	T. Smith; A. Young; M. Elizondo; C. Kambon	Dr. Dre	4:02
9.	"Bubba Talk" (performed by Bubba Sparxxx)	A. Mathis; T. Mosley	Timbaland	3:48
10.	"Good Lovin'" (performed by Shaunta)	S. Montgomery; T. Cottrell; R. Harbor	Hi-Tek	3:39
11.	"Riding High" (performed by Daks and R.C.)	P. De Marks Jr.; B. Edwards; D. Gentry; R.C. Monge	Focus...	4:15
12.	"Gotta Get Dis Money" (performed by Soopafly)	P. Brooks	Priest "Soopafly" Brooks	4:51
13.	"Don't Talk Shit" (performed by Ox)	N. Breedlove; D. Wesley	Megahertz	4:23
14.	"Everytime" (performed by Toi)	P. Brooks	Priest "Soopafly" Brooks	4:05
15.	"Str8 West Coast" (performed by Knoc-turn'al)	R. Harbor; A. Young	Dr. Dre	2:54
16.	"No" (performed by Joe Beast)	M. Bradford; J. Ingram	Mel-Man	3:34
17.	"The Wash" (performed by Dr. Dre and Snoop Dogg)	C. Broadus; A. Young; R. Harbor; I. Leeper	Dr. Dre; DJ Pooh	3:20
Total length:				1:08:42

Notes

- Track 5 contains an interpolation from "Hollywood Hot" as recorded by Bob Crewe & Cinou Bullens
- Track 10 contains samples from "Mercy Mercy Me" and "God Is Love" as recorded by Marvin Gaye
- Track 14 contains a sample from "Get This Money" as recorded by Slum Village (originally a Herbie Hancock sample)

=== Tracks from the original motion picture ===
- "(Not Just) Knee Deep" – Funkadelic
- "Climax" – Ohio Players
- "Rapture" – Blondie
- "Take a Little Time" – Terrell C. Moses
- "No Other Love" – Faith Evans
- "I Ain't No Joke" – Eric Barrier and William Griffin
- "Encore Work Slow Evil" – Dr. Dre, Scott Storch & Mike Elizondo (incidental music)
- "Yo Ho" – Dr. Dre & Camara Kambon (instrumental)
- "2080 Guitar Beat" – Dr. Dre (incidental music)
- "Track 7" – Dr. Dre, Camara Kambon, Scott Storch & Mike Elizondo (incidental music)

== Personnel ==
- Andre Romelle Young – performer (tracks: 1, 5, 17), keyboards (track 15), producer (tracks: 8, 15, 17), co-producer (track 5), mixing (tracks: 1, 2, 5, 8, 15, 17)
- Calvin Cordozar Broadus Jr. – performer (tracks: 1, 17)
- Shaunta Montgomery – performer (tracks: 2, 10)
- Shari Watson – performer (track 2), additional vocals (track 8)
- Denaun Porter – performer & drum programming (track 3)
- Marshall Bruce Mathers III – performer & producer (track 3)
- DeShaun Dupree Holton – performer (track 3)
- Ondre Moore – performer (track 3)
- Rufus Johnson – performer (track 3)
- Von Carlisle – performer (track 3)
- Bilal Sayeed Oliver – performer (track 4)
- Royal Rosheam Harbor – performer (tracks: 5, 15)
- Alvin Nathaniel Joiner – performer (track 6)
- Yero Brock – performer (track 7)
- Trevor Smith – performer (track 8)
- Warren Anderson Mathis – performer (track 9)
- Ruben Cruz Monge – performer (track 11)
- Priest Joseph Brooks – performer & keyboards (track 12), engineering & producer (tracks: 12, 14)
- La'Toiya Ra'Shonne Williams – performer (track 14)
- Joseph Leynard Smith – performer (track 16)
- Saundralin Lee Green – additional vocals (track 1)
- Barbara Wilson – additional vocals (track 5)
- Diane Gordon – additional vocals (track 5)
- Kathy Merrick – additional vocals (track 5)
- Traci Nelson – additional vocals (tracks: 5, 17)
- David Lynn Young – additional vocals (track 7)
- Timothy Zachery Mosley – additional vocals, mixing & producer (track 9)
- Charlene "Tweet" Keys – additional vocals (track 9)
- Philip De Marks Jr. – additional vocals (track 11)
- Deana Evans – additional vocals (track 15)
- Kevin "Kirv" Irving – piano (track 2)
- Melvin Bradford – producer (tracks: 2, 16), keyboards (track 16)
- Jeffrey Irwin Bass – bass, keyboards, guitar, co-producer (track 3)
- James Poyser – keyboards, mixing & producer (track 4)
- Vikter Duplaix – drum programming, engineering, mixing & producer (track 4)
- Michael A. Elizondo Jr. – bass (tracks: 2, 5, 8, 17), keyboards (tracks: 2, 8, 15, 16), guitar (tracks: 5, 15)
- Timothy "Izo" Orindgreff – flute (track 5)
- Camara Kambon – keyboards (tracks: 5, 8)
- William Ed Pettaway Jr. – guitar (track 9)
- Charlie Bereal – additional guitar (track 9)
- Scott Spencer Storch – keyboards (tracks: 9, 13)
- Tony Louis Cottrell – bass, keyboards & producer (track 10)
- Bernard Edwards Jr. – bass, keyboards & producer (track 11)
- Dave Aron – engineering & mixing (tracks: 12, 14), keyboards (track 14)
- Don "Big June" Harris – bass (track 16)
- Sean Cruse – guitar (track 17)
- David L. Drew – producer (track 1)
- Imsomie Leeper – producer (track 5)
- Jeremy "Jay-Z" Jackson – producer (track 6)
- Bryan Michael Paul Cox – producer & assistant engineering (track 7)
- Jason Rome – producer (track 7)
- Dorsey Wesley – producer (track 13)
- Mark S. Jordan – producer (track 17)
- Mauricio Iragorri – engineering (tracks: 1, 2, 5, 8, 10, 15, 17)
- Richard "Segal" Huredia – engineering (tracks: 2, 6, 17), mixing (tracks: 3, 6)
- Steve Baughman – engineering (tracks: 2, 10, 16), mixing (tracks: 7, 10, 16)
- Claudio Cueni – engineering (track 2)
- Steve King – engineering (track 3)
- Tony Prendatt-Carter – engineering & mixing (track 4)
- Samuel Thomas – engineering (track 7)
- Steve Penny – engineering (track 9)
- Joe Warlick – engineering (tracks: 10, 11), mixing (track 11)
- Jimmy Douglass – engineering & mixing (track 9)
- Carlos Warlick – mixing (track 10)
- Duke Wagner – engineering (track 13)
- Kieran Wagner – engineering (track 13)
- Pop Wagner – engineering (track 13)
- Jason Goldstein – mixing (track 13)
- Tom Sweeney – engineering (track 15), assistant engineering (tracks: 2, 6, 17)
- Keith Cohen – engineering (track 16)
- Greg Burns – assistant engineering (tracks: 1, 2, 5, 8, 10)
- Ted Regier – assistant engineering (tracks: 1, 10)
- Urban Kris – assistant engineering (track 3)
- Darrell Thorp – assistant engineering (tracks: 8, 15, 16)
- Thomas Rounds – assistant engineering (tracks: 8, 17)
- Jeff Kanan – assistant engineering (track 9)
- Adam "Herb" Williams – assistant engineering (track 10)
- Drew Thomas – assistant engineering (track 11)
- Scott Whiting – assistant engineering (track 11)
- John Tyree – assistant engineering (track 15)
- Jeff Burns – assistant engineering (tracks: 16, 17)
- Chris Gehringer – mastering (track 9)
- Brian Knapp Gardner – mastering (tracks: 1–8, 10–17)
- Michael Lynn – A&R
- Jason Clark – art direction & design
- Larry Chatman – project coordinator (tracks: 1, 2, 5, 15, 17), production management
- Damon "Bing" Chatman – Aftermath project coordinator
- Andrew Van Meter – Interscope project coordinator
- Angelo Sanders – production management
- Kirdis Tucker – product management
- Lupe Ceballos – product management
- Michelle Thomas – product management
- Joel C. High – film music supervisor

Compilation credits

- Dr. Dre appears courtesy of Aftermath Entertainment
- Snoop Dogg appears courtesy of Doggystyle Records
- D-12 appears courtesy of Shady Records/Interscope Records
- Bilal appears courtesy of Moyo Music, Inc./Interscope Records
- Knoc-turn'Al appears courtesy of L.A. Confidential
- Xzibit appears courtesy of Open Bar Entertainment/Loud Records
- Yero appears courtesy of Noontime Music
- Busta Rhymes appears courtesy of Flipmode Records/J Records
- Bubba Sparxxx appears courtesy of Beat Club Records/Interscope Records
- Hi-Tek appears courtesy of Hi-Tek Publishing (BMI)
- RC appears courtesy of D&G Entertainment
- Soopafly appears courtesy of Fly2K Records/Doggystyle Records
- Toi appears courtesy of Fly2K Records
- Ox appears courtesy of Interscope Records

== Charts ==
=== Weekly charts ===
Weekly chart performance for The Wash
Chart (2001)	Peak position
Canadian Albums (Billboard)	9
French Albums (SNEP)	21
German Albums (Offizielle Top 100)	31
Dutch Albums (Album Top 100)	15
US Billboard 200	19
US Top R&B/Hip-Hop Albums (Billboard)	5
US Top Soundtracks (Billboard)	2

=== Year-end charts ===
Year-end chart performance for The Wash
Chart (2001)	Position
Canadian Albums (Nielsen SoundScan)	179
Canadian R&B Albums (Nielsen SoundScan)	39
Canadian Rap Albums (Nielsen SoundScan)	19

Chart (2002)	Position
Canadian R&B Albums (Nielsen SoundScan)	105
Canadian Rap Albums (Nielsen SoundScan)	58

== Certifications ==
Region	Certification	Certified units/sales
United States (RIAA)	Gold	500,000^{^}
^{^} Shipments figures based on certification alone.
