= Money Run =

Studio album by Bad Azz
- Released: March 11, 2003
- Studio: Lickwit Studios
- Genre: West Coast hip hop; gangsta rap
- Length: 45:45
- Label: Out Of Bounds; Double Dollar Sign Records
- Producer: Bad Azz (exec.); Pudgie (exec.); Weldon Angelos (exec.); Big Hollis (also exec.)

Bad Azz chronology
Personal Business (2001)	Money Run (2003)	Executive Decision (2003)

Money Run is the third solo studio album by American rapper Bad Azz. It was released on March 11, 2003, via Out of Bounds Entertainment/Double Dollar Sign Records. It features guest appearances from 40 Glocc, Big Hollis, Bonnie, Conflict, Kenya Baker, Marcel, LaToiya Williams, Lil' Tip Toe, Sene, Skee 64 Oz., Soopafly and Terrell Carter. The album peaked at number 85 on the Billboard Top R&B/Hip-Hop Albums chart in the United States.

== Critical reception ==
Professional ratings
Review scores
Source	Rating
HipHopDX	4/5
RapReviews	6.5/10
The Source	3/5 stars

Money Run received positive reviews from music critics. Soren Baker, in a review for Chicago Tribune, called it a strong album, praising Bad Azz for his "introspective rhymes" and his versatility in rapping about a wide range of topics. Ricardo Hazell of HipHopDX commended the album, saying that it is "one of the hottest joints out of L.A." of 2003. RapReviews's Matt Jost praised the album for its variety and Bad Azz for his vocal performance, as he "rides these beats with the usual ease, his lively voice always expressing a real care for the subjects and topics of his rhymes". The journalist criticized the rapper's lyrics for being too simple. In a review for The Source, Ryan Ford wrote: "Money Run proves that Bad Azz has not wavered too far from the road to success".

== Track listing ==
All music is composed by Walter Hollis.

No.	Title	Writer(s)	Length
1.	"Intro"	J. Stamps	1:32
2.	"If It's Hot" (featuring Sene & Big Hollis)	J. Stamps; S. Goss	4:46
3.	"Checking All the Spots" (featuring Big Hollis & Kenya Baker)	J. Stamps; W. Hollis; E. Baker	3:13
4.	"Do the Damn Thing" (featuring Bonnie)	J. Stamps; D. Napier	4:13
5.	"N 2Gether Now" (featuring 40 Glocc)	J. Stamps; T. Gasaway	3:00
6.	"Ghetto" (featuring Marcel, Big Hollis & K-Gee)	J. Stamps	4:15
7.	"My Street" (featuring Conflict & Terrell Carter)	J. Stamps; J. Cryer; J. Wilson; T. Carter; B. Williams	4:35
8.	"Money Run" (featuring Lil' Tip Toe & Conflict)	J. Stamps; J. Cryer; J. Wilson	3:52
9.	"Come and Get It" (featuring Bonnie, Big Hollis & Nick Noltifire)	J. Stamps; D. Napier	4:49
10.	"Its a Party" (featuring Soopafly & LaToiya Williams)	J. Stamps; P. Brooks; L. Williams	3:18
11.	"Groupie" (featuring Lil' Tip Toe, Conflict & Terrell Carter)	J. Stamps; J. Cryer; J. Wilson; T. Carter	4:11
12.	"California Sunshine / WBAD" (featuring Big Hollis, Lil' Tip Toe, Skee 64 & Sene)	J. Stamps; J. Cryer; S. Goss; T. Rios; W. Hollis	4:01
Total length:			45:45

Sample credits

- "California Sunshine" contains elements from "Tom's Diner" by Suzanne Vega

== Chart history ==
Chart (2003)	Peak position
US Top R&B/Hip-Hop Albums (Billboard)	85
