= Bad Intentions (song) =

Single by Dr. Dre featuring Knoc-turn'al

from the album The Wash
- Released: November 2001
- Recorded: 2001
- Genre: West Coast hip-hop; dirty rap
- Length: 3:01
- Label: Aftermath; Doggystyle; Interscope
- Songwriters: R. Harbor; E. Mollet; I. Leeper
- Producers: Mahogany Music; Dr. Dre

Dr. Dre singles chronology
| "Fast Lane" (2001) | "Bad Intentions" (2001) | "The Knoc" (2002) |

Knoc-turn'al singles chronology
| "The Watcher" (2001) | "Bad Intentions" (2001) | "The Knoc" (2002) |

"Bad Intentions" is a single by American rapper Dr. Dre, featuring vocals from fellow rapper Knoc-turn'al, recorded for and taken from the soundtrack to the film The Wash. The song was produced by Mahogany Music and co-produced by Dre himself. It contains a sample from "Hollywood Hot" by Eleventh Hour. The single was released in November 2001 . The song debuted on the UK Singles Chart at number four, staying in the charts for sixteen weeks. The music video for "Bad Intentions" depicts Dr. Dre and Knoc-turn'al filming a fictional music video at a burlesque house named "Bad Intentions". Rapper Jay-Z also used the instrumental in his diss track, "Supa Ugly", towards fellow rapper Nas, after the latter released "Ether", during their feud. The video features a cameo appearance from comedian Tommy Davidson.

== Track listing ==
- CD single
1. "Bad Intentions" - 3:02
2. "The Watcher" - 3:28
3. "The Next Episode" (featuring Snoop Dogg) - 2:42
4. "Bad Intentions" (Music Video)
- German CD single
1. "Bad Intentions" - 3:02
2. "Bad Intentions" (Instrumental) - 3:01
3. "The Watcher" - 3:28
4. "Bad Intentions" (Music Video)
- 12" vinyl
1. "Bad Intentions" (Clean Version) - 3:02
2. "Bad Intentions" (LP Version) - 3:02
3. "Bad Intentions" (Instrumental) - 3:01
4. "Bad Intentions" (Acapella) - 3:01

== Charts ==
| Chart (2001–02) | Peak position |
|---|---|
| Belgium (Ultratop 50 Flanders) | 30 |
| Belgium (Ultratop 50 Wallonia) | 30 |
| France (SNEP) | 45 |
| Germany (GfK) | 75 |
| Switzerland (Schweizer Hitparade) | 47 |
| Netherlands (Single Top 100) | 26 |
| UK Singles (OCC) | 4 |
| US Bubbling Under Hot 100 (Billboard) | 6 |
| US Hot R&B/Hip-Hop Songs (Billboard) | 33 |
