= Tha Last Meal =

2000 studio album by Snoop Dogg

Studio album by Snoop Dogg
- Released: December 19, 2000
- Recorded: 2000
- Genres: West Coast hip-hop; gangsta rap; G-funk
- Length: 77:03
- Labels: No Limit; Doggy Style; Priority
- Producers: Master P (also exec.); Dr. Dre; Mike Elizondo; Jelly Roll; Scott Storch; Meech Wells; Battlecat; Timbaland; Soopafly; Studio Ton; Carlos Stephens

Snoop Dogg chronology
Dead Man Walkin' (2000)	Tha Last Meal (2000)	Paid tha Cost to Be da Boss (2002)

Singles from Tha Last Meal
- 1. "Snoop Dogg (What's My Name Pt. 2)" Released: October 17, 2000; 2. "Lay Low" Released: March 20, 2001; 3. "Wrong Idea" Released: July 28, 2001; 4. "Loosen' Control" Released: 2001

Tha Last Meal is the fifth studio album by American rapper Snoop Dogg. It was released through No Limit, Doggy Style, and Priority Records on December 19, 2000. It was his third and final studio album released on No Limit, marking this record his first album on his newly founded label, called Doggy Style, alongside Priority in the United States. The album title makes reference to being the last record partially owned by his former label, Death Row Records. The album was produced by Dr. Dre, Timbaland, and Soopafly, among others. The album includes four official singles: "Snoop Dogg (What's My Name Pt. 2)", "Lay Low", "Loosen' Control", and "Wrong Idea". The album was generally met with mixed to positive reception.

== Background ==
In an interview with Rolling Stone, Snoop Dogg spoke on why he decided to name his album Tha Last Meal, stating:

The reason why I named it Tha Last Meal, is 'cause it's the last time these redneck label executives is gonna be eatin' off Snoop Dogg. And I'm not talkin' about Master P or No Limit. I'm talkin' 'bout Priority Records.

The single "Snoop Dogg (What's My Name II)" was nominated for Music Video of the Year at The Source Hip-Hop Music Awards 2001. The album was nominated Album of the Year at the same ceremony.

The single "Wrong Idea" was also included in Bad Azz's second album Personal Business released on Doggystyle. The video for the single was also attributed as a Bad Azz track that featured Snoop. Tha Last Meal was the final album from Snoop on No Limit Records.

== Critical reception ==
Professional ratings
Aggregate scores
Source	Rating
Metacritic	65/100
Review scores
Source	Rating
AllMusic	3.5/5 stars
Entertainment Weekly	C+
Los Angeles Times	2/4 stars
HipHopDX	3.5/5 stars
RapReviews	8.5/10
Rolling Stone	3.5/5 stars
The Source	4/5 stars
Spin	6/10
USA Today	3/4 stars
Vibe	3.5/5 stars

Rolling Stone - 3.5 stars out of 5 - "[His] strongest album since 1993's Doggystyle...Snoop's chronic-marinated flow, all menthol-cool and deadpan droop, sounds as smooth as ever."

Spin - 6 out of 10 - "This Meal finds him riding the Dre cache, trying to convince us he's still 'G'ed-up from the feet up'.... Timbaland stuttering out the obvious singles...but Dre's laconic thumps-by-the-pound anchor most of the album."

Vibe - 3.5 discs out of 5 - "Deeply steeped in P-funkology....these days, Snoop's songs are simply fun to listen to....nothing groundbreaking, just good solid Snoop-rap."

== Commercial performance ==
Tha Last Meal debuted at number nine on the US Billboard 200, selling 397,000 copies in its first week, marking the highest debut of the week. It serves as Snoop Dogg's fifth consecutive top-ten album in the United States. In its second week, the album jumped to number five on the Billboard 200, selling 248,000 copies. in the third week, the album reached its peak position, reaching the number four in the Billboard 200, selling 164,000 copies. The album spent four consecutive weeks on the top-ten of the Billboard 200. It serves as Snoop's fifth consecutive album to debut at number one on the US Top R&B/Hip-Hop Albums and remained at top for four consecutive weeks. On February 26, 2001, Tha Last Meal was certified Platinum by the Recording Industry Association of America (RIAA) for selling over 1 million copies in the United States. In the year of 2001, the album it selling 1.27 million copies, ranking as the 68th best-selling album of the year. As of March 2008, the album sales 2.068 million copies in the United States, marking the fourth best-selling album by Snoop Dogg's in the country, behind Doggystyle (1993) and Da Game Is to Be Sold, Not to Be Told (1998) and Tha Doggfather (1996).

== Track listing ==
No.	Title	Writer(s)	Producer(s)	Length
1.	"Intro"	Andre Young; Calvin Broadus; William Beck; Leroy Bonner; Marshall Jones; Ralph Middlebrooks; Marvin Pierce; Clarence Satchell; James Williams	Dr. Dre	1:21
2.	"Hennesey n Buddah" (featuring Kokane)	Young; Mike Elizondo; Broadus; Jerry Long	Dr. Dre; Mike Elizondo	4:11
3.	"Snoop Dogg (What's My Name Pt. 2)"	Timothy Mosley; William Bloom; Franklyn Smith; Broadus	Timbaland	4:03
4.	"True Lies" (featuring Kokane)	Young; Elizondo; Broadus	Dr. Dre; Mike Elizondo	4:00
5.	"Wrong Idea" (featuring Bad Azz, Kokane, and Lil' ½ Dead)	David Drew; Broadus; Jamarr Stamps; Larry Blackmon; Tomi Jenkins	Jelly Roll	4:14
6.	"Go Away" (featuring Kokane)	Meech Wells; Broadus; Long	Meech Wells	4:52
7.	"Set It Off" (featuring MC Ren, The Lady of Rage, Nate Dogg, and Ice Cube)	Mosley; Broadus; Lorenzo Patterson; Robin Allen; Nathaniel Hale; O'Shea Jackson	Timbaland	4:37
8.	"Stacey Adams" (featuring Kokane)	Kevin Gilliam; Broadus; Long	Battlecat	4:35
9.	"Lay Low" (featuring Master P, Nate Dogg, Butch Cassidy, and Tha Eastsidaz)	Young; Elizondo; Broadus; Percy Miller; Hale; Danny Means; Keiwan Spillman; Tracy Davis	Dr. Dre; Mike Elizondo	3:43
10.	"Bring It On" (featuring Suga Free and Kokane)	Drew; Broadus; Dejuan Walker; Long; David Payton; Clarence Roach	Clarence "Jimmy" Roach (co.)	4:17
11.	"Game Court (skit)" (featuring Mac Minista)	Marvin Whiteman; Andre Dow; Alan Tew	Studio Tone	2:10
12.	"Issues"	Wells; Broadus	Meech Wells	2:35
13.	"Brake Fluid (Biiittch Pump Yo Brakes)" (featuring Kokane)	Scott Storch; Broadus; Long; Allen Toussaint	Scott Storch	5:56
14.	"Ready 2 Ryde" (featuring Eve)	Storch; Broadus; Eve Jeffers	Scott Storch	4:21
15.	"Loosen' Control" (featuring Butch Cassidy)	Priest Brooks; Broadus; Means; Hurby Azor; Stanley Brown; Christopher Reid	Soopafly	4:09
16.	"I Can't Swim"	Drew; Casey Wilson; Broadus; George Clinton Jr.; William Collins; Bernie Worrell	Jelly Roll; Casey Wilson	4:17
17.	"Leave Me Alone"	Gilliam; Broadus; Blackmon; Jenkins; Nathan Leftenant; Charlie Singleton; Lonnie Simmons; Rudy Taylor; Charlie Wilson	Battlecat	4:12
18.	"Back Up Off Me" (featuring Master P and Mr. Magic)	Carlos Stephens; Broadus; Miller; Awood Johnson	Carlos Stephens	5:15
19.	"Y'all Gone Miss Me" (featuring Kokane)	Storch; Broadus; Long; Mick Jagger; Keith Richards	Scott Storch	4:15
Total length:				77:03

Sample credits

- "Intro" contains an interpolation of "I Want to Be Free", written by William Beck, Leroy Bonner, Marshall Jones, Ralph Middlebrooks, Marvin Pierce, Clarence Satchell, and James Williams.
- "Snoop Dogg (What's My Name Pt. 2)" contains an interpolation of "Double Dutch Bus", written by William Bloom and Franklyn Smith.
- "Wrong Idea" contains a sample from "Single Life", written by Larry Blackmon and Tomi Jenkins, as recorded by Cameo.
- "Bring It On" contains an interpolation of "I Need a Freak", written by David Payton.
- "Game Court (skit)" contains an interpolation of "The People's Court", written by Alan Tew.
- "Brake Fluid (Biiittch Pump Yo Brakes)" contains an interpolation of "Girl Callin'", written by Allen Toussaint.
- "Loosen' Control" contains a sample from "Funhouse", written by Hurby Azor, Stanley Brown, and Christopher Reid; as recorded by Kid 'n Play.
- "I Can't Swim" contains an interpolation of "Aqua Boogie", written by George Clinton Jr., William Collins, and Bernie Worrell.
- "Leave Me Alone" contains interpolations of:
  - "She's Strange", written by Larry Blackmon, Tomi Jenkins, Nathan Leftenant, and Charlie Singleton.
  - "Early in the Morning", written by Lonnie Simmons, Rudy Taylor, and Charlie Wilson.
- "Y'all Gone Miss Me" contains an interpolation of "Miss You", written by Mick Jagger and Keith Richards.

== Personnel ==
- Dave Aron – mixing (14)
- Tracey Brown – mixing (13, 15, 17–19)
- Jimmy Douglass – engineer (3), mixing (3)
- Dr. Dre – mixing (1, 2, 4–6, 8–12, 16)
- Mica Fisher – background vocals (1)
- Fredwreck – engineer (5)
- Brian "Big Bass" Gardner – mastering
- La Tonya Holmes – background vocals (1)
- The Lady of Rage – background vocals (3)
- Nate Dogg – background vocals (3)
- Traci Nelson – background vocals (1, 2)
- Jimmy Roach – lead bass and guitar (5, 6, 10, 16)
- Timbaland – mixing (3, 7)

== Charts ==
=== Weekly charts ===
Chart (2000–2001)	Peak position
Australian Albums (ARIA)	38
Australian Dance Albums (ARIA)	12
Belgian Albums (Ultratop Flanders)	47
Canadian Albums (Billboard)	15
Dutch Albums (Album Top 100)	32
French Albums (SNEP)	13
German Albums (Offizielle Top 100)	46
New Zealand Albums (RMNZ)	19
Scottish Albums (Official Charts)	63
Swedish Albums (Sverigetopplistan)	53
Swiss Albums (Schweizer Hitparade)	81
UK Albums Chart	62
UK R&B Chart	16
US Billboard 200	4
US Top R&B/Hip-Hop Albums (Billboard)	1

=== Year-end charts ===
Year-end chart performance for The Last Meal
Chart (2001)	Position
Canadian Albums (Nielsen SoundScan)	141
Canadian R&B Albums (Nielsen SoundScan)	32
Canadian Rap Albums (Nielsen SoundScan)	15
French Albums (SNEP)	106
US Billboard 200	37
US Top R&B/Hip-Hop Albums (Billboard)	7

== Certifications ==
Region	Certification	Certified units/sales
Canada (Music Canada)	Platinum	100,000^{^}
France (SNEP)	Gold	100,000^{*}
United Kingdom (BPI)	Gold	100,000^{^}
United States (RIAA)	Platinum	2,068,000
^{*} Sales figures based on certification alone.^{^} Shipments figures based on certification alone.

== See also ==
- List of number-one R&B albums of 2001 (U.S.)
