= L.A. Confidential presents: Knoc-turn'al =

L.A. Confidential Presents: Knoc-turn'al

EP by Knoc-turn'al
- Released: July 30, 2002
- Recorded: 2001–02
- Studio: Record One Studio (Sherman Oaks, CA); South Beach Studios (Miami Beach, FL); Westlake Audio (Los Angeles, CA); Larrabee West Studios (Los Angeles, CA)
- Genre: West Coast hip hop; g-funk
- Length: 23:51
- Label: Elektra
- Producer: Bud'da; Dr. Dre; Fredwreck; Kanye West; Knoc-turn'al; S-Dog; The Production Coalition Of America, Inc.; Wallace Sibley Jr.

Knoc-turn'al chronology
L.A. Confidential Presents: Knoc-turn'al (2002)	The Way I Am (2004)

Singles from L.A. Confidential Presents: Knoc-turn'al
- 1. "The Knoc" Released: February 19, 2002; 2. "Muzik" Released: January 6, 2003

Professional ratings
Review scores
Source	Rating
AllMusic	3/5 stars
RapReviews	8/10
USA Today	3/4 stars

L.A. Confidential Presents: Knoc-turn'al is the debut extended play by American rapper Knoc-turn'al. Originally it was supposed to be a full-length album titled Knoc's Landin', which was shelved due to undisclosed reasons and reduced to an EP released on July 30, 2002 through Elektra Records. Recording sessions took place at Record One Studio, Westlake Audio and Larrabee West Studios in Los Angeles and at South Beach Studios in Miami Beach. Production was handled by Dr. Dre, Bud'da, Fredwreck, Kanye West, S-Dog, the Production Coalition of America, Wallace Sibley Jr. and Knoc-turn'al himself, with executive producer D. Menefield and associate executive producer Jay Brown. It features guest appearances from Slip Capone, Butch Cassidy, Dr. Dre, Jayo Felony, Missy Elliott, Nate Dogg, Shade Sheist, Timebomb, Too Short, Warren G, Xzibit and Samuel Christian. The album peaked at number 74 on the Billboard 200 and number 26 on the Top R&B/Hip-Hop Albums in the United States.

Two singles were released from the album: "The Knoc" and "Muzik". Its lead single, "The Knoc", peaked at No. 98 on the Billboard Hot 100 and was nominated for a Grammy Award for Best Music Video at the 45th Annual Grammy Awards, but lost to Eminem's "Without Me". Its second single, "Muzik", found mild success on the French music chart, peaking at No. 70 after its appearance in the 2002 action-thriller film The Transporter.

Enhanced versions of the EP featured two multimedia extras: the music video for "The Knoc", and a behind-the-scenes feature titled "Bthere with Knoc" shot on location in New York City.

== Track listing ==
No.	Title	Writer(s)	Producer(s)	Length
1.	"The Knoc" (featuring Dr. Dre and Missy Elliott)	Royal Harbor; Andre Young; Melissa Elliott; Wallace Sibley Jr.; Francis Palacios; Ross Sloane	Dr. Dre; Wallace Sibley Jr.; The Production Coalition of America, Inc.	4:20
2.	"Muzik"	Harbor; Kanye West	Kanye West	3:33
3.	"Str8 Westcoast (Remix)" (featuring Warren G, Shade Sheist, Nate Dogg and Xzibit)	Harbor; Warren Griffin III; Tramayne Thompson; Nathaniel Hale; Alvin Joyner; Young	Dr. Dre	3:02
4.	"Let's All Roll" (featuring Slip Capone, Timebomb, Jayo Felony and Butch Cassidy)	Harbor; Christen Kelley; Marquese Holder; James Savage; Farid Nassar	Fredwreck	4:09
5.	"L.A. Nite-N-Day"	Harbor; S. Baptiste	Knoc-turn'al; S-Dog	4:21
6.	"Cash Sniffin' Noses" (featuring Too $hort and Slip Capone)	Harbor; Todd Shaw; Kelley; Holder; Stephen Anderson	Bud'da	4:26
Total length:				23:51

No.	Title	Length
7.	"The Knoc" (Music video)
8.	"Bthere with Knoc"

Sample credits

- Track 2 contains excerpts from "Old Sir, Siam" written by Paul McCartney as performed by Wings

== Personnel ==
- Royal "Knoc-turn'al" Harbor – vocals, producer (track 5)
- Andre "Dr. Dre" Young – vocals & mixing (track 1), producer (tracks: 1, 3)
- Melissa "Missy" Elliott – vocals (track 1)
- Samuel Christian – vocals (track 2)
- Tramayne "Shade Sheist" Thompson – vocals (track 3)
- Nathaniel "Nate Dogg" Hale – vocals (track 3)
- Alvin "Xzibit" Joiner – vocals (track 3)
- Warren Griffin III – vocals (track 3)
- Christen "Slip Capone" Kelley – vocals (tracks: 4, 6)
- Danny "Butch Cassidy" Means – vocals (track 4)
- James "Jayo Felony" Savage – vocals (track 4)
- Marquese "Time Bomb" Holder – vocals (track 4)
- Todd "Too $hort" Shaw – vocals (track 6)
- Wallace Sibley Jr. – producer (track 1)
- Francis Palacios – producer (track 1)
- Ross Sloan – producer (track 1)
- Kanye West – producer (track 2)
- Farid "Fredwreck" Nassar – producer (track 4)
- S. "S-Dog" Batiste – producer (track 5)
- Stephen "Bud'da" Anderson – producer (track 6)
- Carlos Bedoya – engineering (track 1)
- Tyson Leeper – recording (track 2)
- Richard "Segal" Huredia – mixing (tracks: 2, 4), recording (tracks: 5, 6)
- Kevin Guarnieri – engineering & mixing (track 3)
- Mauricio Iragorri – engineering (track 3)
- K. Solem Richard – mastering
- D. Menefield – executive producer
- Jay Brown – associate executive producer
- Joel Clifton – photography
- Estevan Oriol – photography
- P. Loc – photography

== Charts ==
Chart (2002)	Peak position
US Billboard 200	74
US Top R&B/Hip-Hop Albums (Billboard)	26
