= Hennesey'n Buddah =

Single by Snoop Dogg featuring Kokane

from the album Tha Last Meal
- B-side: "Set It Off"
- Released: 2001
- Genre: Hip hop
- Length: 4:11
- Label: No Limit; Priority
- Songwriters: Andre Young; Mike Elizondo; Calvin Broadus; Jerry Long
- Producers: Dr. Dre; Michael Elizondo

Snoop Dogg singles chronology
"Bow Wow (That's My Name)" (2000)	"Hennesey'n Buddah" (2001)	"Lay Low" (2001)

"Hennesey'n Buddah" is a song from American rapper Snoop Dogg from his fifth album, Tha Last Meal. It was produced by Dr. Dre and Michael Elizondo, and it features singer Kokane. The promo single was released in 2001.

== Charts ==
Chart (2001)	Peak position
France (SNEP)	41
