= Snoop Dogg (What's My Name Pt. 2) =

Single by Snoop Dogg

from the album Tha Last Meal
- Released: October 17, 2000
- Recorded: 2000
- Genre: Gangsta rap; West Coast hip-hop; Southern hip-hop; G-funk
- Length: 4:03
- Label: No Limit; Priority
- Songwriters: Calvin Broadus; Frankie Smith; Tim Mosely; Bill Bloom
- Producer: Timbaland

Snoop Dogg singles chronology
"The Next Episode" (2000)	"Snoop Dogg (What's My Name Pt. 2)" (2000)	"Bow Wow (That's My Name)" (2000)

"Snoop Dogg (What's My Name II)" is a song by Snoop Dogg, released as the first single from his fifth album, Tha Last Meal. It is the follow-up for one of his first singles, "Who Am I? (What's My Name?)". It was produced by Timbaland. Nate Dogg and Lady of Rage provided vocals for the chorus. The music video, directed by Chris Robinson, featured Dr. Dre, who is sat on a couch portrayed as a pimp with Snoop Dogg.

== Track listing ==
- Vinyl
1. Snoop Dogg (Explicit) — 4:10
2. Snoop Dogg (Instrumental) — 4:12
3. Back Up Ho (featuring Goldie Loc) (Produced by DJ Battlecat) (Explicit) — 4:19

== Chart performance ==
The song peaked at number 77 on the Billboard Hot 100 and at number 13 on the UK Singles Chart.

== Music video ==
The music video was shot in Vancouver, British Columbia, Canada. The intro of the music video was filmed on location in front of The Penthouse Gentleman's Club.

== Charts ==
Chart (2001)	Peak Position
Netherlands (Single Top 100)	58
Scottish Singles Sales (Official Charts)	18
UK Singles (Official Charts)	13
UK Hip Hop/R&B (Official Charts)	6
US Billboard Hot 100	77
US Hot R&B/Hip-Hop Songs (Billboard)	25
US Hot Rap Songs (Billboard)	8
US Rhythmic Airplay (Billboard)	25
