= Personal Business =

Studio album by Bad Azz
- Released: July 17, 2001
- Recorded: 2000–2001
- Genre: West Coast hip hop; gangsta rap
- Length: 1:12:13
- Label: Doggystyle; Priority
- Producer: Marvin Watkins (exec.); Snoop Dogg (exec.); Jelly Roll; DJ Battlecat; Blaqthoven; Big Hollis; DJ Don; Fredwreck; Lil' Beau; L.T. Hutton

Bad Azz chronology
Word on tha Streets (1998)	Personal Business (2001)	Money Run (2003)

Singles from Personal Business
- 1. "Wrong Idea" Released: 2001; 2. "How We Get Down" Released: 2001

Personal Business is the second solo studio album by American rapper Bad Azz from Long Beach, California. It was released on July 17, 2001 via Doggystyle Records and Priority Records. It features guest appearances from Blaqthoven, Busta Rhymes, Butch Cassidy, Doggy's Angels, Goldie Loc, Ice Cube, Jelly Roll, Kokane, LaToiya Williams, Lil' Beau, Lil' ½ Dead, Lil' Tip Toe, Mac Minister, Ras Kass, RBX, Salim Grant, Suga Free, Sylk-E. Fyne, Tha Dogg Pound and Val Young. The album peaked at number 59 on the Billboard 200 and number 16 on the Top R&B/Hip-Hop Albums charts in the United States.

== Critical reception ==
Professional ratings
Review scores
Source	Rating
AllMusic	2.5/5 stars
RapReviews	7.5/10 stars

A writer for AllMusic said, "Bad Azz's hardcore production adds the right flavor to his quick-tongued lyrics on songs such as "W.C. Plantation" and "Tha Money in the Briefcase," and he catches the high rollers with smoothed-out tracks like "Too Many Choices" and "It's On All Day." Joined by Ice Cube and Xzibit, on Personal Business Bad Azz gets his business right." Matthias Jost of RapReviews critiqued that Bad Azz comes across as "a more gangsta Xzibit" with his "characteristic photo-realistic delivery" and "bird's eye view" on the "dangerous side of the Cali lifestyle" and complimented the album's producers for creating "tracks [that are] the equivalent of chromed out cars", saying they have a candy paint sheen but bang hard like a "heavy metal chassis".

== Tracks listing ==
No.	Title	Writer(s)	Producer(s)	Length
1.	"Intro: Da Birth (Born Bad)" (featuring Mac Minister)	J. Stamps	Fredwreck	1:06
2.	"U Don't Wanna Be Broke"	J. Stamps	DJ Don	4:21
3.	"Get Yourz Now"	J. Stamps	Jelly Roll	4:47
4.	"Ready 2 Bang"	J. Stamps	Battlecat	2:45
5.	"Streetz Illustrated" (featuring Ice Cube)	J. Stamps; O. Jackson	Jelly Roll	4:27
6.	"When Bus Callz (Insert)" (featuring Busta Rhymes)		Big Hollis	0:49
7.	"Personal Business" (featuring Val Young)	J. Stamps; V. Young	Battlecat	3:53
8.	"We From The LBC" (featuring Snoop Dogg)	J. Stamps; C. Broadus	Walter Hollis; W. Angelo (co.)	3:44
9.	"Too Many Choices" (featuring Lil' Tip Toe & Lil' Beau)	J. Stamps; B. Dozier; J. Cryer	Lil' Beau	4:45
10.	"How We Get Down" (featuring Doggy's Angels & LaToiya Williams)	J. Stamps; L. Williams	Battlecat	4:30
11.	"2001 4dr. Cadillac" (featuring Ras Kass, Sylk-E. Fyne & Butch Cassidy)	J. Stamps; D. Means; J. Austin; L. Johnson	Blaqthoven	4:11
12.	"Money 2 Fold" (featuring Snoop Dogg & Kurupt)	J. Stamps; C. Broadus; R. Brown	Battlecat	4:29
13.	"When You See Me" (featuring Snoop Dogg, RBX & Kokane)	J. Stamps; C. Broadus; J. Long, Jr.; E. Collins	Jelly Roll	3:57
14.	"Dogghouse Ridaz" (featuring Snoop Dogg, Goldie Loc, Kokane & Suga Free)	J. Stamps; C. Broadus; J. Long, Jr.; K. Spillman; D. Rice	Battlecat	3:18
15.	"Don't Wanna Die" (featuring Daz Dillinger & Blaqthoven)	J. Stamps; D. Arnaud	Blaqthoven	4:10
16.	"Life Ain't Never What It Seems To Be" (featuring Jelly Roll)	J. Stamps; D. Drew	Jelly Roll	3:55
17.	"Wrong Idea" (featuring Snoop Dogg, Kokane & Lil' ½ Dead)	J. Stamps; C. Broadus; J. Long, Jr.; D. Smith	Jelly Roll	4:14
18.	"W.B.L.O." (Skit)		Dr. Dre	0:51
19.	"Life Ain't Hard" (featuring Jelly Roll & Blaqthoven)	J. Stamps	L.T. Hutton	4:04
20.	"It's On All Day" (featuring Salim)	J. Stamps; S. Grant	Jelly Roll	3:57
Total length:				1:12:13

Sample credits

- Track 10 contains elements from "Ain't We Funkin' Now" by The Brothers Johnson
- Track 14 contains elements from "Car Wash" by Rose Royce
- Track 17 contains elements from "Single Life" by Cameo

== Charts ==
Chart (2001)	Peak position
US Billboard 200	59
US Top R&B/Hip-Hop Albums (Billboard)	16
