= Lay Low (Snoop Dogg song) =

2001 single by Snoop Dogg

Single by Snoop Dogg featuring Master P, Nate Dogg, Butch Cassidy and Tha Eastsidaz

from the album Tha Last Meal
- Released: March 13, 2001
- Recorded: 2000
- Genre: West Coast hip hop; gangsta rap; mafioso rap
- Length: 3:43
- Label: No Limit; Priority
- Songwriters: Calvin Broadus; Tracy Davis; Mike Elizondo; Nathaniel Hale; Danny "Butch" Means; Alvin Joiner; P. Miller; Keiwan Spillman; Andre Young
- Producers: Dr. Dre; Mike Elizondo

Snoop Dogg singles chronology
"Hennesey'n Buddah" (2000)	"Lay Low" (2001)	"Just a Baby Boy" (2001)

Master P singles chronology
"He Did That" (2000)	"Lay Low" (2001)	"2-Way" (2002)

Tha Eastsidaz singles chronology
"Got Beef" (2000)	"Lay Low" (2001)	"I Luv It" (2001)

Nate Dogg single singles chronology
"Oh No" (2000)	"Lay Low" (2001)	"Can't Deny It" (2001)

Butch Cassidy singles chronology
"G'd Up" (1999)	"Lay Low" (2001)	"Loosen' Control" (2001)

Music video
- "Lay Low" on YouTube

"Lay Low" is the second single from Snoop Dogg's fifth studio album Tha Last Meal, released in March 2001. It features then-labelmate Master P, Nate Dogg, Butch Cassidy, and Tha Eastsidaz. It was produced by Dr. Dre and Mike Elizondo. The song received solid airplay and was featured on Snoop Dogg's Greatest Hits. The Hype Williams-directed, mafia-styled video features cameo appearances from Tha Dogg Pound's Kurupt and Soopafly.

== Charts ==
=== Weekly charts ===
Chart (2001)	Peak position
Germany (GfK)	49
France (SNEP)	81
Netherlands (Single Top 100)	33
Switzerland (Schweizer Hitparade)	48
US Billboard Hot 100	50
US Hot R&B/Hip-Hop Songs (Billboard)	20
US Hot Rap Songs (Billboard)	8
US Rhythmic Airplay (Billboard)	17

=== Year-end charts ===
Chart (2001)	Peak position
US R&B/Hip-Hop Songs (Billboard)	76
