= Got Beef =

Single by Tha Eastsidaz

from the album Snoop Dogg Presents: Tha Eastsidaz
- Released: April 3, 2000
- Genre: West Coast hip-hop; gangsta rap
- Length: 4:11
- Label: TVT
- Songwriters: Calvin Cordozar Broadus Jr.; Tracey Davis; James Savage; La'Mar Johnson; Lenton Tereill Hutton
- Producer: L.T. Hutton

Tha Eastsidaz singles chronology
"G'd Up" (1999)	"Got Beef" (2000)	"Lay Low" (2001)

Music video
- "Got Beef" on YouTube

"Got Beef" is a gangsta rap song performed by American West Coast hip hop trio Tha Eastsidaz. It was released on April 3, 2000 through TVT Records as the second single from the group's debut studio album Snoop Dogg Presents: Tha Eastsidaz. Produced by L.T. Hutton, it features guest appearances from Jayo Felony, Sylk-E. Fyne and Blaqthoven.

In the United States, the song reached number 99 on the Billboard Hot 100, number 55 on the Hot R&B/Hip-Hop Songs, number 50 on the R&B/Hip-Hop Airplay and number 38 on the Hot Rap Songs. It also peaked at number 23 in ARIA Top 50 Singles Chart.

An accompanying music video was directed by Chris Robinson.

== Track listing ==
12" vinyl
No.	Title	Producer(s)	Length
1.	"Got Beef" (Clean)	L.T. Hutton	4:05
2.	"Got Beef" (Album)	L.T. Hutton	4:12
3.	"Got Beef" (Instrumental)	L.T. Hutton	4:09
4.	"Got Beef" (Acapella)	L.T. Hutton	2:51
5.	"Ghetto" (Clean)	DJ Battlecat	4:17
6.	"Ghetto" (Album)	DJ Battlecat	4:39
7.	"Ghetto" (Instrumental)	DJ Battlecat	4:36
8.	"Ghetto" (Acapella)	DJ Battlecat	4:25

CD maxi single
No.	Title	Length
1.	"Got Beef" (Urban Radio Play Me Mix)	3:46
2.	"Got Beef" (Pauly B Dogbuoy Remix)	4:46
3.	"Got Beef" (Club Me Mix)	5:30
4.	"Got Beef" (Album Version)	4:13
5.	"G'd Up" (Album Version)	4:37

== Charts ==
Chart (2000)	Peak position
Australia (ARIA)	23
US Billboard Hot 100	99
US Hot R&B/Hip-Hop Songs (Billboard)	55
US R&B/Hip-Hop Airplay (Billboard)	50
US Hot Rap Songs (Billboard)	38
