= Snoop Dogg Presents: Tha Eastsidaz =

2000 studio album by Tha Eastsidaz

Studio album by Tha Eastsidaz
- Released: February 1, 2000
- Recorded: 1998–1999
- Genre: West Coast hip-hop; gangsta rap; G-funk
- Length: 72:36
- Label: Dogghouse; TVT
- Producer: Big Snoop Dogg (exec.); Battlecat; L.T. Hutton; Meech Wells; Goldie Loc; Keith Clizark; Warren G; JellyRoll; Blaqthoven

Tha Eastsidaz chronology
Snoop Dogg Presents: Tha Eastsidaz (2000)	Duces 'n Trayz (2001)

Snoop Dogg chronology
No Limit Top Dogg (1999)	Snoop Dogg Presents: Tha Eastsidaz (2000)	Dead Man Walkin' (2000)

Singles from Tha Eastsidaz
- 1. "G'd Up" Released: December 7, 1999; 2. "Got Beef" Released: April 3, 2000

Snoop Dogg Presents: Tha Eastsidaz is the debut album by American gangsta rap group Tha Eastsidaz. It was released on February 1, 2000, on Dogghouse Records and TVT Records. The album was recorded at Dogghouse Studio, Music Grinder & Skip Saylor Recording, Hollywood, California.

Most of the songs were performed live on Hustler's rap-porn compilation Snoop Dogg's Doggystyle XXX DVD. The executive producer was Snoop Dogg. The rapper's younger brother Bing Worthington, Jr. is also credited as an executive producer of the project.

== Critical reception ==
Professional ratings
Review scores
Source	Rating
AllMusic	4/5 stars
Entertainment Weekly	C+
Los Angeles Times	2.5/4 stars
RapReviews	7/10
The Source	4/5 stars
USA Today	2.5/4 stars

The album overall received generally positive reviews from music critics.

== Commercial performance ==
Tha Eastsidaz debuted at number 8 on the US Billboard 200, selling 100,000 copies in its first week. It was certificated Platinum on October 11, 2000.

== Music videos ==
Despite only two songs being released as singles, Tha Eastsidaz did a total of six videos for songs off the album: "Dogghouse" featuring Rappin' 4-Tay & Twinz, "G'd Up" featuring Butch Cassidy (directed by Diane Martel), "Got Beef" featuring Jayo Felony & Sylk-E. Fine (directed by Chris Robinson), "Now We Lay 'Em Down" featuring Kokane, "Tha Eastsidaz", and "The Gangsta in Deee".

== Track listing ==
No.	Title	Producer(s)	Length
1.	"Intro to Indo" (featuring Dr. Dre)	–	0:24
2.	"Now We Lay 'Em Down" (featuring Kokane)	Meech Wells	4:42
3.	"Tha Eastsidaz"	Meech Wells; Def Jef	2:57
4.	"Dogghouse" (featuring Twinz and Rappin' 4-Tay)	Goldie Loc	4:23
5.	"Give It 2 'Em Dogg" (featuring Bugsy Siegel)	Goldie Loc; Bugsy Siegel	3:29
6.	"Got Beef" (featuring Jayo Felony, Sylk-E. Fyne and Blaqthoven)	L.T. Hutton	4:11
7.	"Real Talk" (skit)	–	0:18
8.	"Balls of Steel" (Snoop Dogg solo)	Battlecat	3:11
9.	"Nigga 4 Life" (featuring Bad Azz)	Blaqthoven	4:10
10.	"G'd Up" (featuring Butch Cassidy)	Battlecat	4:33
11.	"Another Day" (featuring Butch Cassidy)	Jelly Roll	4:15
12.	"Tha Mac Ten Commandments" (skit)	–	0:46
13.	"Ghetto" (featuring Kokane, Kam and Nate Dogg)	Battlecat	4:39
14.	"Big Bang Theory" (featuring Xzibit, Kurupt, CPO and Pinky)	Warren G	4:28
15.	"Be Thankful" (featuring Kam, Pretty Tony and Warren G)	Battlecat	3:43
16.	"How You Livin'" (Snoop Dogg solo featuring Butch Cassidy)	Battlecat	2:38
17.	"Take It Back to '85" (Snoop Dogg solo featuring Kurupt and Butch Cassidy)	Soopafly	4:22
18.	"Tha G In Deee" (Big Tray Deee solo featuring Snoop Dogg)	Keith Clizark; Meech Wells	3:18
19.	"Tha Mac Bible: Chapter 2:11 Verse 187" (skit)	–	1:02
20.	"Pussy Sells" (featuring Suga Free)	L.T. Hutton	4:15
21.	"LBC Thang" (featuring Butch Cassidy)	Battlecat	3:22
22.	"Life Goes On" (Snoop Dogg solo featuring Kokane)	Meech Wells	3:34
Total length:			1:12:36

== Charts ==
=== Weekly charts ===
Chart (2000)	Peak position
Australian Albums (ARIA)	27
Canadian Albums (Billboard)	8
UK R&B Albums (OCC)	32
US Billboard 200	8
US Top R&B/Hip-Hop Albums (Billboard)	5

=== Year-end charts ===
Chart (2000)	Peak position
Canadian Albums (Nielsen SoundScan)	153
US Billboard 200	124
US Top R&B/Hip Hop Albums (Billboard)	47

== Certifications ==
Region	Certification	Certified units/sales
Canada (Music Canada)	Gold	50,000^{^}
United States (RIAA)	Platinum	1,000,000^{^}
^{^} Shipments figures based on certification alone.
