= Pleezbaleevit! =

Studio album by Doggy's Angels
- Released: November 21, 2000
- Recorded: 2000
- Studio: Dogghouse Recording Studios
- Genre: West Coast hip hop; G-funk; gangsta rap
- Label: Doggystyle; TVT
- Producer: Snoop Dogg (exec.); D. Black; DJ Battlecat; Fredwreck; Jelly Roll; Mark In The Dark; Meech Wells

Singles from Pleezbaleevit!
- 1. "Ridaz with Me" Released: August 1, 2000; 2. "Baby If You're Ready" Released: September 25, 2001

Professional ratings
Review scores
Source	Rating
Entertainment Weekly	B
HipHopDX	3/5

Pleezbaleevit! is the only studio album by American hip hop trio Doggy's Angels. It was released in 2000 through Doggy Style/TVT Records. Recording sessions took place at Dogghouse Recording Studios. Production was handled by DJ Battlecat, Fredwreck, Meech Wells, D. Black, Jelly Roll and Mark In The Dark, with Snoop Dogg serving as executive producer. It features guest appearances from Tha Eastsidaz, Kokane, LaToiya Williams, King Lou, Layzie Bone, Mac Minister, Morticia, Nate Dogg, Ruff Dogg, Soopafly and Suga Free.

The album debuted at No. 138 on the Billboard 200 and No. 35 on the Top R&B/Hip-Hop Albums charts in the United States. Its secong single, "Baby If You're Ready", reached No. 28 on the Hot R&B/Hip-Hop Songs, No. 2 on the Hot R&B/Hip-Hop Singles Sales and topped the Hot Rap Songs chart.

The release of the album led to a lawsuit by Columbia Pictures, claiming infringement of the Charlie's Angels franchise. The label responded by withdrawing the cover image and promotional artwork and renaming the band "Tha Angels", but in spite its efforts the group disbanded in 2002 with no further releases.

== Track listing ==
No.	Title	Producer(s)	Length
1.	"Baby If You're Ready" (featuring LaToya Williams)	DJ Battlecat	3:40
2.	"Curious" (featuring Snoop Dogg and Nate Dogg)	Fredwreck	4:46
3.	"Game To Get Over" (featuring Tha Eastsidaz)	DJ Battlecat	3:24
4.	"Told You So" (featuring Snoop Dogg)	DJ Battlecat	3:33
5.	"Gangsta In Me" (featuring LaToya Williams)	DJ Battlecat	4:23
6.	"Cold Crush Gangsta" (featuring Goldie Loc and Kokane)	Jelly Roll	3:13
7.	"Pleezbaleevit!" (featuring Snoop Dogg and Layzie Bone)	DJ Battlecat	3:56
8.	"Angels Make The World Go Round"	Fredwreck	3:54
9.	"Yac & Koke" (featuring Snoop Dogg)	DJ Battlecat	3:31
10.	"Bet I Never Slip" (featuring Suga Free and Snoop Dogg)	Fredwreck	4:35
11.	"Bitch N U (Skit)" (featuring Mac Minister)		0:50
12.	"Ridaz With Me" (featuring Snoop Dogg and Morticia)	Fredwreck	4:43
13.	"Snoopy Pryor (Skit)" (featuring Snoop Dogg)		0:20
14.	"Keep Your Head Up" (featuring Kokane)	D. Black; Mark In The Dark	4:48
15.	"Confessions Of A Hoodrat (Skit)"		1:56
16.	"Frontline" (featuring Snoop Dogg)	Meech Wells	3:46
17.	"Hoodtraps" (featuring Snoop Dogg and Kokane)	Meech Wells	4:25
18.	"Put Your Hands Up" (featuring Snoop Dogg, Soopafly, Kokane, King Lou and Ruff Dogg)	DJ Battlecat	5:34
19.	"Pop Your Collar 2 Dis" (featuring Snoop Dogg)	DJ Battlecat	3:53

== Personnel ==
- Chan Gaines – vocals
- Kimberly Proby – vocals
- Kola Marion – vocals
- LaToiya Williams – vocals (tracks: 1, 5)
- Calvin "Snoop Dogg" Broadus – vocals (tracks: 2–4, 7, 9, 10, 12, 13, 16–19), executive producer
- Nathaniel "Nate Dogg" Hale – vocals (track 2)
- Keiwan "Goldie Loc" Spillman – vocals (tracks: 3, 6)
- Tracy "Big Tray Deee" Davis – vocals (track 3)
- Jerry "Kokane" Long Jr. – vocals (tracks: 6, 14, 17, 18)
- Steven "Layzie Bone" Howse – vocals (track 7)
- Dejuan "Suga Free" Rice – vocals (track 10)
- Andre "Mac Minister" Dow – vocals (track 11)
- Morticia – vocals (track 12)
- Priest "Soopafly" Brooks – vocals (track 18)
- Louis "King Lou" Davenport – vocals (track 18)
- Ruffian "Ruff Dogg" Hall – vocals (track 18)
- Kevin "DJ BattleCat" Gilliam – producer (tracks: 1, 3–5, 7, 9, 18)
- Farid "Fredwreck" Nassar – producer (tracks: 2, 8, 10, 12)
- David "Jelly Roll" Drew – producer (track 6)
- Darin Jeffrey Black – producer (track 14)
- Marc "Mark In The Dark" D'Andrea – producer (track 14)
- Cecil Demetrius "Meech Wells" Womack Jr. – producer (tracks: 16, 17)
- Dave Aron – engineering
- Tracey Brown – engineering
- Brian "Big Bass" Gardner – mastering
- Marc Benesch – project coordinator
- Colin Jahn – art direction
- Cynthia Levine – photography
- Carol Sheridan – photography
- Shante Broadus – management

== Charts ==
Chart (2000)	Peak position
US Billboard 200	138
US Top R&B/Hip-Hop Albums (Billboard)	35
