= Knoc-turn'al =

American rapper

- Also known as: Knoc
- Born: Royal Rosheam Harbor; May 12, 1975 (age 51); Long Beach, California, U.S.
- Genres: Hip hop; gangsta rap; West Coast hip hop; soul
- Occupations: Rapper; singer; songwriter
- Years active: 1999–present
- Labels: Bogish Brand Entertainment; Elektra; Treacherous Records

Royal Rosheam Harbor (born May 12, 1975), known professionally as Knoc-turn'al, is an American rapper and singer.

== Discography ==
=== Albums ===
==== Studio albums ====
Title	Album details	Peak chart positions	
Title	Album details	US	US R&B
The Way I Am	Released: March 23, 2004; Label: L.A. Confidential, Elektra; Format: CD, LP, digital download	36	17
Knoc's Ville	Released: May 10, 2011; Label: Treacherous Records, Hoopla Worldwide; Format: CD, digital download		
Knight Vizion	Released: November 1, 2022; Label: Jubeeeco Entertainment; Format: Digital download		

==== Extended plays ====
List of albums, with selected chart positions
Title	Album details	Peak chart positions	
Title	Album details	US	US R&B
L.A. Confidential presents: Knoc-turn'al: Released: July 30, 2002; Label: L.A. Confidential, Elektra; Format: CD, digital download	74	26	

==== Mixtapes ====
- 1-11-11: The Prequel (2010)

=== Singles ===
==== As lead artist ====
List of singles, with selected chart positions, showing year released and album name
Title	Year	Peak chart positions			Album
Title	Year	US	US R&B	US Rap	Album
"The Knoc" (featuring Dr. Dre and Missy Elliott)	2002	98	67	13	L.A. Confidential presents: Knoc-turn'al
"Musik"	2002	—	110	—	L.A. Confidential presents: Knoc-turn'al
"The Way I Am" (featuring Snoop Dogg)	2004	—	78	—	The Way I Am
"I've Been Here For Years" (featuring Crooked I)	2011	—	—	71	Knoc's Ville
"—" denotes a recording that did not chart.

==== As featured performer ====
List of singles, with selected chart positions, showing year released and album name
Title	Year	Peak chart positions		Album
Title	Year	US	US R&B	Album
"Bad Intentions" (Dr. Dre featuring Knoc-turn'al)	2001	106	33	The Wash soundtrack
"Lights Out" (Mack 10 featuring Ice Cube, WC and Knoc-turn'al)	2003	—	61	Ghetto, Gutter & Gangsta
"—" denotes a recording that did not chart.

=== Guest appearances ===
List of non-single guest appearances, with other performing artists, showing year released and album name
Title	Year	Other artist(s)	Album
"Bang Bang"	1999	Dr Dre, Hittman	2001
"Keep It G.A.N.G.S.T.A. (Remix)"	2001	Nate Dogg, Lil' Mo	Non-album single
"Act Like You Know Me"	2002	Shade Sheist, Fabolous	Informal Introduction
"State of Emergency"	2003	Boo-Yaa T.R.I.B.E., Oyster Boy, King Lu	West Koasta Nostra
"Next Boyfriend"	2003	Nate Dogg	Nate Dogg
"U Ain't Knowin'"	2006	Suga Free	Just Add Water
"Got Me Going"	2007	J. Wells	Digital Smoke
"3 Bitches"	2008	Crooked I	Block Obama II: COB (Circle of Bosses)
"We Do This"	2009	Tash, King T, J Beam	Control Freek
