= Word on tha Streets (Bad Azz album) =

Studio album by Bad Azz
- Released: September 29, 1998
- Recorded: 1997–1998
- Genre: West Coast hip hop; gangsta rap
- Length: 1:10:14
- Label: Priority
- Producer: Marvin Watkins (exec.); Ant Banks; Big Kid; DJ Pooh; Gangsta; Kenny McCloud; Lil' Beau; Michael "Flip" Barber; Soopafly

Bad Azz chronology
Word on tha Streets (1998)	Personal Business (2001)

Singles from Word on tha Streets
- 1. "We Be Puttin' It Down!" Released: 1999; 2. "Ghetto Star" Released: 1999

Professional ratings
Review scores
Source	Rating
AllMusic	2.5/5 stars
The Source	3/5 stars

Word on tha Streets is the debut solo studio album by American rapper Bad Azz from Long Beach, California. It was released on September 29, 1998, via Priority Records. It features guest appearances from Tray Deee, Kurupt, Lil' Beau, Low Life Gangstas, Legacy, Outlawz, Snoop Dogg, the Comrads and the Lady of Rage. The album peaked at No. 182 on the Billboard 200 and No. 32 on the Top R&B/Hip-Hop Albums charts in the United States.

== Tracks listing ==
No.	Title	Writer(s)	Producer(s)	Length
1.	"We Be Puttin It Down!" (featuring Snoop Dogg)	J. Stamps; C. Broadus; M. Jordan	DJ Pooh	5:04
2.	"Ghetto Star"	J. Stamps; A. Banks	Ant Banks	4:27
3.	"Why U Don't Know?" (Insert)			0:28
4.	"I Ain't Concerned"	J. Stamps; A. Banks	Ant Banks	4:01
5.	"This Life of Mine" (featuring Outlawz)	J. Stamps; K. Cox; M. Greenidge; M. Barber; M. Beale; R. Cooper; S. Taylor	Flip	4:49
6.	"Livin It Up"	J. Stamps; T. Anderson	Gangsta	3:57
7.	"Love?" (Insert)			0:39
8.	"Tha Shit (Why Fuck wit Me?)"	J. Stamps; T. Anderson	Gangsta	3:55
9.	"Pawn Shop Robbery" (Insert)			0:18
10.	"Addicted to Crime" (featuring The Comrads)	J. Stamps; T. Anderson; K. Garmon	Gangsta	5:31
11.	"Money, Houses and Cars" (featuring Kurupt)	J. Stamps; P. Brooks; R. Brown	Priest "Soopafly" Brooks	4:53
12.	"Cookin' Cookies"	J. Stamps; G. Pagani; M. Carey	Big Kid	4:39
13.	"Continued Dedication" (featuring Low Life Gangstas)	J. Stamps; G. Pagani; M. Carey; E. Delahoussaye; J. Cryer; J. DeBear; J. Terry; K. Blackman	Big Kid	5:27
14.	"Darochee's M.C." (Insert)			0:18
15.	"A Hold on Hip Hop" (featuring The Lady of Rage and Legacy)	J. Stamps; P. Brooks; R. Allen; E. Walker	Priest "Soopafly" Brooks	4:04
16.	"School Girl" (Insert)			1:28
17.	"Tha Last Time" (featuring Lil' Beau)	J. Stamps; B. Dozier; A. DiFranco	Lil' Beau	4:05
18.	"Everythang Happens fo' a Reason" (featuring Tray Deee)	J. Stamps; K. McCloud; T. Davis	Kenny McCloud	4:17
19.	"My People"	J. Stamps; K. McCloud	Kenny McCloud; Gary "Sugarfoot" Greenberg (co.)	4:15
20.	"Tha Stand"	J. Stamps; K. McCloud	Kenny McCloud	3:31
Total length:				1:10:14

Sample credits

- Track 1 contains elements from "Get Up Offa That Thing" by James Brown, "South Bronx" by Boogie Down Productions, "Parental Discretion Iz Advised" by N.W.A, "More Bounce to the Ounce" by Zapp, "Message to B.A." by N.W.A
- Track 2 contains elements from "Friends" by Whodini, "Everybody Loves the Sunshine" by Roy Ayers
- Track 5 contains elements from "Everything Good to You (Ain't Always Good for You)" by B.T. Express
- Track 8 contains elements from "Get Up Offa That Thing" by James Brown, "South Bronx" by Boogie Down Productions
- Track 17 contains elements from "Buildings and Bridges" by Ani DiFranco

== Charts ==
Chart (1998)	Peak position
US Billboard 200	182
US Top R&B/Hip-Hop Albums (Billboard)	32
US Heatseekers Albums (Billboard)	16
