= Doggy's Angels =

American hip hop group

- Origin: Los Angeles, California, U.S.
- Genres: West Coast hip hop, G-funk
- Years active: 2000–2002
- Labels: TVT; Doggy Style
- Members: Big Chan; Coniyac; Kola

Doggy's Angels was an American rap trio formed by Snoop Dogg on the Doggy Style subsidiary of TVT. Members are Big Chan (Chan Gaines), Coniyac (Kim Proby-Davis) and Kola Loc (Kola Marion).

The group released one album and single in 2000. The album, Pleezbaleevit! peaked at number 7 on Billboard's Top Independent Albums chart, number 8 on the Heatseekers chart and number 35 on the Top R&B/Hip-Hop Albums chart. The single "Baby If You're Ready" ascended to number 1 on the Hot R&B/Hip-Hop Songs chart.

== Legal issues ==
The release of their debut album led to a lawsuit by Columbia Pictures, who claimed infringement against the Charlie's Angels franchise. The band was renamed "Tha Angels", but in spite of the success of their initial release produced no other albums before disbanding in 2002. In 2005, Chan Gaines sued the label for unpaid royalties for her performances in the band; the suit was settled on March 24, 2006.

== Discography ==
=== Albums ===
Year	Title	Chart positions		
Year	Title	US R&B	US Heat.	US Ind.
2000	Pleezbaleevit!	35	8	7

=== Singles ===
Year	Song	Chart positions			Album
Year	Song	US R&B	US Rap	AUS	Album
2000	"Baby If You're Ready"	28	1	26	Pleezbaleevit!
