= Bad Azz (rapper) =

American rapper (1975–2019)

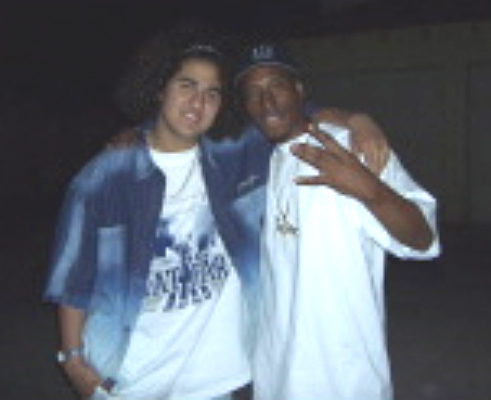
- Bad Azz and Nima in 2004

Background information
- Born: Jamarr Antonio Stamps; November 27, 1975; Hawaiian Gardens, California, U.S.
- Origin: Long Beach, California, U.S.
- Died: November 11, 2019 (aged 43) Murrieta, California, U.S.
- Genres: Hip-hop
- Occupation: Rapper
- Years active: 1996–2019
- Labels: Priority; Double Dollar Sign; Doggy Style
- Formerly of: LBC Crew

Jamarr Antonio Stamps (November 27, 1975 – November 11, 2019), better known by his stage name Bad Azz, was an American rapper and member of hip-hop collective D.P.G.C.

== Life and career ==
Jamarr Antonio Stamps was born in Hawaiian Gardens, California, and grew up in Long Beach. He began his career rapping at house parties and joined the LBC Crew. After having a guest verse on the Tupac song "Krazy" in 1996 he was set to sign to Tupac's proposed record label, Makaveli Records. After being briefly signed to Snoop Dogg's label Doggystyle Records, Bad Azz made various guest performances before debuting on Priority Records in 1998 with Word on tha Streets.

In 2001, he followed up with Personal Business whose single "Wrong Idea" (featuring Snoop Dogg, Kokane, and Lil' ½ Dead) reached #75 on the Hot R&B/Hip-Hop Songs Billboard chart.

In 2009, he released an album with Bizzy Bone, Thug Pound. In mid-2010, he recorded and released a new single "For As Long As I Can". In March 2013, Bad Azz got into a fight with Snoop Dogg's cousin Ray J; Bad Azz said it was revenge for getting jumped by Suge Knight and his entourage a decade earlier.

He appeared on the 2011 album Haven't You Heard? (We Givin' Something Bacc To Tha Street), which was released by Death Row Records and WideAwake on February 8, 2011.

In 2014, Bad Azz released a music video for a song titled "Baby Wut'z Up", featuring Turf Talk. He announced a new album title The Nu Adventures of Bad Azz, which has released in 2018.

== Death ==
Stamps died unexpectedly on November 11, 2019, at age 43. He had been arrested and jailed at the Southwest Correctional Center in Murrieta, California, on domestic violence charges four days earlier.

== Discography ==
Studio albums

- Word on tha Streets (1998)
- Personal Business (2001)
- Money Run (2003)
- Executive Decision (2003)
- The Nu Adventures of Bad Azz (2018)

Collaborative albums

- Thug Pound (with Bizzy Bone) (2009)
- Haven't You Heard (with LBC Crew) (2011)
