= Doggy Style Records =

American record label

- Founded: July 6, 1995; 31 years ago (as Dogghouse Records)
- Founder: Snoop Dogg
- Status: Active
- Distributors: TVT (1999—2002); Empire Distribution
- Genre: Hip-hop; R&B
- Country of origin: United States
- Location: Diamond Bar, California

Doggy Style Records (formerly known as Dogghouse Records) is an American record label founded by the rapper Snoop Dogg in 1995. It is named after Snoop Dogg's debut studio album, Doggystyle (1993).

The record label started out as a subsidiary of Death Row Records.

== History ==
On July 6, 1995, Doggy Style Records, Inc. was registered with the California Secretary of State as business entity number C1923139. After Snoop Dogg was acquitted of murder charges on February 20, 1996, he, his wife, their son and their kennel of 20 pit bulls moved into a 5,000-square-foot (460 m^{2}) home in the hills of Claremont, California and by August 1996, Doggy Style Records, a subsidiary of Death Row Records, signed The Gap Band's Charlie Wilson as one of the record label's first artists. Snoop Dogg's home office at the Claremont mansion served as the headquarters for Dogghouse Records.

On July 31, 2001, Tha Eastsidaz released their second studio album, Duces 'N Trayz: The Old Fashioned Way, through TVT and Doggy Style. It featured production from Dogghouse producer Fredwreck. The album was certified Gold by the RIAA for selling over 500,000 copies in America.

== Notable personnel ==
=== Current ===
- Snoop Dogg – chief executive officer (CEO) and founder
- Lupe Ceballos – General Manager (GM)
- Shante Broadus – Vice President (VP)

== Roster ==
=== Current artists and producers ===
Act	Years on the label	Releases under the label
Snoop Dogg	Owner; 1995–present	16
Soopafly	1995–present	—N/a
Tha Eastsidaz	1999–2003; 2014–present	3
Goldie Loc	1999–present	—N/a
Twinz	1999–present	—N/a
E-White	2001–present	—N/a
Warren G	2001–present	—N/a
LaToiya Williams	2001–present	—N/a
Kurupt	2001–present	—N/a
Lady of Rage	2002–present	—N/a
RBX	2002–present	—N/a
Lil' 1/2 Dead	2002–present	—N/a
Daz Dillinger	2003–present	—N/a
Fredwreck	1999–present	—N/a

=== Former artists ===
Act	Years on the label	Releases under the label
LBC Crew	1995–1997	1
Swoop G	1995	—N/a
Charlie Wilson	1996	—N/a
Doggy's Angels	2000–2002	1
Nate Dogg	2000-2011	1
Bad Azz	2000–2002	1
213	2002–2011	1
Tha Dogg Pound	2005–2020	1
Dubb Union	2006–2008	1

== Discography ==
=== Studio albums ===
Artist	Album	Details
Tha Eastsidaz	Snoop Dogg Presents: Tha Eastsidaz	Released: February 1, 2000; Chart positions: #8 U.S.; RIAA certification: Platinum
Snoop Dogg	Tha Last Meal	Released: December 19, 2000; Chart positions: #4 U.S.; RIAA certification: Platinum
Doggy's Angels	Pleezbaleevit!	Released: November 21, 2000; Chart positions: –; RIAA certification: –
Tha Eastsidaz	Duces 'n Trayz: The Old Fashioned Way	Released: July 31, 2001; Chart positions: #4 U.S.; RIAA certification: Gold
Bad Azz	Personal Business	Released: July 17, 2001; Chart positions: #59 U.S.; RIAA certification: –
Snoop Dogg	Paid tha Cost to Be da Boss	Released: November 26, 2002; Chart positions: #12 U.S.; RIAA certification: Platinum
213	The Hard Way	Released: August 17, 2004; Chart positions: #4 U.S.
Snoop Dogg	R&G (Rhythm & Gangsta): The Masterpiece	Released: November 16, 2004; Chart positions: #6 U.S.; RIAA certification: Platinum
Tha Dogg Pound	Cali Iz Active	Released: June 27, 2006; Chart positions: #28 U.S.
Snoop Dogg	Tha Blue Carpet Treatment	Released: November 21, 2006; Chart positions: #5 U.S.; RIAA certification: Platinum
Snoop Dogg	Ego Trippin'	Released: March 11, 2008; Chart positions: #3 U.S.; RIAA certifications: –
Snoop Dogg	Malice n Wonderland	Released: December 8, 2009; Chart positions: #23 U.S.; RIAA certification: –
Snoop Dogg	Doggumentary	Released: March 29, 2011; Chart positions: #8 U.S.
Snoop Dogg	Bush	Released: May 12, 2015; Chart positions: #14 U.S.
Snoop Dogg	Coolaid	Released: July 1, 2016; Chart positions: #40 U.S.
Snoop Dogg	Neva Left	Released: May 19, 2017; Chart positions: #54 U.S.
Snoop Dogg	I Wanna Thank Me	Released: August 16, 2019; Chart positions: #76 U.S.
Snoop Dogg	From tha Streets 2 tha Suites	Released: April 20, 2021; Chart positions:
Snoop Dogg	Snoop Dogg Presents Algorithm	Released: November 19, 2021; Chart positions: #166 U.S.

=== Compilation albums ===
Artist	Album	Details
Various Artists	Bones	Released: October 9, 2001; Chart positions: #39 U.S.; RIAA certification: –
Various Artists	The Wash	Released: November 6, 2001; Chart positions: #19 U.S.; RIAA certification: Gold
Various Artists	Snoop Dogg Presents... Doggy Style Allstars Vol. 1	Released: August 13, 2002; Chart positions: #19 U.S.; RIAA certification: –
Various Artists	Bigg Snoop Dogg Presents... Welcome to tha Chuuch: Da Album	Released: December 13, 2005; Chart positions: #184 U.S.
