= 21st AVN Awards =

US adult industry award ceremony in 2004

- 2004 AVN Awards Show Program cover
- Date: January 10, 2004
- Site: The Venetian Las Vegas at Paradise, Nevada, U.S.A.
- Hosted by: Jenna Jameson; Jim Norton
- Preshow hosts: Chi Chi LaRue
- Produced by: Gary Miller
- Directed by: Gary Miller

Highlights
- Best Picture: Heart of Darkness (Best Film)
- Most awards: Space Nuts (6)
- Most nominations: Rawhide (15)

Television coverage
- Network: Playboy TV
- Duration: Just under 2 hours

The 21st AVN Awards ceremony, presented by Adult Video News (AVN), took place January 10, 2004 at the Venetian Hotel Grand Ballroom, at Paradise, Nevada, U.S. During the ceremony, AVN presented AVN Awards in 94 categories honoring the best pornographic films released between Oct. 1, 2002 and Sept. 30, 2003. The ceremony, televised in the United States by Playboy TV, was produced and directed by Gary Miller. Comedian Jim Norton hosted the show for the first time with adult film star Jenna Jameson in her third stint as co-host.

Heart of Darkness won five awards including Best Director—Film for Paul Thomas and Best Film, however, Space Nuts took home the most awards, with six. Other multiple winners included Rawhide, with five awards; Beautiful and Hard Edge with four wins apiece and Fetish: The Dream Scape and Looking In with three each.

== Winners and nominees ==
The nominees for the 21st AVN Awards were announced on December 1, 2003. Rawhide received the most nominations with 15, followed by Heart of Darkness with 14, Space Nuts and Compulsion each with 13 and Beautiful with 12.

The winners were announced during the awards ceremony on January 10, 2004. Space Nuts, a shot-on-video feature with six wins, became one of the rare movies that didn't win a best picture category; those having been won by Heart of Darkness (Best Film), Rawhide and Beautiful tying for Best Video Feature and The Fashionistas capturing Best DVD. The tie of Rawhide and Beautiful for Best Video Feature was a first for that category. AVN's voting procedure in the event of a tie is "Those voters on the AVN full-time staff who did no vote for either of the videos during the original balloting must revote." But even after that step a tie still existed, so AVN senior management decided to let the result stand.

=== Major awards ===
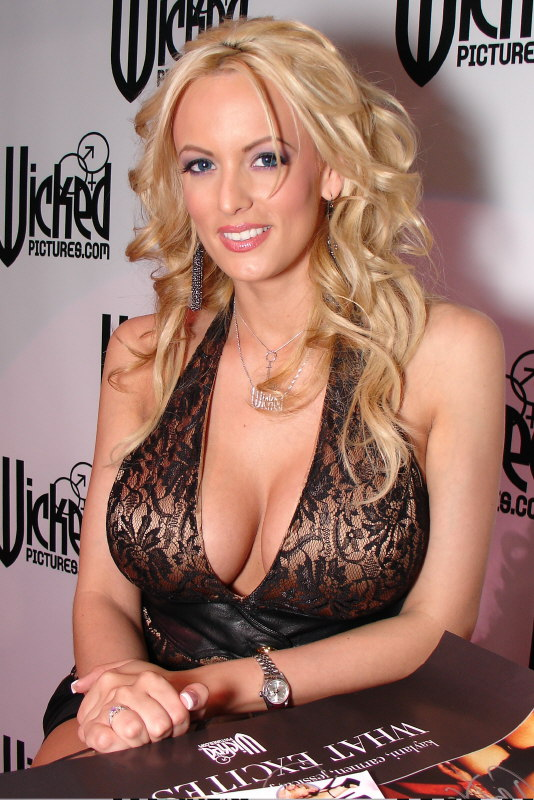
Stormy, Best New Starlet winner

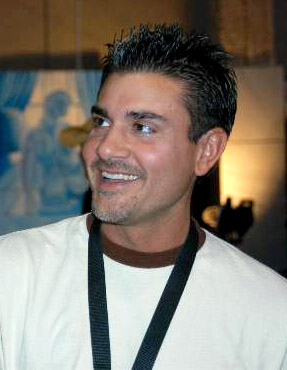
Michael Stefano, Male Performer of the Year winner

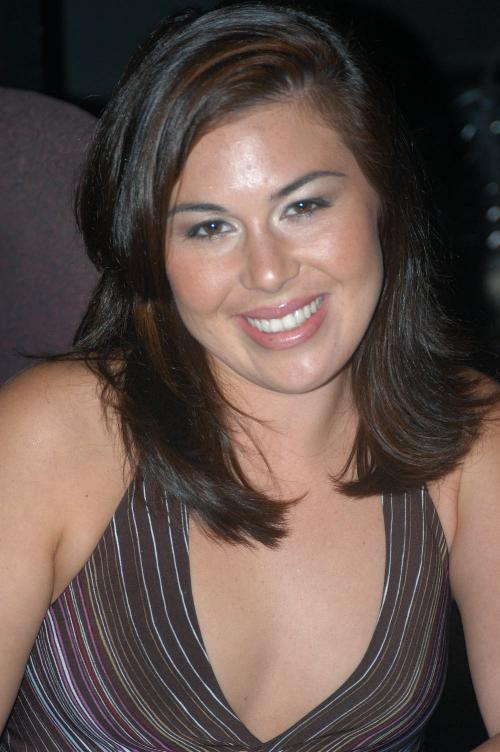
Ashley Blue, Female Performer of the Year

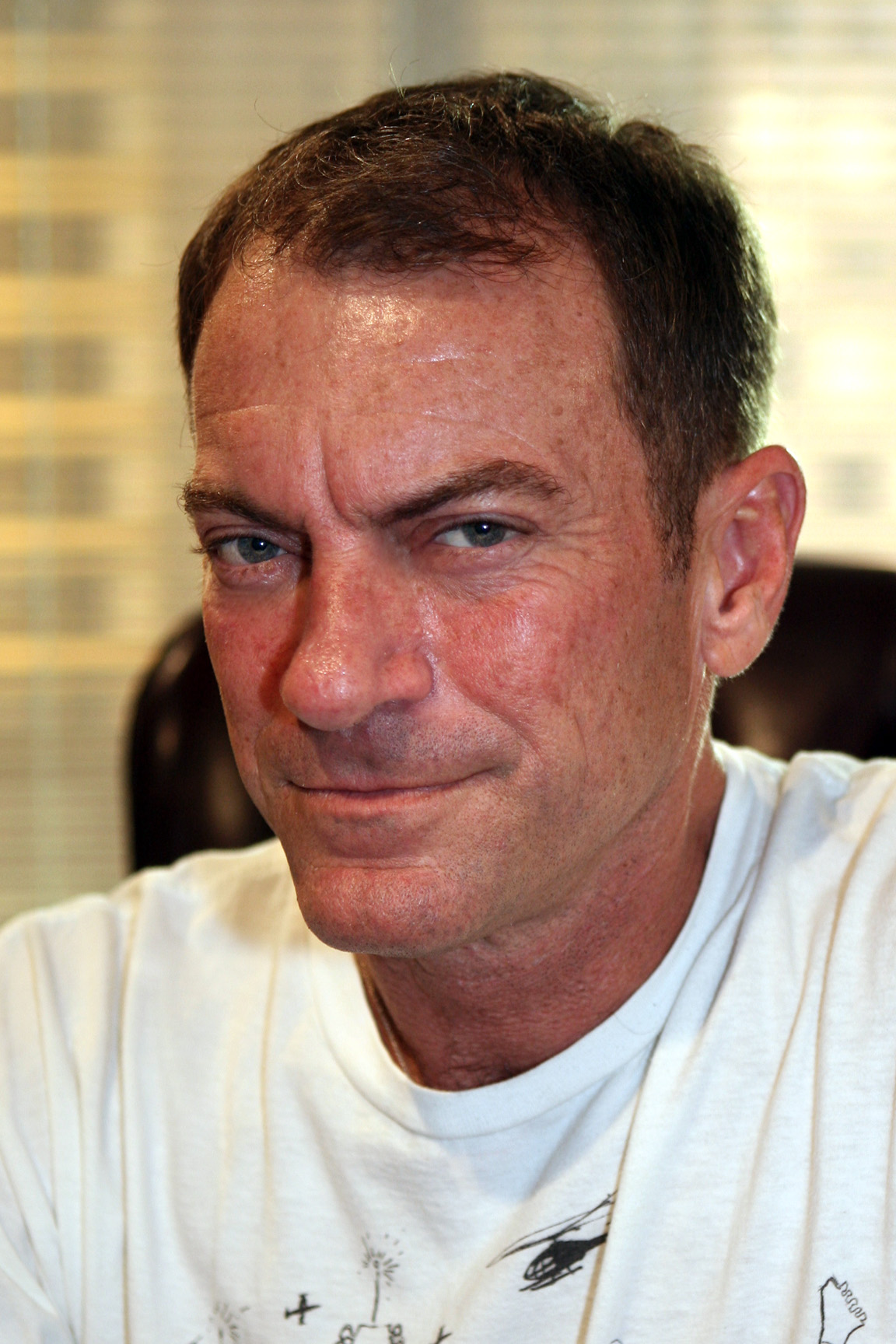
Randy Spears, Best Actor – Film winner

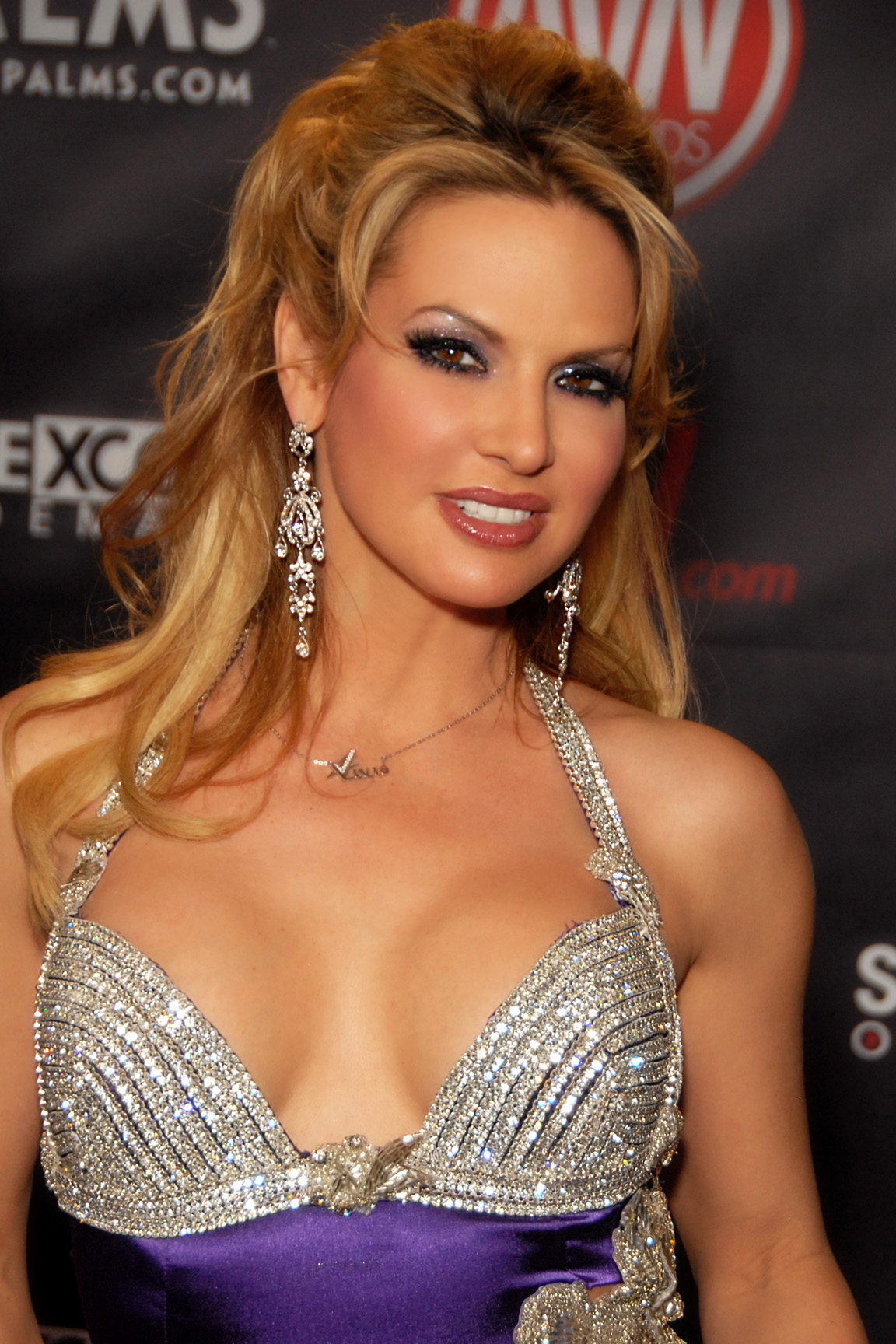
Savanna Samson, Best Actress – Film winner

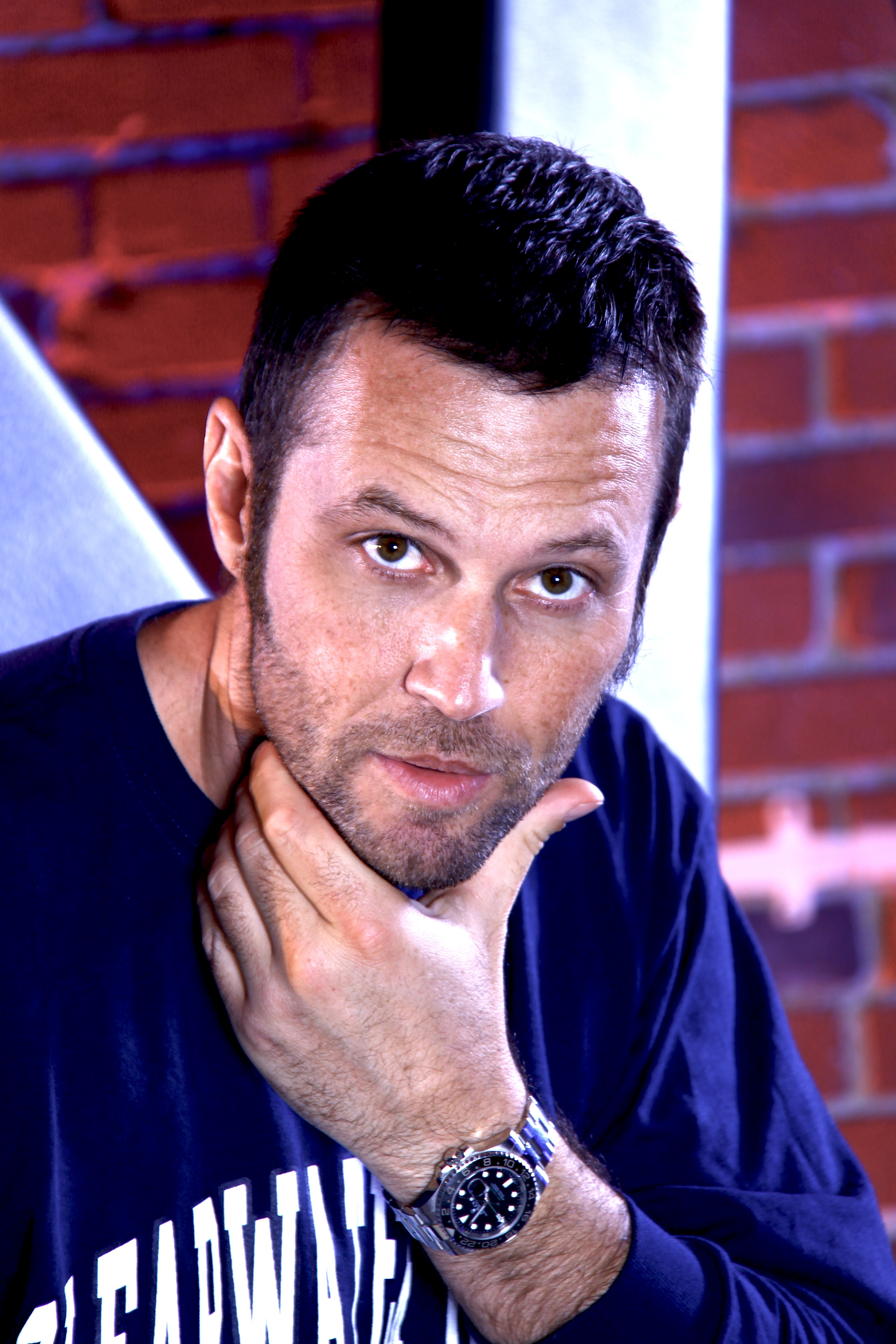
Axel Braun, Best Screenplay – Film winner

Winners are listed first, highlighted in boldface, and indicated with a double dagger (‡).

Best Film	Best Video Feature
**Heart of Darkness**‡; Compulsion; Heaven's Revenge; Looking In; Snakeskin; Sordid	**Beautiful**‡; **Rawhide**‡ (tie); Acid Dreams; Barbara Broadcast Too!; Improper Conduct; Little Runaway; Magic Sex; New Wave Hookers 7; No Limits; Not a Romance; Perverted Stories The Movie; Phoenix Rising 2; Riptide; Stud Hunters; Tricks; Young Sluts Inc. 12
Best DVD	Best New Starlet
**The Fashionistas**‡; America XXX; Asia Noir 2; Barbara Broadcast Too!; Hercules; I Dream of Jenna; Magic Sex; No Limits; Paradise Lost; Perfect; Rawhide; Rush; Space Nuts; Sunset Stripped	**Stormy**‡; Ashley Blue; Mary Carey; Cindy Crawford; Daisy; Alaura Eden; Jesse Jane; Kaylani Lei; Mercedez; Ander Page; Lauren Phoenix; Crystal Ray; Rachel Rotten; Simone; Bella-Marie Wolf
Male Performer of the Year	Female Performer of the Year
**Michael Stefano**‡; Jay Ashley; T. T. Boy; Erik Everhard; Brandon Iron; Julian; Nick Manning; Mr. Pete; Randy Spears; Steven St. Croix; Lexington Steele; Evan Stone; Mark Wood	**Ashley Blue**‡; Sunrise Adams; Belladonna; Jessica Darlin; Olivia Del Rio; Jewel De'Nyle; Bridgette Kerkove; Devinn Lane; Ashley Long; Carmen Luvana; Gina Lynn; Monique; Taylor Rain; Savanna Samson; Aurora Snow
Best Actor—Film	Best Actress—Film
**Randy Spears, Heart of Darkness**‡; Dale DaBone, Sordid; Joel Lawrence, Mirror Image; Kurt Lockwood, Compulsion; Rafe, Snakeskin; Steven St. Croix, Heaven; Tony Tedeschi, So I Married a Porn Star	**Savanna Samson, Looking In**‡; Cassidey, Sordid; Dasha, Heaven's Revenge; Maya Divine, Virtual Love; Ashley Long, Compulsion
Best Actor—Video	Best Actress—Video
**Evan Stone, Space Nuts**‡; Brad Armstrong, Not a Romance; Barrett Blade, No Limits; Tyce Bune, The Arrangement; Dillon Day, Phoenix Rising 2; Eric Masterson, Perfection; Herschel Savage, Roommate From Hell; Dick Smothers Jr., Bad Influence; Randy Spears, The Assignment; Steven St. Croix, Improper Conduct	**Julia Ann, Beautiful**‡; Ashley Blue, Girlvert 4; Chloe, Barbara Broadcast Too!; Chloe Dior, Riptide; Devinn Lane, Improper Conduct; Kaylani Lei, Angel X; Carmen Luvana, Rawhide; Ginger Lynn, Sunset Stripped; AnnMarie, Babes Illustrated 13; Savanna Samson, Good Time Girl; Alexandra Silk, Stud Hunters; Sydnee Steele, Lost & Found; Stormy, Not A Romance; Sunset Thomas, Truck Stop Trixie
Best Supporting Actor—Film	Best Supporting Actress—Film
**Steven St. Croix, Looking In**‡; Mr. Bigg, Compulsion; Dillon Day, Perfect; Steve Hatcher, Mirror Image; Eric Masterson, Virtual Love; Eric Price, Sordid	**Dru Berrymore, Heart of Darkness**‡; Sunrise Adams, Heart of Darkness; Julie Meadows, Mirror Image; Ava Vincent, Heart of Darkness
Best Director—Film	Best Director—Video
**Paul Thomas, Heart of Darkness**‡; Andrew Blake, Hard Edge; Axel Braun, Compulsion; Michael Raven, Heaven; Ruger Tyler, Snakeskin	**Michael Raven, Beautiful**‡; Nic Andrews, No Limits; Brad Armstrong, Improper Conduct; Nic Cramer, Phoenix Rising 2; Veronica Hart, Barbara Broadcast Too!; Chi Chi La Rue, Woman Under Glass; Cash Markman, Perfection; Jonathan Morgan, Space Nuts; Michael Ninn, Acid Dreams; Antonio Passolini, New Wave Hookers 7; Jim Powers, Rob Rotten, Little Runaway; Candida Royalle, Stud Hunters; Kat Slater, Young Sluts, Inc. 12; Nicholas Steele, Rawhide; Thomas Zupko, Opera
Best Sex Comedy	Best Gonzo Release
**Space Nuts**‡; Beat the Devil; Carmen Goes to College 2; Don't Tell Mommy; Girlvert 4; Gonza; It’s Cumming; La Femme Nikita Denise 2; Lost Heinie; Lube Job; Mary Carey Rules 2; Sex For Sale	**Flesh Hunter 5**‡; Ass Cleavage; Crack Her Jack; Double Parked; Hot Bods and Tail Pipe 28; International Tushy; Jack's Playground 2; Just Over Eighteen 5; Multiple P.O.V.; No Cum Dodging Allowed; Runaway Butts 6; Shane's World 32: Campus Invasion; Terrible Teens; The Voyeur 24; World Sex Tour 27
Best Ethnic-Themed Video—Black	Top Selling Title of the Year
**Hustlaz: Diary of a Pimp**‡; 6 Black Sticks 1 White Trick; Anal Divas in Latex; Black Reign 2; Booty Central 2; Chasing the Big Ones! 16; Francesca Lé Has a Negro Problem; Interracial Love Stories; Little White Chicks, Big Black Monster Dicks 17; Monique's Sexoholics; My Baby Got Back 30; Once You Go Black... You Never Go Back!; Orgy World: Brown & Round 2; Pussyman’s Black Bad Girls 14; Women of Color 4	**Hustlaz: Diary of a Pimp**‡
**Hustlaz: Diary of a Pimp**‡; 6 Black Sticks 1 White Trick; Anal Divas in Latex; Black Reign 2; Booty Central 2; Chasing the Big Ones! 16; Francesca Lé Has a Negro Problem; Interracial Love Stories; Little White Chicks, Big Black Monster Dicks 17; Monique's Sexoholics; My Baby Got Back 30; Once You Go Black... You Never Go Back!; Orgy World: Brown & Round 2; Pussyman’s Black Bad Girls 14; Women of Color 4	Top Renting Title of the Year
**Hustlaz: Diary of a Pimp**‡; 6 Black Sticks 1 White Trick; Anal Divas in Latex; Black Reign 2; Booty Central 2; Chasing the Big Ones! 16; Francesca Lé Has a Negro Problem; Interracial Love Stories; Little White Chicks, Big Black Monster Dicks 17; Monique's Sexoholics; My Baby Got Back 30; Once You Go Black... You Never Go Back!; Orgy World: Brown & Round 2; Pussyman’s Black Bad Girls 14; Women of Color 4	**The Fashionistas**‡
Best Couples Sex Scene—Film	Best Oral Sex Scene—Film
**Ashley Long, Kurt Lockwood, Compulsion**‡; Faith Adams, Julian, Hard Edge; Sunrise Adams, Randy Spears, Heart of Darkness; Crystal Carter, Randy Spears, Heart of Darkness; Avy Scott, Steven St. Croix, Heaven; Savanna Samson, Dale DaBone, Looking In; Taylor St. Claire, Steven St. Croix, Looking In; Mercedez, Tony Tedeschi, So I Married a Porn Star; Cassidey, Dale DaBone, Sordid	**Sunrise Adams, Randy Spears, Heart of Darkness**‡; Ava Vincent, Avy Scott, Kurt Lockwood, Compulsion; Dru Berrymore, Randy Spears, Heart of Darkness; Mercedez, Steven French, So I Married a Porn Star; Cassidey, T. J. Cummings, Sordid
Best Couples Sex Scene—Video	Best Oral Sex Scene—Video
**Belladonna, Nacho Vidal, Back 2 Evil**‡; Mercedes Ashley, Steve Holmes, Acid Dreams; Cytherea, Mark Ashley, Barely Legal 40; Julia Ann, Eric Masterson, Beautiful; Ryan Conner, Mark Ashley, Buttman's Bend Over Babes 6; Bella-Marie Wolf, Lexington Steele, Chasing the Big Ones 17; Simone, Nacho Vidal, Erotica XXX 3; Nicole Sheridan, Voodoo, Fetish: The Dream Scape; Naudia Nyce, Michael Stefano, Fresh New Faces; Natalia Wood, Manuel Ferrara, Gonzomania; Ashley Moore, Jay Ashley, Mason's Dirty Trixxx 2; Obsession, Toni Ribas, Monique's Sexaholics; August, Mandingo, Once You Go Black... You Never Go Back!; Philly, T. T. Boy, Spanish Fly Pussy Search 9; Sabrine Maui, Jules Jordan, Trained Teens 2	**Nevaeh Ashton, Felicia Fox, Benjamin Brat, Jake Malone, Chris Mountain, Tony Sexton, Tyler Wood, Heavy Handfuls 3**‡; Belladonna, Nacho Vidal, Back 2 Evil; Trinity, Friday, Jon Dough, Blow Me Sandwich 2; Simone, Nacho Vidal, Erotica XXX 3; Elizabeth, Nikke, Eye Contact 22; Sabrine Maui, Anthony Hardwood, Rick Masters, Tyler Wood, Francesca Lé’s Cum Swallowing Whores; Promise, Mark Cummings, Mr. Pete, Marty Romano, Gag Factor 10; Lola, Marty Romano, Perfection; Aurora Snow, Pat Myne, Jay Ashley, Pop; Lezley Zen, Austin O'Riley, Brandon Iron, Brian Surewood, Throat Gaggers 3; Wendy James, Jules Jordan, Trained Teens 3
Best All-Girl Sex Scene—Video	Best Three-Way Sex Scene—Video
**Jessica Darlin, Brandi Lyons, Lana Moore, Hollie Stevens, Flick Shagwell, Ashley Blue, Crystal Ray, The Violation of Jessica Darlin**‡; AnnMarie, Red Heaven, Ramona Luv, Babes Illustrated 13; Jewel De'Nyle, Bella-Marie Wolf, Babes in Pornland: Bubble Butt Babes; Fujiko Kano, Loni, Buffy Malibu's Nasty Girls 28; Carmen Luvana, AnnMarie, Carmen Goes To College 2; Gen Padova, Felix Vicious, Double Booked; Ashley Blue, Jessica Darlin, Girlvert 3; Dee, Holly Hollywood, Mia Smiles, Ice D’Angelo, Hustlaz: Diary of a Pimp; Bridgette Kerkove, Devinn Lane, Improper Conduct; Jenna Haze, Monique Alexander, Britney Foster, Jane Millionaire; Misty Rain, Silvia Saint, Venus, Misty Rain's Worldwide Sex 9; Jenna Jameson, Carmen Luvana, My Plaything: Jenna Jameson 2; Loni, Kimmy Kahn, No Man's Land: Asian Edition 4; Kylie Wilde, Holly Hollywood, Total Exposure; Aria, Shyla Stylez, When The Boyz Are Away, The Girlz Will Play 8	**Jessica Darlin, Jules Jordan, Brian Pumper, Weapons of Ass Destruction 2**‡; Brooke Ballentyne, Ben English, Steve Holmes, 2 Dicks in 1 Chick 2; Julie Night, Anna Nova, Mr. Pete, Ass Stretchers; Lucy Lee, Mark Anthony, Justin Slayer, Chasing the Big Ones 16; Julie Night, Ashley Blue, Trent Tesoro, Girlvert 2; Bella-Marie Wolf, Daisy, Mark Ashley, Hot Bods & Tail Pipe 26; Alaura Eden, Rio, Steven St. Croix, International Tushy; Sativa, Olivia O'Lovely, Lexington Steele, Initiations 12; Belladonna, Dee, Billy Glide, Latin Amore; Leila De Santos, Manuel Ferrara, Mr. Marcus, Lingerie; Fiona Cheeks, Cassie, Craig Moore, Mason's Dirty Trixxx 2; Julie Night, Manuel Ferrara, Steve Holmes, Mason's Dirty Trixxx 2; Belladonna, Tyce Bune, Joel Lawrence, New Wave Hookers 7; Kara, Ben English, Steve Hooper, Sex with Young Girls; Kelli Tyler, Malaysia, T. T. Boy, The Voyeur 23

=== Additional Award Winners ===
These awards were announced, but not presented, in two pre-recorded winners-only segments during the event. Trophies were given to the recipients off-stage:

- Best All-Girl Feature: Babes Illustrated 13
- Best All-Girl Series: No Man's Land
- Best All-Girl Sex Scene—Film: Dru Berrymore, Teanna Kai, Snakeskin
- Best All-Sex DVD: Flesh Hunter 4
- Best All-Sex Film: Hard Edge
- Best All-Sex Video: Fetish: The Dream Scape
- Best Alternative Video: Interviewing Jenna
- Best Amateur Series: Homegrown Video
- Best Amateur Tape: NYC Underground: Manhattan Girls
- Best Anal Sex Scene—Video: Gisselle, Katsumi, Michael Stefano, Multiple P.O.V.
- Best Anal-Themed Feature: Ass Worship 4
- Best Anal-Themed Series: Ass Worship
- Best Art Direction—Film: Andrew Blake, Hard Edge
- Best Art Direction—Video: Laurent Sky, Fetish: The Dream Scape
- Best Cinematography: Andrew Blake, Hard Edge
- Best Classic DVD: Insatiable, i-candy Entertainment
- Best Continuing Video Series: Girlvert
- Best Director, Non-Feature: Laurent Sky, Fetish: The Dream Scape
- Best Director, Foreign Release: Gazzman, The Scottish Loveknot
- Best DVD Extras: Space Nuts
- Best DVD Menus: Space Nuts
- Best DVD Packaging: Rawhide
- Best Editing—Film: Andrew Blake, Hard Edge
- Best Editing—Video: Alexander Craig, Antonio Passolini New Wave Hookers 7
- Best Ethnic-Themed Series: Chasin' the Big Ones
- Best Ethnic-Themed Video—Asian: Asia Noir 2
- Best Ethnic-Themed Video—Latin: Spanish Fly Pussy Search
- Best Foot Fetish Release: Barefoot Confidential 25
- Best Foreign All-Sex Release: Euroglam: Nikki Blonde
- Best Foreign All-Sex Series: Euroglam
- Best Foreign Feature: The Scottish Loveknot
- Best Gonzo Series: Service Animals
- Best Group Sex Scene—Film: Dru Berrymore, AnneMarie, Taylor St. Claire, Savanna Samson, Dale DaBone, Mickey G., Steven St. Croix, Looking In
- Best Group Sex Scene—Video: Ashley Long, Julie Night, Nacho Vidal, Manuel Ferrera, Back 2 Evil
- Best High-Definition Production: Rawhide
- Best Interactive DVD: My Plaything: Jenna Jameson 2
- Best Male Newcomer: Ben English
- Best Marketing Website: EvilAngel.com
- Best Music: Doug Scott, Allen Rene, Opera
- Best Non-Sex Performance: Allen Rene, Opera
- Best Oral-Themed Feature: Feeding Frenzy 2
- Best Oral-Themed Series: Gag Factor
- Best Overall Marketing Campaign—Company Image: Vivid Entertainment Group
- Best Overall Marketing Campaign—Individual Project: Mary Carey Campaign, Kick Ass Pictures
- Best Pro-Am Release: Breakin Em In 5
- Best Pro-Am Series: Breakin Em In
- Best Retail Website: AdultDVDEmpire.com
- Best Screenplay—Film: Axel Braun, Compulsion
- Best Screenplay—Video: George Kaplan, Michael Raven, Beautiful
- Best Sex Scene in a Foreign-Shot Production: Katsumi, Steve Holmes, Katsumi's Affair
- Best Solo Sex Scene: Brooke Ballentyne, Screaming Orgasms 11
- Best Special Effects: Dick Roundtree, Chokko Calisto, MV Effects, Space Nuts
- Best Specialty Big Bust Release: Heavy Handfuls 2
- Best Specialty BD & SM Release: Debbie Does Fem-Dom 3
- Best Specialty Release—Other Genre: Chunky on the Fourth of July
- Best Specialty Spanking Release: Spanked Toilet Whores
- Best Supporting Actor—Video: Randy Spears, Space Nuts
- Best Supporting Actress—Video: Brooke Ballentyne, Rawhide
- Best Tease Performance: Michelle Wild, Crack Her Jack
- Best Transsexual Release: She-Male Domination Nation
- Best VHS Box Cover Concept: Angel X, Wicked Pictures
- Best VHS Packaging: Euroglam: Wanda Curtis, Ninn Worx/Pure Play
- Best Videography: Nicholas Steele, Rawhide
- Best Vignette Tape: Mason's Dirty Trixxx 2
- Best Vignette Series: Barely Legal
- Female Foreign Performer of the Year: Mandy Bright
- Male Foreign Performer of the Year: Manuel Ferrera
- Most Outrageous Sex Scene: Julie Night, Maggie Star, Mr. Pete in "Love in an Abbatoir," Perverted Stories The Movie
- Transsexual Performer of the Year: Vaniity

=== Honorary AVN Awards ===
==== Reuben Sturman Award ====
- None given this year

==== Hall of Fame ====
AVN Hall of Fame inductees for 2004 were: Julia Ann, Brad Armstrong, Kim Christy, Don Fernando, Max Hardcore, Houston, Johnny Keyes, Jim Malibu, Rhonda Jo Petty, Alicia Rio, Misty Rain, Barry Wood

=== Multiple nominations and awards ===
The following releases received the most nominations.

Nominations	Movie
15	Rawhide
14	Heart of Darkness
13	Compulsion
13	Space Nuts
12	Beautiful
10	Hard Edge
10	Hustlaz: Diary of a Pimp
10	Looking In
10	No Limits
9	Acid Dreams
9	Fetish: The Dream Scape
9	Improper Conduct
9	Sordid

The following 17 releases received multiple awards:

Awards	Movie
6	Space Nuts
5	Heart of Darkness
5	Rawhide
4	Beautiful
4	Hard Edge
3	Fetish: The Dream Scape
3	Looking In
2	Ass Worship 4
2	Back 2 Evil
2	Breakin Em In 5
2	Compulsion
2	Euroglam: Nikki Blonde
2	Euroglam: Wanda Curtis
2	The Fashionistas
2	Hustlaz: Diary of a Pimp
2	Opera
2	The Scottish Loveknot

== Presenters and performers ==
The following individuals, listed in order of appearance, presented awards or performed musical numbers or comedy.

=== Presenters (in order of appearance) ===
Name(s)	Role
Nick Manning; Aria; Tawny Roberts	Presenters of the awards for Best Couples Sex Scene—Video, Best Supporting Actor—Film and Best Oral Sex Scene—Video
T. T. Boy; Amber Michaels; Anais	Presenters of the awards for Best All-Girl Sex Scene—Video and Best Gonzo Tape
Dyanna Lauren; Daisy; Aurora Snow	Presenters of the awards for Best Three-Way Sex Scene and Best Ethnic-Themed Video—Black
Jessica Drake; Dolorian; Julian St. Jox	Presenters of the awards for Best Couples Sex Scene—Film and Best DVD
Paul Fishbein; Nina Hartley; Monique	Presenters of the awards for Top Renting Tape of 2003 and Top Selling Tape of 2003
Paul Fishbein; Nina Hartley; Monique	Presenters of the awards for Top Renting Tape of 2003 and Top Selling Tape of 2003
Jenna Jameson	Introduction of trophy girls Nautica Thorn and Serena South
Jesse Jane; Lee Stone; Carmen Luvana	Presenters of the awards for Best Oral Sex Scene—Film and Best Supporting Actress—Film
Ron Jeremy; Vanessa Blue; Krystal Steal	Presenters of the awards for Male Performer of the Year and Female Performer of the Year
Evan Stone; Tabitha Stevens	Presenters of the awards for Best Director—Video and Best Director—Film
Jenna Haze	Presenter of the award for Best New Starlet
Belladonna; Dick Smothers Jr.	Presenters of the awards for Best Actor—Video and Best Actress—Video
Ginger Lynn; Cherry Rain; Lexington Steele	Presenters of the awards for Best Actor—Film and Best Sex Comedy
Kaylani Lei; Nicole Sheridan; Voodoo	Presenters of the awards for Best Actress—Film and Best Video
Mary Carey; Mercedez; Randy Spears	Presenters of the award for Best Film

=== Performers ===
Name(s)	Role	Performed
Mark Stone and the AVN Orchestra	Musical Director/Associate Producer	Orchestral
Olympic Gardens dancers Club Sapphire dancers	Performers	Dancers on stage
The Tubes	Performers	Musical number, “Don’t Touch Me There”
Jim Norton	Performer	Standup comedy segment
Jenna Jameson; Randy Spears	Performers	Tips from the Stars: Facials
Tony Tedeschi; Nikita Denise	Performers	Tips from the Stars: Anal sex
September; Joey Ray	Performers	Tips from the Stars: Helpful styling tips
Lauren Phoenix; Steven St. Croix	Performers	Tips from the Stars: Faked pop shots
Mary Carey; Nick Manning	Performers	Tips from the Stars: Looking good in porn
Nicole Sheridan; Voodoo	Performers	Tips from the Stars: Blowjobs keep men happy
Evan Stone; Jessica Drake	Performers	Tips from the Stars: The 3 Ss: Spanking, Spitting and Suffocation
Lil Jon; Ying Yang Twins	Performers	Musical number, “Get Low”

== Ceremony information ==
AVN created five new categories for the 2004 awards show: Best Amateur Tape, Best Amateur Series, Best Marketing Website — Production Company, Best Retail Website and Best Transsexual Performer.

A few years earlier, AVN had changed its Best Amateur Tape and Best Amateur Series Awards categories to Best Pro-Am or Amateur Tape and Best Pro-Am or Amateur Series. Amateur productions and pro-am productions now will be split into separate categories with professionals shooting or performing in the pro-am categories but not the strictly amateur categories. The Best Marketing Website — Production Company category is for free websites "strictly devoted to marketing adult product", and the Best Retail Website category is for non-pay sites selling adult products. Best Transsexual Performer was created because until now, the only award recognizing the transsexual genre was the Best Transsexual Tape, which recognized directors more than performers.

Besides being recorded for March broadcast on Playboy TV, a DVD of the awards show was also issued by Hustler.

=== Performance of year's movies ===
Hustlaz: Diary of a Pimp was announced as the adult movie industry's top selling movie and The Fashionistas was the top renting movie of the previous year.

=== Critical reviews ===
High Society magazine viewed the show and its surrounding AVN Adult Entertainment Expo favourably: "AEE, and the accompanying AVN Awards, is a hell of a lot of fun, but we're kind of glad it only happens once a year. That many breast implants, tattoos, piercings and diva-like attitudes in one building, at one time, is a little much, even for us."

== See also ==
- AVN Award
- AVN Best New Starlet Award
- AVN Award for Male Performer of the Year
- AVN Award for Male Foreign Performer of the Year
- AVN Female Performer of the Year Award
- List of members of the AVN Hall of Fame
- 2004 GayVN Awards
