= Snoop Dogg's Doggystyle =

2001 film by Michael Martin

- DVD cover
- Directed by: Michael Martin
- Written by: Snoop Dogg
- Produced by: Larry Flynt
- Cinematography: Drew Rose
- Music by: Snoop Dogg
- Distributed by: Hustler (225633)
- Release date: January 31, 2001
- Running time: 86.5 min
- Language: English

Snoop Dogg's Doggystyle is a mixed hardcore pornography and hip-hop music video featuring the music of rapper Snoop Dogg, presented by the rapper himself. It was released in 2001. It was the first hardcore video ever listed on the Billboard music video sales chart. Because of its huge success, it started a trend where rappers are put into the mainstream of the porn industry by hosting X-rated films. Many films of the genre followed, starring Necro, Mystikal, Too Short, Ice-T and Yukmouth. It also allowed Hustler to expand its boundaries by launching new subsidiaries for their recently formed fashion line and CD label. The scenes were shot at Snoop Dogg's house in Claremont, California. Snoop Dogg himself however, does not appear nude or perform any explicit acts.

== Credits ==
Porn performers include:

- Obsession
- Mark Anthony
- India
- Tony Eveready
- Charlie Angel
- Jade Marcela
- Bronze
- Cuba Demoan
- Farrah
- Kaire
- Anna Malle
- Mr. Marcus
- Jack Napier

Video dancers include:

- Carla Harvey
- Lenore
- Petro
- Moet
- Essence
- Caramel
- Diva Blue
- Alize

Snoop Dogg's entourage includes:

- Xzibit
- Rappin' 4-Tay
- Tray Deee
- Goldie Loc
- Nate Dogg
- Soopafly
- DJ Jam
- Uncle Junebug
- Tha Locs

== Featured songs ==
Several songs from Snoop Dogg Presents Tha Eastsidaz (2000):

- "Pussy Sells", "Dogghouse", "G'd Up", "Now We Lay 'Em Down", "Tha G In Deee", "Give It 2 'Em Dogg" and "Tha Eastsidaz"

Other songs:

- "In Love with a Thug" and "Don't Tell" from No Limit Top Dogg (1999)
- "Brake Fluid (Biiittch Pump Yo Brakes)" from Tha Last Meal (2000)

Four exclusive songs:

- "Let's Roll" - Goldie Loc feat. Snoop Dogg (samples "Billie Jean" by Michael Jackson)
- "One More Switch"
- "Fatal Attraction"
- "Nigga Sayin' Hi"

== Awards ==
Year	Award	Result
2002	AVN Award for Best Music	Won
2002	AVN Award for Top Selling Tape of 2001	Won

== Charts ==
Chart	Peak Position/ (peak weeks)	Weeks spent
Adult sales	# 1 (2)	??
Billboard music video sales	# 21 (1)	3

== See also ==
- Snoop Dogg's Hustlaz: Diary of a Pimp
- Snoop Dogg filmography
