= Snoop Dogg's Hustlaz: Diary of a Pimp =

2002 porn and hip hop music video

- DVD cover
- Directed by: Snoop Dogg (Under the pseudonym Snoop Scorsese)
- Produced by: Patti Rhodes-Lincoln; Snoop Dogg
- Music by: Snoop Dogg
- Distributed by: LFP Distribution
- Release date: 2002
- Running time: 101 minutes
- Language: English

Snoop Dogg's Hustlaz: Diary of a Pimp is a mixed hardcore pornography and hip hop music video featuring the music of rapper Snoop Dogg, produced by Hustler Video. The video was also directed, co-produced and presented by Snoop, although he does not feature in any sex scenes. In the film's credits, Snoop is listed under the moniker "Snoop Scorsese". The film was released in 2002, a year after Snoop Dogg set the trend of mixed hip hop porn films with Snoop Dogg's Doggystyle.

The film features Snoop hosting a party with more than 40 porn stars. Snoop plays the role of a pimp, who dresses in outlandish outfits, and persuades a prudish journalist to become one of his girls. The film became the top-selling U.S. pornographic film of 2003.

== Credits ==
- Snoop Dogg as The Doggfather (non-sex role)
- Chelsea Blue as Lana Gammons
- Mark Ashley (non-sex role)
- Ashley Long
- Billy Banks
- Chaze
- Cashmere
- Flick Shagwell
- Holly Hollywood
- Honney Bunny
- Jade Hsu
- Nyomi Marcella
- Tony Eveready
- Nikki Fairchild
- Manuel Ferrara
- Steve Hatcher
- Dominico
- India
- Darren James
- Leo
- Monique
- Sin Nye
- Skyy Jolie
- Billy D
- Mr. Marcus
- Brian Pumper
- Rafe (non-sex role)
- Marty Romano
- Taylor St. Clair
- Valentino
- John West
- Jason Zupalo
- Ice La Fox
- Kiwi
- Shyla Stylez
- Dee
- Brittany Skye
- Mia Smiles
- Sabrine Maui (non-sex role)

== Controversy ==
In the same year as the release of Hustlaz: Diary of a Pimp, Snoop Dogg also acted as the host in the Girls Gone Wild show Doggy Style, where he films a Mardi Gras party. After the release of the DVD, two women featured in the film accused Snoop Dogg and other members of the production team of coercing them into participating. Snoop settled his part of the lawsuit and formally severed his professional relationship with Girls Gone Wild, citing the lack of racial diversity (namely the overrepresentation of white women) in their videos. In response, he suggested producing an alternative version of the show featuring Black and Latina women more prominently, although the plan for a more racially inclusive pornographic special never came to fruition.

== Awards and nominations - partial listing ==
- 2004 AVN Award winner - Top Selling Release of the Year
- 2004 AVN Award winner - Best Ethnic-Themed Release - Black
- 2004 AVN Award double nominee – Best Non-Sex Performance, Film or Video for Chelsea Blue and, separately, for Snoop Dogg
- 2004 AVN Award nominee – Best All-Girl Sex Scene, Video for Mia Smiles, Dee, Holly Hollywood & Ice D’Angelo

== See also ==
- Snoop Dogg filmography
