= Cindy Starfall =

Vietnamese pornographic film actress and model (b. 1989 or 1990)

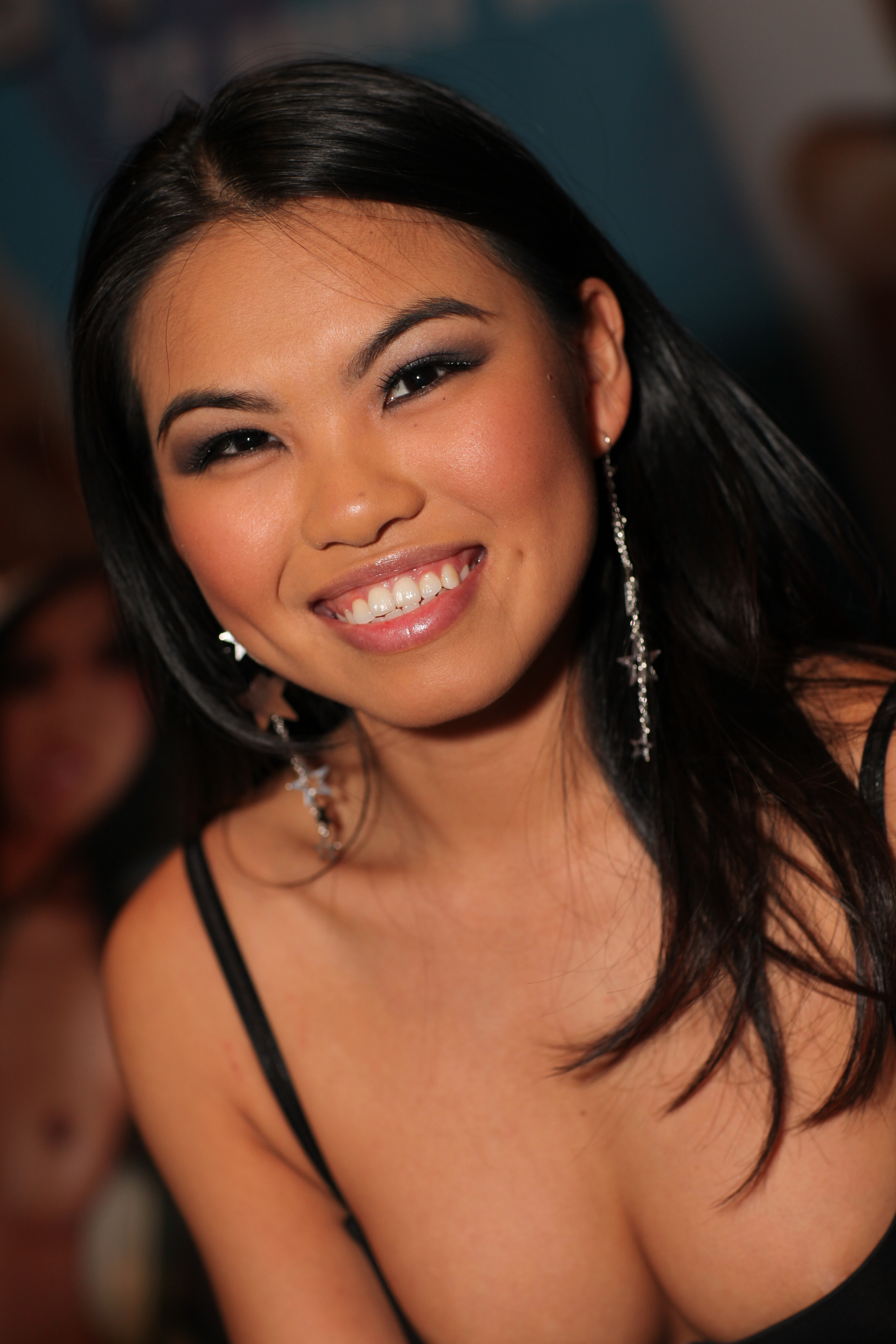
- Starfall in 2013, at the 30th AVN Awards
- Born: 1989 or 1990 (age 35–36); Vietnam
- Occupations: Pornographic film actress; model
- Years active: 2012–present

Cindy Starfall (born 1989 or 1990) is a Vietnamese-American pornographic film actress and OnlyFans model.

== Life and career ==
Starfall was born in Vietnam. She has said that she grew up in a wealthy but controlling family and that she was raised by her aunt. In 2004, she immigrated to the United States. Upon arrival, she joined an all-girls Catholic school in Oregon and moved in with a friend. Starfall obtained a degree in business marketing from a college in California and has said that she worked several jobs to fund this.

Starfall began camming in 2011, aged 21, while working a corporate job, which she left after an employer confronted her about her side hustle. Her stage name was taken from Cindy Crawford and the name of an Orange County street she could see from her corporate job's office building. She shot her first hardcore scene after meeting a Hustler executive in March 2012 at a swingers club she frequented. Starfall took part in an October 2013 live discussion about condoms in porn on the HuffPost's website. In a 2016 piece about "weird things" pornstar fans have done, she said she once received a box of pears from an admirer who hoped for a date.

In 2018, she hosted the 2018 Urban X Awards and appeared alongside pornographic film actress Lana Violet in a 2018 interview and strip trivia segment for KLAQ. She started modelling and performing on OnlyFans in 2020, from which she made around US$20,000 a month, and launched a femdom website in 2022. She has said that her family does not support her career.
