= Domonique Simone =

American pornographic actress and director (born 1971)

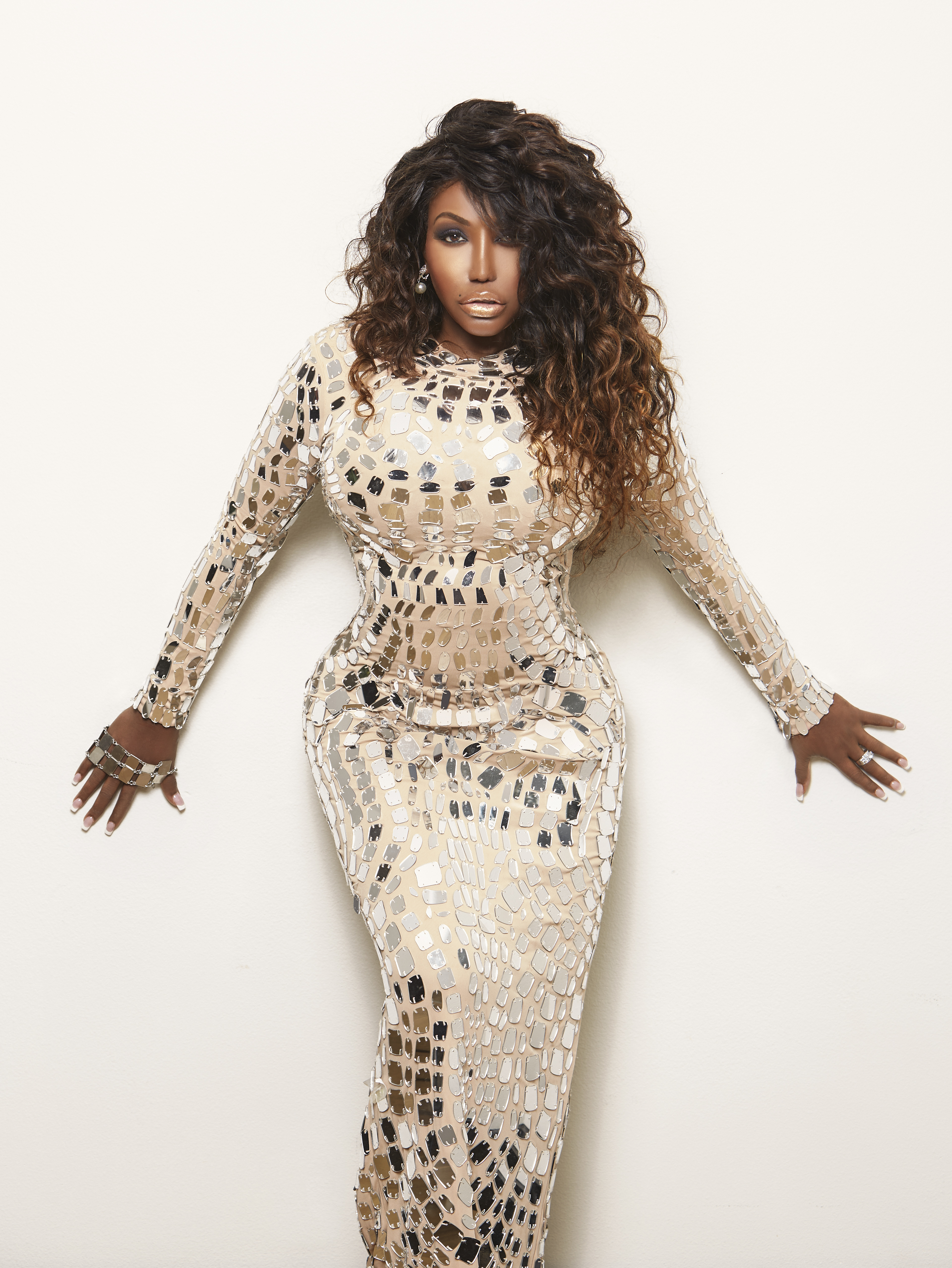
- Domonique Simone in 2023
- Born: Deirdre Morrow; June 18, 1971 (age 55); Valdosta, Georgia, U.S.
- Occupation: Actress
- Height: 5 ft 5 in (1.65 m)
- Children: 4

Domonique Simone (born Deirdre Morrow; June 18, 1971) is a retired American actress who was prominent in the adult film industry. Best known for her works in the 1990s, she starred in over 200 films, earning herself a place in the AVN Hall of Fame, Urban X Hall of Fame, and XRCO Hall of Fame. in 2007. Since retiring, she has lived a very private life, primarily focusing on her role as a mother to her four children. Simone is also notable for her engagements outside the adult film industry, including appearances in music videos, mainstream film, and her active presence on social media platforms.

== Early life and career ==
Simone won a scholarship to the Fashion Institute of Design and Merchandising at the age of 17. The following year, in 1989, she ventured into the adult film industry after answering an ad for figure modeling, leading to shoots for pornographic magazines like Hustler and Players.

== Media Appearances ==
In addition to her prolific adult film career, Simone had a scene in the 1994 film Fear of a Black Hat and featured in music videos including Snoop Dogg's Murder was the Case, Brian McKnight's Keep It on the Down Low, and Montell Jordan's Something 4 the Honeyz.

== Post-Career Life ==
After retirement, Simone transitioned into a quiet life, committed to raising her four children in Beverly Hills, California, remaining very private. Simone occasionally engages with fans through interviews, photo shoots, and media appearances. She is particularly active on social media platforms such as her official Twitter page and her official Instagram page.

== Memoir ==
Simone is set to release her memoir, A Star is Porn, in July 2023. The book promises to delve into her experiences in and outside the adult film industry.
