= Snoop Dogg filmography =

Snoop Dogg film discography
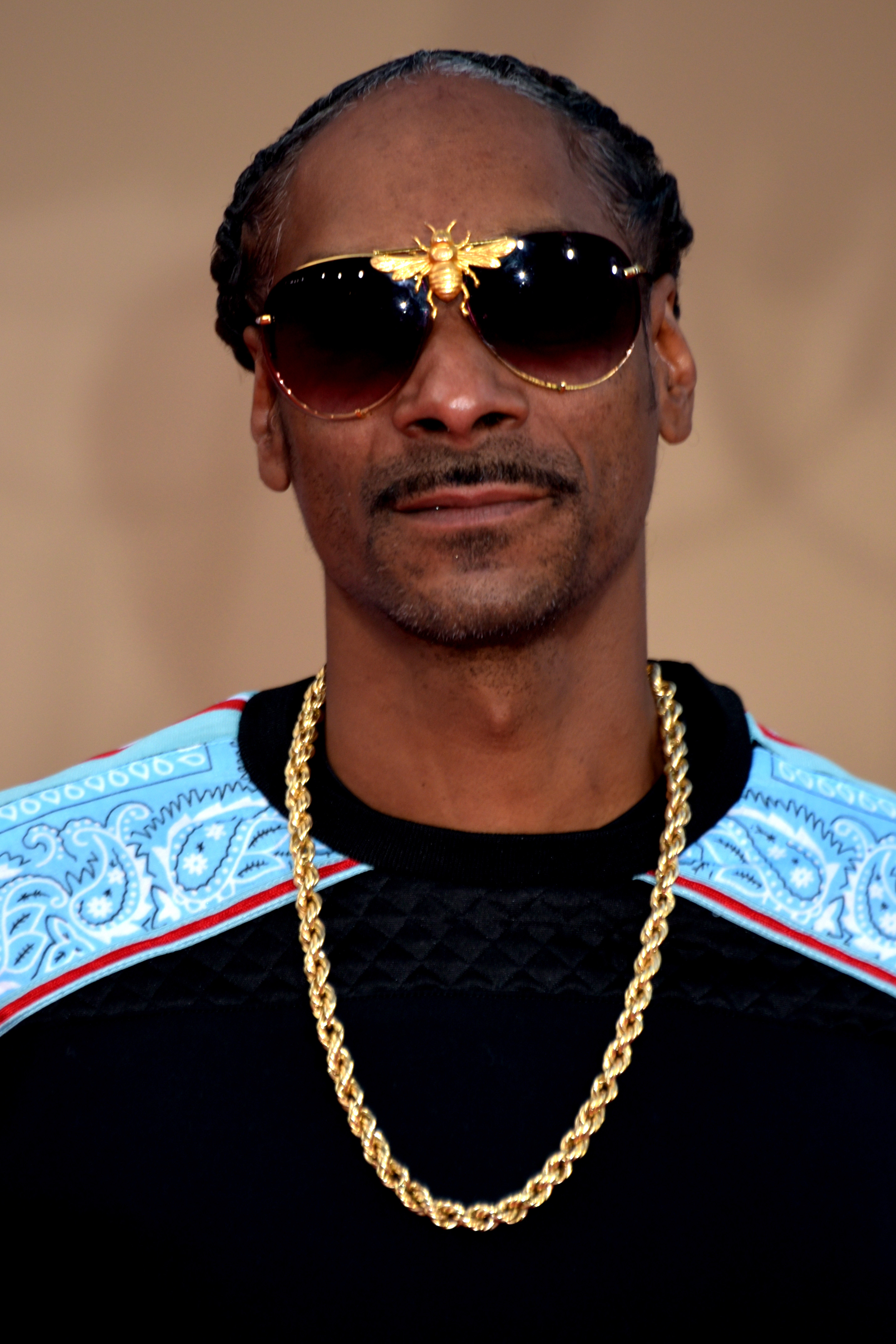
- Music videos: 101
- Films: 87
- TV series appearances: 38

Snoop Dogg has appeared in various video games, music videos, television series, and film appearances such as the Academy Award-winning drama Training Day and the critically acclaimed cable television series The L Word. He also has appeared in documentaries on hip-hop music and other subjects, and is the subject of a 2012 documentary, Reincarnated, on his transformation into "Snoop Lion", a reggae artist.

== Film ==
Year	Title	Role	Notes
1995	Murder Was the Case	Silky Slim	Short film
1995	The Show	Himself	Documentary
1998	Half Baked	Scavenger Smoker	Uncredited cameo
1998	Caught Up	Kool Kitty Kat	
1998	I Got the Hook-Up	Pool Player / Bar Patron	Uncredited
1998	Ride	Mente	
1998	Documentary of Shawn	Brian	Documentary
1998	Da Game of Life	Smooth	Direct-to-video
1998	MP da Last Don	Bar Patron	Direct-to-video
1999	Urban Menace	Preacher Caleb	
1999	Whiteboyz	Himself	Uncredited cameo
1999	Hot Boyz	Christoper "C-Dawg" Ferrell	
2000	The Wrecking Crew	Dra-Man	
2000	Up in Smoke Tour	Himself	Concert film
2000	Tha EastSidaz	Killa Pop	Also writer
2001	Baby Boy	Rodney	
2001	Training Day	Blue	
2001	Bones	Jimmy Bones	
2001	The Wash	Dee Loc	Also executive producer
2001	Welcome to Death Row	Himself	Documentary
2001	Volcano High	Song Hak-rim	English-dubbed version
2001	Snoop Dogg's Doggystyle	Himself	Also writer
2002	Tupac Shakur: Thug Angel: The Life of an Outlaw	Himself	Documentary
2002	It's Black Entertainment	Himself	Documentary
2002	Snoop Dogg's Hustlaz: Diary of a Pimp	The Doggfather	Also director and producer
2002	Girls Gone Wild: Doggy Style	Himself	Also contributed music; direct-to-video
2002	Sex and the Studio 1	Himself	Direct-to-video
2003	Old School	Himself	
2003	Pauly Shore Is Dead	Himself	Mockumentary; cameo
2003	Malibu's Most Wanted	Ronnie Rizzat	Voice role
2003	The Real Cancun	Himself	
2003	Beef	Himself	Documentary
2003	Tupac: Resurrection	Himself	Documentary
2004	Starsky & Hutch	Huggy Bear Brown	
2004	Soul Plane	Captain Antoine Mack	
2004	Beef II	Himself	Documentary
2004	Snoop Dogg's Buckwild Bus Tour	Himself	Concert film
2005	The L.A. Riot Spectacular	The Narrator	
2005	Boss'n Up	Corde Christopher	Also executive producer
2005	Racing Stripes	Lightning	Voice role
2005	Letter to the President	The Narrator	Direct-to-video
2006	The Tenants	Willie Spearmint	
2006	Hood of Horror	Devon	Also executive producer
2006	Arthur and the Minimoys	Max	Voice role
2006	DPG Eulogy	Himself	Direct-to-video
2006	Rap Sheet: Hip-hop and the Cops	Himself	Documentary
2007	Beef IV	Himself	Documentary
2007	In Prison My Whole Life	Himself	Documentary
2008	Singh Is Kinng	Himself	Cameo
2009	Down for Life	Mr. Hightower	Also executive producer
2009	Falling Up	Raul	Direct-to-video
2009	Brüno	Himself	Mockumentary; cameo
2009	Arthur and the Revenge of Maltazard	Max	Voice role
2009	Futurama: Into the Wild Green Yonder	Himself	Voice role; direct-to-video
2010	Malice N Wonderland	Malice Bigg	Short film
2010	Mics On Fire	Himself	Documentary
2010	Straight Outta L.A.	Himself	Documentary
2011	The Big Bang	Puss	
2011	Justin Bieber: Never Say Never	Himself	Concert film
2012	Mac & Devin Go to High School	Mac Johnson	Also story
2013	Reincarnated	Himself	Documentary
2013	Scary Movie 5	Ja'Marcus	
2013	Odnoklassniki.ru: naCLICKay udachu	Himself	Cameo
2013	Turbo	Smoove Move	Voice role
2014	The Independent Game	Himself	
2014	The Distortion of Sound	Himself	Documentary
2015	Pitch Perfect 2	Himself	Cameo
2015	High School 2	Mac	
2015	Snow on the Bluff 2	Dred	Short film
2015	Mouse Trap	Mario	
2016	Popstar: Never Stop Never Stopping	Himself	Mockumentary; cameo
2016	Meet the Blacks	Todd	
2016	What Are the Chances?	Himself	
2016	Unbelievable!!!!!	Major LeGrande Bushe	Also executive producer
2017	Grow House	Himself	
2017	Coolaid: The Movie	Himself	Also director; voice
2018	Future World	Big Daddy Love Lord	
2018	Don't Get Caught	Himself	Direct-to-video
2019	The Beach Bum	Lingerie "Rie"	
2019	Dolemite Is My Name	Roj	
2019	The Addams Family	Cousin Itt	Voice role
2019	Trouble	Snoop	Voice role
2019	The Black Godfather	Himself	Documentary
2020	The SpongeBob Movie: Sponge on the Run	The Gambler	
2021	The House Next Door: Meet the Blacks 2	Himself	
2021	DOMINO: Battle of the Bones	DR. DMF	
2021	Blood Pageant	Himself	
2021	The Addams Family 2	Cousin Itt	Voice role
2021	When Claude Got Shot	Himself	Also executive producer; documentary
2022	Good Mourning	The Joint	
2022	Day Shift	Big John Elliott	
2023	House Party	Himself	Cameo
2024	The Underdoggs	Jaycen	Also executive producer
2024	The Garfield Movie	Maurice	Voice role
2024	1992	—N/a	Also executive producer
2024	Piece by Piece	Himself	Voice role
2026	Paw Patrol: The Dino Movie	Dave	Voice role
2026	Madden	Himself	
2027	Snoop †	—N/a	Also producer
TBA	All-Star Weekend †	TBA	Completed

== Television ==
Year	Title	Role	Notes
1994	Martin	Himself	Episode: "No Love Lost"
1994	Saturday Night Live	Himself	Musical guest; Episode: "Helen Hunt / Snoop Doggy Dogg"
1994–2004	Howard Stern	Himself	9 episodes
1996	MTV Video Music Awards	Himself	Presenter
1997	Saturday Night Live	Himself	Musical guest; Episode: "David Alan Grier / Snoop Doggy Dogg"
1997	The Steve Harvey Show	Himself	Episode: "I Do, I Don't"
1999	Saturday Night Live	Himself	Musical guest; Episode: "Norm Macdonald / Dr. Dre featuring Snoop Dogg & Eminem"
2000	The PJs	Infamous QT	Voice role; Episode: "Ghetto Superstars"
2001	Just Shoot Me!	Himself	Episode: "Finch in the Dogg House"
2001	King of the Hill	Alabaster Jones	Voice role; Episode: "Ho, Yeah!"
2002–2003	Doggy Fizzle Televizzle	Host	8 episodes
2003	Crank Yankers	Himself	Voice role; Episode: "Snoop Dogg & Kevin Nealon"
2003	Playmakers	Edwin 'Big E' Harris	2 episodes
2004	The Bernie Mac Show	Calvin	Episode: "Big Brother"
2004	Chappelle's Show	Dangle / Himself	Voice role; Episode: "Kneehigh Park & Making Da Band"
2004	Las Vegas	Himself	Episode: "Two of a Kind"
2004	The L Word	Slim Daddy	2 episodes
2004	Saturday Night Live	Himself	Host; Episode: "Snoop Dogg / Avril Lavigne"
2006	Weeds	Himself	Episode: "MILF Money"
2006	Where My Dogs At?	Himself	Episode: "Woofie Loves Snoop"
2007	Entourage	Himself	Episode: "The Dream Team"
2007	Monk	Murderuss	Episode: "Mr. Monk and the Rapper"
2007	Robot Chicken	Himself, Godzilla	Voice role; Episode: "Squaw Bury Shortcake"
2007–2008	The Boondocks	Macktastic / Himself	Voice role; 4 episodes
2007–2009	Snoop Dogg's Father Hood	Himself	19 episodes
2008	One Life to Live	Himself	Episode: "May 8, 2008"
2009	Brothers	Kenny Trainor	2 episodes
2009	Dogg After Dark	Himself	2 episodes
2009	Futurama	Himself	Voice role; Episode: "Into the Wild Green Yonder: Part 4"
2009	Who Wants to Be a Millionaire?	Himself	Part of the show's 10th Anniversary Celebration; Episode: "Leslie/Donald/Richard/Chris"
2009	Xavier: Renegade Angel	Per Se	Voice role; Episode: "Free Range Manibalism"
2010	Big Time Rush	Himself	Episode: "Big Time Christmas"
2010	Freaknik: The Musical	Gang Member #1	Voice role; Television special
2010	Gigantic	Himself	Episode: "An Awesome Night of Awesomeness"
2011	90210	Himself	Episode: "Blue Naomi"
2011	The Cleveland Show	Himself	Voice role; Episode: "Back to Cool"
2012	Black Dynamite	Leroy Van Nuys	Voice role; Episode: "Panic on the Player's Ball Express or That's Influenza Sucka!"
2013	The League	Himself (Taco's (Jon Lajoie) Eskimo Brother)	Episode: "Chalupa vs. The Cutlet"
2014	Love & Hip Hop: Atlanta	Himself	2 episodes
2015	Empire	Himself	Episode: "Die but Once"
2015	Sanjay and Craig	Street Dogg	Voice role; Episode: "Street Dogg"
2015	The Voice	Himself	Performer; Season 8
2016	Mike Tyson Mysteries	Himself	Voice role; Episode: "Unsolved Situations"
2016–2017	Trailer Park Boys	Himself	5 episodes
2017	Henry Danger	Himself	Episode: "Danger Games"
2017	The Simpsons	Himself	Voice role; Episode: "The Great Phatsby"
2018	Sugar	Himself	Episode: "Snoop Dogg surprises a young father who is working to turn his life around."
2018	Ask the StoryBots	Operating System	Voice role; Episode: "How Do Computers Work?"
2018	New Looney Tunes	Himself	Voice role; Episode: "Hip Hop Hare"
2019	Game Shakers	Himself	3 episodes
2019	Law & Order: Special Victims Unit	R.B. Banks	Episode: "Diss"
2019	American Dad!	Tommy Tokes	Voice role; Episode: "Jeff and The Dank Ass Weed Factory"
2019	Mission Bila Houdoud	Himself	Television special
2020	F Is for Family	Rev. Sugar Squires	Voice role; 3 episodes
2020	Utopia Falls	The Archive	Voice role; 6 episodes
2020	Martha Knows Best	Himself	Episode: "Container Gardens"
2020	Mariah Carey's Magical Christmas Special	Himself	Television special
2021	Mythic Quest	Himself	Episode: "Breaking Brad"
2021	Hip Hop Uncovered	Himself	Docuseries
2021	Live in Front of a Studio Audience	Vernon	Episode: "Diff'rent Strokes Privacy Willis"
2021	The Voice	Himself	Mega Mentor & Performer; Season 20 (3 episodes)
2021-2023	BMF	Pastor Swift	8 episodes
2022	American Song Contest	Himself	8 episodes
2022	So Dumb It's Criminal: Hosted by Snoop Dogg	Himself	Television special
2022	Snoop Dogg's F*Cn Around Comedy Special	Himself	Television special
2022–2023	Doggyland	Bow Wizzle	54 episodes
2023	Dear Mama	Himself	Voice role; 4 episodes
2023	Lopez vs Lopez	Calvin	Episode: "Lopez vs Last Call"
2024–2025	The Voice	Himself	Coach; Season 26 and Season 28

== Video games ==
Year	Title	Role	Notes
2003	True Crime: Streets of LA	Himself	Playable character
2004	Def Jam: Fight for NY	Crow	Playable character
2006	Def Jam Fight for NY: The Takeover	Crow	Playable character
2012	Tekken Tag Tournament 2	Himself	Likeness
2013	Way of the Dogg	Himself	Likeness
2013	Call of Duty: Ghosts	Himself	Voice role; multiplayer announcer (DLC)
2013	Turbo: Super Stunt Squad	Smoove Move	Playable character
2015	Family Guy: The Quest For Stuff	Himself	Playable character
2019	Madden NFL 20	Himself	Playable character
2019	NHL 20	Himself	Occasional announcer
2020	Madden NFL 21	Himself	Playable character
2020	Madden NFL 21: Face of the Franchise: Rise to Game	Himself	Playable character
2021	Grand Theft Auto Online	Himself	Guest radio DJ; voice only
2022	Call of Duty: Vanguard	Himself	Playable character (DLC); voice and likeness
2022	Call of Duty: Mobile	Himself	Playable character (DLC); voice and likeness
2023	Call of Duty: Modern Warfare II	Himself	Playable character (DLC); voice and likeness
2024	Fortnite	Himself	Playable character (DLC); voice and likeness
2026	Hitman: World of Assassination	Dr. Cyrus Cane	Elusive target (DLC); voice and likeness
2027	Stranger Than Heaven	Orpheus	Voice and likeness

== Guest appearances ==
Year	Title	Role	Notes
2005	The Andy Milonakis Show	Himself	Episodio: "#1.2"
2006	Katt Williams: The Pimp Chronicles Pt.1	Himself	Opening sequence film
2007	Wild 'n Out	Himself	Episode: "Jordin Sparks/Snoop Dogg"
2012	Epic Rap Battles of History	Moses	Episode: "Moses vs. Santa Claus"
2021	AEW Dynamite	Himself	Episode: "AEW DYNAMITE NEW YEAR'S SMASH NIGHT 1 REVIEW - Wednesday Night War - Bullet Club REUNITE! Jon Moxley Is BACK! Hikaru Shida Defeats Abadon! Snoop Dogg Gets His First AEW Win?!"
2022	Arsenio! Live	Himself	Episode: "Snoop Dogg/Katt Williams/Quinta Brunson/Chinedu Unaka"

== Music videos ==
=== As lead artist ===
List of music videos as lead artist, with directors, showing year released
Title	Year	Director(s)
"Deep Cover (187)" (with Dr. Dre)	1992	none
"What's My Name?"	1993	Fab 5 Freddy
"Gin and Juice"	1994	Dr. Dre
"Murder Was the Case"	1994	Dr. Dre
"Doggy Dogg World" (featuring Tha Dogg Pound and The Dramatics)	1994	Dr. Dre, Ricky Harris
"Snoop's Upside Ya Head" (featuring Charlie Wilson)	1996	none
"Wanted: Dead or Alive" (with2Pac)	1997	none
"Vapors"	1997	Paul Hunter
"Doggfather"	1997	Joseph Kahn
"Still a G Thang"	1998	Michael Martin
"Ride On" (with Kurupt)	1998	R.A.S.H.I.D.I.
"G Bedtime Stories"	1999	Gee Bee
"Woof" (featuring Mystikal and Fiend)	1999	none
"Bitch Please" (featuring Xzibit and Nate Dogg)	1999	Dr. Dre, Phillip Atwell
"Buck 'Em" (featuring Sticky Fingaz)	2000	J.J. Martin
"Snoop Dogg (What's My Name Pt. 2)"	2000	Chris Robinson
"Lay Low" (featuring Master P, Nate Dogg, Butch Cassidy and Tha Eastsidaz)	2001	Hype Williams
"Loosen' Control" (featuring Soopafly and Butch Cassidy)	2001	Jeremy Rall
"Just a Baby Boy" (with Mr. Tan and Tyrese Gibson)	2001	Brent Hedgecock
"Dogg Named Snoop"	2001	Kennedy
"From tha Chuuuch to da Palace" (featuring Pharrell Williams)	2002	Diane Martel
"Undercova Funk (Give Up the Funk)" (with Bootsy Collins)	2002	none
"Pimp Slapp'd"	2002	none
"Stoplight"	2002	none
"Beautiful" (featuring Pharrell and Charlie Wilson)	2003	Chris Robinson
"Drop It Like It's Hot" (featuring Pharrell)	2004	Paul Hunter
"Let's Get Blown" (featuring Pharrell)	2004	Paul Hunter
"Signs" (featuring Justin Timberlake and Charlie Wilson)	2005	Paul Hunter
"Ups & Downs"	2005	Anthony Mandler
"Vato" (featuring B-Real)	2006	Phillip Atwell
"That's That Shit" (featuring R. Kelly)	2006	Benny Boom
"Boss' Life" (featuring Nate Dogg)	2006	Anthony Mandler
"A Bitch I Knew"	2006	Snoop Dogg, Terrance C. Ball
"Crazy" (featuring Nate Dogg)	2006	Snoop Dogg, Terrance C. Ball
"Gangbangin' 101" (featuring The Game)	2006	Snoop Dogg, Terrance C. Ball
"10 Lil' Crips"	2006	Snoop Dogg, Terrance C. Ball
"Candy (Drippin' Like Water)" (featuring E-40, MC Eiht, Goldie Loc, Daz Dillinger and Kurupt)	2006	Dylan "Pook" Brown
"Hood of Horror"	2006	none
"Go Girl"	2007	Calvin Broadus
"Sensual Seduction"	2007	Melina
"Neva Have 2 Worry" (featuring Uncle Chucc)	2008	Rik Cordero
"Life of da Party" (featuring Too Short and Mistah F.A.B.)	2008	Dylan "Pook" Brown
"My Medicine" (featuring Willie Nelson)	2008	Dylan "Pook" Brown
"Those Gurlz"	2008	Dylan "Pook" Brown
"Staxxx in My Jeans"	2009	none
"Snoop State of Mind" (featuring Alicia Keys)	2009	Dah Dah
"That's tha Homie"	2009	Dah Dah
"Shoot Em' Up"	2009	Dah Dah
"Gangsta Luv" (featuring The-Dream)	2009	Paul Hunter
"I Wanna Rock"	2009	Erick Peyton
"Pronto" (featuring Soulja Boy)	2009	Erik White
"Protocol"	2009	Dah Dah
"Tell Me What You Want"	2009	Dah Dah
"Cancun" (featuring Kurupt)	2010	Dah Dah
"We da West" / "Program" / "West Side Rollin'"	2010	Dah Dah
"Upside Down" (featuring Nipsey Hussle and Problem)	2010	Dah Dah
"I Wanna Rock" (The Kings G-Mix) (featuring Jay-Z)	2010	Dah Dah
"That Tree" (featuring Kid Cudi)	2010	Erick Peyton, VisualCreatures
"Oh Sookie"	2010	Dylan "Pook" Brown
"Luv Drunk" (featuring The-Dream)	2010	none
"New Year's Eve" (featuring Marty James)	2010	Dylan "Pook" Brown
"Wet"	2011	Dylan "Pook" Brown
"That Good" (with Wiz Khalifa)	2011	none
"El Lay" (featuring Marty James)	2011	none
"Purp & Yellow" (featuring Game)	2011	Matt Alonzo
"I Don't Need No Bitch" (featuring Devin the Dude and Kobe)	2011	none
"Boom" (featuring T-Pain)	2011	Dylan "Pook" Brown
"My Own Way" (featuring Mr. Porter)	2011	none
"My Fucn House" (featuring Young Jeezy and E-40)	2011	Dah Dah
"Gangbang Rookie" (featuring Pilot)	2011	none
"Take U Home" (featuring Too Short, Kokane and Daz Dillinger)	2011	none
"This Weed Iz Mine" (featuring Wiz Khalifa)	2011	none
"Stoner's Anthem"	2011	Dah Dah
"Young, Wild & Free" (with Wiz Khalifa, featuring Bruno Mars)	2011	Dylan "Pook" Brown
"Si Al Sayed" (featuring Tamer Hosny and Snoop Dogg)	2012	Tarik Freitekh
"La La La" Slow Motion (With J. Pearl, Lee M., Iyaz). Eli Roth Claudio Zagarini.	2012	Eli Roth
"Lighters Up" (featuring Mavado and Popcaan)	2012	Andy Capper
"No Guns Allowed" (featuring Drake and Cori B)	2013	Jessy Terrero
"Ashtrays and Heartbreaks" (featuring Miley Cyrus)	2013	P.R. Brown
"Torn Apart" (featuring Rita Ora)	2013	Willie T, Ted Chung
"Stoner's Anthem"	2013	Snoop Dogg
"Let the Bass Go"	2013	Benny Boom
"Let Me Explain (Theme)" (with Erick Sermon and Method Man featuring RL)	2013	Snoop Dogg
"The Good Good" (featuring Iza Lanch)	2013	John Mazyack
"Faden Away" (with 7 Days of Funk)	2013	Henrey DeMaio
"Hit Da Pavement" (with 7 Days of Funk)	2013	Henrey DeMaio
"Smoke the Weed" (featuring Collie Buddz)	2013	John Mazyack
"Do My Thang" (with 7 Days of Funk)	2013	John Mazyack
"Happy Birthday Pt. 2" (featuring Poo Bear)	2013	Snoop Dogg
"Gangsta Don't Live That Long"	2013	Snoop Dogg
"We'll Miss You" (with Daz Dillinger)	2014	Snoop Dogg
"Peaches N Cream" (featuring Charlie Wilson)	2015	Aramis Israel and Hannah Lux Davis
"So Many Pros"	2015	Francois Rousselet
"California Roll" (featuring Stevie Wonder)	2015	Warren Fu
"Kush Ups" (featuring Wiz Khalifa)	2016	Dan Folger
"Point Seen Money Gone" (featuring Jeremih)	2016	Benny Boom
"Lavender (Nightfall Remix)" (featuring BadBadNotGood and Kaytranada)	2017	Jesse Wellens and James DeFina
"Mount Kushmore" (featuring Redman, Method Man and B-Real)	2017	Snoop Dogg
"Neva Left"	2017	D. Baker
"Go On" (featuring October London)	2017	Dah Dah
"Trash Bags" (featuring K Camp)	2017	John Mazyck
"My Last Name" (featuring October London)	2017	Marcella Cytrynowicz
"Moment I Feared" (featuring Rick Rock)	2017	Dah Dah
"Words Are Few" (featuring B. Slade)	2018	Snoop Dogg
"One More Day" (featuring Charlie Wilson)	2018	Snoop Dogg
"Blessing Me Again" (featuring Rance Allen)	2018	Snoop Dogg
"Cripn 4 Life" (with Dave East)	2018	D. Baker
"New Wave" (featuring Mali Music)	2018	Snoop Dogg
"I Wanna Thank Me" (featuring Marknoxx)	2019	Dah Dah
"Main Phone" (featuring Rick Rock & Stressmatic)	2019	Dah Dah
"So Misinformed" (featuring Slick Rick)	2019	Dah Dah
"I C Your Bullsh*t"	2020	Dah Dah
"CEO"	2021	D. Baker
"Roaches in My Ashtray" (featuring ProHoeZak)	2021	Guap City
"Say It Witcha Booty" (featuring ProHoeZak)	2021	Guap City
"Look Around" (featuring J Black)	2021	D. Baker
"Gang Signs" (featuring Mozzy)	2021	4 rAx
"Talk Da Sh*t to Me" (featuring Kokane)	2021	Snoop Dogg
"Say It Witcha Booty" (version 2) (featuring ProHoeZak)	2021	Guap City
"Big Subwoofer" (with Mount Westmore)	2021	Jwaaw Wellens and Sam Macaroni
"Go to War" (with Blxst)	2021	Snoop Dogg
"Murder Music" (with Benny the Butcher, Jadakiss and Busta Rhymes)	2021	Dah Dah
"Make Some Money" (with Fabolous and Dave East)	2021	Diane Martel
"No Smut on My Name" (featuring Battle Locco and Kokane)	2021	Peter Quinn
"Bad MF's" (with Mount Westmore)	2022	Marc Wood
"House I Built"	2022	Snoop Dogg
"Touch Away" (feat. October London)	2022	none
"Crip Ya Enthusiasm"	2022	Jesse Wellens &James Defina
"Free Game" (with Mount Westmore)	2022	Cam Busby
"I'm from 21st Street" (with DJ Drama featuring Stressmatic)	2023	Dah Dah
"Can U Dig That?" (with DJ Premier)	2024	Drew Morris

=== As featured artist ===
Name	Year	Artist(s)
Afro Puffs	1994	Lady of Rage
What Would U Do?	1994	Tha Dogg Pound
New York, New York	1995	Tha Dogg Pound
2 of Amerikaz' Most Wated	1996	2Pac
Never Leave Me Alone	1996	Nate Dogg
Only in California	1997	Mack 10, Ice Cube
Unify	1998	Kid Capri, Slick Rick
Come Get with Me	1998	Keith Sweat
We Be Puttin' It Down	1998	Bad Azz
Cali Chronic	1999	Harlem World
Still D.R.E.	1999	Dr. Dre
Game Don't Wait (Remix)	2000	Warren G, Nate Dogg, Xzibit
G'd Up	2000	Tha Eastsidaz, Butch Cassidy
Got Beef	2000	Eastsidaz, Jayo Felony
Bow Wow Wow	2000	Lil Bow Wow
Pleezbaleevit!	2000	Doggy's Angelz, Layzie Bone
Crybaby	2000	Mariah Carey
The Next Episode	2000	Dr. Dre, Nate Dogg
Tha Eastsidaz	2000	Eastsidaz
Dogghouse	2000	Eastsidaz, Rappin 4Tay
WW III	2001	Ruff Ryders, Scarface
You	2001	Lucy Pearl, Q Tip
I Luv It	2001	Eastsidaz
Pop Lockin'	2001	Silkk the Shocker, Goldie Loc
Wrong Idea	2001	Bad Azz
Welcome to Atlanta (Remix)	2002	Jermaine Dupri, Murphy Lee, Ludacris, P. Diddy
The Streets	2002	WC, Nate Dogg
Bigger Business	2002	Swizz Beatz, P. Diddy, Baby, Jadakiss, Cassidy
Holidae Inn	2003	Chingy, Ludacris
P.I.M.P. (Remix)	2003	50 Cent, G Unit
The Way I Am	2004	Knoc-Turn'al
"Groupie Luv"	2004	213
I Wanna Thank Ya	2004	Angie Stone
Why Cry	2005	Ooh Wee
Blackout	2005	Mashonda
Don't Stop	2005	Beanie Sigel
Real Soon	2005	DPGC
Say Somethin'	2006	Mariah Carey
Push My Buttons	2006	Pussycat Dolls
Keep Bouncin'	2006	Too Short, Will.i.am.
Gangsta Zone	2006	Daddy Yankee
Cali Iz Active	2006	Tha Dogg Pound
Gangsta Walk	2006	Coolio
Go to Church!	2006	Ice Cube, Lil Jon
I Wanna FUCK You!	2006	Akon
That Girl	2006	Pharrell
Speaker	2007	David Banner, Lil Wayne, Akon
Real Man	2007	Lexington Bridge
Vibe Pimpish	2007	Dogg Pound
Ghetto	2007	Kelly Rowland

=== Cameo appearances ===
- Mista Grimm's Indo Smoke as himself
- Jodeci's Feenin' as himself
- Tha Dogg Pound's Let's Play House as himself
- Danny Boy's Slip N Slide as himself
- LBC Crew's Beware of My Crew as himself
- Big Pun's Deep Cover '98 as himself.
- DJ Quik's You'z A Ganxta as himself.
- Mariah Carey's Heartbreaker (remix) as himself.
- Limp Bizkit's Break Stuff as himself.
- Kurupt's It's Over as himself.
- Sean Combs's Bad Boy for Life as himself.
- Nelly’s Pimp Juice as himself.
- Britney Spears' Outrageous as himself.
- Lil Scrappy's No Problem as himself.
- Korn's Twisted Transistor as Munky.
- Flo Rida's Good Feeling as himself.
- R. Kelly's Backyard Party as himself.
- Usher's Don't Waste My Time as himself.
- YG's Swag as himself
