= India (actress) =

American pornographic actress and rapper (born 1977)

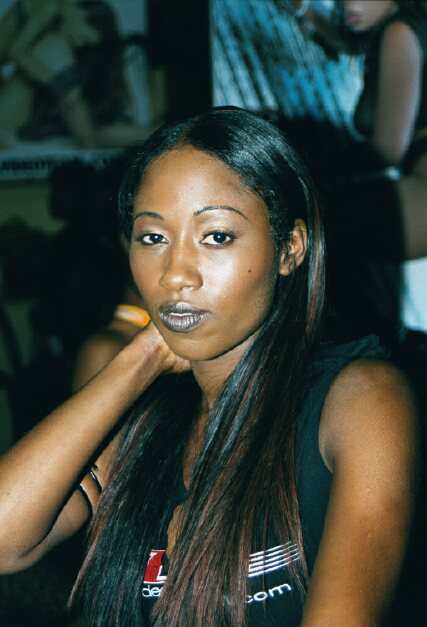
- India at the 2002 Adult Entertainment Expo
- Born: May 17, 1977 (age 49)
- Occupations: Pornographic actress; singer; rapper
- Height: 5 ft 8 in (1.73 m)
- Website: indiasplayhouse.com

India (born May 17, 1977) is a former pornographic actress, singer and rapper.

She began working as an adult actress in around 1998 and has since appeared in over 200 videos. For five years, she was an exclusive contract girl for the production company Video Team, and she has an exclusive sex toy line, manufactured by California Exotic Novelties.

India owns the record company Black Widow Entertainment, and in 2006, she released her debut solo album Role Play. She had previously been a member of several girl groups; her first album, Hi Naturally, was released in 1994 when she was in the group Harmony Innocents. In July 2002, she was profiled on VH1's All Access hip-hop/porn special. In 2004, her vocals featured in the movie Walking Tall, starring Dwayne Johnson.

== Awards and nominations ==
- 2000 AVN Award nominee – Best New Starlet
- 2004 AVN Award nominee – Most Outrageous Sex Scene – Hustlaz: Diary of a Pimp
- 2004 AVN Award nominee – Best Tease Performance – Hustlaz: Diary of a Pimp
- 2008 AVN Award nominee – Best Supporting Actress, Video – Afrodite Superstar
- 2011 Urban X Awards Hall of Fame
- 2022 AVN Hall of Fame
