= Marica Hase =

Japanese porn actress

- まりか
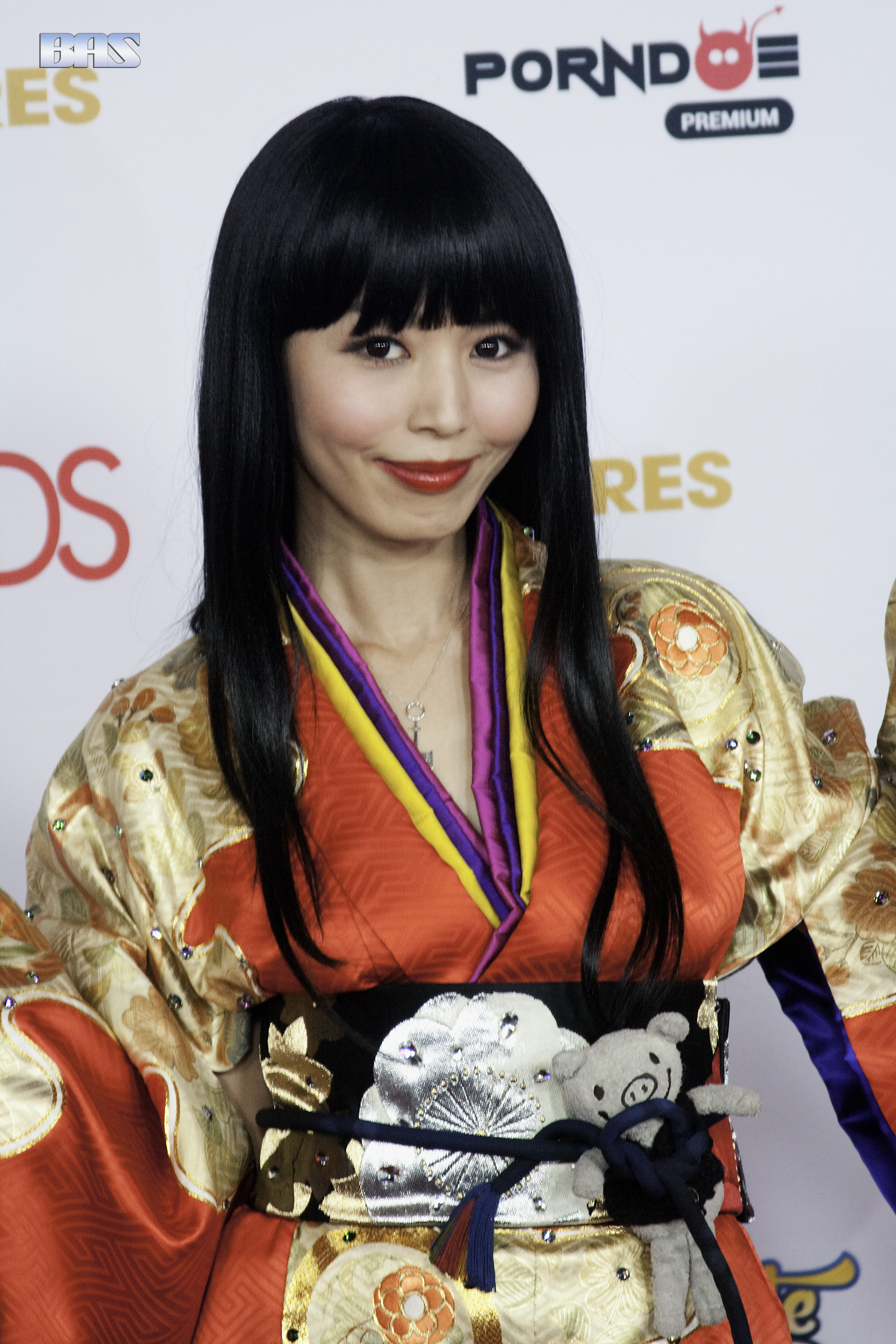
- Marica Hase at the AVN Awards 2016
- Born: September 26, 1981 (age 44); Tokyo, Japan
- Website: marica-hase.com

Marika Hase (Japanese: 長谷 真理香, Hepburn: Hase Marika), also known as Marica (まりか, Marika), is a Japanese porn actress, and Penthouse Pet. Starting her career as an erotic model in 2007, Hase began performing in adult videos (AV) in 2009 before moving to the United States in 2012. She appeared in more than 500 adult films and is one of the very few Japanese AV stars that have switched over to the American AV industry.

== Career ==
Hase was born on September 26, 1981 in Tokyo, Japan. She began her career as an erotic model, appearing in several nude DVDs, collaborating with other performers like Tanuki Roku and Go Arisue. During those days, she had already contacted major AV studios and teased of a potential adult film debut. As a gravure model, she was using the name Marika Hase (長谷 真理香, Hase Marica) and was renamed Marika (まりか, Marika) when she made her AV debut, but she eventually returned to using her last name, Hase. In September 2009, she won the sponsored award "Tinkle"（てぃんくる賞） at "1st SOD star Cinderella audition." and made her AV debut in December 2009, Actual Gravure Idol x AV Debut for the SOD create Studio.

She left SOD in May 2010 and moved to Japan Home Video's EROTICA series. She also started to perform with other AV companies like Moodyz and Cross. On June 17, 2011, she reported on her blog that she passed as the second member of the idol unit OFA21. In December 2011, she appeared in an edition of Nikkan Sports. During her Japanese AV career she appeared in more than 200 adult films (including omnibus and a re-edited versions) from various studios.

On March 31, 2012, she announced on her blog that she would continue her career in the United States. In January 2013, she was chosen as the Penthouse Pet of the Month. While Hase attempted to maintain a crossover career by performing in both Japanese and American adult films, by 2014 she started to fully transition into the American scene, performing with companies such as Brazzers, Evil Angel, Kink.com and Wicked Pictures. As of 2019, Hase appeared in more than 300 Western porn scenes and continues to be an active performer. In October 2019 she appeared as the cover girl in the monthly issue of Hustler.

== Personal life ==
In February 2019, Hase revealed that she was diagnosed with breast cancer in late 2018. She set up a GoFundMe campaign to raise US$50,000 to undergo a bilateral mastectomy and reconstruction at the City of Hope National Medical Center in Los Angeles County, California. The campaign also covered all related expenses, as she was out of work for four months. Hase said she donated any leftover funds to the medical center.

== Awards ==
- 2020 Urban X Hall of Fame
- 2022 AVN Award - Best Foursome/Orgy Sex Scene - Chaired
- 2025 Bazowie Award - Best Human/Adorable Critter Collaboration (Suidae Division)
- 2026 Bazowie Award - Best VR - The King of Fighters: Mai Shiranui
- 2026 Bazowie Award - Best Human/Adorable Critter Collaboration (Suidae Division)
- 2026 European Adult Legend Award
- 2026 Urban X Award - Pornstar Next Door
