= Players Magazine =

US softcore men's magazine

Players
- Editor: Wanda Coleman
- Editor: James Nazel
- Editor: Emory Holmes
- Categories: Men's magazines
- Frequency: Monthly
- Publisher: Players International Publications, Inc.
- Founder: Bentley Morriss and Ralph Weinstock
- Founded: 1973
- Final issue: 2005
- Country: United States
- Based in: Los Angeles, California
- Language: English

Players was an American monthly softcore men's magazine. It was often nicknamed "the black Playboy" for its attempt at providing the African-American public with a racy, yet elegant reading choice. Once new black-centric magazines came in to the fold, publications such as The Messenger, Opportunity, and The Crisis would regularly show and portray photographs and short descriptions of Black life in America, specifically Women, to enlighten the masses as both moral and aspirational figures. These images were originally to challenge racist stereotypes, but would turn it on its head to create a vision of empowerment. Players Magazine would come along, as it would take this narrative and flip it to a sexualized state, which would change the world of adult magazines. Players Magazine, amongst the others before it, attempted to end the narrative of ignorance towards Black life or the everyday representation of Black people.

== History ==
Players was published by Bentley Morriss and Ralph Weinstock, doing business as Players International Publications. Morris and Weinstock, who were both white, had a long experience in the realm of men's magazines as owners of Adam and Sir Knight. The pair also owned a paperback book business, Holloway House Publishing. While the company did release serious biographies, it made a large share of its money from sensationalist books about sex workers and alternative lifestyles.

When Holloway House struck gold with several accounts of the sex trade in the African-American underworld, in particular those by real life macks Iceberg Slim and Donald Goines, Morris and Weinstock realized the demand for mature ethnic entertainment. This prompted the creation of a series of novels starring Iceman, a fictional pimp turned vigilante patterned after Slim, and a brand new adult magazine called Players.

The cover girl for the inaugural November 1973 issue was former Playboy Italy Playmate and cover girl Zeudi Araya.

Players straddled the line between the mainstream aspirations of Playboy and the braggadocio associated with urban street cultures, with thinly veiled allusions to gold diggers and quick material gain. The magazine made no effort to hide its large inmate readership, featuring a letter from prison in virtually every reader's mail column.

Holloway House Publishing avoided both the East Coast literary establishment and Johnson Publishing Company by distributing their books in inner-city communities, prisons, and military bases across the country. Simultaneously, they were exploiting marginalized artists and writers to produce content for their company.

The first few issues were edited by then little known poet Wanda Coleman. She was replaced after six issues by Iceman author Joseph Nazel, whose books were frequently advertised in the magazine. Los Angeles-based journalist Emory Holmes II also had two stints as the head of the publication.

Influential media critic Donald Bogle was a contributor to Players. Cultural critic Stanley Crouch was the magazine's top music columnist and his protégé Wynton Marsalis was prominently featured in the magazine. Iceberg Slim himself penned short stories which would form the basis of the 1979 anthology Airtight Willie and Me, published by Holloway House. Georgia State Senator and future NAACP Chairman Julian Bond was another notable contributor to Players.

The magazine closed in 2005, and was survived by a handful of spin-offs.

== Featured Writers ==
Players featured a number of pieces by black writers whose work focused on the experiences of black Americans as well as relevant political themes. Black writers whose work as featured in Players includes: Amiri Baraka, Alex Haley, Julian Bond, Huey Newton, Stanley Crouch, Chester Himes, Donald Goines and Iceberg Slim.

== Cultural significance ==
=== Background ===
Black-owned media like magazines, newspapers, and other media have acted as ways for promoting "Black excellence, equality, social justice" and news in the Black community. Due to segregation and discrimination, there has always been the need to create "safe Black spaces" to produce content tailored to the Black community. Players Magazine is an example of a Black space created to allow the production of Black content in its appropriate outlet. It holds great significance due to its longevity compared to other Black newspapers and magazines. Historically, Black newspapers and magazines have not lasted nearly as long as Players Magazine has been.

=== Making Players Unique ===
One of the justifications for Players was representation of Blacks for the African American public. However, there are a significant number of Black publications, for example Ebony, with the same target audience. What made Players unique was its intended purpose. In the past Playboy was considered an erotic magazine that fulfilled the adult males fantasies about women. Today it is considered a way for black/ African American community to get a look into the newest fashion trends and significant cultural changes for the time. for Black people, it also featured information on trends in movies and music, politics, and Black culture. A magazine such as Ebony featured content on "black history, entertainment, business, health, occupations, personalities, and sports" (Glasrud) with a goal of inspiring Black people and showing models of success. Both publications featured uplifting content relevant to black people, and clothed cover models, but Players featured seductive images, sexual icons, a centerfold, and three-to-four page spreads. Ebony also released annual swimsuit issues but the pictures could hardly be considered racy.

=== Colorism in Players ===
The content of Players brings to mind Mireille Miller-Young's 1980's research on the adult entertainment industry A Taste for Brown Sugar primarily "Colorism and the Myth of Prohibition". She writes about colorism through its link to the antebellum era. At this time the "trade in black women as sexual slaves ... was known for prizing very light-skinned black women." They were valued for their proximity to whiteness but also fit stereotypes involving sexuality—being seen as exotic or sexually aggressive. Miller-Young also mentions another magazine marketed to black consumers, Jet, that highlighted primarily lighter-skinned models on its covers. This colorism blocks opportunities for the diversity found among black women to be seen as desirable and reinforces the politics within pornography and the sex media. While there are instances of Players magazine portraying colorist tendencies, for the most part, it was productive in showing the wide range of hair types, skin colors, and body types of black women, setting it apart from mainstream white sex media.

=== Change in Content Over Time ===
The creative direction that Players reached for in their content often changed. Whereas "by the mid-1970s, Holloway House Publishing and Players had developed an effective formula for publishing black material, Morriss and Weinstock created specific rules, dictating the kind of texts that could be published in Players. Stories about African American history, black politics, international black issues, or African American arts such as sculpture or painting were prohibited. In their minds the only marketable black material was 'authentic ghetto literature'." Players' formula grew so strict that it included explicit rules surrounding acceptable, publishable content. "[Players] could never publish any story about blacks in history ... No stories about the slave trade. No stories about emancipation. No stories about blacks in history at all ... no stories about Jamaica's Trenchtown, or South Africa, or apartheid ... You can do stories about music, but not about these arts that no one is interested in. Paintings, sculpture, and classical jazz ... No stories about politics". This strict policy on content later fell as Emory Holmes gained access to content as editor of Players and the direction focused on content relevant to the everyday life of black Americans, and away from the fantasy "pimp" model pushed by Weinstock and Morriss.

=== Media Representation ===
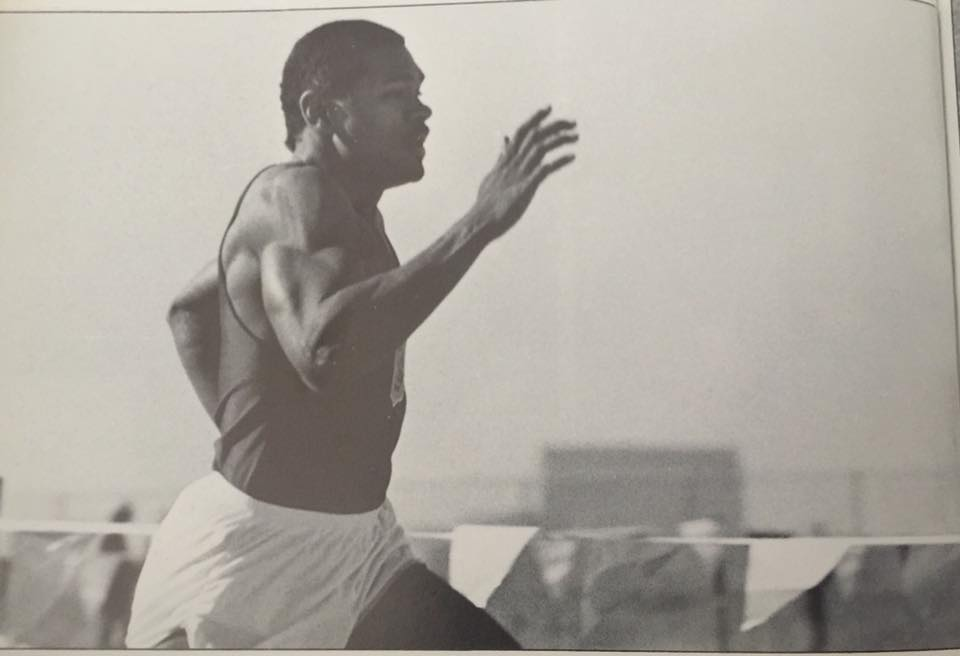
Black people in sports

Writers for Players magazine inspired hip-hop innovators like Nas, Tupac Shakur, and The Notorious B.I.G. In American culture, porn is a stimulus of a popular imagination stratified and, indeed, haunted, by race. These portrayals, reinforce negative stereotypes about black people. When the only representations audiences see of minority characters are negative, these portrayals manifest to society. These images influence how audiences view minorities. Minorities also face implications from this by internalizing these representations. Negative representations that are internalized are demoralizing and reduce self-esteem. These representations impact our expectations for characters in thinking about stereotypes, and the kinds of characters that we expect certain bodies to portray. According to Miller-Young, black women are undervalued in the porn industry. Some examples that manifest themselves in the porn industry, is the binary that exists for black women; you are either a Mammy non sexual, or the Jezebel, inherently available and hyper sexual. Black women are also disproportionately viewed as aggressive, domineering, and unfeminine. Whereas black men are depicted as animalistic and hyper masculine.

=== Hyper-sexuality of Black Women ===
According to book writer Marquita Gammage, when a simple Google search is done about the players magazine one can tell that most of the women on the cover's are Black women. Players magazine provides many cultural ideas for the Black community but at what cost to black women? The hyper-sexualization of Black women is not only prevalent in the Players magazine but has always been prevalent in media. The negative representation of Black Women have been shown through hip hop. Depictions like the "baby mama" or the "sex-crazed gold-digger" paints this picture of how Black Women are seen as easily accessible at a cost. She also says that because these views of Black Women are so easily influenced by media it is easy to take advantage of a Black Woman's image. Leading people to believe that they too can profit off of the Black Woman's image.

== Featured Models ==
=== Players' Definition of a Woman ===
Players' definition of a woman suitable to be featured often fluctuated. Where initially "Morriss and Weinstock had only three requirements for women to be featured in the magazine: the models had to look like they were eighteen years old, they had to have European features, and they had to have large breasts." Having been an editor in 1975, Emory Holmes returned to the Players staff as editor for a second time in 1981. Holmes made changes to the magazine to refocus on "soldiers" and "prisoners". The early Morriss and Weinstock version of Players magazine turned away many investors as it was considered "so low-minded, low-rent, vulgar, and unconscionable." But Holmes reached out to gain support from these investors in his second appearance as editor in an attempt to change the image of the magazine. "[Holmes] started putting girls in the magazine that [he] would want to date, Sometimes they did have big tits. Sometimes they just had golden eyes, or a luscious smile, or an intense gaze, or something else that was just indefinable, ineffable." Holmes indicates a shift in the magazine's selection and portrayal of models, with an increased focus around class signifiers, in terms of clothing, subject matter, or the women's bodies/features themselves, all in hopes of ditching Players' low-tier reputation and reframing it as a high class magazine.

=== Models featured in Players Magazine ===
Name	Issue	Date
Dorothy Dandridge	n/a	February 1984
Josephine Baker	n/a	February 1984
Marie Laveau	n/a	February 1984
Lynn Whitifield	n/a	February 1984
Domonique Simone	Vol.13 N.10	May 1993
Keli Stewart	Vol.13 N.10	May 1993
Shauna Evans	Vol.12 N.1	August 1999
Angel Kelly	Vol.12 N.1	August 1999
Pam Grier	Vol.1 N.3	1974
Cindy Cook	n/a	n/a
Kerry Onn	n/a	n/a
Heather Hunter	Vol.4 N.2	June 1991

== Sources ==
Miller-Young, Mireille (2014). A Taste for Brown Sugar: Black Women in Pornography. Duke University Press. ISBN 978-0-8223-5814-5.
Nishikawa, Kinohi (2010). Reading the Street: Iceberg Slim, Donald Goines, and the Rise of Black Pulp Fiction (PhD thesis). Duke University. hdl:10161/2451.
