= Sinnamon Love =

American pornographic film actress

Sinamon Love
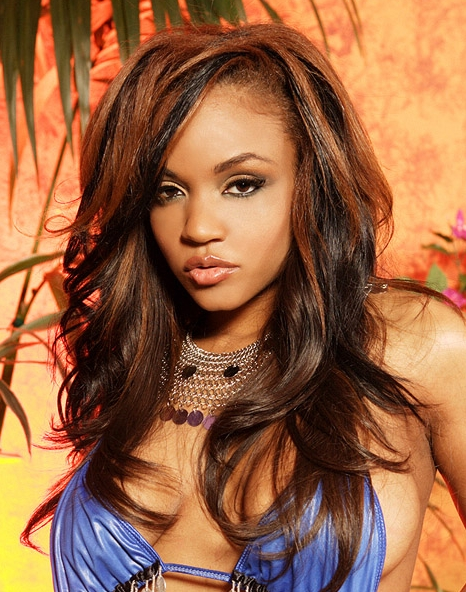
- Love c. 2007
- Occupations: Pornographic film actress; director

Sinnamon Love is an American former pornographic film actress and director.

She directed the movie My Black Ass 4, which received nominations at the 2001 AVN Awards for Best Ethnic-Themed Video and Best Anal Sex Scene (Video). Love was admitted into the Urban X Hall of Fame in 2009, and the AVN Hall of Fame in 2011.

Love appeared on the cover of the first issue of the hip hop and pornography magazine Fish 'N Grits with hip hop star Redman in 2003. She also appeared on The Tyra Banks Show.

She has survived a bout with ovarian cancer, but lost an ovary and a fallopian tube.

Her hobbies include cooking and board games.

In 2010, Love appeared in a Public Service Announcement for the Free Speech Coalition on the topic of Internet copyright infringement of adult content, directed by Michael Whiteacre.

In 2018, Sinnamon Love served as an independent judge for adult directory Slixa.com's first essay contest, calling for entries on the impacts of FOSTA/SESTA.

== Awards ==
- 2009 Urban X Hall of Fame
- 2011 AVN Hall of Fame
- 2023 Urban X Award – Most Popular Sex Educator
