= Richelle Ryan =

American pornographic actress

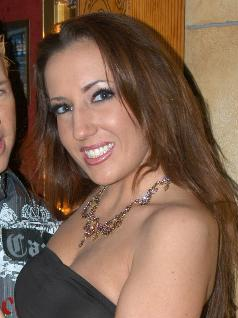
- Ryan in 2007
- Occupation: Pornographic film actress
- Website: richelleryanonline.com

Richelle Ryan is an American pornographic film actress.

== Career ==
Ryan was born and raised in New York, and entered the adult film industry in 2006, appearing in Blazin Hot Bodies and Don't Waste It Taste It. Considered a 'veteran' of the industry, she is often cast as a 'MILF'.

Ryan has partnered with Gaming Adult as characters in their game Hentai Heroes as winnable characters as well as being affiliates with the game.

As of June 2026, Ryan had featured in over 800 adult films. She was contracted to Shoutout Express in 2021.

== Personal life ==
Ryan is a fan of the New York Giants football team, and received attention after stating then-New York Jets quarterback Aaron Rodgers should date her and film OnlyFans content after Rodgers had torn his ACL.

She has also cited Marilyn Monroe as a personal inspiration.

== Awards ==
- 2011 Penthouse Golden G-String Silver Medal
- 2011 May Miss Exoticdancer.com
- 2013 Exotic Dancer Award – Adult Movie Feature Entertainer of the Year
- 2014 NightMoves Award – Best Feature Dancer (Editor's Choice)
- 2015 Exotic Dancer Award – Adult Movie Feature Entertainer of the Year
- 2015 October Miss Exoticdancer.com
- 2015 NightMoves Award – Best Feature Dancer (Editor's Choice)
- 2016 NightMoves Award – Best Feature Dancer (Editor's Choice)
- 2018 The Howard Stern Show – JD’s Favorite Ass
- 2018 Urban X Award – MILF Performer of the Year (tied with Nina Elle)
- 2019 MYLF.com – July MYLF of the Month
- 2020 Urban X Hall of Fame
- 2024 Cammy Award – MILF Performer of the Year
- 2024 MYLF.com – September MYLF of the Month
- 2026 FapHouse Award – Curvy Pornstar of the Year
