= Shyla Stylez =

Canadian pornographic film actress (1982–2017)

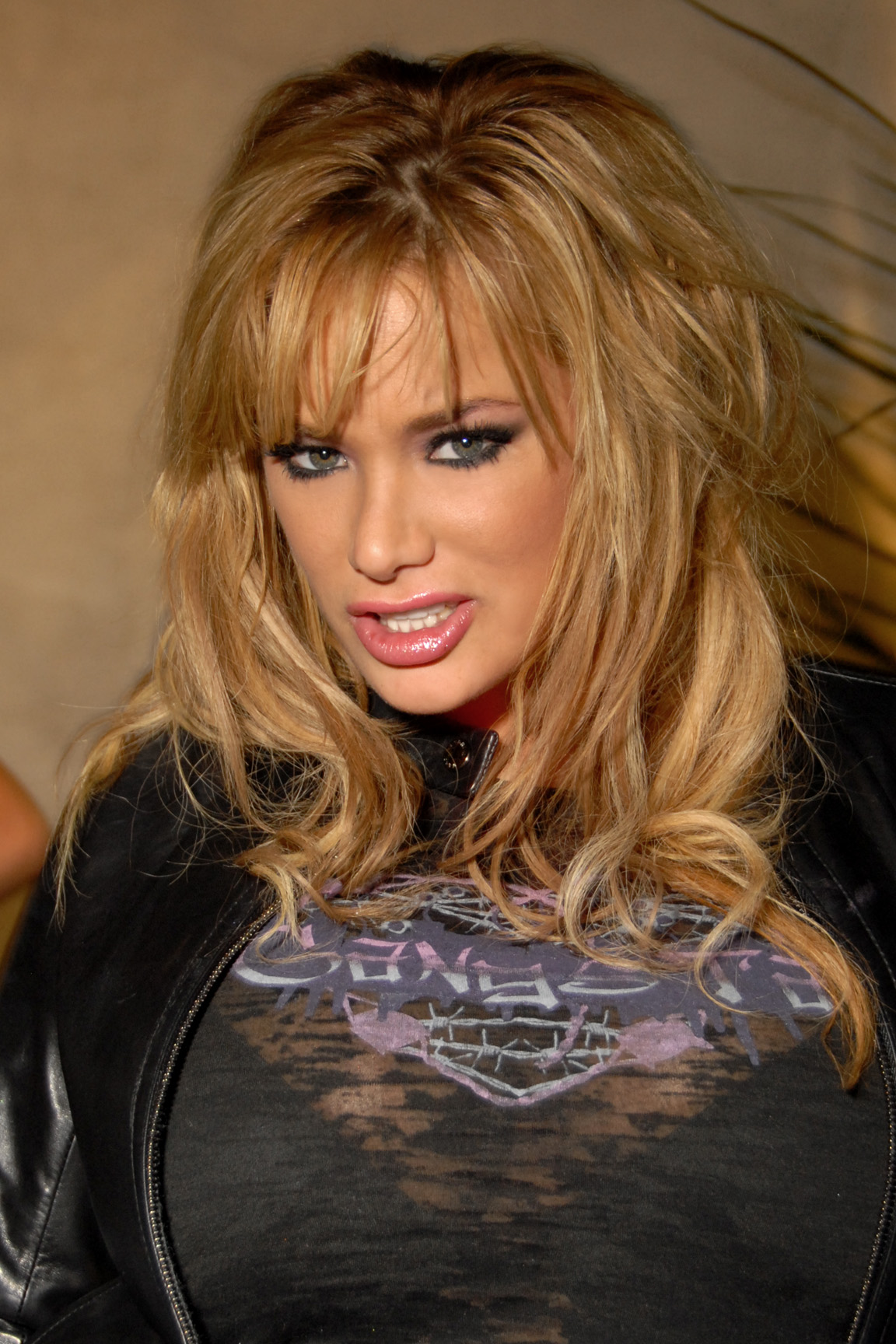
- Stylez in 2009
- Born: Amanda Hardy; September 23, 1982; Armstrong, British Columbia, Canada
- Died: November 9, 2017 (aged 35); Armstrong, British Columbia, Canada
- Other names: Shyla; Amanda Auclair; Shyla Styles; Shyla Stylex; Amanda Friedland
- Occupations: Pornographic film actress; model
- Years active: 2001–2016
- Spouse: Bob Friedland (m. 2002; div. 2003)

Amanda Hardy (September 23, 1982 – November 9, 2017), known professionally as Shyla Stylez, was a Canadian pornographic film actress and model.

== Career ==
Stylez first became interested in entering the pornography industry in her teens, and later moved to Vancouver where she worked as both a stripper and a webcam model, in addition to appearing in nude pictorials in adult magazines such as Hustler and Swank. In her off-time, she would contact studios by email and phone to find out how to appear in films. Stylez shot her debut adult scene in 2001 and received her first AVN Award nominations in 2003, including one for Best New Starlet.

Stylez signed on as exclusive contract performer for Jill Kelly Productions and later married its CEO, Bob Friedland, on October 25, 2002. The couple divorced in August 2003. In August 2005, Jill Kelly Productions filed for bankruptcy. Stylez returned to starring in hardcore movies the following year. Stylez was nominated at the 2007 XRCO Awards for Best Cumback. She hosted the Los Angeles independent TV show Un-Wired TV that same year.

In 2008, Stylez was nominated for Best Supporting Actress at the AVN Awards. The following year, she was nominated for Female Performer of the Year at the XBIZ Awards, in addition to AVN Awards for her performances in the movies Curvy Girls, Full Streams Ahead and Pirates II. On July 30, 2009, Stylez was a guest on The Howard Stern Show along with fellow adult actress Gianna Michaels. In 2010, she was named by Maxim as one of the 12 top female stars in porn. Stylez was inducted into the Halls of Fame of the Urban X Awards and the AVN in 2011 and 2016, respectively. She retired from the adult industry in 2016.

== Personal life and death ==
Stylez was involved in a sex scandal with former Orange County assistant-sheriff George Jaramillo, where she was noted as having had several sexual encounters with him.

On November 9, 2017, Stylez was found unresponsive in her bed at her mother's house in Armstrong. She was pronounced dead shortly after, aged 35. The cause of death was not publicly reported.

== Awards and nominations ==
- 2003 AVN Award nominee – Best New Starlet
- 2003 AVN Award nominee – Best Group Sex Scene, Video – Ass Worship 2
- 2003 XRCO Award nominee – Best Three-way Sex Scene – The Gangbang Girl 34
- 2003 XRCO Award nominee – Best Group Scene – Balls Deep 4
- 2004 AVN Award nominee – Best All-Girl Sex Scene, Video – When The Boyz Are Away, The Girlz Will Play 8
- 2007 AVN Award nominee – Best All-Girl Sex Scene, Video – Girlvana 2
- 2007 XRCO Award nominee – Best Cumback
- 2008 AVN Award nominee – Best Supporting Actress, Video – Coming Home
- 2008 AVN Award nominee – Best Interactive DVD – My Plaything: Shyla Stylez
- 2009 AVN Award nominee – Best Tease Performance – Curvy Girls
- 2009 AVN Award nominee – Best POV Sex Scene – Full Streams Ahead
- 2009 AVN Award nominee – Best Group Sex Scene – Pirates II
- 2009 XBIZ Award nominee – Female Performer of the Year
- 2010 AVN Award nominee – Best POV Sex Scene – Jack's POV 12
- 2011 AVN Award nominee – Best Anal Sex Scene – Big Butts Like It Big 6
- 2011 AVN Award nominee – Best Threeway Sex Scene – Pornstar Workout 2
- 2011 XRCO Award nominee – Orgasmic Analist
- 2011 Urban X Awards Hall of Fame
- 2016 AVN Hall of Fame
