= Jack Napier (actor) =

American pornographic actor (born 1971)

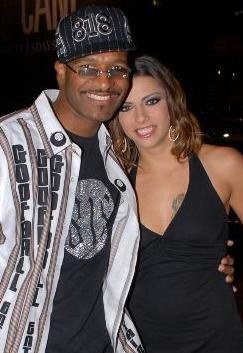
- Napier (left) with actress Carmen Minor
- Born: April 12, 1972 (age 54); Inglewood, California, U.S.
- Occupation: Pornographic actor
- Years active: 1999–2015
- Partner: Cici (2017–present)

Jack Napier (born April 12, 1972) is an American pornographic actor and director. He is of African American and Puerto-Rican descent. He started his adult film career in 1999, and has since appeared in over 350 films. In 2011, he was inducted into the Urban X Awards Hall of Fame.

== Career ==
Napier began performing in pornographic films in 1999. He began directing films in 2000, and has directed movies in series such as There's Something About Jack, Jack Napier's Ridin Dirty, and Black Bottom Girls. His film It's Big, It's Black, It's Jack was nominated for Best Interracial Release at the 2007 AVN Awards. In 2007 he signed an exclusive two-year contract to perform and direct with Vouyer Media, and has consecutive awards for Best Interracial Series with "It's Big It's Black It's Jack" at the 2009, 2010 and 2011 AVN Awards.

As of 2015, Napier has been inactive following a near-fatal motorcycle accident.

== Awards ==
- 2009 AVN Awards – Best Interracial Series – It's Big It's Black It's Jack
- 2010 AVN Awards – Best Interracial Series – It's Big It's Black It's Jack
- 2011 AVN Awards – Best Interracial Series – It's Big It's Black It's Jack
- 2011 Urban X Awards Hall of Fame
