= Vanessa Blue =

American pornographic film actress

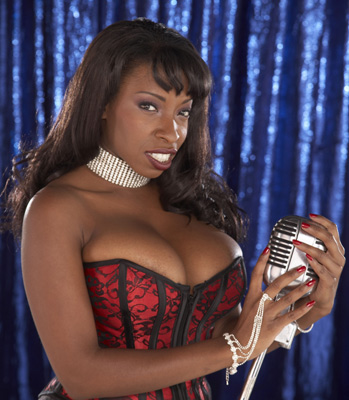
- Other name: Domina X
- Occupations: Pornographic film actress; producer; director
- Website: vanessablue.com

Vanessa Blue is an American pornographic film actress, producer, and director. She was inducted into the AVN Hall of Fame in 2013.

== Career ==
Blue initially worked as a nude dancer and studied to be an emergency medical technician. During her dancing career, she met a fellow dancer who introduced her to fetish modeling. After that, at the suggestion of a different model, she started performing in porn movies. Her first appearance was in a film with Ed Powers. After a year, she took a three-year break, moving to Nebraska to be with her family, but came back to the industry in 2000.

She worked for Mercenary Pictures for several years and directed several of their series, one of which, Black Reign, won the 2005 AVN Award for Best Ethnic-Themed Series. She was engaged to Mercenary's owner, Lexington Steele. In 2008, Steele and Blue filed federal lawsuits against each other over the ownership of numerous videos that first appeared under the Mercenary Pictures label. The suits were settled in March 2009 after meeting with an alternative dispute resolution jurist. She subsequently distributed her movies through Justin Slayer International, signing with them in April 2010.

Blue starred on Playboy TV and hosted Private Calls and Night Calls on Playboy Radio until 2008.

She briefly returned to doing scenes in 2011, and did a series of hardcore scenes for Brazzers.

=== Director ===
Blue has also directed femdom genre of movies under the pseudonym Domina X, and has also been a contract director for DVSX and Adam & Eve.

== Awards ==
In 2008, Blue won an Urban X Award for Videography and was admitted to the Urban X Hall of Fame in 2009. In 2013 she was inducted into the AVN Hall of Fame.
