= Kim Christy =

American female impersonator (born 1950)

- Born: 1950 (age 75–76)
- Occupations: Female impersonator, magazine editor, publisher, screenwriter, adult film producer

Kim Christy (born 1950) was a female impersonator of the 1960s and 1970s, magazine editor and publisher, book author, screenwriter, adult film producer, and first genderfluid person to be inducted into the AVN Hall of Fame.

== Early life ==
Christy was born to Gertie Olsen and her husband in the Bronx, New York. Christy was raised in the Bronx, where they attended Catholic school at Our Lady of Mount Carmel Church. They began dressing in semi-drag and going out in public at age 14. At age 15, they met Billy Schumacher, whose drag name was International Chrysis, at the Tenth of Always, a bar. In 1964, when the two appeared, in drag, in Life magazine by chance, Christy's parents reacted poorly, kicking them out of the house "within a year or two." Christy and Chrysis came to share a small apartment on Mott Street, near Broome Street and Houston, in what later became known as SoHo in New York.

== Career ==
Christy first became a model with the help of Lenny Burtman, an editor for the fetish magazine Exotique. She then became a stripper and showgirl at Club 82. She toured the United States as a female impersonator, subsequently working as a photographer for the publications Mode Avantgarde, Hooker, Eros, and Exposé. She eventually became editor of the publication Female Mimics and the aforementioned Exotique. Part of Female Mimics was the She-Male calendar. Years later, he edited the original Exotique issues into book form, then published a historical survey of sex and fetish images called The Christy Report (2001).

== Awards ==
- Best Fetish Producer (1998)
- Adult Video News Hall Of Fame inductee (2004)

== Filmography ==
Though Christy's full filmography is unknown, some relics of his work remain online.

Year	Film	Distributor
1980	Dreamlovers	
1981	She-Male Encounters	
1981	She-Male Encounters 2	
1983	Divine Atrocities 2	
1983	Corrupt Desires	
1983	Sulka's Wedding	
1984	Sulka's Daughter	
1984	True Crimes of Passion	Caballero Home Video
1985	Mama's Boy	
1985	Squalor Motel	
1985	She-Male Salsa	
1985	Desperate Women	
1987	She-Male Encounters 13: She-Male Reformatory	
1988	She-Male Sanitarium	
1988	She-Male Encounters 18: Murder She-Male Wrote	
1988	She-Male Encounters 17: She-Male Sorority	
1989	Sulka's Nightclub	
1989	She-Male Encounters 19: Toga Party	
1990	Trisexual Encounters 11	Pleasure Productions
1993	My Girl	Sin City
1993	My Girl: Transaction 2	
1997	She-Males Down Under	Leoram Inc.
1997	Boy Chicks I	Sin City
1997	Boy Chicks II	Sin City
1997	Blue Bunny Caper	
1999	She-Male Sorority Secrets	
2001	She-Male Cherry Busters I	Leoram Inc.
2002	Revenge of the She-Males	
