= Urban X Award =

Pornographic film award

Urban X Awards
- Awarded for: To honor achievement in ethnic pornography
- Location: Los Angeles, California
- Country: United States
- Reward: Trophy
- First award: 2008
- Final award: Present
- Website: urbanxawards.com

The Urban X Awards is an annual award ceremony held in the United States to honor achievement in ethnic pornography.

Originally known as the Urban Spice Awards, it was established in 2008 by black adult film director Giana Taylor and last awarded in 2012. The Urban X awards returned after a 5-year hiatus in 2017 and subsequently thereafter. The awards recognize achievement by the adult film stars, producers, directors, agencies, and companies who produce Black, Latin, Asian, and interracial adult content. The winners are voted for by fans on the award's website.

== Inaugural event ==
The inaugural Urban Spice Awards ceremony, held on June 8, 2008 at Platinum Live in Studio City (Los Angeles, CA), were hosted by adult film stars Olivia O'Lovely and Sean Michaels. Michaels stated after the event: "People need to recognize the relevance of tonight. This is a $13-14 billion dollar industry and the urban community is such a big part of that. It's really just time to recognize us the right way".

== Past events ==
The 2009 Urban X Awards, held at Boulevard3 in Hollywood (Los Angeles, CA), were hosted by Mr. Marcus and Roxy Reynolds.

The 2010 Urban X Awards were held at the 740 Club in Los Angeles on July 13, 2010. The hosts were Misty Stone and Dana DeArmond.

The 2011 Urban X Awards were held at the Vault Nightclub in Los Angeles on July 23, 2011. The hosts were Nyomi Banxxx and Alexander DeVoe.

The 2012 Urban X Awards were held at the Palace of the Stars in Glendale on July 22, 2012. The hosts were Nyomi Banxxx and Alexander Devoe. The year 2012 was the first year that the event was filmed for broadcast.

The 2023 Urban X Awards were held at the Globe Theater in Downtown Los Angeles on August 20, 2023. The host was Demi Sutra.

== Hall of Fame Inductees ==
- 2008

Byron Long
Devlin Weed
Heather Hunter
Jeannie Pepper
Johnny Keyes
Julian St. Jox
Lacey Duvalle
Lexington Steele
Mr Marcus
Michael Stefano
Ray Victory
Sean Michaels
Vanessa del Rio

- 2009

Kitten
Kim Eternity
Mark Anthony
Mika Tan
Sinnamon Love
Sledgehammer
TT Boy
Vanessa Blue
Wesley Pipes

- 2010

Alexander DeVoe
Diana DeVoe
Guy DiSilva
Jada Fire
Mercedes Ashley
Nina Hartley
Olivia O'Lovely
Ron Hightower

- 2011

Francesca Le
Jack Napier
Jade Hsu
Lisa Ann
Justin Long
Kelly Starr
Mr. Pete
Mandingo
Miles Long
Sara Jay
Shyla Stylez
Spantaneeus Xtasty
Suave XXX

- 2017

Asa Akira
Brad Armstrong
Carmen Hayes
Cherokee
Farrah Foxxx
Jada Stevens
Jazmine Cashmere
John E Depth
Lisa Daniels
Mia Isabella
Misty Stone
Pinky
Prince Yahshua
Rebecca Bardoux
Roxy Reynolds
Skyy Black
Tony Eveready

- 2018

Alexis Amore
Dapper Dan
Evan Stone
Gianna Michaels
Kaylani Lei
LT
Michelle Maylene
Mone Divine
Nat Turnher
Nyomi Banxxx
Richard Mann

- 2019

Alana Evans
Axel Braun
Beauty Dior
Candace Von
Charlie Mac
Chocolate & Mocha
Chyanne Jacobs
Havana Ginger
Ice La Foxx
James Bartholet
Joachim Kessef
Kapri Styles
Mick Blue

- 2020

Black Cat
Brian Pumper
Caramel
Cindy Starfall
Dynamite
Emy Reyes
Kelly Shibari
Marica Hase
Melrose Foxx
Nicky Starks
Priya Rai
Ray Black
Richelle Ryan
Rico Strong
Shane Diesel
Sophie Dee
Sydnee Capri
TS Foxxxy
Tee Reel
Tia Cyrus

- 2022

Adina Jewel
Angel Eyes
Ana Foxxx
Annie Cruz
Ivan
Jean Claude Baptiste
Jeremy
Joslyn James
Marie Luv
Mya G
Natassia Dreams
Nina Elle
Phoenix Marie
Rico Shades
Rock the Icon
Samone Taylor
Shaundam
Sofia Rose
Vida Valentine
Will Ryder

- 2023

Aurora Jolie
Chris Cock
Daisy Marie
Dana DeArmond
Isiah Maxwell
Jean Val Jean
Joanna Angel
Jon Jon
Kristina Rose
Lee G
Lotus Lain
Luna Star
Manuel Ferrara
Midori
Mime Freak
Porsha Carrera
Rusty Nails
Sheena Ryder
Stacie Lane
Terry Burton

- 2024

Abella Danger
Aryana Starr
Busty Cookie
Cherie DeVille
Cutler X
Domonique Simone
Eddie Jaye
Ginger Lynn
Justin Slayer
Kelly Divine
Leya Falcon
Liv Revamped
London Keyes
Lucky Starr
Mark Wood
Marco Banderas
Moe the Monster
Seka
Skin Diamond
Slim Poke
Tyler Knight
Venus Lux
Vicki Chase
Wendy Williams

- 2025

Anita Peida
Aryana Adin
Ava Devine
Dee Baker
Jessica Bangkok
Jessy Dubai
Karla Lane
Kendra Lust
Kiki Daire
Mellanie Monroe
Micky Lynn
Mocha Menage
Ryan Conner
Sierra Devi

- 2026

Brittany Andrews
Flower Tucci
Holly Hendrix
Kira Noir
Krystal Davis
Lana Sands
Monique
Obsession
September Reign
Teanna Trump

== List of winners 2008–2012 ==
	2008	2009	2010	2011	2012	2017
Best All Sex Release	Sneaky Sex in the Shower (Evasive Angles)	Dynamic Booty 4 (Alexander Devoe Productions)		Cum In Me Baby 2 (WCP)		
Best All Sex Series		The Black Assassin (Silverback Ent/JSI)				
Best Anal Release	Black Ass Addiction 2 (Alexander DeVoe/Jules Jordan Video)	Phat Black Juicy Anal Booty 3 (WCP)	Lisa Ann's Hung XXX (CJ Wright Productions)	Tan Line Tushies (Wicked Pictures)	Black Anal Addiction (Mike Adriano/Evil Angel)	
Best Anal Series		Top Guns (Mercenary Pictures)	Black Ass Addiction (Alexander Devoe Productions)	Up that Black Ass (Elegant Angel)	Gapeman (Freaky Empire/B. Pumper)	
Best Anal Sex Scene	Aurora Jolie & Brian Pumper	Dana DeArmond & Rico Strong (Rico the Destroyer - Alexander Devoe Productions)	Dana DeArmond & LT (Juicy White Anal Booty 4 - WCP)	Nyomi Banxxx & Marco Banderas (Dynamic Booty 5 - Alexander DeVoe Productions)	Kagney Linn Karter & Prince Yahshua (Prince The Penetrator - Smash Pictures)	
Best Black Release		Booty Clappin Superfreaks (Evasive Angel)	Black Reign 16 (Mercenary Pictures)	Heavy Metal II (Rosebud)	Black Reign 17 (Mercenary Pictures/Lexington Steele)	
Best Black Series		Booty Talk (WCP)	New Lil Freaks get it Poppin (Freaky Empire)	Phat Black Juicy Anal Booty (WCP)	Booty Talk (West Coast Productions)	
Best Latin Release		Juicy Latin Coochie 2 (B Pumper Productions)	Juicy Latin Coochie (Freaky Empire)	Bottoms Up in Brazil (Wicked Pictures)	Made in Xspana 8 (Nacho Vidal/Evil Angel)	
Best Latin Series		Deep in Latin Cheeks (Alexander Devoe Productions)	Deep in Latin Cheeks (ADP)		Made in Xspana (Nacho Vidal)	
Best Asian Release		White on Rice (Mercenary Pictures)	Asian Fixation (Tom Byron Pictures)	Asian Eyes (Wicked Pictures)	Asa Akira Is Insatiable 2 (Elegant Angel)	
Best Asian Series		Invasian (Jules Jordan Video)			Asa Akira is Insatiable (Elegant Angel)	
Best Big Butt Release	My Baby Got Back 44 (Afro-Centric/Video Team)	Wet Juices Asses 3 (Alexander De Voe Productions)	Lexington Loves Phat Black Asses (Mercenary Pictures)	Big Butt Bettys 2 (Silverback Ent)	Big Wet Brazilian Asses 9 (Elegant Angel)	
Best Big Butt Series		Big Booty White Girls (JSI)	Phat Ass Freak (West Coast Flava)	Nuttin Butt Pinky (Black Market)	Big Black Wet Asses (LT Entertainment/Elegant Angel)	
Best MILF Release	Sexy Bootylicious Moms (West Coast Productions)	Cougars #3 (Anabolic)	Cougar Mammoth Cock Hunt (WCP)	Milf Mann 2 (Black Market)	Mandingo Hide Your Wives (Jules Jordan video)	
Best MILF Series		Milf Magnet (Mercenary Pictures)				
Best Gay Release			Ty's Play Room (Ty Lattimore Ent)	What Asses are Made Of 2 (Black Rayne)		
Best Gay Series				Breed It Raw (Black Rayne)		
Parody Of The Year			Not The Cosby's XXX (Pure Play Media)	Official Friday Parody (Zero Tolerance)		
Best Girl/Girl Release	Womenopoly 2 (Female Factory/Black Market)	Black Sexy Lesbians (WCP/After Dark Pictures)	Black Teen Pussy Party 5 (Black Magic Pictures)	True Lesbian Divas (WCP)		
Best Girl/Girl Series	Sistas (Afro-Centric/Video Team)	Womenopoly (Female Factory Productions/Black Market XXX)	Love Kara Tai 3 (Josh Stone Productions/JSI)			
Best Girl/Girl Sex Scene		Misty Stone & Rane Revere (Black Teen Pussy #3 - Black Magic Pictures)		Baby Cakes, Imani Rose & Evanni Solei (Black Lesbian Strap Attack - WCP)		
Feature Movie Of The Year	Ransom (West Coast Productions)	Big Ass Stalker (WCP/After Dark)		Speed (Brad Armstrong/Wicked Pictures)	Revenge Of the Petites (AMKingkdom, director Harry Sparks)	
Best Gonzo Release	Yo Quiero Chocolate 4 (Candy Shop/Red Light District)	Bubble Butt BBQ #2 (Black Ice)				
Best Gonzo Series		100% it's a Black Thang (Anabolic Digital)				
Best Wall to Wall Release	China Blue (Teravision)					
Best Vignette Release	Freakaholics 2 (Alexander DeVoe/Jules Jordan Video)					
Best Interracial Release	Lex on Blondes 4 (Mercenary Pictures)	Black Ass Master 2 (Jules Jordan Video)	Lex the Impaler 5 (Jules Jordan Video)	Josh Stones South Beach Crusin 5 (Josh Stone Productions)	The Brother Load 3 (Chris Streams Productions/Jules Jordan)	
Best Interracial Series	Phat Ass White Booty (Alexander DeVoe/Jules Jordan Video)	Gapeman (B. Pumper Productions/Evil Angel)	Rico the Destroyer (Alexander Devoe Productions)	Phat Ass White Booty 6 (ADP)		
Best BBW Release	Infattuation (Female Factory/Black Market)			Biggest Ass Ever 3 (WCP)	Meaty Mamas (Black Market)	
Best BBW Series		Heavy Weight Honeys (Black Market)				
Best BBW Series			Gigantic Brickhouse Butts 7 (Evasive Angles)			
Best Oral Release	Pinky's Dick Sucking for Dumb Asses (Black Market)	Throat Injection (Alexander Devoe Productions)		Throat Injection 3 (Alexander DeVoe Productions)		
Best Oral Series		Chicken Heads (Black Ice)	Throat Injection (Alexander Devoe Productions)	Head Game (Black Market)		
Best Orgy Release		Nightmare on Black Street (Combat Zone)				
Best Orgy Series		Azz and Mo Ass Orgy (WCP)				
Best Amateur Release	Amateur Prospects (Black Market)	Absolute Amateurs (Vouyer Media)				
Best Amateur Series		Fresh Out The Box (Mercenary Pictures)				
Best POV Release		Tunnel Vision 3 (Jules Jordan Video)				
Best POV Series		Nightstick Black Pov (Mercenary Pictures)	Nightstick (Mercenary Pictures)			
Best POV Sex Scene		Lacey Duvalle & Mario Cassinni (Tunnel Vision 3 - Jules Jordan Video)				
Best Pro-Am Release	Black Moon Rising 6 (Mercenary Pictures)				Amateur Assault 2 (Vince Voyeur Unleashed)	
Best Reality Release	Girlfriend That's My Man (West Coast Productions)					
Best Vignette Release		Freakaholics 3 (Alexander Devoe Productions)				
Best Vignette Series		Chocolate Milf (Black Ice)				
Best Interactive Release		Digital Dyme Piece Beauty Dior (Black Market/XXX)				
Best Anal Performer	Marie Luv & Jasmine Cashmere (Tie)	Jada Fire	Capri Styles	Jada Fire		
Porn Star of the Year		Pinky	Misty Stone	Asa Akira		
Female Performer of the Year	Roxy Reynolds	Pinky	Rebeca Linares	Nyomi Banxxx	Skin Diamond	
Best Female Newcomer	Misty Love	Ms. Booty	Summer Bailey	Gizelle	Leilani Leeane	
Best Interracial Star	Belladonna	Sara Jay	Ashli Orion & Katie Kox (Tie)	Sophie Dee	Jada Stevens	
Best Male Newcomer	J. Strokes	Ray Black	Flash Brown	Lucas Stone		
Best Male Performer	Mr. Marcus	Mr. Marcus	Prince Yashua	Prince Yashua	Prince Yashua	
Best Oral Performer	Jada Fire		Pinky	Lethal Lipps	Julie Cash	
Best Oral Male	Byron Long					
Crossover Female	Roxy Reynolds	Pinky				
Crossover Male	Lexington Steele	Mr. Marcus				
Best MILF Performer		Nyomi Banxxx		Lisa Ann	Lisa Ann	
Biggest Ass In Porn	Cherokee	Mz. Booty		Cherokee D Ass		
Nicest Boobs In Porn		Carmen Hayes		Alisha Madison		
Freakiest Girl In Porn	Monique					
Hottest BBW Star	Crystal Clear					
BBW With The Biggest Ass In Porn				Superstar XXX		
BBW of the Year		Bootyliscious	Farrah Foxxx	Platinum Puzzy	Darling Darla	
BBW Newcomer of the Year		Farrah Foxx	Buttafly Azz	Gigi Star	Delilah Black	
BBW IR star of the Year					Samantha 38G	
Best Male Performer in a BBW Movie		CJ Wright				
TS Performer of the year					TS Madison	
TS IR performer of the year					Wendy Williams	
Best Videographer	Vanessa Blue					
Best Sex Scene	Marie Luv & Marco Banderas (Minority Rules - Wicked Pictures)					
Best 3-Way Sex Scene		Mya Nichole, Prince Yahshua, & Rico Strong (Deep in Latin Cheeks - Alexander Devoe Productions)	Pinky, Kapri Styles, & Richard Mann (Nuttin Butt Pinky #3 - Black Market)	Sophie Dee, Gianna Michaels, & Justin Long (Sophie Dee's 3 Ways - Club Sophie Dee)	Sydnee Capri, Naveah Keyes, & LT (Up That Black Ass 8 - LT Entertainment/Elegant Angel)	
Best Group Sex Scene	Alone in the Dark 6 (Candy Shop/Red Light District)					
Best Couples Sex Scene		Kirra Lynne & Prince (Black Assassin 3 - Silverback Ent)		Asa Akira, Mr. Pete Vajazzled / Miles Long for Third Degree Films	Misty Stone & Bill Bailey (Horizon - Wicked)	
Best New Company	Black Market	Justin Slayer International				
Best Studio	West Coast Productions	West Coast Productions	Silverback Ent			
Director Of The Year	Alexander DeVoe	Alexander DeVoe	Alexander DeVoe	Lexington Steele		
Best Feature Director	Bishop	Bishop	Bishop	Brad Armstrong		
Best Gonzo Director	Juan Cuba	Justin Slayer	Lexington Steele	Brian Pumper	Mason (Asa Akira is Insatiable 2)	
Best Director - Body Of Work			Brian Pumper		LT	
Visionary	Alexander DeVoe					
Lifetime Achievement		West Coast Productions				
BBW Company of the Year		Evasive Angels				
Best Internet Studio		Bangbros.com	Bangbros.com	Bangbros.com		
Best Interracial Star Website			katiekox.com	sarajay.com		
Best Talent Website		Pinkyxxx.com				
Best BBW Niche Website			bustybabydolls.com	bustybabydolls.com		
Best BBW Personal Website			farrahfoxxx.com	cottoncandi.com		
Best Starlet Website			pinkyfoxxx.com	pinkyxxx.com		
Best Fetish Website			kink.com	ebonyfetishtheater.com		
Best Fetish Star Website				caramelvixen.com		
Best Ethnic Gay Website				breeditraw.com		
Best Ethnic Transsexual Website			sexxyjade.com	bigdickbitch.com		
Best Interracial Transsexual Website			hotwendywilliams.com	hotwendywilliams.com		
