= I Wanna Thank Me (song) =

Single by Snoop Dogg featuring Marknoxx

from the album I Wanna Thank Me
- Released: July 3, 2019
- Recorded: 2019
- Genre: West Coast hip hop; G-funk
- Length: 3:42
- Label: Empire; Doggystyle
- Songwriters: Calvin Broadus; Kevin Gilliam
- Producer: Battlecat

Snoop Dogg singles chronology
"Hallelujah" (2019)	"I Wanna Thank Me" (2019)	"Qué Maldición" (2020)

"I Wanna Thank Me" is a song by American rapper Snoop Dogg. It was released on July 3, 2019, as the first single from his seventeenth studio album of the same name, through Empire Distribution and Doggystyle Records. The song was produced by Battlecat, who also composed the song along with the rapper, it features vocals from Marknoxx.

== Composition ==
"I Wanna Thank Me" is a mid-tempo West Coast hip hop song that features beats and minor influences of G-funk. The song itself contains a sample of "The Next Episode" by Dr. Dre featuring Snoop Dogg, Kurupt and Nate Dogg, from Dre's album 2001.

== Music video ==
On July 3, 2019, Snoop uploaded the music video for "I Wanna Thank Me" on his YouTube account. The clip opens with footage of Snoop's acceptance speech during his Hollywood Walk of Fame ceremony in 2018. The music video was directed by Dah Dah.

== Release history ==
Release history and formats for "I Wanna Thank Me"
Region	Date	Format	Label	Ref.
United States	July 3, 2019	Digital download; streaming	Doggystyle; Empire	
