= Qué Maldición =

Single by Banda MS and Snoop Dogg
- Released: May 1, 2020
- Length: 3:23
- Label: Lizos Music
- Lyricist(s): Calvin Cordozar Broadus Jr.; Daniel Anthony Farris; Jesus Omar Tarazon Medina; Pavel Josue Ocampo Quintero
- Producer(s): Pro 65

Banda MS singles chronology
"Es Hora de Unirnos" (2020)	"Qué Maldición" (2020)	"La Casita" (2020)

Snoop Dogg singles chronology
" I Wanna Thank Me" (2019)	"Qué Maldición" (2020)	"Black Man in America" (2020)

Music video
- "Qué Maldición" on YouTube

"Qué Maldición" is a song by Mexican banda group Banda MS, featuring American rapper Snoop Dogg. It was released via Lizos Music on May 1, 2020. A remix version with Becky G was released on December 10, 2020.

== Charts ==
Weekly chart performance for "Qué Maldición"
Chart (2020)	Peak position
Mexico Airplay (Billboard)	11
US Bubbling Under Hot 100 Singles (Billboard)	1
US Hot Latin Songs (Billboard)	4
US Latin Airplay (Billboard)	9
US Regional Mexican Airplay (Billboard)	2

== Certifications ==
Certifications for "Qué Maldición"
Region	Certification	Certified units/sales
United States (RIAA)	9× Platinum (Latin)	540,000^{‡}
^{‡} Sales+streaming figures based on certification alone.

== Release history ==
Release dates and formats for "Qué Maldición"
Region	Date	Format	Label	Ref.
Various	May 1, 2020	Digital download; streaming	Lizos Music	
Various	December 10, 2020	Remix	Lizos Music	
