= Bible of Love =

2018 studio album by Snoop Dogg

Studio album by Snoop Dogg
- Released: March 16, 2018
- Recorded: 2017
- Genres: Gospel; Christian hip-hop; R&B; spoken word
- Length: 134:01
- Labels: RCA Inspiration; All the Time Entertainment
- Producers: Snoop Dogg (exec.); Lonny Bereal (exec.)

Snoop Dogg chronology
220 (2018)	Bible of Love (2018)	I Wanna Thank Me (2019)

Bible of Love (also known by its full title Snoop Dogg Presents Bible of Love) is the sixteenth studio album by American rapper Snoop Dogg. It was released on March 16, 2018, by RCA Inspiration. Bible of Love serves as his debut gospel album, much like Reincarnated (under his different persona Snoop Lion) served as his debut reggae album. Snoop himself served as executive producer over the entirety of the project, alongside Lonny Bereal. Bible of Love is also his first double studio LP, featuring 32 tracks. It features guest appearances from artists such as Tye Tribbett, Faith Evans, Rance Allen, and Kim Burrell, among others. Snoop Dogg revealed during the album’s press recordings that he reconverted to Christianity following a brief stint with Rastafari.

== Background ==
Snoop Dogg officially announced the album on January 24, 2018, after teasing a gospel album for a year, stating "It's always been on my heart. I just never got around to it because I always be doing gangsta business or doing this or doing that, I just felt like it's been on my heart too long. I need to do it now."

Snoop was introduced to gospel music by his late grandmother, Dorothy Tate. He said of the album: "I am blessed to have so many legendary friends join me on this journey. As the country is in one of its heaviest times and is so divided, I wanted to make an album that spreads love and unity around the world. That's what I was taught, so that's all I know. Real love." He was also inspired by his discussions with Faith Evans while working together on the Notorious B.I.G. tribute track "When We Party". USA Today described Snoop Dogg's role on the album as "more a curator than an artist". The Grio compared it to Drake's More Life mixtape in terms of how the album is put together.

A music video for the song "Words Are Few" featuring B.Slade was released to promote the album. The album was released on Snoop's newly founded All The Time Entertainment label, a label created to give opportunity to up-and-coming gospel artists. Snoop Dogg performed at the Super Bowl Gospel Celebration at Bethel University, becoming the first secular artist to perform at the event. At the event, he stated about the album, "The record's all about love from start to finish. That's the way you change the world, by putting love in it."

During the album’s studio recordings, he revealed that he is a born-again Christian.

== Critical reception ==
Professional ratings
Aggregate scores
Source	Rating
Metacritic	54/100
Review scores
Source	Rating
AllMusic	3/5 stars
CCM Magazine	4.5/5 stars
Exclaim!	3/5 stars
The Guardian	2/5 stars
HotNewHipHop	3/5 stars
Slant Magazine	2/5 stars
The Times	2/5 stars

Critical reception to the album was mixed. It holds a 54 out of 100 on the review aggregation website Metacritic, indicating "mixed or average reviews". The Guardian stated the album "is a two-hour-plus hip-hop gospel confection that's briefly charmingly pleasant, then heartbreakingly boring. It has less edge than a child's balloon." Slant Magazine criticized the album as predictable and "surprisingly traditional". AllMusic stated of the album, "There's a redemptive quality to the effort, especially considering his past legal troubles, which adds heft to an otherwise head-scratching release." USA Today stated the album "is 32 songs of spiritual uplift, consistently enjoyable and even moving at times, with Snoop making just enough appearances to remind listeners of his involvement, and doing some soul-baring in the process." Vulture described the album as "surprisingly great", saying "It handles the business of melding the seemingly incompatible worlds of G-funk and gospel with respect for the mechanics of both."

The South End praised Snoop's verses, but criticized his lack of appearances on the album, as did The Linfield Review. PopMatters called it an "absolutely impressive effort" and "a solid effort that's better than it has any business being."

Response from Christian publications were more positive. Christian magazine Relevant praised the album for its religious message, stating it is "impressively thorough in its representation of the saving grace and expansive love of God" as well as "a tasteful blend of vintage gospel and new school Christian contemporary music". CCM Magazine praised the diversity of the production and called the album "surprisingly impressive." Christian Today called the album "an impressive and remarkable worship record in its own right."

Snoop Dogg himself responded to negative reviews, stating "This is not a money-driven project, it's a spirit-driven project."

== Commercial performance ==
Bible of Love debuted at number 148 on the US Billboard 200 with 5,000 album-equivalent units, which made it his lowest entry on the chart until 2021's From tha Streets 2 tha Suites, which failed to chart. It was the 20th best-selling digital album of the week, selling 3,000 digital copies in its first week. The album became Snoop's first entry on the US Gospel Albums chart, where it debuted at number one. Bible of Love also became Snoop's 25th entry on the Billboard 200. The album topped the Gospel Albums chart for seven non-consecutive weeks.

== Track listing ==
Credits adapted from Tidal.

- All songs produced by Snoop Dogg and Lonny Bereal Jr.

Disc 1: Chapter One
No.	Title	Writer(s)	Length
1.	"Thank You Lord (Intro)" (featuring Chris Bolton)	L. T. Hutton; Chris Bolton	1:02
2.	"Love for God" (featuring Uncle Chucc, The Zion Messengers, and K-Ci)	Charles Hamilton	3:14
3.	"Always Got Something to Say"	Calvin Broadus; Kevin Gilliam; S. Dollar	4:05
4.	"Defeated" (featuring John P. Kee)	Joseph Alonzo Bereal, Jr.; Bennet Paysinger; M. L. Bereal; John P. Kee	4:33
5.	"In the Name of Jesus" (featuring October London)	Kadjaly A. Conteh; Jared Samuel Erskine	3:29
6.	"Going Home" (featuring Uncle Chucc and The Zion Messengers)	Hamilton; Mahalia Jackson	4:13
7.	"Saved" (featuring Faith Evans and 3rd Generation (Bereal Family))	J. A. Bereal, Jr.; Paysinger; M. L. Bereal; T. Bereal, Jr.	3:35
8.	"Sunshine Feel Good" (featuring Kim Burrell)	Gilliam; S. Wonder; Anthony Williams II	3:48
9.	"Sunrise" (featuring Sly Pyper)	Broadus; S. Jordan; Conteh	3:57
10.	"Pure Gold" (featuring The Clark Sisters)	Elbernita Twinkie Clark	5:37
11.	"Pain" (featuring B Slade)	Williams II	4:44
12.	"New Wave" (featuring Mali Music)	M. L. Bereal; Kortney J. Pollard	5:21
13.	"On Time" (featuring B Slade)	C. Johnson; J. A. Bereal, Jr.; Paysinger; M. L. Bereal; Williams II	3:48
14.	"You" (featuring Tye Tribbett)	J. Hill; J. Dawkins; T. Bush; S. Green, Jr.; Tye Tribbett	3:46
15.	"One More Day" (featuring Charlie Wilson)	Charlie Bereal; J. Griffin; J. A. Bereal, Jr.; Paysinger; M. L. Bereal; Williams II; J. Bereal, Sr.	4:46

Disc 2: Chapter Two
No.	Title	Writer(s)	Length
1.	"Bible of Love (Interlude)" (featuring Lonny Bereal)	J. Griffin; J. A. Bereal, Jr.	2:40
2.	"Come as You Are" (featuring Marvin Sapp and Mary Mary)	W. Campbell; C. Johnson; J. Davis; E. Campbell; J. Griffin; J. A. Bereal, Jr.; Paysinger; M. L. Bereal; Marvin Sapp	5:41
3.	"Talk to God" (featuring Mali Music and Kim Burrell)	Paysinger; M. L. Bereal; Pollard	4:23
4.	"Changed" (featuring Isaac Carree and Jazze Pha)	Phalon Alexander; E. Williams; A. Smith; Isaac Carree; T. Broome	3:19
5.	"Praise Him" (featuring Soopafly)	Priest Brooks	3:33
6.	"Blessing Me Again" (featuring Rance Allen)	Rance Allen; Broadus; S. Allen; C. Byrd	4:02
7.	"Blessed & Highly Favored (Remix)" (performed by The Clark Sisters)	Karen Clark Sheard	5:04
8.	"Unbelievable" (featuring Ev3)	D. Hall; B. Edwards, Jr.; G. Morgan; L. Williams; C. Holmes; M. Palacios; C. Barksdale; L. R. Woodruff, Jr.; Shante Hearst; Shamara Hearst	3:35
9.	"No One Else" (featuring K-Ci)	J. Griffin; J. A. Bereal, Jr.; Paysinger; M. L. Bereal; Cedric Renard Hailey	4:15
10.	"Chizzle" (featuring Sly Pyper and Daz Dillinger)	D. Arnaud; S. Jordan; Conteh	4:41
11.	"My God" (featuring James Wright)	James Wright; Broadus; Gilliam	2:50
12.	"When It's All Over" (featuring Patti LaBelle)	Broadus; Patti LaBelle; J. A. Bereal, Jr.; Paysinger; M. L. Bereal; T. A. Whitfield	5:02
13.	"Crown" (featuring Tyrell Urquhart, Jazze Pha, and Issac Carree)	Tyrell Urquhart	3:31
14.	"Call Him" (featuring Fred Hammond)	P. Brooks; D. L. Brooks	4:28
15.	"Change the World" (featuring John P. Kee)	Broadus; Kee	5:34
16.	"Voices of Praise"	Broadus; Gilliam	3:58
17.	"Words Are Few" (featuring B Slade)	Williams II	7:28

== Charts ==
=== Weekly charts ===
Chart (2018)	Peak position
US Billboard 200	148
US Top Gospel Albums (Billboard)	1

=== Year-end charts ===
Chart (2018)	Position
US Top Gospel Albums (Billboard)	4
