= I Wanna Thank Me =

2019 studio album by Snoop Dogg

Studio album by Snoop Dogg
- Released: August 16, 2019
- Recorded: 2018–19
- Genre: West Coast hip-hop
- Length: 75:23
- Labels: Empire; Doggy Style
- Producers: Snoop Dogg (exec.); DJ Battlecat; Swizz Beatz; Dunlap Exclusive; Fredwreck; Soopafly; Rick Rock; Jermaine Dupri; Mustard; Jazze Pha; DJ Green Lantern; Vangogh; Russ; TropKillaz; Steelz

Snoop Dogg chronology
Bible of Love (2018)	I Wanna Thank Me (2019)	From tha Streets 2 tha Suites (2021)

Singles from I Wanna Thank Me
- 1. "I Wanna Thank Me" Released: July 3, 2019

I Wanna Thank Me is the seventeenth studio album by American rapper Snoop Dogg. It was released on August 16, 2019, by Doggy Style Records and Empire Distribution. It was supported by an eponymous single, "I Wanna Thank Me", released on July 3.

== Background ==
On March 27, 2019, Snoop Dogg announced through his Instagram account that he was releasing a new album in May. The album's release date was eventually postponed to August 16.

The album consists of 22 tracks and features production from DJ Battlecat, Swizz Beatz, Dunlap Exclusive, Fredwreck, Soopafly, Rick Rock, Jermaine Dupri, Mustard, Jazze Pha, DJ Green Lantern and Russ. It features guest appearances from Rick Rock, Chris Brown, Anitta, Jermaine Dupri, Stressmatic, YG, RJ, Mustard, Slim Jxmmi of Rae Sremmurd, Russ, Wiz Khalifa, DJ Battlecat, Lil Duval, Swizz Beatz, Ozuna, Slick Rick, Trey Songz and Snoop's cousin, the late Nate Dogg, among others.

== Cover art ==
The album cover references the 1903 painting A Friend in Need, part of the Dogs Playing Poker series by Cassius Marcellus Coolidge. It was designed by Chicago artist Malachi Wright.

== Reception ==
Professional ratings
Review scores
Source	Rating
Allmusic	3/5 stars
HipHopDX	4.3/5
RapReviews	6/10

The album received generally positive reviews. Neil Z. Yeung of Allmusic stated, "There's not much here to hail a return-to-form renaissance, but for those in need of a solid dose of the familiar, I Wanna Thank Me is pure Snoop, complete with sly boasts, smooth production, and nostalgic, kush-loving comforts."

== Commercial performance ==
I Wanna Thank Me debuted at number 76 on the US Billboard 200 with 9,000 album-equivalent units, becoming his second lowest-charting album on the chart after his 2018 gospel album Bible of Love.

== Track listing ==
Credits adapted from Tidal

No.	Title	Writer(s)	Producer(s)	Length
1.	"What U Talkin' Bout"	Calvin Broadus Jr.; Charles Dunlap; Jason Martin	Dunlap Exclusive	2:43
2.	"So Misinformed" (featuring Slick Rick)	Broadus Jr.; Kevin Gilliam; Richard Walters; Bob Marley; Peter Tosh	DJ Battlecat	3:52
3.	"Let Bygones Be Bygones"	Broadus Jr.; Gilliam; Martin	DJ Battlecat	3:05
4.	"One Blood, One Cuzz" (featuring DJ Battlecat)	Broadus Jr.; Gilliam; Jalil Hutchins; Lawrence Smith; Sunday Gaiter	DJ Battlecat	3:53
5.	"Countdown" (featuring Swizz Beatz)	Broadus Jr.; Kasseem Dean	Swizz Beatz	2:19
6.	"I C Your Bullshit"	Broadus Jr.; Bill Laswell; Martin; Herbie Hancock; James Green; Michael Beinhorn	Vangogh	3:47
7.	"Turn Me On" (featuring Chris Brown)	Broadus Jr.; Christopher Brown; Phalon Alexander; Elon Brown; Jevon Sims	Jazze Pha	3:18
8.	"Blue Face Hunnids" (featuring YG and Mustard)	Broadus Jr.; Keanon Jackson; Dijon McFarlane; Leslie Wakefield Jr.	Mustard	3:17
9.	"New Booty"	Broadus Jr.; Gilliam	DJ Battlecat	3:01
10.	"Take Me Away" (featuring Russ and Wiz Khalifa)	Broadus Jr.; Russell Vitale; Cameron Thomaz	Russ	3:56
11.	"Do It When I'm in It" (featuring Jermaine Dupri, Ozuna, and Slim Jxmmi)	Broadus Jr.; Jermaine Mauldin; Juan Rosado; Aaquil Brown; Vicente Saavedra	Jermaine Dupri	3:54
12.	"First Place" (featuring Tdot Illdude)	Broadus Jr.; Thomas Goodwin; James D'Agostino; Henry Mancini	DJ Green Lantern	3:38
13.	"Focused"	Broadus Jr.; Darhyl Camper; Gabriella Wilson; Green; Martin; Justin Love	Vangogh	2:43
14.	"Rise to the Top" (featuring Swizz Beatz and Trey Songz)	Broadus Jr.; Dean; Tremaine Neverson	Swizz Beatz	4:32
15.	"Wintertime in June" (featuring Nate Dogg and Lacci)	Broadus Jr.; Nathaniel Hale; James Fauntleroy; Farid Nassar	Fredwreck	4:58
16.	"Doo Wop Thank Me" (featuring The HamilTones)	Broadus Jr.; Corey Williams; Antonio Bowers; Tillman Darrell	The HamilTones	0:59
17.	"Main Phone" (featuring Stressmatic and Rick Rock)	Broadus Jr.; Thomas Jackson; Ricardo Thomas	Rick Rock	3:41
18.	"Do You Like I Do" (featuring Lil Duval)	Broadus Jr.; Roland Powell; Priest Brooks; Donald Smith	Soopafly	3:58
19.	"I've Been Looking for You" (featuring Eric Jaye)	Broadus Jr.; Eric Jarrel Clark; D'Agostino; Roy Ayers	DJ Green Lantern	4:09
20.	"Little Square UBitchU" (featuring Anitta)	Broadus Jr.; Larissa Machado; Alejandra Alberti; Federico Endresi; José Pinheiro	TropKillaz	2:34
21.	"Ventalation" (featuring Azjah, RJ, and $tupid Young)	Broadus Jr.; Aja Kellum; Rodney Brown, Jr.; Alex Pham; Christopher Medina	Steelz	3:25
22.	"I Wanna Thank Me" (featuring Marknoxx)	Broadus Jr.; Gilliam; Billy Davenport; Mark Dove; Terence Harden	DJ Battlecat	3:41
Total length:				75:23

== Charts ==
Chart (2019)	Peak position
Australian Digital Albums (ARIA)	25
Belgian Albums (Ultratop Flanders)	63
Canadian Albums (Billboard)	83
Dutch Albums (Album Top 100)	40
French Albums (SNEP)	129
Swiss Albums (Schweizer Hitparade)	23
US Billboard 200	76
US Top Album Sales (Billboard)	51
US Independent Albums (Billboard)	14
US Top R&B/Hip-Hop Albums (Billboard)	41
