= List of awards and nominations received by Snoop Dogg =

Snoop Dogg awards and nominations
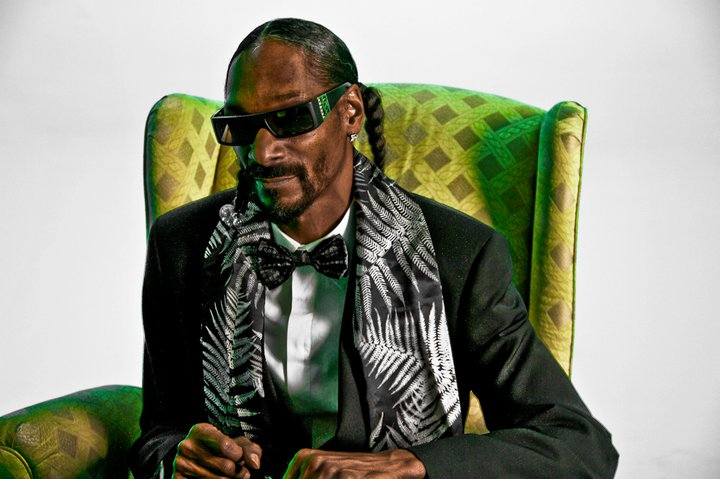
- Snoop Dogg during a photoshoot.
Awards and nominations
Award	Wins	Nominations
American Music Awards	1	1
APRA	1	1
BET	1	6
Grammy	0	17
MTV Australia	2	3
MTV Europe	1	8
MTV VMA	2	8
MTV Japan	0	3
Emmy Awards	3	4

Totals (Note: Certain award groups do not simply award one winner. They acknowledge several different recipients, have runners-up, and have third place. Since this is a specific recognition and is different from losing an award, runner-up mentions are considered wins in this award tally. For simplification and to avoid errors, each award in this list has been presumed to have had a prior nomination.)
- Wins: 30
- Nominations: 100

The following is a list of awards and nominations received by American rapper Snoop Dogg.

== American Music Awards ==
The American Music Awards is an annual awards ceremony created by Dick Clark in 1973 and one of several annual major American music awards shows (among the others are the Grammy Awards, the MTV Video Music Awards etc.). Snoop Dogg has won the award once.

Year	Nominee / work	Award	Result
1995	Snoop Dogg	Favorite Rap/Hip-Hop Artist	Won

== APRA Music Awards ==
APRA Awards are award ceremonies run in Australia and New Zealand by Australasian Performing Right Association to recognise songwriting skills, sales and airplay performance by its members annually. Snoop Dogg has won the award once.

Year	Nominee / work	Award	Result
2011	"California Gurls" (with Katy Perry)	International Work of the Year	Won

== AVN Awards ==
The "AVN Awards" are movie awards sponsored and presented by the American adult video industry trade magazine AVN (Adult Video News) to honor exceptional performance in various aspects of the creation and marketing of American pornographic movies. They are called the "Oscars of porn". Snoop Dogg has won the award twice.

Year	Nominee / work	Award	Result
2002	"Snoop Dogg's Doggystyle"	Best Selling Title of the Year	Won
2004	"Snoop Dogg's Hustlaz: Diary of a Pimp"	Best Selling Title of the Year	Won

== Berlin Music Video Awards ==
The Berlin Music Video Awards is an international festival that promotes the art of music videos.

Year	Nominee/ work	Award	Result
2026	"Last Dance With Mary Jane"	Best Animation	Won

== BET Awards ==
The BET Awards were established in 2001 by the Black Entertainment Television network to celebrate African Americans and other minorities in music, acting, sports, and other fields of entertainment over the past year. Snoop Dogg has received one award from seven nominations.

Year	Nominee / work	Award	Result
2001	"The Next Episode" (with Dr. Dre & Nate Dogg)	Video of the Year	Nominated
2003	"Snoop Dogg"	Best Male Hip-Hop Artist	Nominated
2003	"Beautiful" (featuring Pharrell & Charlie Wilson)	Best Collaboration	Won
2005	"Snoop Dogg"	Best Male Hip-Hop Artist	Nominated
2005	"Drop It Like It's Hot" (featuring Pharrell)	Best Collaboration	Nominated
2008	"Snoop Dogg"	Best Male Hip Hop Artist	Nominated

=== BET Hip Hop Awards ===
The BET Hip Hop Awards are hosted annually by BET for hip hop performers, producers, and music video directors. Snoop Dogg has been nominated once.

Year	Nominee / work	Award	Result
2008	"Sexual Eruption"	Best Hip Hop Video	Nominated

== Billboard Music Awards ==
The Billboard Music Awards are sponsored by Billboard magazine and is held annually in December. The awards are based on sales data by Nielsen SoundScan and radio information by Nielsen Broadcast Data Systems. Snoop Dogg has been nominated three times with one win.

Year	Nominee / work	Award	Result
1994	Himself	#1 Male Artist	Won
2005	"Drop It Like It's Hot" (featuring Pharrell)	Rap Song of the Year	Nominated
2005	"Drop It Like It's Hot" (featuring Pharrell)	Ringtone of the Year	Nominated

=== Billboard R&B/Hip-Hop Awards ===
The Billboard R&B/Hip-Hop Awards reflect the performance of recordings on the Hot R&B/Hip-Hop Songs and Hot Rap Tracks. Snoop Dogg has won the award once from three nominations.

Year	Nominee / work	Award	Result
2005	"Drop It Like It's Hot" (featuring Pharrell)	Hot Rap Track	Won
2005	"Drop It Like It's Hot" (featuring Pharrell)	Top R&B/Hip-hop Singles - Airplay	Nominated
2005	"Drop It Like It's Hot" (featuring Pharrell)	Top R&B/Hip-hop Singles	Nominated

== Black Reel Awards ==
The "Black Reel Awards" began in 2000 and were designed to annually recognize and celebrate the achievements of black people in feature, independent and television films. Snoop Dogg has been nominated twice.

Year	Nominee / work	Award	Result
2002	"Just a Baby Boy" (featuring Tyrese & Mr. Tan)	Best Original or Adapted Song	Nominated
2003	"Undercova Funk (Give Up the Funk)" (featuring Bootsy Collins)	Best Original or Adapted Song	Nominated

== California Music Awards ==
The "California Music Awards" is a music and entertainment ceremony founded by BAM (magazine). The publication predominantly features R&B and hip-hop music artists. Snoop Dogg has been nominated once.

Year	Nominee / work	Award	Result
2003
2003	Paid tha Cost to Be da Boss	Outstanding Hip-Hop Album	Nominated

== Capricho Awards ==
Capricho Awards is a Brazilian award granted every year by the "Capricho" Magazine, Since 2001. Snoop Dogg has been nominated once.

Year	Nominee / work	Award	Result
2010	"California Gurls" (with Katy Perry)	International Song	Nominated

== Echo Awards ==
The "Echo Awards" an association of recording companies of Germany to recognize outstanding achievement in the music industry. Snoop Dogg has been nominated once.

Year	Nominee / work	Award	Result
2005
2005	R&G (Rhythm & Gangsta): The Masterpiece	International Hip-Hop/R&B Artist	Nominated

== Grammy Awards ==
The Grammy Awards are awarded annually by the National Academy of Recording Arts and Sciences of the United States for outstanding achievements in the music industry. Considered the highest music honor, the awards were established in 1958. Snoop Dogg has the third most Grammy nominations without a win, with 16.

Year	Nominee / work	Award	Result
1994	"Nuthin' but a 'G' Thang" (with Dr. Dre)	Best Rap Performance by a Duo or Group	Nominated
1995	"Gin and Juice"	Best Rap Solo Performance	Nominated
2000	"Still D.R.E." (with Dr. Dre)	Best Rap Performance by a Duo or Group	Nominated
2001	"The Next Episode" (with Dr. Dre)	Best Rap Performance by a Duo or Group	Nominated
2004	"Beautiful" (featuring Pharrell & Charlie Wilson)	Best Rap Song	Nominated
2004	"Beautiful" (featuring Pharrell & Charlie Wilson)	Best Rap/Sung Collaboration	Nominated
2005	"Drop It Like It's Hot" (featuring Pharrell)	Best Rap Performance by a Duo or Group	Nominated
2005	"Drop It Like It's Hot" (featuring Pharrell)	Best Rap Song	Nominated
2006	"I Wanna Love You" (with Akon)	Best Rap Sung/Collaboration	Nominated
2009	"Sexual Eruption"	Best Rap Solo Performance	Nominated
2009	"Sexual Eruption"	Best Rap Song	Nominated
2011	Teenage Dream (as featured artist)	Album of the Year	Nominated
2011	"California Gurls" (with Katy Perry)	Best Pop Collaboration with Vocals	Nominated
2013	"Young, Wild & Free" (with Wiz Khalifa featuring Bruno Mars)	Best Rap Song	Nominated
2014	Reincarnated	Best Reggae Album	Nominated
2016	To Pimp a Butterfly (as featured artist)	Album of the Year	Nominated

In 2023, Snoop Dogg posted on his Instagram stating "Snoop dogg. 20 nominations. 0 wins." This likely includes 4 nominations for producers on his work. As per the rules of the awards, Snoop Dogg would not have received an award for these nominations.

Year	Nominee / work	Award	Result
2011	Dr. Luke ("California Gurls" - Katy Perry ft. Snoop Dogg)	Producer of the Year, Non-Classical	Nominated
2012	Danger Mouse ("If I was You (OMG)" - Far East Movement ft. Snoop Dogg)	Producer of the Year, Non-Classical	Nominated
2013	Diplo ("La La La" - Snoop Lion)	Producer of the Year, Non-Classical	Nominated
2014	Ariel Rechtshaid ("reincarnated" - Snoop Lion)	Producer of the Year, Non-Classical	Nominated

== Hollywood Walk of Fame ==
Year	Nominee / work	Award	Result
2018	Snoop Dogg	Hollywood Walk of Fame	Won

== International Dance Music Awards ==
The International Dance Music Awards are an awards show for the dance and electronic music industry. Snoop Dogg has won the award once.

Year	Nominee / work	Award	Result
2005	"Drop It Like It's Hot" (featuring Pharrell)	Best Rap/Hip-Hop Dance Track	Won

== MOBO Awards ==
The MOBO Awards (an acronym for "Music of Black Origin") were established in 1996 by Kanya King. They are held annually in the United Kingdom to recognize artists of any race or nationality performing music of black origin. Snoop Dogg has won the award once from three nominations.

Year	Nominee / work	Award	Result
2005	"Drop It Like It's Hot" (featuring Pharrell)	Best Single	Nominated
2005	"Drop It Like It's Hot" (featuring Pharrell)	Best Video	Won
2011	Snoop Dogg	Best International Act	Nominated

== MTV Movie Awards ==
The MTV Movie Awards were established in 1992 and is a film awards show presented annually on MTV. Snoop Dogg has won the award once.

Year	Nominee / work	Award	Result
2002	Training Day	Best Cameo	Won

== MTV Awards ==
=== MTV Video Music Awards ===
The MTV Video Music Awards were established in 1984 by MTV to celebrate the top music videos of the year. Snoop Dogg has won the award twice from eight nominations.

Year	Nominee / work	Award	Result
1994	"Doggy Dogg World"	Best Rap Video	Won
2001	"Lay Low"	Best Rap Video	Nominated
2003	"Beautiful"	Best Hip-Hop Video	Nominated
2005	"Drop It Like It's Hot" (featuring Pharrell)	Best Hip-Hop Video	Nominated
2005	"Drop It Like It's Hot" (featuring Pharrell)	Viewer's Choice	Nominated
2005	"Drop It Like It's Hot" (featuring Pharrell)	Video of the Year	Nominated
2013	"No Guns Allowed" (featuring Drake & Cori B.)	Best Video with a Social Message	Nominated
2015	"So Many Pros"	Best Art Direction	Won

=== MTV Australia Awards ===
The MTV Australia Awards were established in 2005 and is Australia's first awards show to celebrate both local and international acts. Snoop Dogg has won the award twice from three nominations.

Year	Nominee / work	Award	Result
2006	"Drop It Like It's Hot" (featuring Pharrell)	Best Hip Hop Video	Won
2007	"That's That" (featuring R. Kelly)	Best Hip Hop Video	Won
2007	"Buttons" (with The Pussycat Dolls)	Best Hook-Up	Nominated

=== MTV Europe Music Awards ===
The MTV Europe Music Awards were established in 1994 by MTV Europe to celebrate the most popular music videos in Europe. Snoop Dogg has won the award once from eight nominations.

Year	Nominee / work	Award	Result
2005	Snoop Dogg	Best Male Act	Nominated
2005	Snoop Dogg	Best Hip Hop Act	Won
2005	"Signs" (featuring Justin Timberlake)	Best Song	Nominated
2008	"Sexual Eruption"	Video Star	Nominated
2010	Snoop Dogg	Best Hip Hop	Nominated
2011	Snoop Dogg	Best Hip Hop	Nominated
2011	Snoop Dogg	Best World Stage	Nominated
2012	Snoop Dogg	Best World Stage	Nominated

=== MTV Video Music Awards Japan ===
The MTV Video Music Awards Japan were established in 2002 to celebrate the most popular music videos from Japanese and international artists. Snoop Dogg has been nominated three times.

Year	Nominee / work	Award	Result
2011	"California Gurls" (with Katy Perry)	Best Collaboration	Nominated
2011	"California Gurls" (with Katy Perry)	Best Pop Video	Nominated
2011	"California Gurls" (with Katy Perry)	Video of the Year	Nominated

== MuchMusic Video Awards ==
The MuchMusic Video Awards are annual awards presented by the Canadian music video channel MuchMusic to honor the year's best music videos. Snoop Dogg has been nominated three times and won once.

Year	Nominee / work	Award	Result
2005	"Drop It Like It's Hot" (featuring Pharrell)	Best International Artist Video	Nominated
2010	"Hot Girl" (with Belly)	VideoFACT Award	Won
2011	"California Gurls" (with Katy Perry)	Most Watched Video	Nominated

== O Music Awards ==
The "O Music Awards" (commonly abbreviated as the OMAs) is an awards show presented by Viacom to honor music, technology and intersection between the two. Snoop Dogg has been nominated once.

Year	Nominee / work	Award	Result
2012
2012	"Snoop Dogg"	Most Extreme Fan Outreach	Nominated

== People's Choice Awards ==
The People's Choice Awards is an annual award show from pop culture on Movie, Television, and Music. Snoop Dogg has received one nomination .

Year	Nominee / work	Award	Result
2012	"Snoop Dogg"	Favorite Hip-Hop Artist	Nominated

== Primetime Emmy Awards ==
The Primetime Emmy Awards are bestowed by the Academy of Television Arts & Sciences (ATAS), in recognition of excellence in U.S. American primetime television programming. Snoop Dogg has received two nominations and one win.

Year	Nominee / work	Award	Result
2017	Martha & Snoop's Potluck Dinner Party	Outstanding Host for a Reality or Competition Program	Nominated
2022	The Pepsi Super Bowl LVI Halftime Show Starring Dr. Dre, Snoop Dogg, Mary J. Blige, Eminem, Kendrick Lamar And 50 Cent	Outstanding Variety Special (Live)	Won

== Radio Music Awards ==
The "Radio Music Awards" was an annual U.S. award show that honored the year's most successful songs on mainstream radio. Nominations were based on the amount of airplay recording artists receive on radio stations in various formats using chart information compiled by Mediabase. Snoop Dogg has been nominated once.

Year	Nominee / work	Award	Result
2005	"Drop It Like It's Hot" (featuring Pharrell)	Song of the Year/Urban and Rhythmic Radio	Nominated

== Rolling Stone ==
The Rolling Stone is an American magazine published every two weeks and focused on music, liberal politics, and popular culture.

Year	Nominee / work	Award	Result
1994	"Snoop Dogg"	Annual Critics Poll	Won

== Soul Train Music Awards ==
The Soul Train Music Awards is an annual award show aired in national broadcast syndication that honors the best in African American music and entertainment established in 1987. Snoop Dogg has been nominated once.

Year	Nominee / work	Award	Result
1995	Doggystyle	Best Rap Album	Won
2005	"Drop It Like It's Hot" (featuring Pharrell)	Best R&B/Soul or Rap Dance Cut	Won

== Source Awards ==
The Source Awards is a United States–based, monthly full-color magazine covering hip-hop music, politics, and culture, founded in 1988. Snoop Dogg has won the award six times of 12 nominations.

Year	Nominee / work	Award	Result
1994	"Snoop Dogg"	New Artist of the Year (Solo)	Won
1994	"Snoop Dogg"	Lyricist of the Year	Won
1995	"Snoop Dogg"	Artist of the Year (Solo)	Won
1995	"Murder Was the Case"	Video of the Year	Won
1999	"Snoop Dogg"	Artist of the Year (Solo)	Nominated
2000	"Snoop Dogg"	Artist of the Year (Solo)	Nominated
2000	"Tha Eastsidaz"	New Artist of the Year	Won
2000	"Still D.R.E." (with Dr. Dre)	Single of the Year	Nominated
2001	Tha Last Meal	Album of the Year	Nominated
2001	"Snoop Dogg"	Artist of the Year (Solo)	Nominated
2001	"Snoop Dogg"	Live Performer of the Year	Nominated
2001	"Snoop Dogg (What's My Name Pt. 2)"	Music Video of the Year	Nominated

== Sports Emmy Awards ==
The Sports Emmy Awards are part of the extensive range of Emmy Awards for artistic and technical merit for the American television industry. Bestowed by the National Academy of Television Arts and Sciences (NATAS), the Sports Emmys are presented in recognition of excellence in American sports television programming. He won two awards.

Year	Nominee / work	Award	Result
2025	Games of the XXXIII Olympiad	Outstanding Live Special – Championship Event	Won
2025	Games of the XXXIII Olympiad	Outstanding Interactive Experience	Won

== Stony Awards ==
The High Times Stony Awards (a.k.a. the Stonys), sponsored by High Times magazine, celebrate the "highest and stoniest" movies and TV shows of the year. Snoop Dogg has won the award once.

Year	Nominee / work	Award	Result
2002	"Snoop Dogg"	Stoner of the Year	Won

== Teen Choice Awards ==
Year	Nominated artist and works	Award	Result
2014	"Wiggle" (with Jason Derulo)	Choice Music: Summer Song	Nominated

== Urban Fashion Awards ==
Snoop Dogg has won the award once.

Year	Nominee / work	Award	Result
2002	"Snoop Dogg Clothing"	Best Celebrity Clothing Line	Won

== Vibe Awards ==
Snoop Dogg has been nominated twice.

Year	Nominee / work	Award	Result
2003	"Beautiful" (featuring Pharrell & Charlie Wilson)	Coolest Collaboration	Nominated
2003	"Beautiful" (featuring Pharrell & Charlie Wilson)	Hottest Hook	Nominated
2003	"Beautiful" (featuring Pharrell & Charlie Wilson)	Reelest Video	Nominated
2004	"Drop It Like It's Hot" (featuring Pharrell)	Hottest Hook	Nominated

== World Music Awards ==
The World Music Awards was an international awards show founded in 1989 that annually honored recording artists based on worldwide sales figures provided by the International Federation of the Phonographic Industry (IFPI). Snoop Dogg has been nominated once.

Year	Nominee / work	Award	Result
2005	Snoop Dogg	Best-Selling Male R&B Award	Nominated

== WWE Hall of Fame ==
Snoop Dogg was announced as an inductee into the WWE Hall of Fame Class of 2016 on March 28, 2016. He is a member of the Hall's "celebrity wing". He was inducted on April 2 by John Cena.

Image	Recipient (Birth name)	Occupation	Inducted by	Appearances
	Snoop Dogg (Calvin Broadus Jr)	Rapper	John Cena	Master of Ceremonies for the Playboy BunnyMania Lumberjill match at WrestleMania XXIV and accompanied Sasha Banks to the ring for her match at WrestleMania 32. Raw guest host in 2009 and guest star in 2015
