= Bing Worthington =

American executive (1979–2024)

- Born: May 4, 1979; United States
- Died: February 16, 2024 (aged 44); Orange County, California, United States
- Occupations: Businessman, film producer
- Years active: 2004–2024
- Relatives: Snoop Dogg (half-brother)

Bing Crosby Worthington Jr. (May 4, 1979 – February 16, 2024) was an American entertainment industry executive and businessman, whose name is credited with film and sound recording contributions to projects including, Snoop Dogg Presents: Tha Eastsidaz, Big Snoop Dogg Raw 'N Uncut Vol. 1 and Van Wilder: The Rise of Taj. He was the younger brother of music mogul Snoop Dogg. In a 2016 interview with Vice News, when asked to describe his career with one word, Worthington called it "blessed".

On February 16, 2024, a TMZ report attributed news of Worthington's death to the Instagram account for the rapper Snoop Dogg. "Until we meet again," Snoop Dogg wrote, in part. Other mainstream news outlets reported Worthington's death was confirmed by the Southern California Orange County Sheriff's Department. Worthington was 44.

On March 1, 2024, a funeral service was held at the Saban Theatre in Beverly Hills, California. He was interred at Inglewood Park Cemetery.
