= From tha Streets 2 tha Suites =

Studio album by Snoop Dogg
- Released: April 20, 2021
- Recorded: 2006 ("Look Around"); 2020–21
- Genre: West Coast hip-hop; gangsta rap; G-funk
- Length: 36:46
- Label: Doggy Style
- Producer: Amplified; DJ Battlecat; Nottz; ProHoeZak; Rick Rock; Soopafly; The Mekanix

Snoop Dogg chronology
I Wanna Thank Me (2019)	From tha Streets 2 tha Suites (2021)	Snoop Dogg Presents Algorithm (2021)

Singles from From tha Streets 2 tha Suites
- 1. "CEO" Released: March 19, 2021; 2. "Roaches in My Ashtray" Released: April 2, 2021; 3. "Say It Witcha Booty" Released: April 16, 2021

From tha Streets 2 tha Suites is the eighteenth studio album by American rapper Snoop Dogg. It was released on April 20, 2021 through Doggy Style Records. The album was released to celebrate 420.

== Background ==
Snoop Dogg announced the album on March 29, 2021, along with the video for the single "Roaches in My Ashtray", which was released on April 2. He announced the release date for the album on April 7, 2021, via Instagram.

It features 10 tracks. Production was handled by Amplified, DJ Battlecat, DJ Camper, Nottz, ProHoeZak, Rick Rock, Soopafly, Terrace Martin and The Mekanix. It features guest appearances from J-Black, ProHoeZak, Devin the Dude, Kokane, Larry June, Mozzy and Tha Eastsidaz.

== Critical reception ==
Professional ratings
Review scores
Source	Rating
Beats Per Minute	71%
Pitchfork	6.9/10

Chase McMullen of Beats Per Minute wrote: "A low-stakes, blessedly brief affair that’s all the more fun for its focus and trimmed run time, with tha Doggfather clearly seeming to have listened to shots fired at his mostly fine, yet bloated I Wanna Thank Me". Paul A. Thompson of Pitchfork said that it "reminds [him] of the simple pleasures of [Snoop Dogg's] still-virtuosic voice".

== Commercial performance ==
From tha Streets 2 tha Suites became Snoop Dogg’s least commercially successful album, failing to chart in every territory and only selling 935 album-equivalent units in its first week.

== Track listing ==
Track listing adapted from Apple Music.

No.	Title	Writer(s)	Producer(s)	Length
1.	"CEO"	Calvin Broadus Jr.; Ricardo Thomas	Rick Rock	3:25
2.	"Roaches in My Ashtray" (featuring ProHoeZak)	Broadus Jr.; Simon McKinley	ProHoeZak	3:32
3.	"Gang Signs" (featuring Mozzy)	Broadus Jr.; Timothy Cornell Patterson	The Mekanix	4:54
4.	"Talk Dat Shit to Me" (featuring Kokane)	Broadus Jr.; Jerry Buddy Long Jr.	DJ Battlecat; Amplified	3:29
5.	"Sittin' on Blades"	Broadus Jr.	DJ Battlecat; Terrace Martin; DJ Camper	3:31
6.	"Say It Witcha Booty" (featuring ProHoeZak)	Broadus Jr.; McKinley	ProHoeZak	2:42
7.	"Get Yo Bread Up" (featuring Larry June)	Broadus Jr.; Larry Eugene Hendricks	The Mekanix	4:12
8.	"Fetty in the Bag" (featuring Tha Eastsidaz)	Broadus Jr.; Keiwan Spillman; Tracy Lamar Davis; Aaron Parra	Amplified	3:15
9.	"Look Around" (featuring J-Black)	Broadus Jr.; Jeret Griffin-Black	Nottz	3:38
10.	"Left My Weed" (featuring Devin the Dude and J-Black)	Broadus Jr.; Devin Copeland; Griffin-Black; Bush	Soopafly	4:08
Total length:				36:46
