= Tha Dogg Pound discography =

This is the discography of American rap duo Tha Dogg Pound.

== Albums ==
=== Studio albums ===
Year	Album details	Peak chart positions		Sales	Certifications
Year	Album details	U.S.	U.S. R&B	Sales	Certifications
1995	Dogg Food: Released: October 31, 1995; Label: Death Row, Interscope, Priority; Format: CD, LP, cassette, digital download	1	1	US: 2,000,000	RIAA: 2× Platinum; MC: Gold
2001	Dillinger & Young Gotti: Released: May 1, 2001; Label: D.P.G.; Format: CD, cassette, digital download	124	26	US: 72,000	
2005	Dillinger & Young Gotti II: Tha Saga Continuez...: Released: November 1, 2005; Label: Gangsta Advisory; Format: CD, digital download	—	66	US: 162,390	
2006	Cali Iz Active: Released: June 27, 2006; Label: Doggystyle, Koch; Format: CD, LP, digital download	28	5	US: 642,000	
2007	Dogg Chit: Released: March 27, 2007; Label: Gangsta Advisory, Koch; Format: CD, digital download	77	24	US: 80,000	
2009	That Was Then, This Is Now: Released: November 24, 2009; Label: Gangsta Advisory; Format: CD, digital download	146	38	US: 8,500	
2010	100 Wayz: Released: August 17, 2010; Label: Felder; Format: CD, digital download	—	83	US: 17,000	
2021	DPG 4 Life: Released: August 20, 2021; Label: Felder; Format: digital download	—	—		
2024	W.A.W.G. (We All We Got): Released: May 31, 2024; Label: Death Row, Gamma; Format: CD,LP,Cassette,digital download	—	—		

=== Compilation albums ===
Year	Album details	Chart positions			
Year	Album details	US	US R&B	US Rap	US Ind
2001	2002: Released: July 31, 2001; Label: Death Row; Format: CD, LP, cassette, digital download	36	15	*	2
2004	The Last of Tha Pound: Released: April 27, 2004; Label: Gangsta Advisory; Format: CD, LP, digital download	194	32	*	—
2010	Keep On Ridin: Released: May 18, 2010; Label: Gangsta Advisory; Format: CD, digital download	—	—	—	—
2012	Doggy Bag: Released: July 3, 2012; Label: WIDEawake, Death Row; Format: CD, digital download	—	—	—	—

== Extended plays ==
Year	EP details
2008	Let's Ryde 2Night: Released: March 22, 2008; Label: Dogg Pound Online, INgrooves

== Mixtapes ==
- Full Circle (Dogg Pound Gangsta Grillz) (hosted by DJ Drama) (2008)
- DPGC'Ology (hosted by DJ Nik Bean) (2012)

== Singles ==
Year	Song	Chart positions			Album
Year	Song	U.S.	U.S. R&B	U.S. Rap	Album
1994	"Doggy Dogg World" (Snoop Doggy Dogg featuring Tha Dogg Pound & Tha Dramatics)				Doggystyle
1994	"What Would You Do" (featuring Snoop Doggy Dogg & Jewell)	—	—	—	Murder Was the Case OST/ Natural Born Killers OST
1995	"Respect"	—	35^{[A]}	—	Dogg Food
1995	"New York, New York" (featuring Snoop Doggy Dogg)	—	51^{[A]}	—	Dogg Food
1995	"Let's Play House" (featuring Michel'le)	45	21	5	Dogg Food
1996	"Music Makes Me High" (L.T. Hutton Remix)" (Lost Boyz featuring Dogg Pound & Canibus)				Non-album single
1996	""Nothin' but the Cavi Hit" (Mack 10 featuring Dogg Pound)	38	24	3	Rhyme & Reason (soundtrack)
1997	"Knick Knack Patty Wack"	—	—	—	In tha Beginning...There Was Rap
1998	"The Comeback" (TQ featuring Dogg Pound)				They Never Saw Me Coming
2001	"Coastin'"	—	—	—	Dillinger & Young Gotti
2005	"Push Bacc"	—	—	—	Dillinger & Young Gotti II: Tha Saga Continuez...
2006	"Cali Iz Active" (featuring Snoop Dogg)	—	114	—	Cali Iz Active
2006	"Candy" (Snoop Dogg featuring E-40, MC Eiht, Goldie Loc & Dogg Pound)				Tha Blue Carpet Treatment
2007	"Vibe" (featuring Snoop Dogg)	—	—	—	Dogg Chit
2008	"Cheat" (featuring Pharrell)	—	—	—	That Was Then, This Is Now
2009	"Ya'll Know What I'm Doin'" (featuring Turf Talk)	—	—	—	That Was Then, This Is Now
2021	"Let's Roll'"	—	—	—	DPG 4 Life
2021	"We Rollin'" (featuring Kaydence)	—	—	—	DPG 4 Life
2021	"Bottom Bitch" (featuring Tenah Nassar)	—	—	—	DPG 4 Life
2021	"Nice & Slow" (featuring Snoop Dogg & Shon Lawon)	—	—	—	DPG 4 Life

- A. Did not chart on the Hot R&B/Hip-Hop chart (Billboard rules at the time prevented album cuts from charting). Chart peak listed here represents Hot R&B/Hip-Hop Airplay charts data.

== Guest appearances ==
List of non-single guest appearances, with other performing artists, showing year released and album name
Title	Year	Other artist(s)	Album
"Bitches Ain't Shit"	1992	Dr. Dre, Snoop Doggy Dogg, Jewell	The Chronic
"Niggaz Dont Give a Fuck"	1993	—N/a	Poetic Justice (soundtrack)
"Serial Killa"	1993	Snoop Doggy Dogg. RBX	Doggystyle
"For All My Niggaz & Bitches"	1993	Snoop Doggy Dogg, The Lady of Rage	Doggystyle
"Big Pimpin'"	1994	Nate Dogg, Snoop Doggy Dogg	Above the Rim (soundtrack)
"Dogg Pound 4 Life"	1994	—N/a	Above the Rim (soundtrack)
"Who Got Some Gangsta Shit?"	1994	Lil C-Style, Snoop Dogg, Swoop G	Murder was the Case (soundtrack)
"Come Up to My Room"	1994	Jodeci	Murder was the Case (soundtrack)
"Got My Mind Made Up"	1996	2Pac, Method Man & Redman	All Eyez on Me
"Just Doggin'	1996	—N/a	Sunset Park (soundtrack)
"Get On Up (Gangsta Gangsta Re-Mix)"	1996	Jodeci	Non-album single
"Slip N Slide (Remix)"	1996	Danny Boy	Non-album single
"Groupie"	1996	Snoop Dogg, Charlie Wilson, Nate Dogg, Warren G	Tha Doggfather
"Blueberry"	1996	Snoop Dogg, Prince Ital Joe, Bad Azz, Techniec	Tha Doggfather
"Just Watching" ~~Unreleased~~	1996	Snoop Dogg, 2Pac, Charlie Wilson	Tha Doggfather
"I'll Do It"	Kausion	Supercop (soundtrack)	
"Can You Handle It?"	1997	Heavy D, MC Gruff	Waterbed Hev
"Hollywood Bank Robbery"	1997	Tha Gang, Snoop Dogg	Gang Related – The Soundtrack
"Brownsville II Long Beach"	1998	Heltah Skeltah	Magnum Force
"My Buddy"	1998	Luniz	Caught Up (soundtrack)
"We Came to Rock Your Body"	1998	The Click, Snoop Dogg	Boss Ballin' 2: The Mob Bosses
"Puppy Love"	1998	Nate Dogg, Snoop Dogg	G-Funk Classics, Vols. 1 & 2
"Why Oh Why"	1999	Warren G	I Want It All
"Clockin' C Notes"	1999	Made Men	Classic: Limited Edition
"Sweet Love"	1999	Rappin 4 Tay	Introduction to Mackin'
"Don't Be Foolish"	1999	Snoop Dogg	Foolish (soundtrack)
"O.G. to Me	2000	Scarface, Jayo Felony	The Last of a Dying Breed
"Change the Game (Remix)"	2001	DJ Clue?, Jay-Z, Beanie Sigel, Memphis Bleek	The Professional 2
"Sadity"	2006	Too Short	Blow the Whistle
"Cali Dro"	2006	Birdman & Lil' Wayne	Like Father, Like Son
"Bang"	2006	The Game	Doctor's Advocate
"My Hood"	2009	Capone-n-Noreaga, Uncle Murda, Maino, Clipse	Channel 10
"On Sight"	2009	The Alchemist, Lady of Rage	Chamical Warfare
"What You Smoking On"	2012	E-40, Snoop Dogg, Kokane	The Block Brochure: Welcome to the Soil 3
"Big Body"	2016	Schoolboy Q	Blank Face LP

== Tha Dogg Pound songs on members' solo albums ==
=== Daz Dillinger ===
- Retaliation, Revenge and Get Back
  - "Gang Bangin' Ass Criminal" (also featuring Soopafly, Tray Deee, Bad Azz, Techniec)
  - "It's Going Down"
  - "Our Daily Bread"
  - "Initiated" (also featuring 2Pac and Outlawz)
- R.A.W.
  - "I'd Rather Lie 2 Ya" (also featuring Tray Deee)
  - "On tha Grind" (later appeared on Kurupt's Space Boogie: Smoke Oddessey as "On da Grind")
  - "R.A.W."
  - "Feels Good" (also featuring LaToiya Williams)
  - "My System" (also featuring Tha Mactress)
- Game for Sale (with JT the Bigga Figga)
  - "Change the Game" (also featuring Jay-Z)
- This Is the Life I Lead
  - "Gangsta's Prerogative" (also featuring Roscoe)
  - "For the Moment"
- So So Gangsta
  - "Money on My Mind"
- Gangsta Party
  - "Gettin' Money" (also featuring E-40)
- Only on the Left Side
  - "Thiz How We Live"
- Matter of Dayz
  - "Matter of Dayz"
  - "X'posed 2 tha Game"
- D.A.Z.
  - "My Homegirl"

=== Kurupt ===
- Kuruption
  - "Make Some Noize"
  - "Fresh"
- Tha Streetz Iz a Mutha
  - "Loose Cannons" (also featuring Xzibit)
  - "Who Ride wit Us"
  - "Represent Dat G.C." (also featuring Snoop Dogg, Soopafly, Tray Deee, Jayo Felony, Butch Cassidy)
  - "Tequila" (also featuring T-Moe, Nivea)
  - "Tha Streetz Iz a Mutha" (also featuring Big Pimpin')
  - "Ya Can't Trust Nobody"
  - "Your Gyrl Friend"
  - "I Ain't Shit Without My Homeboyz" (also featuring Soopafly, Crooked I, Baby S)
- Space Boogie: Smoke Oddessey
  - "On da Grind" (appeared earlier on Daz Dillinger's R.A.W. as "On tha Grind")
  - "Gangstaz"
  - "Da World"
- Same Day, Different Shit
  - "As Time Fly By"
  - "Gangstaz Part 2"
  - "Ain't That Somethin'"
- The Frank and Jess Story (with Roscoe)
  - "Game Been Missin'"
  - "All I Need"
  - "Smashin'"
- Streetlights
  - "I'm Burnt"
  - "In Gotti We Trust"
  - "Questions"
  - "Yessir"
