= Daz Dillinger discography =

This is the discography of Daz Dillinger, an American rapper and record producer.

Since 1998, Daz Dillinger has sold over 1 million albums in the U.S. and over 1.2 million worldwide. With Tha Dogg Pound he sold over 4 million copies in the U.S.

== Albums ==
=== Studio albums ===
Year	Title	Chart positions				Sales	Certifications
Year	Title	US	US R&B	US Rap	US Ind	Sales	Certifications
1998	Retaliation, Revenge and Get Back: Released: March 31, 1998; Label: Death Row, Priority	8	2	*	—	US: 880,00; World: 1,200,000	
2000	R.A.W.: Released: August 29, 2000; Label: D.P.G.	—	87	*	38	US: 105,000; World: 140,000	
2002	This Is the Life I Lead: Released: June 11, 2002; Label: D.P.G.	109	15	*	6	US: 65,000; World: 80,000	
2003	DPGC: U Know What I'm Throwin' Up: Released: May 6, 2003; Label: Gangsta Advisory	—	35	*	13	US: 30,000; World: 49,500	
2004	I Got Love in These Streetz: Released: September 7, 2004; Label: Gangsta Advisory	—	—	*	—	US: 10,000	
2005	Tha Dogg Pound Gangsta LP: Released: January 25, 2005; Label: Gangsta Advisory	—	82	—	28	US: 15,300; World: 18,000	
2005	Gangsta Crunk: Released: May 31, 2005; Label: Gangsta Advisory	—	—	—	—	US: 5,500; World: 10,000	
2006	So So Gangsta: Released: September 12, 2006; Label: So So Def, Virgin	35	6	2	—	US: 350,000; World: 475,000	
2007	Gangsta Party: Released: September 25, 2007; Label: High Powered	—	82	—	—	US: 12,000; World: 15,500	
2008	Only on the Left Side: Released: August 12, 2008; Label: D.P.G., Fontana	—	38	17	46	US: 40,000; World: 50,000	
2009	Public Enemiez: Released: August 11, 2009; Label: D.P.G., Gangsta Advisory	—	—	—	—	US: 2,500; World: 3,000	
2010	Matter of Dayz: Released: November 30, 2010; Label: Gangsta Advisory	—	—	—	—	US: 1.000; World: 1,200	
2011	D.A.Z.: Released: April 19, 2011; Label: Gangsta Advisory	—	—	—	—	US: 8,250; World: 10.600	
2012	Witit Witit: Released: December 4, 2012; Label: Dogg Pound Records	—	—	—	—	US: 1,400; World: 1,650	
2013	West Coast Gangsta Shit (with WC): Released: June 19, 2013; Label: DPG Online, Dub C Online, Empire Distribution	—	—	—	—	US: 46,000; World: 60,000	
2014	Weed Money: Released: April 22, 2014; Label: D.P.G. Recordz, Felder Entertainment Inc.	—	—	—	—	US: 2,000; World: 2,100	
2018	Dazamataz: Released: February 16, 2018; Label: Felder Entertainment Inc.	—	—	—	—	US: 5,000; World: 6,000	
2018	Smoke Me Out: Released: April 19, 2018; Label: Dazamataz	—	—	—	—	US: 500; World: 565	
2023	Dat Nigga Daz: Released: May 25, 2023; Label: Daz Dillinger Recordingz	—	—	—	—	US: 2,000; World: 2,300	
2024	The Adventures of Dilly tha Dogg: Released: December 15, 2024; Label: Daz Dillinger Recordingz	—	—	—	—	US: —; World: —	
2025	Retaliation, Revenge and Get Back 2: Released: June 15, 2025; Label: Daz Dillinger Recordingz	—	—	—	—	US: —; World: —	
2025	Retaliation, Revenge and Get Back 3: Released: September 11, 2025; Label: Daz Dillinger Recordingz	—	—	—	—	US: —; World: —	
2025	Rowtation: Released: November 23, 2025; Label: Daz Dillinger Recordingz	—	—	—	—	US: —; World: —	
2026	Valentine's Day: The Album: Released: February 14, 2026; Label: Daz Dillinger Recordingz	—	—	—	—	US: —; World: —	
2026	Mo'Weed 4 Sale: Released: April 20, 2026; Label: Daz Dillinger Recordingz	—	—	—	—	US: —; World: —	

=== Compilation albums ===
Year	Title
2001	Who Ride wit Us: Tha Compalation, Vol. 1: Released: October 30, 2001; Label: D.P.G.
2002	To Live and Die in CA: Released: October 1, 2002; Label: D.P.G.
2002	Who Ride wit Us: Tha Compalation, Vol. 2: Released: October 29, 2002; Label: D.P.G.
2008	Who Ride wit Us Vol. 3: Released: August 12, 2008; Label: D.P.G.
2009	Who Ride wit Us Vol. 4: Released: December 1, 2009; Label: D.P.G.
2013	Who Ride wit Us Vol. 5: Released: February 13, 2013; Label: D.P.G.
2015	Who Ride wit Us Vol. 6: Released: September 25, 2015; Label: D.P.G.

=== Collaboration albums ===
Year	Title	Chart positions	
Year	Title	US R&B	US Ind
2001	Long Beach 2 Fillmoe (with JT the Bigga Figga): Released: January 16, 2001; Label: Gangsta Advisory, D.P.G., Black Market	70	30
2001	Game for Sale (with JT the Bigga Figga): Released: March 6, 2001; Label: Get Low	80	37
2003	Southwest (with Nuwine): Released: June 24, 2003; Label: Wine-o	—	—
2009	Get That Paper (with Fratthouse): Released: October 6, 2009; Label: D.P.G.	—	—
2013	West Coast Gangsta Shit (with WC): Released: June 19, 2013; Label: DPG Online, Dub C Online, Empire Distribution	—	—
2016	Cuzznz (with Snoop Dogg): Released: January 15, 2016; Label: Felder Entertainment Inc.	—	—
2022	Guidelinez (with Capone): Released: July 22, 2022; Label: Akasi Collection	—	—
2023	The Legacy (with Lil Eazy-E): Released: March 22, 2023; Label: D.P.G., Rich & Ruthless	—	—

=== EPs ===
Year	Title
2001	Makaveli & Dillinger Don't Go 2 Sleep (with Makaveli): Released: December 24, 2001; Label: D.P.G., Makaveli
2002	I Got Love in These Streetz (Re-released in 2004 as "I Got Love in These Streetz - The Album": Released: 2002; Label: D.P.G.
2003	Dogg Catcha: Released: July 22, 2003; Label: D.P.G.
2013	Tha City (with Los): Released: March 26, 2013; Label: Z.M. Music Group
2020	ATLA (with Big Gipp): Released: April 19, 2020; Label: Dilly Records
2023	Molly Whop: Released: October 20, 2023; Label: Daz Dillinger Recordingz

=== Instrumental albums ===
Year	Title
2005	Samplin to the Beat of the Drum (with Dion Neuble): Released: September 6, 2005; Label: Gangsta Advisory
2009	Only on the Leftside (Instrumental Album): Released: February 24, 2009; Label: Dogg Pound Online

=== Mixtapes ===
- DPG: Till the Day I Die Mixtape (2004)
- So So Gangsta - The Mixtape (2005)
- West Coast Gangstas - Starring: Tha Dogg Pound (Hosted by DJ Kurupt) (2005)
- Dillinger & Makaveli - Tribute: Streetz of LA Special Edition (Hosted by DJ Nik Bean) (2009)
- Dilly Tha Dogg - Bacc 2 Tha Old School Vol. 1 (2013)

== Singles ==
=== Solo singles ===
List of singles as lead artist, with other performing artists and selected chart positions, showing year released and album name
Title	Year	Peak chart positions		Album
Title	Year	US R&B	US Rap	Album
"Put the Monkey in It" (with Soopafly)	1997	101	36	Nothing to Lose soundtrack
"These Days" (with Nate Dogg)	1997	—	—	Gang Related soundtrack and G-Funk Classics, Vol. 1 & 2
"Keep It Gangsta"	2002	—	—	This Is the Life I Lead
"Dogg Catcha" (featuring Soopafly)	2003	—	—	DPGC: U Know What I'm Throwin' Up
"I'm Hot" (with Jermaine Dupri, Young Capone and T-Rock)	2005	—	—	Young, Fly & Flashy, Vol. 1
"Daz Thang" (featuring Kurupt)	2006	—	—	Non-album single
"On Some Real Shit" (featuring Rick Ross)	2006	90	—	So So Gangsta
"—" denotes a recording that did not chart or was not released in that territory.

=== As featured artist ===
List of singles as featured artist, with other performing artists and selected chart positions, showing year released and album name
Title	Year	Peak chart positions			Album
Title	Year	US	US R&B	US Rap	Album
"Papi Chulo" (Funkdoobiest featuring Daz Dillinger, Cobra Red and Nina Lares)	1997	110	—	30	The Troubleshooters
"Who Ride wit' Us" (Kurupt featuring Bad Azz, Blaqthoven, Dimen and Daz Dillinger)	2000	—	62	—	Tha Streetz Iz a Mutha
"I Luv" (Too Short featuring Daz Dillinger, Scarface and Trick Daddy)	2001	—	—	—	Chase the Cat
"Live My Life (Leave Me Alone)" (Cam'ron featuring Daz Dillinger)	2002	—	—	—	Come Home with Me
"X-Tra Hot" (Benzino featuring Daz Dillinger and Jewell)	2003	—	—	—	Redemption
"Sound of My Heata" (Mr. Shadow featuring Daz Dillinger)	2003	—	—	—	A Name You Kan't Touch
"Burning Down the House" (Spanish F.L.Y. featuring Daz Dillinger)	2004	—	—	—	Crimes of Agony
"Tonight" (Young Gunz featuring Daz Dillinger)	2005	—	—	—	Brothers from Another
"—" denotes a recording that did not chart.

== Guest appearances ==
List of non-single guest appearances, with other performing artists, showing year released and album name
Title	Year	Other artist(s)	Album
Downtown Assassins"	1996	Snoop Dogg, Big Tray Deee	Tha Doggfather
"Don't Try to Play Me Homey"	1997	None	Gridlock'd soundtrack
"Money Makes the World Go Round"	1997	Scarface, Devin the Dude, K.B.	The Untouchable
"Rough Rugged & Raw"	1997	The Lady of Rage, Snoop Dogg	Necessary Roughness
"Mash for Our Dreams"	1997	Storm, Young Noble	Gang Related soundtrack
"Gang Related"	1997	CJ Mac, WC, Big Tray Deee	Gang Related soundtrack
"What's Ya Fantasy"	1997	Storm, Young Noble, Napoleon	Gang Related soundtrack
"Gon' Hurt Somebody"	1998	None	Straight Outta Cali
"Poor Man Cry"	1998	Barrington Levy, Crooked I, Snoop Dogg, Soopafly	Living Dangerously
"Like That"	1998	WC, CJ Mac, Ice Cube	The Shadiest One
"Tommy"	1998	Snoop Dogg	Smokefest Underground
"Way Too Crazy"	1998	Big Tray Deee, Jayo Felony	Rush Hour soundtrack
"Roll wit Us"	1998	None	Westside Riderz, Vol. 1
"Murder and Daz"	1999	C-Murder	Bossalinie
"Turf Stories"	1999	Mac Shawn, Big Tray Deee	Turf Stories
"I Thought You Knew"	1999	Mac Shawn, E-40	Suge Knight Represents: Chronic 2000
"It's Goin' Down"	1999	Mac Shawn, Tha Realest	Suge Knight Represents: Chronic 2000
"Nitro Runnin'"	1999	Baldhead Rick, Cougnut	Million Dollar Dream: Money & Muscle
"You Might Get G'eed"	1999	Too Short, Soopafly, Jazze Pha, E-40	Can't Stay Away
"Huh What"	1999	South Central Cartel	Concrete Jungle, Vol. 1
"A Husla'"	1999	Young Bleed, Lay Lo	My Own
"Who'z Knoccin' at My Door?"	2000	None	Held Up soundtrack
"Daz Intro"	2000	None	A Tribute to 2Pac: 2 Live and Die
"Crippin'"	2000	C-Bo	Enemy of the State
"D.P.G. Records"	2000	DS455	Bayside Ridaz
"Balled Out"	2001	San Quinn, JT the Bigga Figga	4.5.7 Is the Code
"Seasoned Vetrenz"	2001	Luni Coleone, King Philly, Laroo	In the Mouth of Madness
"Addicted"	2001	Skee 64	Half Man, Half Amazing
"Gangbangers"	2001	Coolio, Spade	Coolio.com
"Dangerous"	2001	Mac Dre, Bad Azz	Mac Dre's the Name
"Don't Wanna Die"	2001	Bad Azz, Blaqthoven	Personal Business
"Can I Git Bucc"	2001	Soopafly, Crooked I	Dat Whoopty Woop
"There Will Never Be Anotha"	2001	Soopafly, Richie Rich, Gonzoe	Dat Whoopty Woop
"Bacc 2 L.A."	2001	Soopafly, Xzibit	Dat Whoopty Woop
"Real Niggas"	2001	Young Ridah	What's Next?
"Eastside"	2001	Snoop Dogg, Big Tray Deee	Death Row's Snoop Doggy Dogg Greatest Hits
"Too High (Poly High)"	2001	Snoop Dogg, Twinz	Death Row's Snoop Doggy Dogg Greatest Hits
"Ghetto Ballin'"	2001	Speedy Loc, JT the Bigga Figga, Konvict, Low	Cali Thuggin'
"Watch Your Back"	2001	Sherm, RBX	Sherm Smoke
"Don't Give a Fuck"	2001	5th Ward Boyz	Recognize the Mob
"Ride with You"	2002	E.S.G. & Slim Thug	Boss Hogg Outlaws
"My Hood, Yo Hood"	2002	South Central Cartel	We Have the Right to Remain Violent!!!
"Raised on tha Side"	2002	Snoop Dogg, Kokane, Soopafly, E-White, Latoya Williams	Doggy Style Allstars, Vol. 1
"Get Your Party Down"	2002	Bigg Blue	Dippin' Tonite
"Go to War"	2003	Z-Ro, Papa Reu, Thug Dirt	Z-Ro Tolerance
"Party"	2003	Z-Ro, Cl'Che'	Z-Ro Tolerance
"I'm a Gangsta"	2003	Z-Ro, Tony Montana, Law Fleze	Z-Ro Tolerance
"Ju's a Hoe"	2003	Z-Ro	Z-Ro Tolerance
"Time and Time Again"	2003	Z-Ro, Thug Dirt	Z-Ro Tolerance
"Give It Up"	2003	Papa Reu, Thug Dirt	Certified
"Pop My Whip"	2003	H-Hustla, Celly Cel	The New Dope on the Street
"Gangsta Summer"	2003	Down, Fingazz	California Cowboys
"My Eyes"	2003	Killa Tay, Spice 1	21 Gun Salute
"What Would U Do"	2003	Pizzo, Lil' C-Style	The Tribulation...
"Tipsy (Remix)"	2004	J-Kwon, The Kid Slim, Da Brat, Bone Crusher, J-Bo	DPG Till the Day I Die: the So So Def Mixtape, Vol. I
"Knuck If You Buck (Remix)"	2004	Crime Mob, Lil' Scrappy	None
"Oh No"	2004	Young Buck	None
"DPG Unit"	2004	Young Buck, Soopafly, Snoop Dogg, 50 Cent, Lloyd Banks	Straight Outta Cashville
"Heavy on the Grind"	2004	H-Wood, Juanita Wynn	The Major Leagues
"My Nine Mil"	2004	MC Eiht	Smoke in tha City
"We Ride"	2004	Federation	The Album
"My Life"	2004	T.I.	Urban Legend
"10 Toes"	2005	Jermaine Dupri, The Kid Slim, J-Kwon, Stat Quo	Young, Fly & Flashy, Vol. 1
"Put Yo Hands Up"	2005	Young Lyfe, Lil' ½ Dead	Real Lyfe
"Diamond Rings"	2005	Youngbloodz	Ev'rybody Know Me
"How to Survive in the LBC"	2006	None	CT Experience
"On Bail"	2006	Xzibit, T-Pain, The Game	Full Circle
"Get Ya Paper"	2007	Soopafly	Bangin' Westcoast
"Number 1"	2007	Soopafly, Nate Dogg, Snoop Dogg	Bangin' Westcoast
"Gangsta Party Part 2"	2007	Young Noble & Hussein Fatal	Thug In Thug Out
"19 Dummy"	2008	Keak da Sneak	Deified
"Cold Hard World"	2009	MJG, T-Mack	All I Do
"Take U Home"	2011	Snoop Dogg, Kokane, Too Short	Doggumentary
"Rap Money"	2011	Freddie Gibbs & Statik Selektah	Lord Giveth, Lord Taketh Away
"Ahead of Ours"	2011	Soopafly	Best Kept Secret
"Step Ya Weed Game Up"	2012	Yukmouth, Jayo Felony	Half Baked
"And If I"	2012	Xecutive Disorder, Sly Boogy	Unleashed
"F.A.M.E."	2013	Freddie Gibbs, Spice 1	ESGN
"Transportin'"	2013	Celly Cel, Bad Lucc	Morphine X
"Please Listen Carefully"	2013	Cory Mo, Devin the Dude, Chamillionaire	Take It or Leave It
"501 Bluez"	2014	Kokane	Shut da F Up & Cut da Checc!
"Shouts Out"	2014	Cap 1, 8Ball	Clock Werk
"Curtains in the Back"	2014	MJG, Rahiem	Too Pimpin' 2.0
"Hustlin' 9 to 5"	2014	Pastor Troy, Snoop Dogg	Welcome to the Rap Game
"Dollar Signs"	2014	Gangsta Boo & Beat King	Underground Cassette Tape Music
"Why I Hustle"	2014	Paul Wall, Z-Ro	The Po-Up Poet
"Break Down"	2015	Gucci Mane, Sy Ari da Kid	Trapology
"My West"	2015	Bosko, Spice 1, MC Eiht	Putter Det Ned 4ever
"Hood"	2016	8Ball, Yo Gotti	None
"Money"	2016	Jooba loc, Snoop Dogg	Only Way Out
"Get Down"	2016	Mr. Capone-E, Dozay	For Respect
"Forever"	2017	Outlawz, G Perico	#LastOnezLeft
"Chizzle"	2018	Sly Pyper	Bible of Love
"Chosen"	2018	Lil' Keke, Bam Rogers, Herschelwood Hardheadz	Slfmade II
"The Struggle Iz Real"	2019	Devin Morrison	Bussin'
"JoDaz"	2020	Khujo	Echoes of a Legend
"Rock Ya Body"	2026	Rakim, Kurupt, Masta Killa, Ghostface Killah, Raekwon	The Godbody LP
