= Gangsta Advisory Records =

Independent record label

- Parent company: EOne Music, Universal
- Founded: 2000
- Founder: Daz Dillinger
- Distributors: D.P.G. Recordz; Doggystyle Records; Red Distribution eOne Music; Fontana Distribution
- Genre: Hip hop
- Country of origin: U.S.

Gangsta Advisory Records is the independent record label headed by Daz Dillinger. Some sources state the hierarchy of Daz's labels were flipped 2003 by ordering D.P.G. Recordz under G.A.R. to become its subsidiary and endorsing all license rights of D.P.G.

== Discography ==
- Daz Dillinger - R.A.W
- Daz Dillinger - This Is The Life I Lead
- Daz Dillinger - To Live and Die in CA
- Daz Dillinger - I Got Love in These Streetz - The Album
- Daz Dillinger - DPGC: U Know What I'm Throwin' Up
- Daz Dillinger - Tha Dogg Pound Gangsta LP
- Daz Dillinger - Gangsta Crunk
- Daz Dillinger - Gangsta Party
- Daz Dillinger - Only on the Left Side
- Daz Dillinger - Public Enemiez
- Daz Dillinger - Matter of Dayz
- Daz Dillinger - D.A.Z.
- Daz Dillinger - Witit Witit
- Daz Dillinger - Weed Money
- Kurupt - Same Day, Different Shit
- Soopafly - Dat Whoopty Woop
- Soopafly - Bangin Westcoast
- Soopafly - Best Kept Secret
- Daz Dillinger & JT The Bigga Figga - From Long Beach 2 Fillmoe
- Daz Dillinger & JT The Bigga Figga - Game for Sale
- Who Ride Wit Us: Tha Compalation, Vol. 1
- Who Ride Wit Us: Tha Compalation, Vol. 2
- Who Ride Wit Us: Tha Compalation, Vol. 3
- Who Ride Wit Us: Tha Compalation, Vol. 4
- Who Ride Wit Us: Tha Compalation, Vol. 5
- Who Ride Wit Us: Tha Compalation, Vol. 6
- Tha Dogg Pound - Dillinger & Young Gotti
- Tha Dogg Pound - The Last of Tha Pound
- Tha Dogg Pound - Dillinger & Young Gotti II: Tha Saga Continuez...
- Tha Dogg Pound - Dogg Chit
- Tha Dogg Pound - Let's Ryde 2Night EP
- Tha Dogg Pound - That Was Then, This Is Now
- Tha Dogg Pound - Keep on Ridin
- Tha Dogg Pound - 100 Wayz
- RBX - Ripp Tha Game Bloody: Street Muzic
- Lil' C-Style - Blacc Balled
- Daz & WC - West Coast Gangsta Sh*t

== Management ==
- CEO : Daz Dillinger
- VP of Marketing and Promotions : Arnold "Bigg A" White

== Official Djs ==
- DJ Strong (Cali Untouchables)
- DJ Warrior (Cali Untouchables)

== Artists ==
- Daz Dillinger
- Mac Shawn
- Tha Dogg Pound (Daz & Kurupt)
- Crooked I
- The Realest
- Tha Gang (Daz, Soopafly, Tray Deee, Bad Azz)
- Lil' C-Style
- Bad Azz
- Lil' Eazy-E

== Sister labels ==
- D.P.G. Recordz
- Penagon Recordz
- Fly2k Recordz
- Double Dollar Sign Recordz
- Antra Records
- Doggystyle Records

== See also ==
- List of record labels
