= Soopafly discography =

This is discography of American rapper, Soopafly.

== Albums ==
=== Studio albums ===
Year	Title
2001	Dat Whoopty Woop: Released: July 31, 2001; Label: DPG (1002); Format: CD, LP
2007	Bangin West Coast: Released: May 8, 2007; Label: Gangsta Advisory (80162); Format: CD
2011	Best Kept Secret: Released: August 30, 2011; Label: Fly2k; Format: CD,Digital

== Singles ==
=== As lead artist ===
Year	Title	Peak chart positions	Album
Year	Title	US R&B	Album
1999	"Like It or Not"	111	Dat Whoopty Woop

=== As featured performer ===
Year	Title	Peak chart positions	Album
Year	Title	US R&B	Album
1998	"Put the Monkey in It" (Daz Dillinger featuring Soopafly)	101	Nothing to Lose soundtrack

== Guest appearances ==
Year	Title	Artist(s)	Album
1996	"You Thought"	Snoop Dogg, Too Short	Tha Doggfather
1996	"Underestimated"	Dru Down feat. Soopafly	Can You Feel Me
1997	"Only in California"	Mack 10, Ice Cube, Snoop Dogg	Based on a True Story
1997	"Out The Moon (Boom, Boom, Boom)"	Snoop Doggy Dogg feat. 2Pac, Tray Dee, Soopafly, Bad Azz & Techniec	Gridlock'd soundtrack
1998	"Thank God For My Life"	Daz Dillinger feat. Tha Gang, Tray Dee, Soopafly, Bad Azz & Big Pimpin	Retaliation, Revenge and Get Back
1998	"Gang Bangin Ass Criminal"	Daz Dillinger feat. Kurupt, Techniec, Tray Dee, Soopafly, Bad Azz	Retaliation, Revenge and Get Back
1998	"Don't Let The Money Make You"	Xzibit feat. Soopafly & King T	40 Dayz & 40 Nightz
1999	"Mamacita"	Don Cisco, Frost, Kurupt	Next Friday soundtrack and Oh Boy
1999	"Like It Or Not"	Soopafly	Suge Knight Represents: Chronic 2000
1999	"OG to BG"	Soopafly, Daz Dillinger & Kurupt from Tha Dogg Pound	Suge Knight Represents: Chronic 2000
1999	"Hell Ya"	Tray Dee, Daz Dillinger, Kurupt	Whiteboys soundtrack
1999	"Represent Dat G.C."	Kurupt feat. Daz Dillinger, Snoop Dogg, Soopafly, Tray Dee, Jayo Felony & Butch Cassidy	Tha Streetz Iz A Mutha
1999	"I Ain't Shit Without My Homeboyz"	Kurupt feat. Daz Dillinger, Soopafly, Baby S & Crooked I	Tha Streetz Iz A Mutha
1999	"It Ain't About You"	Kurupt feat. Soopafly, Tray Dee & LaToiya Williams	Tha Streetz Iz A Mutha
1999	"Neva Gonna Give It Up"	Kurupt feat. Warren G, Snoop Dogg, Nate Dogg, Tray Dee & Soopafly	Tha Streetz Iz A Mutha
1999	"They May Fuck Wit U"	Soopafly	Escape From Death Row
1999	"Hittin Fo'"	Soopafly & Hit From Tha LBC	Escape From Death Row
1999	"You Might Get G'eed"	Too Short feat. Daz, E-40 & Soopafly	Can't Stay Away
2000	"Your Gyrlfriend 2"	Daz Dillinger feat. Mac Shawn & Soopafly	R.A.W.
2000	"Put Your Hands Up"	Doggys Angels feat. Snoop Dogg, Soopafly, Kokane, King Lou & Ruff Dogg	Pleezbaleevit!
2001	"Your Gyrlfriend 2"	Tha Dogg Pound, Mac Shawn	2002
2001	"Way Too Often"	Tha Dogg Pound	2002
2001	"Eastside Ridaz"	Tha Eastsidaz, Nate Dogg	Duces 'n Trayz: The Old Fashioned Way
2001	"I Pledge Allegiance"	Tha Eastsidaz, Kokane	Duces 'n Trayz: The Old Fashioned Way
2001	"Dogghouse In Your Mouth"	Tha Eastsidaz, Suga Free, RBX, Kurupt, Ruff Dogg, King Lou, Mixmaster Spade	Duces 'n Trayz: The Old Fashioned Way
2001	"Hate on Me"	Kurupt feat. Soopafly & Damani	Space Boogie: Smoke Oddessey
2001	"Jimmy's Revenge"	Snoop Dogg & Soopafly	Bones soundtrack
2001	"Huh-What!"	Soopafly	Two-Way Hustle Ghetto Grammer soundtrack
2001	"Gotta Get Dis Money"	Soopafly	The Wash soundtrack
2001	"Somethin' To Bounce To"	Warren G feat. Soopafly	The Return of the Regulator
2002	"This Spot"	Bad Azz	We from the LBC
2002	"Don't Fight The Feelin'"	Nate Dogg, Cam'ron, Snoop Dogg, Lady May & Soopafly	Doggy Style Allstars Vol. 1
2002	"Are You Ready!?"	Soopafly	Doggy Style Allstars Vol. 1
2002	"Bitch's Treat"	Soopafly & LaToiya Williams	Doggy Style Allstars Vol. 1
2002	"Hey You"	Soopafly, E-White & Snoop Dogg	Doggy Style Allstars Vol. 1
2002	"Dogg House America"	Soopafly, E-White, Mr. Kane, Snoop Dogg & LaToiya Williams	Doggy Style Allstars Vol. 1
2002	"Doh' Doh'"	Soopafly, E-White, Snoop Dogg & Mr. Kane	Doggy Style Allstars Vol. 1
2002	"Raised On Tha Side"	Soopafly, E-White, Snoop Dogg, Mr. Kane & Daz	Doggy Style Allstars Vol. 1
2002	"Not Like It Was"	Soopafly, Snoop Dogg, E-White & RBX	Doggy Style Allstars Vol. 1
2002	"Light That Shit Up (Endo)"	Soopafly, Snoop Dogg, RBX & Mr. Kane	Doggy Style Allstars Vol. 1
2002	"I Don't Hang (G Mix)"	Soopafly	Tha Dogg Pound DPGC The Remix LP
2004	"Lonely Girl"	213	The Hard Way
2004	"Can U Control Yo' Hoe?"	Snoop Dogg	R&G (Rhythm & Gangsta): The Masterpiece
2006	"DPG Fo' Life"	Daz feat. Snoop Dogg & Soopafly	So So Gangsta
2006	"Which One Of You"	Snoop Dogg feat. Nine Inch Dix, Soopafly & Lil Half Dead	Tha Blue Carpet Treatment
2006	"Like This"	Snoop Dogg feat. Westurn Union (Damani, Soopafly, Bad Lucc), LaToiya Williams & Raul Midon	Tha Blue Carpet Treatment
2006	"Bangin West Coast"	Soopafly	DJ Skee & DJ Reflex Present DJ Crazy Toones CT Experience
2006	"Gangbang Music"	Soopafly & Kurupt	DJ Skee & DJ Reflex Present DJ Crazy Toones CT Experience
2007	"Fuckin' Is Good For U"	Damani, JT The Bigga Figga, Kurupt, Soopafly & Snoop Dogg	Snoop Dogg Presents The Big Squeeze
2007	"Spend Some Time"	Ricky Harris, Uncle Chucc, Kurupt, Soopafly & Snoop Dogg	Snoop Dogg Presents The Big Squeeze
2007	"We Came To Bang Out"	Tha Dogg Pound, Soopafly & Snoop Dogg	Snoop Dogg Presents The Big Squeeze
2010	"Anotha Clip"	Tha Dogg Pound feat. Soopafly & RBX	100 Wayz
2010	"Otha'side Of Town"	Tha Dogg Pound feat. Soopafly & Tokedasmoke	100 Wayz
2010	"Cheat'n Ass Lover"	Tha Dogg Pound feat. Soopafly, Nate Dogg & Dru Down	100 Wayz
2011	"Don't U Eva 4 Get"	Daz Dillinger feat. WC & Soopafly	D.A.Z.
2011	"Stickin To The Script"	WC feat. Daz, Kurupt, Bad Lucc & Soopafly	Revenge Of The Barracuda
2012	"And She Don't Even Know"	Crooked I, Kobe	Psalm 82: V6
