= Dillinger & Young Gotti =

Studio album by DPG
- Released: May 8, 2001
- Recorded: October 2000 – February 2001
- Genres: West Coast hip hop; gangsta rap
- Length: 73:04
- Label: D.P.G. Recordz
- Producers: Daz Dillinger (also exec.); Blaqthoven; Mike Dean

Tha Dogg Pound chronology
Dogg Food (1995)	Dillinger & Young Gotti (2001)	2002 (2001)

Professional ratings
Review scores
Source	Rating
AllMusic	2.5/5 stars
RapReviews	7/10
Los Angeles Times	3/4 stars
The Source	3.5/5 stars

Dillinger & Young Gotti is the second studio album by American hip hop group Tha Dogg Pound. It was released independently on May 8, 2001, through D.P.G. Recordz. Production was handled by member Daz Dillinger, who also served as executive producer, Mike Dean and Blaqthoven. It features guest appearances from Beanie Sigel, RBX, Roscoe, Slip Capone and Xzibit.

The album peaked at number 124 on the Billboard 200, number 26 on the Top R&B/Hip-Hop Albums, and number two on both the Heatseekers Albums and the Independent Albums charts in the United States.

Two singles were released to promote the album—"Dillinger & Young Gotti", which composed of four songs: "Dipp With Me", "Gangsta Like" (without Xzibit's verse), "Party At My House" and "You Justa Bitch", and "Coastin" with accompanying music video.

== Background ==
Both Tha Dogg Pound members, Daz Dillinger and Kurupt, have been signed with Death Row Records since the label's inception in 1992. In 1995, they released their debut studio album Dogg Food, which became a success. Kurupt left Death Row in 1997 and opened his Antra Records imprint in 1998. He went on releasing two solo albums, Kuruption! in 1998 and Tha Streetz Iz a Mutha in 1999, where Daz appeared as one of guest rappers and producers on both projects.

Daz released his first solo studio album, Retaliation, Revenge and Get Back, in 1998 on Death Row. In late 1999 he parted ways with the label and started release music via his own independent record label D.P.G. Recordz. Year 2000 saw the release of his second solo studio album R.A.W. through his own label, where Kurupt also took part. In early 2001, Daz released two albums, Long Beach 2 Fillmoe and Game for Sale, in collaboration with JT the Bigga Figga, a fellow rapper and record producer from San Francisco. In the latter, Kurupt recorded a verse to one of the songs.

Due to Death Row Records owned the rights to the 'Tha Dogg Pound' name, Kurupt and Daz released Dillinger & Young Gotti under the name 'DPG' (which stands for the 'Dogg Pound Gangstaz'). A few months after the release of their second studio album and Kurupt's third solo album Space Boogie: Smoke Oddessey, Death Row released Death Row Presents... Tha Dogg Pound 2002, a collection of previously unreleased material recorded and produced by the duo while they were signed to the label, under 'Tha Dogg Pound' moniker, touting it as the group's sophomore studio album.

== Aftermath ==
In early 2002, Kurupt re-signed with Death Row Records (rebranded as Tha Row Records) as a solo artist in exchange for the position of Vice President of the label, which sparked a feud between himself and the rest of the DPGC, including Daz and Snoop Dogg, and led to the disintegration of Tha Dogg Pound. The duo verbally attacked each other off the reel recording subsequently multiple diss tracks from 2002 to 2004. Daz took aim at Kurupt, Death Row, Ja Rule and Benzino on his 2003 fourth solo studio album DPGC: U Know What I'm Throwin' Up, while Kurupt heavily responded on his 2004 Originals project.

Kurupt's fourth solo album Against the Grain was being prepared for release in 2004 for Tha Row. After multiple delays, the album was finally dropped in 2005, when Kurupt had already left the label due to label CEO Suge Knight's incarceration.

Daz had six solo projects released, including a collaborative album with Houston rapper Nuwine between his solo albums. In April 2005, at a The Western Conference meeting hosted by Snoop Dogg, the two ended their feud, and on November 1 of that year, a sequel and third studio album, Dillinger & Young Gotti II: Tha Saga Continuez... was released.

== Track listing ==
No.	Title	Writer(s)	Producer(s)	Length
1.	"Intro" (Dillinger and Young Gotti)	Delmar Arnaud; Ricardo Brown; Michael Dean	Mike Dean	1:18
2.	"Dipp Wit Me" (featuring RBX)	Arnaud; Brown	Daz Dillinger	4:36
3.	"We Livin' Gangsta Like" (featuring Xzibit)	Arnaud; Brown	Daz Dillinger; Mike Dean	4:20
4.	"Coastin'"	Arnaud; Brown; Dean	Daz Dillinger; Mike Dean	3:37
5.	"We About to Get Fucc'd Up"	Arnaud; Brown	Daz Dillinger; Mike Dean	3:25
6.	"Gitta Strippin'"	Arnaud; Brown	Daz Dillinger	3:32
7.	"Work Dat Pussy"	Arnaud; Brown; Dean	Daz Dillinger; Mike Dean	1:21
8.	"Party at My House"	Arnaud; Brown; Dean	Daz Dillinger; Mike Dean	3:47
9.	"You're Just a B.I.T.C.H."	Arnaud; Brown; Anthony Ransom	Daz Dillinger; Blaqthoven	3:40
10.	"Treat Her Like a Lady"	Arnaud; Brown	Daz Dillinger; Mike Dean	4:07
11.	"At Night"	Arnaud; Brown; Dean	Daz Dillinger; Mike Dean	4:14
12.	"Best Run" (featuring Beanie Sigel and Roscoe)	Arnaud; Brown; Dwight Grant; David Williams; Dean	Daz Dillinger; Mike Dean	4:26
13.	"Shit Happenz"	Arnaud; Brown; Dean	Daz Dillinger; Mike Dean	3:23
14.	"My Heart Don't Pump No Fear" (featuring Slip Capone)	Arnaud; Brown; Christen Kelley; Ransom	Daz Dillinger; Blaqthoven	4:11
15.	"There's Someway Out"	Arnaud; Brown; Dean	Daz Dillinger; Mike Dean	2:49
16.	"Here We Are/Go Killem" (Dillinger Solo)	Arnaud; Dean	Daz Dillinger; Mike Dean	4:47
17.	"I'm a Gangsta" (Young Gotti Solo)	Arnaud; Brown; Dean	Daz Dillinger; Mike Dean	4:39
18.	"How Many?"	Arnaud; Brown; Dean	Daz Dillinger; Mike Dean	3:56
19.	"C-Walkin' Cha Cha Cha"	Arnaud; Brown	Daz Dillinger	1:56
20.	"D.P.G."	Arnaud; Brown; Dean	Daz Dillinger; Mike Dean	4:00
21.	"Dillinger and Young Gotti" (Outro)	Arnaud; Brown; Dean	Mike Dean	1:00
Total length:				73:04

== Personnel ==
- Delmar "Daz Dillinger" Arnaud – vocals (tracks: 1–16, 18–21), producer (tracks: 2–20), executive producer
- Ricardo "Kurupt" Brown – vocals (tracks: 1–15, 17–21)
- Eric "RBX" Collins – vocals (track 2)
- Alvin "Xzibit" Joiner – vocals (track 3)
- Dwight "Beanie Sigel" Grant – vocals (track 12)
- David "Roscoe" Williams – vocals (track 12)
- Christen "Slip Capone" Kelley – vocals (track 14)
- Tanya Herron – backing vocals
- Mike Dean – producer (tracks: 1, 3–5, 7, 8, 10–13, 15–18, 20, 21), mixing (tracks: 1–3, 21), mastering
- Anthony "Blaqthoven" Ransom – producer (tracks: 9, 14)
- Garland "Ghetto" Scyrus – production coordinator
- Adam A. Amaya – art direction
- Jorge Munguia – art direction
- Shawn Brauch – art direction
- Pen & Pixel Graphics, Inc. – artwork, design, layout
- Kevin Wales – management

== Charts ==
Chart (2001)	Peak position
US Billboard 200	124
US Top R&B/Hip-Hop Albums (Billboard)	26
US Independent Albums (Billboard)	2
US Heatseekers Albums (Billboard)	2
