= Dillinger & Young Gotti II: Tha Saga Continuez... =

Studio album by D.P.G.
- Released: November 1, 2005
- Recorded: 2005
- Genre: West Coast hip-hop; gangsta rap
- Length: 51:27
- Label: Gangsta Advisory
- Producer: Daz Dillinger; DJ Xtra Large; Ivan Johnson; L.T. Hutton; Soopafly

Tha Dogg Pound chronology
The Last of Tha Pound (2004)	Dillinger & Young Gotti II: Tha Saga Continuez... (2005)	Cali Iz Active (2006)

Daz Dillinger chronology
Gangsta Crunk (2005)	Dillinger & Young Gotti II: Tha Saga Continuez... (2005)	So So Gangsta (2006)

Kurupt chronology
Against tha Grain (2005)	Dillinger & Young Gotti II: Tha Saga Continuez... (2005)	Same Day, Different Shit (2006)

Professional ratings
Review scores
Source	Rating
RapReviews	6.5/10

Dillinger & Young Gotti II: Tha Saga Continuez... is the third studio album by American gangsta rap group Tha Dogg Pound. It was released on November 1, 2005, via Gangsta Advisory Records. Production was handled by member Daz Dillinger, who also served as executive producer, Ivan Johnson, DJ Xtra Large, L.T. Hutton and Soopafly. It features guest appearances from Men-Nefer and D-Sharp.

In the United States, the album debuted at number 66 on the Top R&B/Hip-Hop Albums, number 23 on the Independent Albums and number 16 on the Heatseekers Albums charts. As of April 2006, according to SoundScan, it has sold over 113,000 copies in the US.

== Background ==
The album serves as a sequel to the duo's 2001 release for D.P.G. Recordz, Dillinger & Young Gotti, marking their second studio album under the 'D.P.G.' name (instead of the original 'Tha Dogg Pound', which owns by their former label, Death Row Records). It also marks a reunion between Daz Dillinger and Kurupt after both members were feuding since the latter re-joined the hostile Death Row label in early 2002. By mid-2005, Snoop Dogg hinted at a reunion of the entire DPGC collective, namedropping Kurupt and Daz among other members. Daz told HipHopDX that the first song they wrote together after the breakup was "Push Bacc".

Following his second departure from Death Row, Kurupt (whose legal name is Ricardo Brown) is credited as D. Williams in the album credits. It is believed due to contractual reasons he had to use his younger brother Roscoe's (whose real name is David Williams) publishing.

== Track listing ==
No.	Title	Writer(s)	Producer(s)	Length
1.	"Tha Saga Continuez..."		Daz Dillinger	0:58
2.	"DPGC Muzic"	Delmar Arnaud; Ricardo Brown; Ivan Johnson	Daz Dillinger; Ivan Johnson	4:22
3.	"Blast 'Em Up" (Skit)		Daz Dillinger	0:23
4.	"Cuz I'm a Gangsta"	Arnaud; Brown; K. Turner	DJ Xtra Large	4:53
5.	"Hittin' Donutz in tha Streetz"	Arnaud; Brown; Johnson	Daz Dillinger; Ivan Johnson	4:18
6.	"Say It"	Arnaud; Brown; Johnson	Daz Dillinger; Ivan Johnson	3:58
7.	"We Gitt"	Arnaud; Brown; Johnson	Daz Dillinger; Ivan Johnson	4:47
8.	"U Remind Me..." (featuring Men-Nefer)	Arnaud; Brown; Priest Brooks	Daz Dillinger; Soopafly; Ivan Johnson^{[a]}	4:11
9.	"Make Me a Believer"	Arnaud; Brown; Johnson	Daz Dillinger; Ivan Johnson	4:01
10.	"I Luv When U" (featuring Men-Nefer)	Arnaud; Brown; T. Jones; T. Dyson-Jerry; Johnson	Daz Dillinger; Ivan Johnson	4:36
11.	"What U Gone Do?"	Arnaud; Brown; Johnson	Daz Dillinger; Ivan Johnson	4:12
12.	"Push Bacc"	Arnaud; Brown; Lenton Terrell Hutton	L.T. Hutton	4:21
13.	"Ride & Creep" (featuring D-Sharp)	Arnaud; Brown; D. Turner; K. Turner	DJ Xtra Large	2:46
14.	"Outro" (Feels Good to Be a Dogg Pound Gangsta)	Arnaud; Brown; Johnson	Daz Dillinger; Ivan Johnson	3:41
Total length:				51:27

Notes

- ^{^[a]} signifies a co-producer.

== Personnel ==
- Delmar "Daz Dillinger" Arnaud – vocals, producer (tracks: 1–3, 5–11, 14), executive producer
- Ricardo "Kurupt" Brown – vocals
- Crystal Varnado – backing vocals (track 6)
- Men-Nefer – vocals (tracks: 8, 10)
- D. "D-Sharp" Turner – vocals (track 13)
- Stuart "Shorty B" Jordan – guitar (tracks: 6, 8), bass (track 6)
- Elijah Baker – bass (tracks: 8, 10)
- Ivan Johnson – producer (tracks: 2, 5–7, 9–11, 14), co-producer (track 8)
- K. "DJ Xtra Large" Turner – producer (tracks: 4, 13)
- Priest "Soopafly" Brooks – producer (track 8)
- Lenton "L.T." Hutton – producer (track 12)
- Alex "Toon" Deligiannis – artwork, design
- Ken Francis – photography

== Charts ==
Chart (2005)	Peak position
US Top R&B/Hip-Hop Albums (Billboard)	66
US Independent Albums (Billboard)	23
US Heatseekers Albums (Billboard)	16
