= Slip Capone =

American rapper

- Born: Christen Kelley; November 7, 1978
- Origin: Hawthorne, California, U.S.
- Died: October 2, 2017 (aged 38)
- Genres: West Coast hip hop
- Occupation: Rapper
- Years active: 1994–2017
- Labels: DPG Recordz; Death Row Records
- Website: https://soundcloud.com/slip-capone

Christen Kelley (November 7, 1978 – October 2, 2017), better known by his stage name Slip Capone, was an American rapper and member of DPGC from Hawthorne, California, California.

== Early life ==
Slip Capone was born on November 7, 1978. He grew up on 118th street in Hawthorne California. He is half British and half African American and is commonly referred to as “The Mayor of Hawthorne". Christen Kelley was signed to Death Row Records in the mid 90's when he was 14 years old. He then went on to appear on Kurupt’s solo debut album Kuruption! on a song called "Survive Another Day" by Kurupt featuring Gonzo and himself.

=== Early career ===
During his teenage years, Slip Capone met rapper Snoop Dogg through Kurupt of the Dogg Pound. Proving himself with his rapping skills, his first appearance was on Snoop Dogg’s multiplatinum Murder Was the Case soundtrack with a song called "The Eulogy" by Slip Capone & CPO Boss Hogg.

== Death ==
Kelley died on October 2, 2017, of serious health complications after laying in a coma on life support.

== Discography ==
Studio albums

- Caponey Boy (2009)
- Kill The Industry (2010)

Posthumous albums

- Supagangsta (with Dae One) (2018)
- The Mayor Of Hawthorne (2021)

Compilations

- Greatest Features (2009)

=== Guest appearances ===
1994

- Slip Capone & CPO - The Eulogy ("Murder was the Case") Soundtrack

1998

- Kurupt, Tray Deee, Daz Dillinger, Slip Capone - C-Walk

1998

- Kurupt feat. Slip Capone - Another Day

2000

- Slip Capone - Movin around' prod Daz Dillinger

2001

- DPG feat. Slip Capone - My Heart Don't Pump No Fear

2002

- Knoc-turn’al feat. Butch Cassidy, Jayo Felony, Slip Capone & Time Bomb - Let's All Roll

2002

- Knoc-turn’al feat. Too $hort & Slip Capone - Cash Sniffin’ Noses'

2010

- Slip Capone - U can't fuck with prod Ill Slim Collin

2014

- Slip Capone feat. Nate Dogg - Mind On My Money

2016

- Philly Swain feat.Schoolboy Q & Slip Capone - Gangsta Cinema

2021

- Slip Capone - U still can't fuck with prod Ill Slim Collin
