= The Last of Tha Pound =

Compilation album by Tha Dogg Pound
- Released: April 27, 2004
- Recorded: 1995–2001
- Genre: West Coast hip hop, gangsta rap
- Length: 42:22
- Label: Gangsta Advisory
- Producer: Daz Dillinger

Tha Dogg Pound chronology
2002 (2001)	The Last of Tha Pound (2004)	Dillinger & Young Gotti II: Tha Saga Continuez... (2005)

Professional ratings
Review scores
Source	Rating
RapReviews.com	7.5/10 link

The Last of Tha Pound is the second compilation album by the rap group Tha Dogg Pound. It was released on April 27, 2004, by Gangsta Advisory Records.

== Track listing ==
1. "Don't Stop, Keep Goin" (original unreleased version) (featuring Nas) 5:04
2. "It Ain't My Fault (Pussy-Eater Cum-Hand Marion)" (featuring Bad Azz) 3:45
3. "What Tha People Say" 5:46
4. "School Yard (D.P.G.C. High)" 3:14
5. "Got to Get It Get It" (featuring Foxy Brown) 3:39
6. "Some Likk Coochie & Some Likk Di*K" 3:24
7. "Stories of Hoez We Know" 3:51
8. "Jakkmove" (featuring Outlawz) 5:20
9. "We R Them Dogg Pound Gangstaz" 2:45
10. "Started" 5:32
