= Don't Go 2 Sleep =

EP by Makaveli and Daz Dillinger
- Released: December 24, 2001
- Recorded: 1995–1996
- Genre: West Coast hip hop; gangsta rap
- Length: 48:33
- Label: D.P.G. Recordz; Makaveli Records
- Producer: Daz Dillinger; Mike Dean; Fredwreck; Johnny J

Makaveli chronology
Until the End of Time (2001)	Don't Go 2 Sleep (2001)	Better Dayz (2002)

Daz Dillinger chronology
R.A.W. (2000)	Don't Go 2 Sleep (2001)	This Is the Life I Lead (2002)

Professional ratings
Review scores
Source	Rating
Worldwide Westside Magazine	3.5/5 stars
Music Box	4.5/5 stars
Xtam4	4/5 stars

Don't Go 2 Sleep is a compilation EP by American rappers Makaveli and Daz Dillinger. It has eight tracks. There are two other (bootleg) versions of the EP, but the original has only eight tracks. It was released December 24, 2001, on D.P.G. Recordz. The tracks were recorded at Death Row Records between 1995–96 for Tupac's and Boot Camp Clik's project "One Nation". Later when Daz left Death Row, he stole an unknown amount of Tupac's unreleased masters, some of which can be heard on this EP. The only track left untouched by Daz is "They Don't Give a Fuck About Us", all other tracks were remixed and Daz also added himself onto tracks he originally didn't appear on, despite Dillinger marketing the EP as an original collaboration album.

== Versions ==
Version 0: The album was announced as Dillinger & Makaveli. The original artwork was posted on hitemup.com and mentioned D.P.G. Record Presentz in green lettering. The original track listing posted on hitemup.com included eight tracks: Wake Up My People, First To Bomb, Let's Fight, Um Dumpin, Don't Go To Sleep, They Don't Give A Fuck About Us, 187 Um, Heaven or Hell Outro. This version never saw the light of day however, and track-listings were soon changed.

Version 1: The first leaked release was ripped into poor quality and cut differently so that the tracks all ran together much like they do on the Makaveli album. This was in fact the first release available, and was put out thanks in part to certain members of the Pacboard community. This release included the same six tracks as above, as well as the originals of First to Bomb and Don't Go To Sleep instead of 187 Um and Heaven or Hell Outro. The cover read "Tupac Shakur & Daz Dillinger" in green lettering. This release was also released on a label dubbed "Pacaveli Records" and shows up from time to time on eBay.

Version 1.5: This was the actual eight track release of the album by Daz Dillinger. It included the usual eight songs and was pressed and sold on the streets. The cover for the album had "D.P.G. Recordz Presents" in green lettering at the top of the album and had the track-listing on the back cover.

Version 2: This is the Japan import version. This release included the same eight tracks as before, but also included the tracks "Only Move 4 Tha Money", "Don't Go To Sleep Soul-G Remix", "First To Bomb" instrumental, as well as "First to Bomb BBK Remix". For this release the cover was altered as real photos were photoshopped into the background of the cover for the 100 dollar bills. The top of the cover was changed to say Tupac Shakur & Daz Dillinger in white lettering. This release was released by Makaveli Records, and is the most common and easy to find release.

Version 3: Finally, on September 13, 2003, Daz put out what he called "Makaveli & Dillinger, The Whole Album". This was basically the Japan import with some skits and filler tracks on it. The only new track that included 2Pac was the song "Initiated" which was released in 1998 on Daz's Retaliation, Revenge & Get Back album. The full track-listing for this album included 25 tracks, most of which was from Daz's then new album. Thus far, this was the last Makaveli & Dillinger release.

== Controversy ==
On August 27, 2001, mother of Tupac, Afeni Shakur filed a lawsuit against Delmar Arnaud better known as Daz Dillinger seeking unspecified damages caused by his unauthorized pre-release online order for this album on the official website of D.P.G. Recordz. As the only legal successor of the copyright of anything connected with the brand names "2Pac" and "Makaveli" and executor and estate administrator of Tupac's musical compositions, Afeni Shakur has the right only to grant permission to release the recordings or to use her son's name, that – according to her – she was never earlier asked to do so by any of the management of D.P.G. Recordz.

The lawsuit contains 13 causes of action, including:

- trademark infringement,
- unfair competition,
- trademark dilution,
- copyright infringement,
- trademark infringement under common law,
- conversion,
- unjust enrichment,
- declaratory relief,
- and accountings.

Shakur also maintains that Dillinger was still promoting the release of the album and accepting PayPal orders through his website all unauthorized.

Daz stopped the selling of the Makaveli & Dillinger EP and days after the September 11 attacks the main page of the whole site changed into a tribute design. Later deathrowrecords.com adopted the material claiming the rights of the license for "Tha Dogg Pound" and "Dat Nigga Daz" and all material recorded under these pseudonyms. It is still purchasable there with some slight modifications in the number of tracks and their order.

Daz claims in the April 2005 issue of XXL that he still owns several recordings of 2Pac never heard before. While living in Los Angeles he was insulted in several warranted house searches by Suge Knight and by the police that were attempts to confiscate the reels. The legal status of those copies, however, still remains unclear.
