= Public Enemiez =

Studio album by Daz Dillinger
- Released: August 11, 2009
- Genre: West Coast hip hop
- Label: D.P.G. Recordz/Gangsta Advisory Records
- Producer: Daz Dillinger

Daz Dillinger chronology
Only on the Left Side (2008)	Public Enemiez (2009)	Matter of Dayz (2010)

Singles from Public Enemiez
- 1. "In My Neighborhood" Released: April 16, 2009; 2. "Tell Me What You Got" Released: April 20, 2009; 3. "Meet Me @ Tha Strip Club" Released: June 3, 2009

Public Enemiez is the eleventh studio album by rapper Daz Dillinger. A release date for the album was planned for mid July 2009 to coincide with the release of the film Public Enemies, of which the album is named after. The album ended up being released on August 11, 2009.

== Conception ==
A recent video posted on Daz Dillinger's YouTube page promoting the album has Daz Dillinger stating that Public Enemiez is currently in production and will be his next solo album coming soon. Daz stated that the album will be 14 songs in length, with Daz producing the entire album including feature appearances from LaToiya Williams, Los & Nicole Wray.

== Content ==
A track listing was later posted on Daz Dillinger's website listing 16 songs instead of 14. When the album was released however, it was ultimately 12 tracks. Unlike many of his previous albums which focused on a strong gangsta theme and lyrics, Daz has covered a much wider range of lyrical content. Public Enemiez features Daz rapping about a diverse area of topics such as harsh living conditions for children in his neighborhood to his reminiscent Death Row days, as well as covering the status quo topics of women and materialism.

The first video single In My Neighborhood, was released on April 16, and features Daz rapping in his neighborhood with children speaking out about the problems and struggles that people and children are still facing in ghettos across the world.

The second video single Tell Me What You Got is a song aimed at Suge Knight, who went bankrupt and was forced to sell Death Row Records to new owners and is now no longer a force in the record industry. The song tells the Death Row story from Daz's perspective and how he made it through the transition from a crumbling major record label to a successful independent artist.

The latest single Meet Me @ Tha Strip Club holds true to the topic of materialism and features a brand new sound similar to Daz's Gangsta Crunk album with much more electronic elements. The video is a distorted playback of Daz throwing money at dancing women in a strip club.

== Track listing ==
1. You Let Me Down (featuring LaToiya Williams) 5:24
2. Tell Me What U Got 3:51
3. Life Stagez 4:54
4. Nuthin'z Gonna Stop Me (featuring Los) 4:13
5. 2nd to None 4:08
6. Tear Drops 4:20
7. In My Neighborhood (featuring Los) 4:00
8. Munchiez 4 Ya Love (featuring Nicole Wray) 3:52
9. My #1 Girl (featuring Los) 3:51
10. Tha Baddest Bitch (featuring Chris Starr) 5:10
11. Meet Me @ tha Strip Club 4:36
12. Public Enemiez 3:44
