= Cuzznz =

Studio album by Daz Dillinger and Snoop Dogg
- Released: January 15, 2016
- Recorded: 2011–2015
- Genres: West Coast hip-hop; G-funk
- Length: 55:17
- Label: Felder Entertainment Inc.
- Producers: Daz Dillinger (also exec.); Snoop Dogg (also exec.); Dâm-funk; kjconteh

Daz Dillinger chronology
Weed Money (2014)	Cuzznz (2016)	Dazamataz (2018)

Snoop Dogg chronology
LBC Movement presents Beach City (2015)	Cuzznz (2016)	Coolaid (2016)

Singles from Cuzznz
- 1. "Best Friend" Released: December 3, 2015

Professional ratings
Review scores
Source	Rating
Pitchfork	6.1/10

Cuzznz is the collaborative studio album by American West Coast rappers Daz Dillinger and Snoop Dogg. It was released on January 15, 2016, by Felder Entertainment Inc. Cuzznz has guest appearances from Dâm-funk, Kurupt and Shon'Lawon.

== Singles ==
On April 11, 2014 "We'll Miss U" was released. It was produced by dj2high.

The track "Sho You Right" was released on SoundCloud on October 26, 2015. The song was produced by Dâm-funk.

"Best Friend" was leaked via SoundCloud on December 3, 2015, and released along with the pre-order of the album on same day. It was officially released as the album's first single. The song was produced by kjconteh.

On January 14, 2016, "N My Life Tyme" was released. The song was produced by Dâm-funk.

== Track listing ==
Cuzznz — North American standard version
No.	Title	Producer(s)	Length
1.	"Have U Eva"	Dâm-funk	3:50
2.	"N My System" (featuring Dâm-funk)	Dâm-funk	5:19
3.	"Six n'da Morning" (featuring Kurupt)	Jansport J	3:09
4.	"Pop Pop Bang"	Rick Rock	3:44
5.	"Phenomonon"		3:39
6.	"Happy Birthday"	League Of Starz	2:22
7.	"Dic Walk" (featuring Kurupt)		4:31
8.	"N My Life Tyme" (featuring Kurupt)	Dâm-funk	4:23
9.	"Best Friend"	KJ Conteh	4:13
10.	"Sho You Right" (featuring Shon'Lawon)	Dâm-funk	3:47
11.	"What's Yo Pleasure"	Dâm-funk	3:47
12.	"It's Not a Secret" (featuring Shon'Lawon)	Dâm-funk	4:03
13.	"Keep'a Nigga High"	League Of Starz	3:31
14.	"We'll Miss U"	DJ 2High	3:28

== See also ==
- 2016 in hip hop music
