= Dat Whoopty Woop =

Studio album by Soopafly
- Released: July 31, 2001
- Recorded: 1997–1998
- Genre: West Coast hip hop
- Length: 1:12:18
- Label: D.P.G.; Navarre
- Producer: Daz Dillinger (also exec.); Soopafly

Soopafly chronology
Dat Whoopty Woop (2001)	Bangin West Coast (2007)

Singles from Dat Whoopty Woop
- 1. "Like It Or Not" Released: 1999

Professional ratings
Review scores
Source	Rating
Altrap	7/10

Dat Whoopty Woop is the debut studio album by American rapper and record producer Soopafly. It was released on July 31, 2001, through D.P.G. Recordz and distributed by Navarre Corporation. Production was handled by Daz Dillinger, who also served as executive producer, and Soopafly himself. It features guest appearances from Daz Dillinger, Big Tray Deee, Bad Azz, Crooked I, Lil' C-Style, Gonzoe, Kurupt, Richie Rich, Snoop Dogg and Xzibit.

The album is composed mostly of unused tracks recorded for Death Row Records. The song "Pimp City" was included as LP and cassette bonus track for Daz' 1998 album Retaliation, Revenge and Get Back, "Like It or Not" featured on 1999 Death Row compilation album Suge Knight Represents: Chronic 2000 (Still Smokin'), and "Way Too Often" appeared on Death Row Presents... Tha Dogg Pound 2002, which was released on the same date as Dat Whoopty Woop.

== Track listing ==
No.	Title	Length
1.	"Y'all Niggaz Betta Recognize"	3:05
2.	"This Type of Flow"	4:05
3.	"Hell Yeah" (featuring Tray Deee)	4:28
4.	"Can I Git Bucc" (featuring Crooked I and Daz Dillinger)	4:19
5.	"Way 2 Often" (featuring Kurupt)	4:23
6.	"Everyday" (featuring Lil' C-Style, Tray Deee and Bad Azz)	4:29
7.	"There Will Never Be Another" (featuring Daz Dillinger, Richie Rich and Gonzoe)	4:42
8.	"Bacc 2 L.A." (featuring Daz Dillinger and Xzibit)	4:49
9.	"Like It or Not"	5:00
10.	"Dat Whoopty Woop" (featuring Snoop Dogg)	5:47
11.	"Pimp City" (featuring Daz Dillinger)	5:10
12.	"Phone Conversation"	5:12
13.	"Playing Games"	3:14
14.	"Why You Wanna Act This Way"	4:01
15.	"Freak Freak"	4:23
16.	"Baby Boy" (featuring Jewell)	5:11
Total length:		1:12:18

Notes

- Track 14 features uncredited vocals from Bad Azz and Big Pimpin' Delemond
- Track 16 features uncredited vocals from Jewell

== Personnel ==
- Priest "Soopafly" Brooks – vocals, producer, mixing
- Tracy "Tray Deee" Davis – vocals (tracks: 3, 6)
- Delmar "Daz Dillinger" Arnaud – vocals (tracks: 4, 7, 8, 11), producer, mixing, executive producer
- Dominick "Crooked I" Wickliffe – vocals (track 4)
- Ricardo "Kurupt" Brown – vocals (track 5)
- Ronald "Lil' C-Style" Gillion – vocals (track 6)
- Jamarr "Bad Azz" Stamps – vocals (track 6)
- Richard "Richie Rich" Serrell – vocals (track 7)
- Ronald "Gonzoe" Moore – vocals (track 7)
- Alvin "Xzibit" Joiner – vocals (track 8)
- Calvin "Snoop Dogg" Broadus – vocals (track 10)
- Crimson Hytek – design
