= West Coast Gangsta Shit =

Westcoast Gangsta Shit

Studio album by Daz Dillinger and WC
- Released: June 19, 2013
- Recorded: 2012–13
- Genre: West Coast hip hop; gangsta rap
- Length: 49:47
- Label: Dilly Recordz; Bigg Swang Recordz
- Producer: Amplified; Beanz N Kornbread; Broadway; Dae One; David Gold; DJ 2High; DJ Battlecat; Kj Conteh; Kuddie Fresh; Rob Tee; The Arsonists; TJofthewest; Touch Tone; Trippy Keez

Daz Dillinger chronology
Witit Witit (2012)	Westcoast Gangsta Shit (2013)	Weed Money (2014)

WC chronology
Revenge of the Barracuda (2011)	West Coast Gangsta Shit (2013)

Singles from West Coast Gangsta Shit
- 1. "Late Nite" Released: May 21, 2013; 2. "Wha'cha Gon Do" Released: May 31, 2013

Professional ratings
Review scores
Source	Rating
laut.de	3/5 stars
RapReviews	6.5/10

Westcoast Gangsta Shit is a collaborative studio album by American West Coast hip hop recording artists Daz Dillinger and WC. It was released on June 19, 2013, via Dilly Recordz and Bigg Swang Recordz. Production was handled by Rob Tee, Broadway, DJ 2High, Amplified, Beanz N Kornbread, Dae One, David Gold, DJ Battlecat, Kj Conteh, Kuddie Fresh, TJofthewest, The Arsonists, Touch Tone and Trippy Keez. It features guest appearances from Snoop Dogg and Butch Cassidy.

== Background ==
On April 15, 2013, Daz Dillinger and WC announced that they would be releasing a collaborative album titled West Coast Gangsta Shit on July 2, 2013. The first single from the album "Late Nite" was released on May 21, 2013. The second single from the album "Wha'cha Gon Do" was released on May 31, 2013. The album was later released two weeks early on June 19, 2013. On August 2, 2013, the music video was released for "Don’t Call It A Comeback". On August 22, 2013, the music video was released for "Stay Out The Way" featuring Snoop Dogg.

== Track listing ==
All tracks are written by Delmar Arnaud and William Calhoun, Jr., with additional contributors noted.

No.	Title	Writer(s)	Producer(s)	Length
1.	"Westcoast Gangsta Shit"	Robert Tamu Brown	Touch Tone; Broadway; Rob Tee	3:01
2.	"Stay Out the Way" (featuring Snoop Dogg)	Calvin Broadus	Thee Arsonist	3:38
3.	"Don't Call It a Come Bacc"		Kuddie Fresh	3:47
4.	"When the Shit Goes Down"		Beanz & Kornbread	4:26
5.	"Late Nite"		Kj Conteh	4:32
6.	"Blam Blam"		David Gold; Dae One	3:16
7.	"Don't Get Wet"		DJ Battlecat	3:58
8.	"Roll & Smoke"		Broadway; TJofDaWestunes; Rob Tee	3:54
9.	"Wha'chagondo"	C. Varnado	Trippy Keez	4:22
10.	"Time Will Preveal"		Amplified	3:58
11.	"Dubbz n the Air"	E. Daniels	DJ 2High	3:15
12.	"Alcohol & Drugs"		Rob Tee	2:51
13.	"Moves I Make" (featuring Butch Cassidy)	Danny Means	DJ 2High	4:23
14.	"Outtro" (Gangsta Talk)			1:05
Total length:				49:47

Sample credits

- Track 9 contains elements from "Why You Treat Me So Bad" written by Denzil Foster, Thomas Derrick McElroy and Jay A. King

== Personnel ==
- Delmar "Daz Dillinger" Arnaud – main artist, executive producer
- William "WC" Calhoun Jr. – main artist, executive producer
- Calvin "Snoop Dogg" Broadus – featured artist (track 2)
- Danny "Butch Cassidy" Means – featured artist (track 13)
- Fiji – background vocals (track 10)
- James Broadway – scratches (tracks: 1, 9, 11, 13), producer (tracks: 1, 8)
- Lamar "DJ Crazy Toones" Calhoun – scratching (track 3)
- Jesus – bass (tracks: 11, 13)
- Carlos "Los" McSwain – drums (tracks: 11, 13)
- Masa Ash – keyboards (tracks: 11, 13)
- Stretch Keys – keyboards (track 12)
- Tony "Touch Tone" Issacs – producer (track 1)
- Rob Tee – producer (tracks: 1, 8, 12), engineering, mixing
- The Arsonists – producer (track 2)
- Karrie "Kuddie Fresh" Carroll – producer (track 3)
- Donald Johnson Jr. – producer (track 4)
- Kenneth Roy – producer (track 4)
- Kadjaly "Kj" Conteh – producer (track 5), mixing
- David Gold – producer (track 6)
- Dameon "Dae One" Garrett – producer (track 6)
- Kevin "DJ Battlecat" Gilliam – producer (track 7)
- TJofthewest – producer (track 8)
- C. "Trippy Keez" Varnado – producer (track 9), mixing
- Amplified – producer (track 10)
- E. "DJ 2High" Daniels – producer (tracks: 11, 13)
- Travis "Shaggy" Marshall – mixing
- ZBoy Fro – assistant engineering
- Farid "Fredwreck" Nassar – mastering
