= Witit Witit =

Studio album by Daz Dillinger
- Released: December 4, 2012
- Genre: Hip hop
- Length: 48:51
- Label: Dogg Pound Records; Dilly Recordz
- Producer: Daz Dillinger (also exec.); Dirtyhunidz; Drumma Boy; Maestro; Mike WiLL Made-It; Mood Melodies...; TK Beatz

Daz Dillinger chronology
D.A.Z. (2011)	Witit Witit (2012)	West Coast Gangsta Shit (2013)

Professional ratings
Review scores
Source	Rating
AllMusic	3.5/5 stars

Witit Witit is the fourteenth solo studio album by American rapper and record producer Daz Dillinger. It was released on December 4, 2012, through Dilly Recordz. Production was handled by TK Beatz, Dirtyhunidz, Drumma Boy, Maestro, Mike Will Made It, Mood Melodies..., and Daz himself, who also served as executive producer. It features guest appearances from Skyy, 8Ball, Crystal, Gwop Nino, Khujo and Mz Jenise.

Track listing and cover art were revealed on November 14, 2012.

== Track listing ==
No.	Title	Producer(s)	Length
1.	"Y.N.W.K.U. (YoungNiggasWillKillU)"	Daz Dillinger	0:47
2.	"Street Money"	Mike WiLL Made-It	4:34
3.	"4 tha Hood" (featuring Sky Keeton and Mz Jenise)	Mood Melodies...	4:05
4.	"1 on 1"	T.K. Beatz	2:54
5.	"Ryd'n"	Drumma Boy	4:02
6.	"Once Again"	T.K. Beatz	4:32
7.	"Hold Up" (featuring Crystal)	T.K. Beatz	5:11
8.	"Come Thru" (featuring Sky Keeton)	Maestro	3:16
9.	"My Bitch"	T.K. Beatz	4:56
10.	"Ball It Up" (featuring Khujo)	T.K. Beatz	3:08
11.	"Goin Gorilla"	T.K. Beatz	3:50
12.	"D-Boy Money" (featuring 8Ball and Gwop Nino)	DirtyHunidz	3:48
13.	"Witit Witit"	T.K. Beatz	3:56
Total length:			48:51

== Personnel ==
- Delmar "Daz Dillinger" Arnaud – vocals, producer (track 1), executive producer
- Skyler Synclair "Skyy" Keeton – vocals (tracks: 3, 8)
- Mz Jenise – vocals (track 3)
- Crystal Varnado – vocals (track 7)
- Willie "Khujo Goodie" Knighton – vocals (track 10)
- Premro "8Ball" Smith – vocals (track 12)
- Gwop Nino – vocals (track 12)
- Michael "Mike WiLL Made-It" Williams II – producer (track 2)
- Mood Melodies... – producer (track 3)
- TK Beatz – producer (tracks: 4, 6, 7, 9–11, 13), mixing
- Christopher "Drumma Boy" Gholson – producer (track 5)
- Vaushaun "Maestro" Brooks – producer (track 8)
- Dirtyhunidz – producer (track 12)
