= Same Day, Different Shit =

Studio album by Young Gotti
- Released: June 27, 2006
- Recorded: November 2005–March 2006
- Genre: West Coast hip-hop; gangsta rap
- Length: 48:18
- Label: D.P.G. Recordz; Fontana; UMG
- Producer: Daz Dillinger

Young Gotti chronology
Against tha Grain (2005)	Same Day, Different Shit (2006)	Streetlights (2010)

Professional ratings
Review scores
Source	Rating
Rapreviews	(8/10)
HipHopRapCityCute	9/10 stars
BrainOfHipHop	4.0/5 stars

Same Day, Different Shit is the fifth studio album by American rapper Kurupt. It was released under the name Young Gotti, which was a nickname given to Kurupt by Tupac Shakur. He joined Daz's D.P.G. Recordz soon after the Western Conference in July 2005. The lyrics of all the tracks on this album are written by Kurupt, he had to use his brother's publishing Young Roscoe it is believed due to contract reasons, with help of Daz Dillinger.

== Commercial performance ==
The album reached at number fifty-nine on the US Billboard R&B/Hip-Hop Albums charts in 2006.

== Track listing ==
No.	Title	Writer(s)	Producer(s)	Length
1.	"Young Gotti Intro"	Ricardo Brown; Delmar Arnaud	Daz Dillinger	1:16
2.	"Scrape Thru tha Hood"	Brown; Arnaud	Daz Dillinger	4:22
3.	"Make That Ass Shake"	Brown; Arnaud	Daz Dillinger	3:19
4.	"I Get High 2"	Brown; Arnaud	Daz Dillinger	4:08
5.	"As Time Fly By" (performed by Tha Dogg Pound)	Brown; Arnaud	Daz Dillinger	5:08
6.	"Gangstaz Pt. 2" (performed by Tha Dogg Pound)	Brown; Arnaud	Daz Dillinger	4:43
7.	"Ryde & Roll"	Brown; Arnaud	Daz Dillinger	3:37
8.	"What Can I Do" (feat. Ashthon Jones)	Brown; Ashthon Jones; Arnaud	Daz Dillinger	4:35
9.	"Yes I'm Quiccer"	Brown; Arnaud	Daz Dillinger	3:09
10.	"Shoot 'Em Up" (skit)			0:29
11.	"Accessories (Nina Breeda)"	Brown; Arnaud	Daz Dillinger	4:15
12.	"I Did It"	Brown; Arnaud	Daz Dillinger	3:41
13.	"Ain't That Somethin'" (performed by Tha Dogg Pound)	Brown; Arnaud	Daz Dillinger	4:48
14.	"Young Gotti Outro"	Brown; Arnaud	Daz Dillinger	0:48
Total length:				48:18

Sample credits

- "Ryde & Roll" contains a sample of "Time Will Reveal" performed by DeBarge

== Personnel ==
Credits for Same Day, Different Shit adapted from Allmusic.

- Alex "Toon" Deligiannis – Artwork, Design
- Daz Dillinger – Guest Artist, Primary Artist
- Adam Hill – Assistant Engineer
- I. Johnson – Composer
- Ivan Johnson – Producer
- Ashthon Jones – Primary Artist
- Kurupt – Primary Artist
- Fredwreck Nassar – Digital Photography
- Kevin Nick – Mastering
- Larry Nick – Mastering
- Lasoniata Shaw – Mixing
- Arnold "Bigg A" White – Promotions Director
- Young Gotti – Primary Artist

== Chart positions ==
Chart (2006)	Position
US Billboard R&B/Hip-Hop Albums	59

== See also ==
- List of albums
- 2006 in music
