= 2002 (Tha Dogg Pound album) =

Death Row Presents... Tha Dogg Pound 2002

Compilation album by Tha Dogg Pound
- Released: July 31, 2001
- Recorded: 1995–1998
- Genres: West Coast hip hop; gangsta rap; g-funk
- Length: 1:10:13
- Labels: Death Row; D3
- Producers: Cold 187um; Daz Dillinger; Fredwreck; Soopafly; Rick Rock; Darren Vegas

Tha Dogg Pound chronology
Dillinger & Young Gotti (2001)	Death Row Presents... Tha Dogg Pound 2002 (2001)	The Last of Tha Pound (2004)

Singles from 2002
- 1. "Just Doggin'" Released: 2001

Professional ratings
Review scores
Source	Rating
AllMusic	2.5/5 stars
Entertainment Weekly	C−
Los Angeles Times	3/4 stars
RapReviews	6.5/10
XXL	M (2/5)

Death Row Presents... Tha Dogg Pound 2002 is the first compilation album by American West Coast hip hop group Tha Dogg Pound. It was released on July 31, 2001 by Death Row Records and D3 Entertainment.

It comprises unreleased material recorded by Tha Dogg Pound while they were signed on to Death Row Records, remixed and updated by the then-head producer Cold 187um. Tha Dogg Pound were signed to Daz Dillinger's D.P.G. Recordz and released their own album that year called Dillinger & Young Gotti under DPG alias. The album title is meant to imply it is a sequel or response of sorts to Dr. Dre's 2001. The album cover has pictures of Daz and Kurupt from the 1996 Death Row roster picture.

The album's lead single, "Just Doggin'", peaked at number 99 on both the Billboard Hot 100 and UK Singles Chart.

== Track listing ==
No.	Title	Writer(s)	Producer(s)	Length
1.	"Intro"			1:50
2.	"Roll Wit Us"	Ricardo Brown; Delmar Arnaud; Marion Knight, Jr.	Cold 187um; Darren Vegas	5:11
3.	"Just Doggin'" (featuring Nate Dogg)	Brown; Arnaud; Nathaniel Hale; Knight, Jr.	Cold 187um	4:45
4.	"Smoke" (featuring Snoop Dogg & The Relativez)	Brown; Calvin Broadus	Cold 187um; Darren Vegas	4:48
5.	"Gangsta Rap" (featuring Crooked I)	Brown; Arnaud; Dominic Wickliffe	Fredwreck	4:32
6.	"10 Til Midnight" (featuring SKG)	Brown; Knight, Jr.	Cold 187um; Darren Vegas	5:49
7.	"Living Tha Gangsta Life" (featuring Xzibit)	Brown; Arnaud; Alvin Joiner	Daz Dillinger	3:45
8.	"Don't Stop" (featuring 2Pac)	Brown; Arnaud; Tupac Shakur	Daz Dillinger	4:03
9.	"Change the Game (Remix)" (featuring Jay-Z, Beanie Sigel & Memphis Bleek)	Shawn Carter; Dwight Grant; Stephen Garrett; Ricardo Thomas	Rick Rock	4:53
10.	"Crip Wit Us"	Brown; Arnaud	Daz Dillinger	3:52
11.	"What Cha About"	Brown; Knight, Jr.	Cold 187um; Darren Vegas	4:34
12.	"Your Gyrlfriend" (featuring Mac Shawn & Soopafly)	Arnaud; DeShawn Dawson; Priest Brooks	Daz Dillinger	3:59
13.	"Feels Good"	Brown; Arnaud; LaToiya Williams	Daz Dillinger	4:46
14.	"Way Too Often" (featuring Soopafly)	Brown; Brooks	Soopafly	4:15
15.	"It'z All About That Money"	Arnaud	Daz Dillinger	4:00
16.	"Every Single Day" (featuring Snoop Dogg)	Brown; Arnaud; Broadus	Daz Dillinger	5:10
Total length:				1:10:13

== Charts ==
Chart performance for Death Row Presents... Tha Dogg Pound 2002
Chart (2001)	Peak position
French Albums (SNEP)	78
