= DPGC: U Know What I'm Throwin' Up =

Studio album by Daz Dillinger
- Released: May 6, 2003
- Recorded: 2002–03
- Studio: Tha Chuuch Studio; Tha Wreckshop Studio; Fly2K Studio; Gangsta Advisory Studio
- Genre: West Coast hip hop
- Length: 1:17:47
- Label: Gangsta Advisory
- Producer: Daz Dillinger; Def Jef; Fredwreck; Meech Wells; Mike Smoove; Quazedelic; Shon Don; Soopafly

Daz Dillinger chronology
This Is the Life I Lead (2002)	DPGC: U Know What I'm Throwin' Up (2003)	I Got Love in These Streetz (2004)

Singles from DPGC: U Know What I'm Throwin' Up
- 1. "Dogg Catcha" Released: 2003

DPGC: U Know What I'm Throwin' Up is the fourth solo studio album by American rapper and record producer Daz Dillinger. It was released on May 6, 2003 via Gangsta Advisory Records, making it his first album for the label. Production was handled by Soopafly, Fredwreck, Shon Don, Def Jef, Meech Wells, Mike Smoove, Quaze, and Daz himself, who also served as executive producer. It features guest appearances from Snoop Dogg, Soopafly, Shon Don, Bad Azz, Crystal, E-White, Goldie Loc, Uncle Reo and Whiteboy. The album did not reach the Billboard 200, however it peaked at number 35 on the Top R&B/Hip-Hop Albums and number 13 on the Independent Albums charts in the United States.

The album contains multiple diss tracks aimed at Death Row Records, its chief executive officer Suge Knight, ex-Tha Dogg Pound groupmate Kurupt who re-signed himself with the label, Crooked I and other Death Row affiliates, as well as Ja Rule and Benzino.

== Critical reception ==
Professional ratings
Review scores
Source	Rating
AllMusic	3/5 stars
RapReviews	7.5/10

AllMusic's Jason Birchmeier praised the album for being an upgrade over Daz's mixtapes, emphasizing both songwriting and guest appearances to develop the "tracks into actual songs", highlighting the Snoop Dogg and Soopafly collaborations as "particularly noteworthy". He concluded that: "Overall, DPGC is one of Daz's best and one to look for if you're a fan." Steve 'Flash' Juon of RapReviews wrote: "Taken strictly at face value "DPGC: U Know What I'm Throwin' Up" is his best solo album to date, lyrically and musically. If he'd cut back on the number of skits, produce a few of the songs himself, and get the obligatory guest like Redman or Nas on a track, the next album could straight murder the music business, or Suge himself – whichever he reaches first."

== Track listing ==
No.	Title	Writer(s)	Producer(s)	Length
1.	"Bigg Snoop Dogg Intro" (featuring Snoop Dogg)			0:32
2.	"I'll Beacho Azz" (featuring Soopafly)	Delmar Arnaud; Priest Brooks	Soopafly	4:38
3.	"Public Service Announcement"			0:15
4.	"U Ain't Shit" (featuring Bad Azz)	Arnaud; Jamarr Stamps; P. Brooks	Soopafly	3:28
5.	"WBALLZ (Interlude)"			0:21
6.	"Dogg Catcha" (featuring Soopafly)	Arnaud; P. Brooks	Soopafly	4:40
7.	"Snoopy Collins (Interlude)" (featuring Snoop Dogg)			0:10
8.	"All Night Long"	Arnaud; Mike Smoove	Mike Smoove	3:59
9.	"It's Dat Gangsta Shit" (featuring Snoop Dogg)		Quaze	4:08
10.	"Skirt Out"	Arnaud; Farid Nassar	Fredwreck	3:51
11.	"Snoop (Interlude): Suck Me" (featuring Snoop Dogg)			0:07
12.	"Don't Stop" (featuring Soopafly)	Arnaud; P. Brooks	Soopafly	3:48
13.	"Snoop (Interlude): Quit Playin'" (featuring Snoop Dogg)			0:16
14.	"Can't Stop That Gangsta Shit"		Soopafly	3:55
15.	"Snoop (Interlude): Kick Some Gangsta Shit" (featuring Snoop Dogg)			0:08
16.	"Deez Niggaz Trippin'" (featuring Soopafly)	Arnaud; P. Brooks	Soopafly	4:14
17.	"Introduction 2 Mayhem"		Soopafly	3:18
18.	"WBALLZ (Interlude)"			0:06
19.	"Round n Round We Go" (featuring Shon Don)	Arnaud; Shon Brooks; P. Brooks	Soopafly	4:07
20.	"DPGC: U Know What I'm Throwin' Up" (featuring Snoop Dogg and Goldie Loc)	Arnaud; Broadus; Keiwan Spillman	Fredwreck	5:06
21.	"Pimpin' Olympics (Interlude)"			0:30
22.	"Ain't Nothin' But a Gangsta Party, Pt. 2" (featuring Whiteboy Ryan)	Arnaud; Nassar	Fredwreck	4:49
23.	"I Got Dat Fire (Interlude)"			0:30
24.	"I Got Dat Fire" (featuring Snoop Dogg, E-White and Uncle Reo)	Arnaud; Broadus; Eric White; Cecil Demetrius Womack Jr.	Meech Wells; Def Jef	4:07
25.	"Snoop (Interlude): Reminisce" (featuring Snoop Dogg)			0:37
26.	"World So Cold (I'll Beacho Azz Remix)" (featuring Shon Don)	Arnaud; S. Brooks; Nassar	Fredwreck	4:26
27.	"A Message to Ricardo Brown"		Dat Nigga Daz	1:51
28.	"Church (Interlude)"			0:41
29.	"Who Dem Niggaz"	Arnaud; S. Brooks; J.J. Gizmo; Do-Low	Shon Don	4:27
30.	"Let's Roll" (featuring Crystal and Shon Don)	Arnaud; Crystal Varnado; S. Brooks	Shon Don	3:26
31.	"A Message from Delmar Arnaud"			1:16
Total length:				1:17:47

== Personnel ==
- Delmar "Daz Dillinger" Arnaud – vocals, producer, executive producer
- Calvin "Snoop Dogg" Broadus – vocals
- Priest "Soopafly" Brooks – vocals, producer
- Shon Dornae "Shon Don" Brooks – vocals, producer
- Jamarr "Bad Azz" Stamps – vocals
- Crystal Varnado – vocals
- Eric "E-White" White – vocals
- Keiwan "Goldie Loc" Spillman – vocals
- Reo Varnado – vocals
- Whiteboy Ryan – vocals
- Farid "Fredwreck" Nassar – producer
- Jeffrey "Def Jef" Fortson – producer
- Cecil Demetrius "Meech Wells" Womack Jr. – producer
- Mike Smoove – producer
- Stanley "Quaze" Harris – producer
- Dave Arron – mastering
- Alex Deligiannis – artwork, design
- Arnold "Bigg A" White – photography

== Charts ==
Chart (2003)	Peak position
US Top R&B/Hip-Hop Albums (Billboard)	35
US Independent Albums (Billboard)	13
