= D.A.Z. (album) =

Studio album by Daz Dillinger
- Released: April 19, 2011
- Recorded: 2010–2011
- Genre: West Coast hip hop
- Length: 51:21
- Label: Felder Entertainment
- Producer: Daz Dillinger (also exec.); Ivan Johnson; Tha Chill

Daz Dillinger chronology
Matter of Dayz (2010)	D.A.Z. (2011)	Witit Witit (2012)

Professional ratings
Review scores
Source	Rating
HipHopDX	2/5

D.A.Z. is the thirteenth solo studio album by American rapper and record producer Daz Dillinger. It was released on April 19, 2011, through Felder Entertainment Inc. Production was handled by Ivan Johnson, Tha Chill, and Daz himself, who also served as executive producer. It features guest appearances from Cricet, Crystal, Ice Cube, Kurupt, Lee Majors, Mac Shawn, Sly Boogy, Snoop Dogg, Soopafly, Tony Terry and WC.

== Track listing ==
No.	Title	Writer(s)	Producer(s)	Length
1.	"Intro: Aint Tell'n What Goes On"	Delmar Arnaud; Ivan Johnson	Daz Dillinger; Ivan Johnson	1:15
2.	"D.A.Z. (Destruction Adds up to Zero)"	Arnaud; Johnson; H. Moore	Daz Dillinger; Ivan Johnson	3:53
3.	"Set It Off" (featuring Snoop Dogg)	Arnaud; Calvin Broadus; Johnson	Daz Dillinger; Ivan Johnson	4:22
4.	"$till Get'n Money"	Arnaud; Johnson; H. Moore	Daz Dillinger; Ivan Johnson	4:15
5.	"G Spot"	Arnaud; Johnson; E. Daniel	Daz Dillinger; Ivan Johnson	4:49
6.	"Let's Get N2 Something" (featuring Tony Terry)	Arnaud; Tony Terry; Johnson; H. Moore	Daz Dillinger; Ivan Johnson	4:43
7.	"My Homegirl" (featuring Kurupt)	Arnaud; Ricardo Brown; Johnson; E. Daniel	Daz Dillinger; Ivan Johnson	3:43
8.	"I'm Cool on U" (featuring Crystal and Mac Shawn)	Arnaud; Crystal Varnado; DeShawn Dawson	Tha Chill	3:54
9.	"You Know" (featuring Lee Majors and Criccet)	Arnaud; Johnson; E. Daniel	Daz Dillinger; Ivan Johnson	4:36
10.	"Iz U Ready 2 Die" (featuring Ice Cube)	Arnaud; O'Shea Jackson; Johnson; E. Daniel	Daz Dillinger; Ivan Johnson	3:46
11.	"D.P.G.-4-L.I.F.E."	Arnaud; Johnson; H. Moore	Daz Dillinger; Ivan Johnson	4:33
12.	"No Hand Out's or Favors" (featuring Sly Boogy)	Arnaud; Timothy Martin; Johnson; E. Daniel	Daz Dillinger; Ivan Johnson	4:08
13.	"Don't U Eva 4 Get" (featuring WC and Soopafly)	Arnaud; Johnson; E. Daniel	Daz Dillinger; Ivan Johnson	3:31
Total length:				51:28

== Personnel ==
- Delmar "Daz Dillinger" Arnaud – vocals, producer (tracks: 1–7, 9–13), executive producer
- Calvin "Snoop Dogg" Broadus – vocals (track 3)
- Tony Terry – vocals (track 6)
- Ricardo "Kurupt" Brown – vocals (track 7)
- Crystal Varnado – vocals (track 8)
- DeShawn "Mac Shawn" Dawson – vocals (track 8)
- Ali "Lee Majors" Pecot – vocals (track 9)
- Arner "Cricet" Moering – vocals (track 9)
- O'Shea "Ice Cube" Jackson – vocals (track 10)
- Timothy "Sly Boogie" Martin – vocals (track 12)
- William "W.C." Calhoun Jr. – vocals (track 13)
- Priest "Soopafly" Brooks – vocals (track 13)
- Ivan Johnson – producer (tracks: 1–7, 9–13)
- Vernon "Tha Chill" Johnson – producer (track 8)
- David Lopez – mixing, mastering
- Arnold "Bigg A" White – marketing, promotion
