= Big Tray Deee =

American rapper (born 1966)

- Also known as: Tray Deee; Tray D
- Born: Tracy Lamar Davis; April 27, 1966 (age 60); East St. Louis, Illinois, U.S.
- Origin: Long Beach, California
- Genres: Hip-hop; gangsta rap
- Occupations: Rapper; songwriter
- Years active: 1994–2004, 2014–present
- Labels: Doggystyle; TVT; Supreme Circle Music Group
- Member of: Tha Eastsidaz

Tracy Lamar Davis (born April 27, 1966), better known as Big Tray Deee or simply Tray Deee, is an American rapper. He is a member of rap group Tha Eastsidaz (alongside Goldie Loc and Snoop Dogg), as well as the Diirty OGz (alongside Tha Chill, Kurupt and Weazel Loc).

== Career ==
Before becoming a rapper, Davis was an active gang member. Tray Deee is a member of the Insane Crips Gang in Long Beach, California. Tray Deee made his first appearance on Snoop Doggy Dogg's Murder Was the Case soundtrack in 1994, guest starring on the track "21 Jumpstreet", Tray Dee also featured on the song Reality off the Doggfood album in 1995, followed by an appearance on Tha Doggfather in 1996. In 1999, he joined the Platinum-selling group Tha Eastsidaz, which consisted of himself, Snoop Dogg and Goldie Loc. The group released two albums. Simultaneously and after the Eastsidaz project he was affiliated with car club-street band the IV Life Family. He later signed to the related record label IV Life Records.

In 2014, Tray Deee announced his intention to release his debut solo album, following a series of mixtapes. The first of these mixtapes, Long Beach State of Mind, Vol. I, was recorded while Tray Deee was incarcerated, on a smart phone in a makeshift vocal booth made from blankets and boxes in his cell. On April 18 and 19, Tray Deee reunited with Goldie Loc to perform at "Krush Groove 2014" at Save Mart Center in Fresno and The Forum in Inglewood.

In 2016, Tray Deee stated that it is unlikely that there will ever be another Eastsidaz album.

== Legal issues ==
On February 2, 2005, he was sentenced to twelve years in prison for attempted murder, stemming from a 2003 incident in which he fired at rival gang members. He was imprisoned at California Men's Colony in San Luis Obispo, California for nine years. He was released from prison on April 3, 2014.

== Discography ==
=== Studio albums ===
- The 3rd Coming (2016)
- The General's List II (2018)
- The Certified Project (2019)
- Malice (2023)

=== Collaborative albums ===
- Tha Eastsidaz (2000) (with Tha Eastsidaz)
- Duces 'n Trayz: The Old Fashioned Way (2001) (with Tha Eastsidaz)
- We Got Now and Next (2016) (with Diirty OGz)
- Still Easty (2024) (with Tha Eastsidaz)

=== Compilation albums ===
- The General's List (2002)

=== Mixtapes ===
- That's My Work 4 (2014) (with Tha Eastsidaz)
- Long Beach State of Mind, Vol. I: The Mixtape (2014)
- Long Beach State of Mind, Vol. II: Street Officials (2016)

=== Singles ===
==== As lead artist ====
List of singles as lead artist, with other performing artists, showing year released and album name
| Title | Year | Album |
|---|---|---|
| "Iz U wit It" | 2002 | The General's List |
| "Blazin' Endo" (featuring Bam) | 2003 | The General's List |
| "On the Blocc" | 2015 | The 3rd Coming |
| "The Return" (featuring Kokane) | 2016 | The 3rd Coming |
| "Moved Up!" (featuring O.T. Genasis and Coniyac) | 2016 | The 3rd Coming |
| "CantFucWitDis" (featuring Coniyac) | 2016 | The 3rd Coming |
| "Diirty Outlawz" (featuring The Outlawz and Diirty OGz) | 2016 | The 3rd Coming |
| "Life of a G" (featuring Snoop Dogg) | 2017 | The General's List II |
| "Outchea" (featuring Coniyac, GI Joe, Pacman Da Gunman and ES Crow) | 2017 | The Certified Project |
| "Gangsta" (featuring DW Flame) | 2018 | The General's List II |
| "True Life Storiez" (featuring BG Perico and Crooked I) | 2018 | The General's List II |
| "UKnowDaName" (featuring Coniyac, DW Flame, ESCrow and Red G'zus) | 2019 | The Certified Project |
| "Cold World / Different" (featuring Coniyac and Kola) | 2019 | The Certified Project |
| "Boiling Point" | 2020 | Non-album single |
| "45 Lawz of G'izm" | 2021 | Non-album single |
| "Buzherk" | 2023 | Malice |
| "Swear on the Set" | 2023 | Malice |

==== As featured artist ====
List of singles as featured artist, with other performing artists, showing year released and album name
| Title | Year | Peak chart positions | | | Album |
| Title | Year | US | US R&B | US Rap | Album |
|---|---|---|---|---|---|
| "Beware of My Crew" (LBC Crew featuring Roger Troutman, Tray Deee, South Sentrell and Nate Dogg) | 1995 | 75 | 51 | 8 | A Thin Line Between Love and Hate soundtrack |
| "Keep It Gangsta" (Livio featuring Tray Deee) | 2001 | — | — | — | My Life, Vol. 1 |
| "No Prisoners" (Certified featuring Big Tray Deee) | 2017 | — | — | — | Non-album single |
| "Heat" (Biggg Slim featuring Big Tray Deee) | 2019 | — | — | — | Non-album single |

==== Promotional singles ====
List of promotional singles as lead and featured artist, with other performing artists, showing year released and album name
| Title | Year | Album |
|---|---|---|
| "Way Too Major" (with Daz Dillinger) | 1997 | Gang Related soundtrack |
| "Breakout" (with Kokane) | 1999 | S.I. Riders |
| "Clockin' C Notes" (Made Men featuring Soopafly, Tha Dogg Pound and Tray Deee) | 1999 | Classic Limited Edition |
| "Represent Dat G.C." (Kurupt featuring Daz Dillinger, Soopafly, Tray Deee, Jayo Felony, Snoop Dogg and Butch Cassidy) | 2000 | Tha Streetz Iz a Mutha |
| "Cali Way" (with Mr. Mash and Kokane) | 2001 | West Next |

=== Guest appearances ===
List of non-single guest appearances, with other performing artists, showing year released and album name
| Title | Year | Other artist(s) | Album |
|---|---|---|---|
| "21 Jumpstreet" | 1994 | Snoop Doggy Dogg | Murder Was the Case |
| "Droppin' Bombz" | 1995 | South Sentrell | The Show soundtrack |
| "Reality" | 1995 | Tha Dogg Pound | Dogg Food |
| "Dippin' in My Low Low" | 1996 | Techniec, Lil' C-Style, South Sentrell, Snoop Doggy Dogg, Coco Loc | Haven't You Heard |
| "Feels Good 2 B DPG" | 1996 | Lil' C-Style, Snoop Doggy Dogg, Nate Dogg, DJ Pooh, Fuski | Haven't You Heard |
| "Doggfather's Disciple" | 1996 | Techniec, Bad Azz, Bo-Roc | Haven't You Heard |
| "Jacca's Reunion" | 1996 | Techniec, Bad Azz, Lil' C-Style, Snoop Doggy Dogg, Big C-Style | Haven't You Heard |
| "One 213" | 1996 | Techniec, Snoop Doggy Dogg, McGruff, Soopafly, Dat Nigga Daz | Haven't You Heard |
| "(O.J.) Wake Up" | 1996 | Snoop Doggy Dogg | Tha Doggfather |
| "Downtown Assassins" | 1996 | Snoop Doggy Dogg, Dat Nigga Daz | Tha Doggfather |
| "Out the Moon (Boom, Boom, Boom)" | 1997 | Snoop Doggy Dogg, Soopafly, Bad Azz, Techniec, 2Pac | Gridlock'd soundtrack |
| "Bag o' Weed" | 1997 | Nate Dogg | G-Funk Classics, Vol. 1 & 2 |
| "Get Money" | 1997 | DJ Pooh, Charlie Wilson, Threat | Bad Newz Travels Fast |
| "Gangsta Vocabulary" | 1997 | DJ Pooh, Threat | Bad Newz Travels Fast |
| "East Side Madness" | 1997 | Swoop G, T-Luni | Undisputed |
| "Hollywood Bank Robbery" | 1997 | Tha Dogg Pound, Snoop Doggy Dogg | Gang Related soundtrack |
| "Gang Related" | 1997 | CJ Mac, WC, Dat Nigga Daz | Gang Related soundtrack |
| "My Life" | 1998 | Storm, Big Syke, Val Young | None |
| "Paper Chase" | 1998 | Lil' Tip, Colo Loco, Sho Shot, Beau Dozier, Lil' C-Style | 19th Street LBC Compilation |
| "Rap Killer" | 1998 | Techniec, Lil' J, J-Money, Shorty K, Lil' Tip, Crooked I | 19th Street LBC Compilation |
| "Watchin' You Watchin' Me" | 1998 | AI Style, Sho Shot, Legacy, Shorty K, Lil' J | 19th Street LBC Compilation |
| "Gangsta Gangsta" | 1998 | Sho Shot, Miss Coco, Legacy, Crooked I, J-Money | 19th Street LBC Compilation |
| "Flossin'" | 1998 | Baby Girl, Salim H. Grant, Bad Azz, Lil' C-Style | 19th Street LBC Compilation |
| "Gang Bangin' Ass Criminal" | 1998 | Daz Dillinger, Ty Cuzz, Kurupt, Soopafly, Bad Azz, Techniec | Retaliation, Revenge & Get Back |
| "Oh No" | 1998 | Daz Dillinger, J-Money | Retaliation, Revenge & Get Back |
| ""Thank God for My Life" | 1998 | Daz Dillinger, Bad Azz, Soopafly, Big Pimpin' Delemond | Retaliation, Revenge & Get Back |
| "All Aboard" | 1998 | Twinz | Straight Outta Cali |
| "King Pin" | 1998 | J-Money, Kurupt, Crooked I | Straight Outta Cali |
| "It's Goin' Down" | 1998 | J-Money, Legacy, Shorty K | Straight Outta Cali |
| "Don't Test Me" | 1998 | Sho Shot, Bo-Roc, J-Money, Crooked I, Legacy | Straight Outta Cali |
| "Way Too Crazy" | 1998 | Jayo Felony, Daz Dillinger | Rush Hour soundtrack |
| "Everythang Happens fo' a Reason" | 1998 | Bad Azz | Word on tha Streets |
| "C-Walk" | 1998 | Kurupt, Slip Capone | Kuruption! |
| "Gangsta Shit's Like a Drug" | 1998 | Mack 10, Squeak Ru | The Recipe |
| "One More Lick" | 1998 | TQ | They Never Saw Me Coming |
| "Turf Stories" | 1999 | Mac Shawn, Daz Dillinger | Turf Stories |
| "Hell Ya" | 1999 | Soopafly | Whiteboys soundtrack / Dat Whoopty Woop |
| "Throw It Up" | 1999 | Rappin' 4-Tay, Snoop Dogg, Roger Troutman | Introduction to Mackin' / Still More Bounce |
| "Neva Gonna Give It Up" | 1999 | Kurupt, 213, Soopafly | Tha Streetz Iz a Mutha |
| "It Ain't About You" | 1999 | Kurupt, Soopafly, Latoya Williams | Tha Streetz Iz a Mutha |
| "Midnight Creep" | 2000 | Radio, Lil 1/2 Dead | Heated |
| "Ta Get 'N" | 2000 | C-Lim | What Dat 'N' Like |
| "I'd Rather Lie 2 Ya" | 2000 | Daz Dillinger, Kurupt | R.A.W. |
| "U Ain't Know'n" | 2000 | Daz Dillinger | R.A.W. |
| "Baccstabber" | 2000 | Daz Dillinger, Mark Morrison | R.A.W. / Innocent Man |
| "Ride or Die" | 2000 | Spice 1, Yukmouth, Jayo Felony | The Playa Rich Project |
| "Everyday" | 2001 | Soopafly, Lil' C-Style, Bad Azz | Dat Whoopty Whoop |
| "Don't Hate" | 2001 | Nate Dogg, Bad Azz, R.G. | Heated |
| "Fuck with Us" | 2001 | Kurupt, Xzibit | Bones soundtrack |
| "Eastside" | 2001 | Snoop Doggy Dogg, Daz Dillinger | Death Row's Snoop Doggy Dogg Greatest Hits |
| "Kick Rocks" | 2001 | Ras Kass | None |
| "G's & Hustlas" | 2002 | C-Bo | Life as a Rider |
| "Thuggin'" | 2002 | Spice 1, Kokane | Spiceberg Slim |
| "Cali Swangin' (Remix)" | 2002 | IV Life Family | IV Life Underground, Vol. 1 |
| "Clap Your Hands" | 2002 | Too Cool, Young Buc, Kokane, Bad Azz | IV Life Underground, Vol. 1 |
| "Nuthin' Has Changed" | 2002 | King Tee, Kool G Rap | The Kingdom Come |
| "Still a G Thang" | 2002 | Notorious G's | Bay 2 L.A.: Westside Badboys 2 |
| "Born to Die" | 2002 | Foesum, Twinz | The Foefathers |
| "Scary Flicc" | 2003 | Caviar, Jayo Felony, Kokane | Hard White |
| "Game" | 2003 | 40 Glocc, Spice 1 | The Jakal |
| "Verbal Driveby" | 2003 | Hobo | City By the Sea |
| "L.A. Streetz from L.B. 2 Compton" | 2003 | Mausberg, Misery | The Compton Blockz |
| "OG...PI..." | 2004 | The Boss Pimps | Pimpin' Off Top |
| "Thou Shall Not Kill" | 2007 | Mobb Deep, Snoop Dogg | The Infamous Archives |
| "License to Kill" | 2015 | DJ Kay Slay, Sammi J, Gunplay, Trae tha Truth, Big K.R.I.T. | The Industry Purge |
| "Anybody Killa" | 2016 | Kokane, Cold 187um, Xzibit | King of G-funk |
| "Eyez Open" | 2016 | Young Noble & Deuce Deuce, Bad Azz | The Code |
| "Don't Make Me" | 2016 | Outlawz | Livin Legendz |
| "Bacc in da Dayz" | 2017 | Snoop Dogg | Neva Left |
| "Ghetto Bird" | 2018 | Daz Dillinger, Freddie Gibbs | Dazamataz |
| "Learn from It" | 2020 | Celly Cel, G Perico | Focused |
| "Stay On" | 2023 | Big Hit | The Truth Is in My Eyes |

== Filmography ==
- A Thin Line Between Love and Hate (1996) - Himself
- Baby Boy (2001) - Knucklehead
- The Wash (2001) - Thug #3
- Tha Eastsidaz (1999/2000) - Crackle
- Crime Partners (2003) - Sam's friend
- Grand Theft Auto Online (2025) - OG AI Assistant

== Bibliography ==
| Title | Release date | Authors | ISBN | Ref. |
|---|---|---|---|---|
| Streetz Gon Cry | 2012 | Tracy "Big Tray Deee" Davis, Anthony Barrow | | |
| Los Angeles Tymez: Urban Tales | 2013 | Tracy "Big Tray Deee" Davis, DaSean "J-Dee" Cooper, Anthony Barrow | | |
