= Long Beach 2 Fillmoe =

Studio album by Daz Dillinger & JT the Bigga Figga
- Released: January 16, 2001
- Recorded: 2000
- Genres: West Coast hip hop; gangsta rap
- Length: 47:20
- Labels: D1A Records; Get Low Recordz; D.P.G. Recordz
- Producers: Daz Dillinger (exec.); JT the Bigga Figga (exec.); Sean T

Daz Dillinger & JT the Bigga Figga chronology
Long Beach 2 Fillmoe (2001)	Game for Sale (2001)

Professional ratings
Review scores
Source	Rating
AllMusic	3/5 stars
RapReviews	7/10 stars

Long Beach 2 Fillmoe is the first collaborative album by American rappers Daz Dillinger & JT the Bigga Figga. It was released on January 16, 2001, via D1A Records/Get Low Recordz/D.P.G. Recordz. The album reached No. 70 on the Billboard Top R&B/Hip-Hop Albums chart and No. 30 on the Independent Albums chart.

== Track listing ==
No.	Title	Length
1.	"What You Gone Do" (featuring Telly Mac)	4:25
2.	"Playing Hard" (featuring The Commisiona)	4:14
3.	"Street Life" (featuring Telly Mac)	3:02
4.	"One Nine" (featuring Lil' C-Style)	3:44
5.	"Fillmoe" (featuring Playa P Dog & The Commisiona)	3:38
6.	"Game for Sale" (featuring The Jacka, Buddah & The Commisiona)	3:18
7.	"Think Smart" (featuring San Quinn & Big Pokey)	3:57
8.	"Still Hustlin'" (featuring Telly Mac, Cozmo & Shawny Moe)	4:05
9.	"Nothing But the Dog" (featuring Telly Mac)	3:59
10.	"Ain't Nothin' Changed" (featuring Killa Tay & Cozmo)	4:01
11.	"Longbeach 2 Fillmoe" (featuring Telly Mac & Killa Tay)	4:48
12.	"No Love" (featuring Telly Mac, The Commisiona & Guce)	4:09
Total length:		47:20

== Charts ==
Chart (2001)	Peak position
US Top R&B/Hip-Hop Albums (Billboard)	70
US Independent Albums (Billboard)	30
