= Tha Streetz Iz a Mutha =

Studio album by Kurupt
- Released: November 16, 1999
- Genres: West Coast hip-hop; gangsta rap; G-funk
- Length: 74:20
- Labels: Antra; Artemis
- Producers: Daz Dillinger (also exec.); Bink!; Blaqthoven; Dr. Dre; Fredwreck; Meech Wells; Organized Noize; Soopafly

Kurupt chronology
Kuruption! (1998)	Tha Streetz Iz a Mutha (1999)	Space Boogie: Smoke Oddessey (2001)

Singles from Tha Streetz Iz a Mutha
- 1. "Girls All Pause" Released: November 1999; 2. "Who Ride Wit Us" Released: January 2000; 3. "Welcome Home" Released: April 2000

Tha Streetz Iz a Mutha is the second studio album by the American rapper Kurupt. It was released on November 16, 1999, through Antra Records with distribution from Artemis Records.

The album contains the single "Who Ride Wit Us". The track "Callin' Out Names" is a diss track directed toward rappers Foxy Brown and DMX.

By January 2001, the album had sold 440,000 copies.

== Recording ==
In an interview with HipHopDX, Kurupt explained his mindset throughout the recording process of Tha Streetz Iz a Mutha: "I was back to gangbangin' and I was back into a real solemn – a real low state, angry and upset and pissed". He tried to avoid it on his later albums.

In October 1999, Kurupt and his entourage were attacked outside the studio Echo Sounds, where he was recording the album. Two armed men confronted them and opened fire. Kurupt's bodyguard Dwayne "Draws" Dupree was pronounced dead at the scene, while rappers Jevon "Tha Realest" Jones and Willard "Act Da Fool" Givers were hospitalized with gunshot wounds. Initial reports linked the attack to the diss track "Calling Out Names", which was released on Tha Streetz Iz a Mutha. In the song, Kurupt verbally attacked DMX – who was rumored to have a relationship with Kurupt's ex-fiancée Foxy Brown – as well as their respective collectives Ruff Ryders and The Firm. In a later statement, Kurupt's label Antra refuted this theory, saying that their staff member was misquoted.

== Critical reception ==
Professional ratings
Review scores
Source	Rating
AllMusic	3/5 stars
Entertainment Weekly	B−
Los Angeles Times	3/4 stars
RapReviews	8.5/10
The Source	4/5 stars
USA Today	3/4 stars
XXL	XL (4/5)

Vibe thought that Kurupt "destroys ... lesser lyricists ... while dipping and sliding around G-funk beats."

AllMusic wrote: "Unspectacular but solid, this was part of a late-1999 West Coast revival."

== Track listing ==
Track listing and credits adapted from liner notes.

No.	Title	Producer(s)	Length
1.	"I Call Shots" (featuring Roscoe)	Organized Noize	4:23
2.	"Loose Cannons" (featuring Daz Dillinger and Xzibit)	Daz Dillinger; Blaqthoven^{[a]}	2:23
3.	"Who Ride wit Us" (featuring Daz Dillinger)	Fredwreck	4:21
4.	"Represent Dat G.C." (featuring Butch Cassidy, Daz Dillinger, Jayo Felony, Soopafly, Snoop Dogg and Big Tray Deee)	Fredwreck	5:10
5.	"Welcome Home" (featuring LaToiya Williams)	Soopafly	4:13
6.	"Tequilla" (featuring Daz Dillinger, T-Mo and Nivea)	Organized Noize	3:45
7.	"Trylogy"	Bink!	2:15
8.	"Neva Gonna Give It Up" (featuring 213, Big Tray Deee and Soopafly)	Meech Wells	4:45
9.	"Tha Streetz Iz a Mutha" (featuring Daz Dillinger)	Daz Dillinger; Blaqthoven^{[a]}	4:08
10.	"Ya Can't Trust Nobody" (featuring Daz Dillinger)	Daz Dillinger; Blaqthoven^{[a]}; Soopafly^{[a]}	2:52
11.	"It Ain't About You" (featuring Soopafly and Tray Dee)	Soopafly	4:47
12.	"Girls All Pause" (featuring Nate Dogg and Roscoe)	Bink!	3:28
13.	"Your Gyrl Friend" (featuring Daz Dillinger)	Daz Dillinger; Blaqthoven^{[a]}	4:07
14.	"Ho's a Housewife" (featuring Dr. Dre and Hittman)	Dr. Dre	4:44
15.	"I Ain't Shit Without My Homeboyz" (featuring Baby S, Crooked I, Soopafly and Daz Dillinger)	Soopafly; Daz Dillinger^{[a]}	4:37
16.	"Step Up" (featuring Crooked I and Xzibit)	Daz Dillinger	4:53
17.	"Live on the Mic" (featuring KRS-One)	Soopafly	5:27
18.	"Calling Out Names" (featuring Xzibit)	Fredwreck	3:56
Total length:			74:20

Notes

- ^{^[a]} signifies a co-producer.
- ^{^[b]} signifies an additional producer.
- "Who Ride wit Us" features additional vocals by Bad Azz, Blaqthoven and Dimen.
- "Tequilla" features backing vocals by Nivea.
- "It Ain't About You" features additional vocals by LaToiya Williams.
- "Step Up" features scratches by DJ Battlecat.
- "Ho's a Housewife" is also featured on Dr. Dre's album, "2001".

Sample credits

- "Loose Cannons" contains samples of "Eazy-er Said Than Dunn" as performed by Eazy-E and "Quiet on tha Set" as performed by N.W.A.
- "Represent Dat G.C." contains samples of "Kool Whip" as performed by the Fatback Band.
- "Trylogy" contains samples of "Violin Concerto Movement III" as performed by Johannes Brahms.
- "Tha Streetz Iz a Mutha" contains samples of "Ike's Mood I" as performed by Isaac Hayes.
- "It Ain't About You" contains samples of "Surface (song)" as performed by Surface.
- "Girls All Pause" contains samples of "Gangster Boogie" as performed by Chicago Gangsters and "The Men All Pause" as performed by Klymaxx.
- "Step Up" contains samples of "Top Billin'" as performed by Audio Two.
- "Calling Out Names" contains samples of "Nuthin' but a 'G' Thang" as performed by Dr. Dre and "3 Card Molly" by Xzibit.

== Charts ==
=== Weekly charts ===
Chart (1999–2000)	Peak position
US Billboard 200	31
US Top R&B/Hip-Hop Albums (Billboard)	5
