= This Is the Life I Lead =

Studio album by Daz Dillinger
- Released: June 11, 2002
- Recorded: 2001–02
- Genres: West Coast hip hop; gangsta rap; underground hip hop
- Length: 58:38
- Label: D.P.G. Recordz
- Producers: Daz Dillinger (also exec.); Mike Dean

Daz Dillinger chronology
Don't Go 2 Sleep (2001)	This Is the Life I Lead (2002)	DPGC: U Know What I'm Throwin' Up (2003)

Professional ratings
Review scores
Source	Rating
AllMusic	2/5 stars
RapReviews	6.5/10

This Is the Life I Lead is the third solo studio album by American rapper and record producer Daz Dillinger. It was released on June 11, 2002 via D.P.G. Recordz. Production was handled by Mike Dean and Daz himself, who also served as executive producer. It features guest appearances from Tanya Herron, Too $hort, Mean Piece, Crystal, P.F.N., Kurupt and Roscoe. The album peaked at number 109 on the Billboard 200, number 15 on the Top R&B/Hip-Hop Albums and number 9 on the Independent Albums in the United States.

== Track listing ==
No.	Title	Writer(s)	Producer(s)	Length
1.	"Intro - D.P.G.C. 4 Life"	Delmar Arnaud	Daz Dillinger; Mike Dean	0:51
2.	"Drama"	Arnaud	Daz Dillinger	4:02
3.	"Ain't That Somethin" (featuring Crystal and P.F.N)	Arnaud; Crystal Varnado; J.J. Gizmo; Shon Brooks	Daz Dillinger; Mike Dean	4:21
4.	"Bitch Bitch Bitch Make Me Rich" (featuring Too $hort and Tanya Herron)	Arnaud; Todd Shaw; D. Williams	Daz Dillinger; Mike Dean	4:59
5.	"Keep It Gangsta" (featuring Tanya Herron)	Arnaud	Daz Dillinger; Mike Dean	4:13
6.	"I Live Every Day Like I Could Die Dat Day"	Arnaud; J. Stantz	Daz Dillinger; Mike Dean	3:58
7.	"Load Up" (featuring Tanya Herron)	Arnaud; D. Williams	Daz Dillinger; Mike Dean	3:59
8.	"Run tha Streetz"	Arnaud; C. Kelly	Daz Dillinger; Mike Dean	4:59
9.	"We Do This Passion"	Arnaud	Daz Dillinger; Mike Dean	3:16
10.	"Redrum Galour!" (featuring Mean Piece)	Arnaud; C. Kelly	Daz Dillinger; Mike Dean; Mean Piece (co.)	3:39
11.	"This Is the Life I Lead" (featuring Tanya Herron)	Arnaud	Daz Dillinger; Mike Dean	4:28
12.	"Outro - D.P.G.C. 4 Life" ("Gangsta Prerogative" (featuring Kurupt and Roscoe) + "Think About It / Where Ya Headed?" (featuring Kurupt))	Arnaud	Mike Dean	11:28
13.	"Keep It Gangsta (Remix)"			4:25
Total length:				58:38

Notes

- Track 12 consists of three separate songs: "Outro - D.P.G.C. 4 Life", "Gangsta Prerogative" featuring uncredited vocals from Kurupt and Roscoe, and "Think About It/Where Ya Headed?" featuring uncredited vocals from Kurupt, where the latter two songs are hidden tracks
- Track 13 is a hidden track

== Charts ==
Chart (2002)	Peak position
US Billboard 200	109
US Top R&B/Hip-Hop Albums (Billboard)	15
US Independent Albums (Billboard)	9
