= Gangsta Party (album) =

Studio album by Daz Dillinger
- Released: September 25, 2007
- Recorded: 2007
- Genre: West Coast hip hop
- Length: 53:37
- Label: High Powered Entertainment
- Producer: Daz Dillinger (exec.); John Silva (also exec.); Paul Silva

Daz Dillinger chronology
So So Gangsta (2006)	Gangsta Party (2007)	Only on the Left Side (2008)

Professional ratings
Review scores
Source	Rating
RapReviews	6.5/10

Gangsta Party is the ninth solo studio album by American rapper Daz Dillinger. It was released on September 25, 2007, through High Powered Entertainment. Production was handled by John Silva, who also served as executive producer together with Daz, and Paul Silva. It features guest appearances from Spice 1, E-40, Francci Richard, G-Dub, Hussein Fatal, Jagged Edge, Jayo Felony, Joe Budden, Keak da Sneak, Kurupt, Mistah F.A.B., Redman, Roscoe, San Quinn, Young Noble, Yukmouth and Erin Thompkins.

The album did not reach the Billboard 200, however it peaked at number 82 on the Top R&B/Hip-Hop Albums chart in the United States.

== Track listing ==
No.	Title	Producer(s)	Length
1.	"Intro"	John Silva	1:01
2.	"About That"	John Silva	3:51
3.	"Gangsta Shit"	John Silva	3:56
4.	"Gettin' Money" (featuring E-40 and Kurupt)	John Silva	3:49
5.	"That's Deep"	John Silva	2:30
6.	"Is This What U Want?" (featuring Redman)	John Silva	3:47
7.	"Caught Up in tha Game" (featuring Jagged Edge and Joe Budden)	John Silva	4:36
8.	"Get Ya' Pistol"	John Silva	4:05
9.	"Gangsta Party, Pt. 2" (featuring Young Noble and Hussein Fatal)	John Silva	3:26
10.	"Guns Will Blow" (featuring Yukmouth and G-Dub)	John Silva	4:02
11.	"Tell Me What U Want" (featuring Spice 1, San Quinn and Francci)	John Silva; Paul Silva	3:43
12.	"Do What the Fuck I Wanna" (featuring Jayo Felony)	John Silva	3:57
13.	"Start a Problem" (featuring Spice 1 and Roscoe)	John Silva; Paul Silva	3:45
14.	"All About da Money" (featuring Keak da Sneak and Mistah F.A.B.)	John Silva	4:29
15.	"Smoke That Weed" (featuring Erin Thompkins)	John Silva	2:40
Total length:			53:37

== Personnel ==
- Delmar "Daz Dillinger" Arnaud – vocals, executive producer
- Earl "E-40" Stevens – vocals (track 4)
- Ricardo "Kurupt" Brown – vocals (track 4)
- Roc'phella – talkbox (track 4)
- Ian De Lile – guitar (tracks: 5, 15)
- Reggie "Redman" Noble – vocals (track 6)
- Jagged Edge – vocals (track 7)
- Joe Budden – vocals (track 7)
- Rufus "Young Noble" Cooper III – vocals (track 9)
- Bruce "Hussein Fatal" Washington – vocals (track 9)
- Jerold Dwight "Yukmouth" Ellis III – vocals (track 10)
- Wiley "G-Dub" Brazier V – vocals (track 10)
- Robert Lee "Spice 1" Green Jr. – vocals (tracks: 11, 13)
- Quincy "San Quinn" Brooks – vocals (track 11)
- Francesca "Francci" Richard – vocals (track 11)
- James "Jayo Felony" Savage – vocals (track 12)
- David "Roscoe" Williams – vocals (track 13)
- Charles "Keak da Sneak" Bowens – vocals (track 14)
- Stanley "Mistah F.A.B." Cox – vocals (track 14)
- Erin Thompkins – vocals (track 15)
- John Silva – producer, executive producer
- Paul "P Shizzle" Silva – producer (tracks: 11, 13)
- A. Geiser – co-executive producer

== Charts ==
Chart (2007)	Peak position
US Top R&B/Hip-Hop Albums (Billboard)	82
