= Only on the Left Side =

Studio album by Daz Dillinger
- Released: August 12, 2008
- Genre: West Coast hip hop; gangsta rap
- Label: D.P.G. Recordz; Fontana Distribution
- Producer: Daz Dillinger (also exec.); Ivan Johnson; Lil' Ronnie; Salam Wreck; Soopafly; Swizz Beatz

Daz Dillinger chronology
| Gangsta Party (2007) | Only on the Left Side (2008) | Public Enemiez (2009) |

Singles from Only on the Left Side
- 1. "Dip Drop Stop Dip" Released: June 24, 2008

Professional ratings
Review scores
| Source | Rating |
|---|---|
| HipHopDX | 3/5 |
| RapReviews | 7.5/10 |

Only on the Left Side is the tenth solo studio album by American rapper Daz Dillinger. It was released on August 12, 2008, through D.P.G. Recordz/Fontana Distribution, while had been initially scheduled for an April or May release. Production was handled by Ivan Johnson, Soopafly, Lil' Ronnie, Salam Wreck, Swizz Beatz, and Daz himself, who also served as executive producer. It features guest appearances from Keak da Sneak, Krayzie Bone, Kurupt, Manish Man, Nicole Wray, Obie Trice, Snoop Dogg, Soopafly, Swizz Beatz, Tyrese and Big Von. The album peaked at number 38 on the Top R&B/Hip-Hop Albums, number 17 on the Top Rap Albums and number 46 on the Independent Albums charts in the United States with 2,132 copies sold in its first week. It was preceded by the only single "Dip Drop Stop Dip".

== Track listing ==
| No. | Title | Writer(s) | Producer(s) | Length |
|---|---|---|---|---|
| 1. | "Squeeze" | Delmar Arnaud | Daz Dillinger; Ivan Johnson | 4:49 |
| 2. | "I'm from the Hood" (featuring Swizz Beatz) | Arnaud; Kasseem Dean | Swizz Beatz | 3:57 |
| 3. | "Only on tha Leftside" | Arnaud | Daz Dillinger; Ivan Johnson | 4:30 |
| 4. | "My Summer Vacation" | Arnaud | Daz Dillinger; Ivan Johnson | 4:29 |
| 5. | "Meal Ticket" (featuring Krayzie Bone) | Arnaud; Anthony Henderson | Daz Dillinger; Ivan Johnson | 4:24 |
| 6. | "I'm tha Dopeman" | Arnaud | Daz Dillinger; Ivan Johnson | 5:13 |
| 7. | "Blaze Up tha Weed" | Arnaud | Daz Dillinger; Ivan Johnson | 4:06 |
| 8. | "W-Ballz 187.4" (featuring Big Von) | Arnaud | | 0:39 |
| 9. | "Dip Drop Stop Dip" (featuring Keak da Sneak) | Arnaud; Charles Bowens | Daz Dillinger; Ivan Johnson | 4:14 |
| 10. | "This Is How We Do It" (featuring Manish Man) | Arnaud | Soopafly | 5:08 |
| 11. | "Do Yo Thang" | Arnaud | Daz Dillinger; Soopafly | 4:29 |
| 12. | "Thiz Weekend" (featuring Soopafly) | Arnaud; Priest Joseph Brooks | Daz Dillinger; Soopafly | 3:50 |
| 13. | "Me & My Cuzzin" (featuring Snoop Dogg) | Arnaud; Calvin Broadus | Daz Dillinger; Ivan Johnson | 5:24 |
| 14. | "Regretz" (featuring Tyrese and Nicole Wray) | Arnaud; Tyrese Gibson; Nicole Wray | Daz Dillinger; Ivan Johnson | 4:44 |
| 15. | "Who I Be" | Arnaud | Daz Dillinger; Ivan Johnson | 4:10 |
| 16. | "My Wayz R Shady" (featuring Obie Trice) | Arnaud; Obie Trice; Salam Nassar | DJ Salam Wreck | 4:11 |
| 17. | "Thiz How We Live" (featuring Kurupt) | Arnaud; Ricardo Brown | Lil' Ronnie | 4:18 |

== Personnel ==
- Delmar "Daz Dillinger" Arnaud – main artist, producer (tracks: 1, 3–7, 9, 11–15), executive producer
- Kasseem "Swizz Beatz" Dean – featured artist & producer (track 2)
- Anthony "Krayzie Bone" Henderson – featured artist (track 5)
- "Big Von" Johnson – featured artist (track 8)
- Charles "Keak da Sneak" Williams – featured artist (track 9)
- Albert Lee "Manish Man" Harris – featured artist (track 10)
- Priest "Soopafly" Brooks – featured artist (track 12), producer (tracks: 10–12)
- Calvin "Snoop Dogg" Broadus – featured artist (track 13)
- Tyrese Gibson – featured artist (track 14)
- Nicole Wray – featured artist (track 14)
- Obie Trice – featured artist (track 16)
- Ricardo "Kurupt" Brown – featured artist (track 17)
- Ivan L. Johnson – producer (tracks: 1, 3–7, 9, 13–15)
- Salam Nassar – producer (track 16)
- "Lil' Ronnie" Jackson – producer (track 17)
- Young Breezy – cover design
- Arnold "Bigg A" White – marketing & promotion

== Charts ==
| Chart (2008) | Peak position |
|---|---|
| US Top R&B/Hip-Hop Albums (Billboard) | 38 |
| US Top Rap Albums (Billboard) | 17 |
| US Independent Albums (Billboard) | 46 |
