= Retaliation, Revenge and Get Back =

Studio album by Daz Dillinger
- Released: March 31, 1998
- Studios: The Gang Hideout (Long Beach, California); Echo Sound (Atwater Village, Los Angeles); Larabee Sound (West Hollywood, California); Track Record (North Hollywood, Los Angeles); The Village Recorder (Los Angeles); Can-Am Studios (Tarzana, Los Angeles)
- Genres: West Coast hip-hop; gangsta rap; G-funk
- Length: 74:49
- Labels: Death Row; Priority
- Producers: Suge Knight (exec.); Daz Dillinger; Ran Dogg; Soopafly

Daz Dillinger chronology
Retaliation, Revenge and Get Back (1998)	R.A.W. (2000)

Singles from Retaliation, Revenge and Get Back
- 1. "It Might Sound Crazy" Released: 1998; 2. "In California" Released: 1998

Professional ratings
Review scores
Source	Rating
AllMusic	3/5 stars
The Source	4/5 stars
USA Today	3/4 stars

Retaliation, Revenge and Get Back is the debut studio album by American rapper Daz Dillinger, released on March 31, 1998, through Death Row Records and Priority Records. The promotional singles released from the album were "In California" and "It Might Sound Crazy", which had music videos, including an animated one.

A sequel, Retaliation, Revenge and Get Back 2, was released on June 15, 2025.

A third installment, Retaliation, Revenge and Get Back 3, was released on September 11, 2025.

== Background ==
By 1998, Daz Dillinger was one of the last remaining artists on Death Row after its decline in 1996 after the death of 2Pac, and the departure of Dr. Dre. Daz was the head of Death Row while Suge Knight was imprisoned for violating his parole, caused by a fight he, 2Pac, and fellow Death Row members got into with Orlando Anderson in Las Vegas on Sept 7th. The album peaked at number 8 on the Billboard 200 on April 18 with 89,000 copies sold in its first week. Daz soon left after this album to form his own record company, D.P.G. Recordz and worked with such artists as Soopafly, Mac Shawn, Crooked I, South Sentrell, and others.

The album was also the last original Death Row album for seven years. Since Daz was one of the last of a dying breed, he largely moved on to different techniques after this album.

The album's cover artwork references the cover of Marvin Gaye's album In Our Lifetime.

== Track listing ==
No.	Title	Length
1.	"Gang Bangin' Ass Criminal" (featuring Kurupt, Soopafly, Tray Deee, Ty Cuzz, Bad Azz and Techniec)	6:49
2.	"It's Going Down" (featuring Kurupt and Prince Ital Joe)	4:46
3.	"Playa Partners" (featuring B-Legit and Bo-Roc)	4:45
4.	"It Might Sound Crazy" (featuring Too Short)	5:04
5.	"Our Daily Bread" (featuring Kurupt and Prince Ital Joe)	3:50
6.	"In California" (featuring Val Young)	5:06
7.	"Initiated" (featuring 2Pac, Kurupt and Outlawz)	4:53
8.	"Oh No" (featuring Tray Deee and J-Money)	4:51
9.	"Retaliation, Revenge and Get Back"	4:39
10.	"O.G." (featuring Snoop Dogg and Nate Dogg)	4:37
11.	"Baby Mama Drama" (featuring Big C-Style and Lil' C-Style)	4:49
12.	"Only for U" (featuring Big Pimpin' Delemond and Val Young)	5:47
13.	"Ridin' High" (featuring WC)	4:43
14.	"The Ultimate Come Up" (featuring MC Eiht and Bad Azz)	4:42
15.	"Thank God for My Life" (featuring Bad Azz, Tray Deee, Soopafly and Big Pimpin' Delemond)	3:07
16.	"Why Do We Bang" (outro)	2:21
Total length:		74:49

LP and cassette bonus track
No.	Title	Length
17.	"Pimp City" (featuring Soopafly)	5:10
Total length:		79:59

Notes

- "Pimp City" can also be found on Soopafly's Dat Whoopty Woop

Sample credits

- "It's Going Down" contains a sample from "Mos***up" performed by Just-Ice
- "Our Daily Bread" contains a sample from "Do What I Feel" performed by Tha Dogg Pound featuring The Lady of Rage
- "In California" contains a sample from "Beware of My Crew" performed by LBC Crew

== Charts ==
=== Weekly charts ===
Chart (1998)	Peak position
US Billboard 200	8
US Top R&B/Hip-Hop Albums (Billboard)	2

=== Year-end charts ===
Chart (1998)	Position
US Top R&B/Hip-Hop Albums (Billboard)	91
