= R.A.W. (album) =

Studio album by Daz Dillinger
- Released: August 29, 2000
- Genre: West Coast hip hop
- Length: 1:13:58
- Label: D.P.G.
- Producer: Daz Dillinger

Daz Dillinger chronology
Retaliation, Revenge and Get Back (1998)	R.A.W. (2000)	Don't Go 2 Sleep (2001)

Professional ratings
Review scores
Source	Rating
AllMusic	2.5/5 stars

R.A.W. is the second solo studio album by American rapper and record producer Daz Dillinger. It was released on August 29, 2000, through D.P.G. Recordz, making it his first album to be released under the label. It features guest appearances from Kurupt, Big Tray Deee, Big Pimpin Delemond, LaToiya Williams, Lil' C-Style, Mac Shawn, Mark Morrison, Slip Capone, Soopafly, and tha Mactress.

The album did not reach the Billboard 200, however it peaked at number 87 on the Top R&B/Hip-Hop Albums and number 38 on the Independent Albums charts in the United States.

== Background ==
It was originally meant to be a Death Row Records release, but Daz took away the reels from Suge Knight, who was in jail at the time. After his return from prison, he got the reels back and put some of the songs from the album on Tha Dogg Pound compilation 2002, as well as "Baccstabbers" being on Mark Morrison's second studio album Innocent Man, a then-unreleased album by Death Row Records. "Just a Man"/"Backstabbers" peaked at number 48 on the UK Singles Chart.

== Track listing ==
No.	Title	Writer(s)	Producer(s)	Length
1.	"Super Cuz" (Skit)			0:20
2.	"Street Gangs"		Daz Dillinger	1:57
3.	"What Cha Talkin Bout"	Delmar Arnaud; Jamarr Stamps	Daz Dillinger	4:17
4.	"This Iz Not Over "Till We Say So""	Arnaud	Daz Dillinger	3:39
5.	"One-Nine-99" (featuring Lil' C-Style and Big Pimpin' Delemond)	Arnaud; Ronald Gillion; Dwight Williams	Daz Dillinger	3:46
6.	"Who's Knocc'n at My Door" (featuring Big Pimpin' Delemond)	Arnaud; D. Williams	Daz Dillinger	4:23
7.	"When Ya Lease Exspected"	Arnaud	Daz Dillinger	4:12
8.	"What Iz It"	Arnaud	Daz Dillinger	5:06
9.	"I'd Rather Lie 2 Ya" (featuring Kurupt and Tray Deee)	Arnaud; Ricardo Brown; Stamps	Daz Dillinger	3:56
10.	"On tha Grind" (featuring Kurupt)	Arnaud; Brown	Daz Dillinger; E3 (co.)	3:38
11.	"If You Want This Pussy" (Interlude)		Daz Dillinger	0:41
12.	"Your Gyrlfriend 2" (featuring Mac Shawn and Soopafly)	Arnaud; DeShawn Dawson; Priest Brooks	Daz Dillinger	3:59
13.	"R.A.W." (featuring Kurupt)	Arnaud; Brown	Daz Dillinger	4:12
14.	"It'z All About That Money"	Arnaud	Daz Dillinger	4:00
15.	"Movin' Around" (featuring Slip Capone)	Arnaud; Christen Kelley	Daz Dillinger	4:01
16.	"U Ain't Know'n" (featuring Tray Deee)	Arnaud; Tracy Davis	Daz Dillinger	3:59
17.	"Agony" (featuring LaToiya Williams)	Arnaud; LaToiya Williams; Brooks	Daz Dillinger; Soopafly	3:57
18.	"Feels Good" (featuring Kurupt and LaToiya Williams)	Arnaud; Brown; L. Williams	Daz Dillinger	5:03
19.	"My System" (featuring Kurupt and tha Mactress)	Arnaud; Brown; A. Watkins	Daz Dillinger	4:02
20.	"Baccstabber" (featuring Mark Morrison and Tray Deee)		Daz Dillinger	4:21
21.	"Super Cuz" (Skit)			0:29
Total length:				1:13:58

== Charts ==
Chart (2000)	Peak position
US Top R&B/Hip-Hop Albums (Billboard)	87
US Independent Albums (Billboard)	38
