= Game for Sale =

Studio album by Daz Dillinger & JT the Bigga Figga
- Released: March 6, 2001
- Genre: West Coast hip hop; gangsta rap
- Length: 1:02:51
- Label: Get Low Recordz
- Producer: Daz Dillinger (exec.); JT the Bigga Figga (exec.); Sean T

Daz Dillinger & JT the Bigga Figga chronology
Long Beach 2 Fillmoe (2001)	Game for Sale (2001)

Professional ratings
Review scores
Source	Rating
Encyclopedia of Popular Music	2/5 stars
XXL	XL (4/5)

Game for Sale is the second collaborative album by American rappers Daz Dillinger and JT the Bigga Figga. It was released on March 6, 2001, via Get Low Recordz.

== Track listing ==
No.	Title	Length
1.	"Independent Bubble" (featuring San Quinn & E-40)	3:01
2.	"I'm a Boss" (featuring C-Bo, Yukmouth & Dru Down)	3:58
3.	"They Know"	3:59
4.	"Makin' Moves" (featuring San Quinn, Sean T & Milo)	4:38
5.	"Balled Out"	3:14
6.	"What We Came Fo'" (featuring Guce & Tha Gamblaz)	3:34
7.	"Game 4 Sale" (featuring Mac Mall, Yukmouth & Sean T)	4:44
8.	"I Ain't Tryin' to Hear It"	4:00
9.	"Southern Expozure" (featuring San Quinn & Mississippi)	2:30
10.	"Lovin' It" (featuring Troopa & Tha Gamblaz)	4:14
11.	"Sweet Love" (featuring Kurupt & Rappin' 4-Tay)	4:48
12.	"Geez to Get" (featuring Killa Tay, Cozmo & Tha Gamblaz)	4:15
13.	"Who Got My Back" (featuring Tha Gamblaz)	4:13
14.	"Snitchaz"	4:45
15.	"I Ain't for Play" (featuring Cozmo & Tha Gamblaz)	3:58
16.	"What We Came Fo' (Remix)"	3:00
Total length:		1:02:51

== Charts ==
Chart (2001)	Peak position
US Top R&B/Hip-Hop Albums (Billboard)	80
US Independent Albums (Billboard)	37
