= D.P.G. Recordz =

Record label

- Founded: 1999
- Founder: Daz Dillinger, Soopafly
- Status: Active
- Distributor(s): RED Distribution
- Genre: West Coast hip hop, Gangsta rap
- Country of origin: United States
- Location: Long Beach, California
- Official website: D.P.G. Recordz.com

D.P.G. Recordz (short for Dogg Pound Gangstaz Recordz) is a record label founded by Daz Dillinger and Soopafly after he and Kurupt left Death Row Records.

== Discography ==
- Daz Dillinger - R.A.W (2000)
- Daz Dillinger - Long Beach 2 Fillmoe (with JT the Bigga Figga) (2001)
- Daz Dillinger - Game for Sale (with JT the Bigga Figga) (2001)
- D.P.G - Dillinger & Young Gotti (2001)
- Soopafly - Dat Whoopty Woop (2001)
- Who Ride wit Us: Tha Compalation, Vol. 1 (2001)
- Makaveli & Dillinger Don't Go 2 Sleep (2001)
- Daz Dillinger - This Is The Life I Lead (2002)
- To Live and Die in CA (2002)
- Who Ride wit Us: Tha Compalation, Vol. 2 (2002)
- Kurupt - Same Day, Different Shit (2006)
- Daz Dillinger - Only on the Left Side (2008)
- Daz Dillinger - Public Enemiez (2009)
- Daz Dillinger - Witit Witit (2012)
- Daz Dillinger - Weed Money (2014)

== See also ==
- List of record labels
