= Nate Dogg discography =

- Studio albums: 3
- Compilation albums: 1
- Music videos: 41
- Collaborative albums: 1
- Singles as lead artist: 19
- Singles as featured artist: 41
- Promotional singles: 29
- Guest Appearances: 100+

The discography of American recording artist Nate Dogg consists of three studio albums, one compilation album, one collaboration album, sixty singles (including forty-three as a featured artist) and forty-one music videos.

== Albums ==
=== Studio albums ===
List of albums, with selected chart positions
Title	Album details	Peak chart positions	
Title	Album details	US	US R&B
G-Funk Classics, Vol. 1	Released: January 14, 1997; Label: Death Row; Format: CD	—	—
G-Funk Classics, Vol. 1 & 2	Released: July 21, 1998; Label: Breakaway; Format: CD, LP, cassette, digital download	58	20
Music & Me	Released: December 4, 2001; Label: Elektra; Format: CD, LP, cassette, digital download	32	3
Nate Dogg	Released: February 25, 2003; Label: Elektra; Format: digital download	—	—

=== Collaborative albums ===
List of collaborative albums, with selected chart positions, sales figures and certifications
Title	Album details	Peak chart positions											Sales	Certifications (sales threshold)
Title	Album details	US	US Ind	US R&B/HH	AUS	BEL	CAN	DUT	GER	NZ	SWI	UK R&B	Sales	Certifications (sales threshold)
The Hard Way (with 213)	Released: August 17, 2004; Genre: West Coast hip hop, Gangsta rap, G-funk, R&B; Label: TVT, Doggystyle; Format: CD, LP, cassette, digital download	4	1	1	50	57	3	57	34	21	33	35	WW: 1,000,000; US: 500,000	MC: Gold

=== Compilation albums ===
- Essentials (2002)

== Singles ==
=== As lead artist ===
List of singles as lead artist, with other performing artists, selected chart positions and certifications, showing year released and album name
Title	Year	Peak chart positions										Certifications	Album
Title	Year	US	US R&B	US Rap	AUS	FRA	GER	NLD	NZ	SWI	UK	Certifications	Album
"Indo Smoke" (with Mista Grimm and Warren G)	1993	56	63	12	—	—	—	—	—	—	—		Poetic Justice soundtrack
"Regulate" (with Warren G)	1994	2	7	1	16	7	7	5	5	5	5	ARIA: Gold; BPI: 2× Platinum; BVMI: Gold; RIAA: 2× Platinum; RMNZ: 5× Platinum	Above the Rim soundtrack and Regulate...G Funk Era
"One More Day"	1995	—	106	—	—	—	—	—	—	—	—		Murder Was the Case
"Beware of My Crew" (with LBC Crew, Roger Troutman, Tray Deee and South Sentrell)	1995	75	51	8	—	—	—	—	—	—	—		A Thin Line Between Love and Hate soundtrack
"Never Leave Me Alone" (featuring Snoop Doggy Dogg)	1996	33	22	—	—	—	—	—	2	—	—		G-Funk Classics, Vol. 1 & 2
"These Days" (with Dat Nigga Daz)	1997	—	—	—	—	—	—	—	—	—	—		Gang Related soundtrack and G-Funk Classics, Vol. 1 & 2
"Nobody Does It Better" (with Warren G)	1998	18	18	—	—	—	71	—	—	—	—		Woo soundtrack and G-Funk Classics, Vol. 1 & 2
"Where I Wanna Be" (with Shade Sheist and Kurupt)	2000	95	49	2	—	—	—	—	—	—	14		Damizza Presents Where I Wanna Be and Informal Introduction
"Oh No" (with Mos Def and Pharoahe Monch)	2000	83	22	1	—	—	—	—	—	—	24		Lyricist Lounge 2
"Behind the Walls" (with Kurupt)	2001	—	52	—	—	—	—	—	—	—	—		Oz soundtrack
"The Good Life" (with Nas and JS)	2001	—	—	—	—	—	—	—	—	—	—		The Good Life
"Area Codes" (with Ludacris and Jazze Pha)	2001	24	10	7	97	43	—	—	40	—	25	RIAA: Gold; RMNZ: Platinum	Rush Hour 2 soundtrack and Word of Mouf
"I Got Love"	2001	118	45	—	—	—	—	—	—	—	—	RMNZ: Platinum	Music & Me
"Get Up" (featuring Eve)	2002	—	81	—	—	—	—	—	—	—	—		Nate Dogg
"One Night Stand" (featuring Simon Vegas, Angie Martinez and Illo 77)	2003	—	—	—	—	—	83	—	—	—	—		Music & Me
"What Would You Do" (with Mariah Carey and Shade Sheist)	2003	—	57	—	—	—	—	—	—	—	—		Non-album single
"Forever in Our Hearts" (with Brian McKnight, Mya, Sonny Sandoval, Jacoby Shaddix, FeFe Dobson, Pete Loeffler, Ben Jelen & Ben Moody)	2005	—	—	—	—	—	—	—	—	—	—		Non-album single
"Real Soon" (with Tha Dogg Pound and Snoop Dogg as DPGC)	2005	—	103	—	49	—	—	—	—	—	—		Welcome to tha Chuuuch: Da Album
"Have a Party" (with 50 Cent and Mobb Deep)	2006	105	49	23	—	—	—	—	—	—	—		Get Rich or Die Tryin soundtrack and Blood Money
"—" denotes a recording that did not chart or was not released in that territory.

=== As featured artist ===
List of singles as featured artist, with other performing artists, selected chart positions and certifications, showing year released and album name
Title	Year	Peak chart positions										Certifications	Album
Title	Year	US	US R&B	US Rap	AUS	FRA	GER	NLD	NZ	SWI	UK	Certifications	Album
"Let's Play House" (Tha Dogg Pound featuring Michel'le, Nate Dogg and Big Pimpin' Delemond)	1995	45	21	5	—	—	—	—	—	—	—		Dogg Food
"Girls All Pause" (Kurupt featuring Nate Dogg and Roscoe)	1999	—	62	—	—	—	—	—	—	—	—		Tha Streetz Iz a Mutha
"Ghetto" (Tha Eastsidaz featuring Kokane, Nate Dogg and Kam)	2000	—	—	—	—	—	—	—	—	—	—		Tha Eastsidaz
"The Next Episode" (Dr. Dre featuring Snoop Dogg, Kurupt and Nate Dogg)	2000	23	11	9	—	22	34	26	—	34	3	BPI: 2× Platinum; BVMI: Gold; RMNZ: 4× Platinum	2001
"Lay Low" (Snoop Dogg featuring Master P, Nate Dogg, Butch Cassidy, Goldie Loc and Tray Deee)	2001	50	20	8	—	81	49	33	—	48	—		Tha Last Meal
"High Come Down" (Chico & Coolwadda featuring Nate Dogg)	2001	—	81	—	—	—	—	—	—	—	—		Wild 'n tha West
"Been a Long Time" (Xzibit featuring Nate Dogg)	2001	—	—	—	—	—	—	—	—	—	—		Resteless
"Bitch Please II" (Eminem featuring Dr. Dre, Nate Dogg, Snoop Dogg and Xzibit)	2001	—	61	—	—	—	—	—	—	—	—	ARIA: Platinum; RIAA: Gold; RMNZ: Platinum	The Marshall Mathers LP
"Can't Deny It" (Fabolous featuring Nate Dogg)	2001	25	13	11	—	—	—	—	—	—	—		Ghetto Fabolous
"Ballin' Out of Control" (Jermaine Dupri featuring Nate Dogg)	2001	95	42	14	—	—	—	—	—	—	—		Instructions
"Whatever" (Jermaine Dupri featuring Skeeter Rock, Katrina, Tigah, R.O.C., Trey Lorenz and Nate Dogg )	2001	—	—	—	—	—	—	—	—	—	—		Instructions
"Multiply" (Xzibit featuring Nate Dogg)	2002	114	40	23	31	—	33	76	—	33	39		Man vs. Machine
"The Streets" (WC featuring Snoop Dogg and Nate Dogg)	2002	81	43	20	—	—	—	—	—	—	48		Ghetto Heisman
"21 Questions" (50 Cent featuring Nate Dogg)	2003	1	1	1	4	58	35	7	8	14	6	ARIA: Platinum; BPI: 2× Platinum; BVMI: Gold; RIAA: 4× Platinum; RMNZ: 4× Platinum	Get Rich or Die Tryin'
"If It Wasn't 4 U" (Rappin' 4-Tay featuring Suga Free and Nate Dogg)	2003	—	—	—	—	—	—	—	—	—	—		Gangsta Gumbo
"Need Me in Your Life" (Memphis Bleek featuring Nate Dogg)	2003	—	—	—	—	—	—	—	—	—	—		M.A.D.E.
"Gangsta Nation" (Westside Connection featuring Nate Dogg)	2003	33	22	9	66	66	89	—	—	—	—	RMNZ: Platinum	Terrorist Threats
"Ooh Wee" (Mark Ronson featuring Ghostface Killah, Nate Dogg, Trife and Saigon)	2003	—	80	—	83	—	95	82	—	—	15	BPI: Silver	Here Comes the Fuzz
"I Don't Wanna Know" (Hi-C featuring Nate Dogg)	2003	—	—	—	—	—	—	—	—	—	—		The Hi-Life Hustle
"The Set Up" (Obie Trice featuring Nate Dogg)	2004	73	39	19	—	—	—	—	—	53	32		Cheers
"Time's Up" (Jadakiss featuring Nate Dogg)	2004	70	26	19	—	—	—	—	—	—	—		Kiss of Death
"I Like That" (Houston featuring Chingy, Nate Dogg and I-20)	2004	11	14	6	12	29	18	17	4	5	11	RIAA: Gold; ARIA: Gold	It's Already Written
"I Like It" (Mr. Capone-E featuring Nate Dogg)	2004	—	—	—	—	—	—	—	—	—	—		Always and Forever
"Thugs Get Lonely Too" (2Pac featuring Nate Dogg)	2004	98	55	—	—	—	—	—	—	—	—		Loyal to the Game
"Black Mercedes" (DJ Quik featuring Nate Dogg)	2005	—	—	—	—	—	—	—	—	—	—		Trauma
"Gangsta Party" (Joe Budden featuring Nate Dogg)	2005	—	94	—	—	—	—	—	—	—	—		Non-album single
"Where I'm From" (The Game featuring Nate Dogg)	2005	—	—	—	—	—	—	—	—	—	—		The Documentary
"Hush is Coming" (Hush featuring Nate Dogg)	2005	—	—	—	—	—	—	—	—	—	—		Bulletproof
"Like This" (Mack 10 featuring Nate Dogg)	2005	—	—	—	—	—	—	—	—	—	—		Hustla's Handbook
"I Need a Light" (Warren G featuring Nate Dogg)	2005	—	—	—	—	—	—	—	—	—	—		In the Mid-Nite Hour
"In the Mid-Nite Hour" (Warren G featuring Nate Dogg)	2005	—	—	—	—	—	—	—	—	—	—		In the Mid-Nite Hour
"Shake That" (Eminem featuring Nate Dogg)	2006	6	—	11	—	—	—	—	—	—	90	ARIA: 7× Platinum; BVMI: Gold; BPI: Platinum; RIAA: 4× Platinum; IFPI SWE: Gold; RMNZ: 4× Platinum	Curtain Call: The Hits
"Came 2 Me in a Dream" (Mr. Capone-E featuring Nate Dogg)	2006	—	—	—	—	—	—	—	—	—	—		A Soldier's Story
"Crazy" (Snoop Dogg featuring Nate Dogg)	2006	—	—	—	—	—	—	—	—	—	—		Tha Blue Carpet Treatment
"Boss' Life" (Snoop Dogg featuring Nate Dogg)	2007	—	65	—	—	—	—	—	—	—	—		Tha Blue Carpet Treatment
"I'm Coming Home to You" (Down AKA Kilo featuring Nate Dogg and Fingazz)	2007	—	—	—	—	—	—	—	—	—	—		Definition of an Ese
"Do Me" (Play-N-Skillz featuring Nate Dogg)	2007	—	—	—	—	—	—	—	—	—	—		Non-album single
"Merry Jane" (Redman featuring Nate Dogg and Snoop Dogg)	2007	—	—	—	—	—	—	—	—	—	—		Red Gone Wild
"Should of Been Mine" (Mister D featuring Nate Dogg and Sleepy Malo)	2008	—	—	—	—	—	—	—	—	—	—		Year of the Gangster
"Party We Will Throw Now!" (Warren G featuring Nate Dogg and Game)	2012	—	—	—	—	—	—	—	—	—	—	RMNZ: Platinum	Non-album single
"My House" (Warren G featuring Nate Dogg)	2015	—	—	—	—	—	—	—	—	—	—		Regulate...G Funk Era PT II
"—" denotes a recording that did not chart or was not released in that territory.

=== Promotional singles ===
List of promotional singles as lead and featured artist, with other performing artists, selected chart positions and certifications, showing year released and album name
Title	Year	Peak chart positions						Certifications	Album
Title	Year	US	US R&B	AUS	GER	SWI	UK	Certifications	Album
"How Long Will They Mourn Me?" (Thug Life featuring Nate Dogg)	1995	—	—	—	—	—	—		Thug Life, Volume I
"Santa Claus Goes Straight to the Ghetto" (with Bad Azz, Dat Nigga Daz, Snoop Doggy Dogg and Tray Deee)	1996	—	—	—	—	—	—		Christmas on Death Row
"I Don't Wanna Hurt No More"	1998	—	—	—	—	—	—		G-Funk Classics, Vol. 1 & 2
"Medley for a 'V' (The Pussy Medley)" (DJ Quik featuring Snoop Dogg, Nate Dogg, Hi-C, AMG, 2nd II None and El DeBarge)	1998	—	—	—	—	—	—		Rhythm-al-ism
"Bitch Please" (Snoop Dogg featuring Xzibit and Nate Dogg)	1999	77	26	—	—	48	—		No Limit Top Dogg
"Game Don't Wait (Remix)" (Warren G featuring Nate Dogg, Snoop Dogg and Xzibit)	1999	—	58	—	—	—	—		I Want It All
"Havin' Things" (Warren G featuring Jermaine Dupri and Nate Dogg)	2000	—	—	—	—	—	—		I Want It All
"Nah, Nah..." (E-40 featuring Nate Dogg)	2000	—	61	—	—	—	—		Loyalty and Betrayal
"Big Pimpin'" (Charlie Wilson featuring Snoop Dogg and Nate Dogg)	2000	—	—	—	—	—	—		Bridging the Gap
"4 Much'" (Ras Kass featuring Lil' J, Bad Azz, Nate Dogg and Tash)	2000	—	—	—	—	—	—		Non-album singles
"Connected" (Shaquille O'Neal featuring WC and Nate Dogg)	2001	—	104	—	—	—	—		Non-album singles
"Keep It G.A.N.G.S.T.A. (Remix)" (featuring Missy Elliott)	2001	—	—	—	—	—	—	RMNZ: Gold	Non-album singles
"Your Woman Has Just Been Sighted (Ring the Alarm)" (featuring Jermaine Dupri)	2002	—	—	—	—	—	—	RMNZ: Gold	Music & Me
"'Till I Collapse" (Eminem featuring Nate Dogg)	2002	—	—	92	99	—	73	ARIA: 9× Platinum; BPI: 3× Platinum; BVMI: 3× Gold; RIAA: 8× Platinum; RMNZ: 6× Platinum	The Eminem Show
"Walk like a G" (Rock featuring Nate Dogg)	2002	—	—	—	—	—	—		Non-album single
"Str8 Westcoast (Remix)" (Knoc-turn'al featuring Xzibit, Warren G, Nate Dogg and Shade Sheist)	2002	—	—	—	—	—	—		L.A. Confidential presents: Knoc-turn'al
"Wake Up" (Shade Sheist featuring Nate Dogg and Warren G)	2002	—	53	—	—	—	—		Informal Introduction
"I Need a Bitch" (featuring Rob Stricklong)	2002	—	—	—	—	—	—		Nate Dogg
"Big Dick Shit (Concrete Jungle)" (The D.O.C. featuring Nate Dogg, 6Two, U.P.-T.I.G.H.T. and Jazze Pha)	2003	—	—	—	—	—	—		Deuce
"What They Think" (DJ Quik featuring Nate Dogg)	2003	—	—	—	—	—	—		Non-album single
"Lollipop" (Snoop Dogg featuring Soopafly, Jay-Z and Nate Dogg)	2003	—	—	—	—	—	—		Paid tha Cost to Be da Boss
"Him or Me" (Knoc-turn'al featuring Nate Dogg)	2004	—	—	—	—	—	—		The Way I Am
"Warrior Pt. 2" (Lloyd Banks featuring Eminem, Nate Dogg and 50 Cent)	2004	—	—	—	—	—	—		The Hunger for More
"Boyz n tha Hood" (Daz Dillinger featuring Nate Dogg)	2004	—	62	—	—	—	—		Non-album single
"Running Your Mouth" (The Notorious B.I.G. featuring Fabolous, Nate Dogg, Busta Rhymes, Foxy Brown and Snoop Dogg)	2005	—	—	—	—	—	—		Greatest Hits
"Hard on a Hoe" (Tha Dogg Pound featuring RBX, Snoop Dogg and Nate Dogg)	2006	—	—	—	—	—	—		Cali Iz Active
"Golden State" (Mic Little featuring Nate Dogg)	2006	—	—	—	—	—	—		Non-album single
"Mami Mira" (Mr. Criminal featuring Nate Dogg and Mr. Capone-E)	2007	—	—	—	—	—	—		Ryder Muzik
"It's fo' Twenty" (Bishop Brigante featuring Nate Dogg)	2007	—	—	—	—	—	—		Non-album single
"—" denotes a recording that did not chart or was not released in that territory.

== Other charted and certified songs ==
List of non-single other charted songs as lead and featured artist, with other performing artists, selected chart positions and certifications, showing year released and album name
Title	Year	Peak chart positions				Certifications	Album
Title	Year	US R&B	FRA	GER	SWI	Certifications	Album
"Ain't No Fun (If the Homies Can't Have None)" (Snoop Doggy Dogg featuring DJ Eazy Dick, Nate Dogg, Kurupt and Warren G)	1993	—	—	—	—	RMNZ: Platinum	Doggystyle
"All About U" (2Pac featuring Dru Down, Nate Dogg, Hussein Fatal, Yaki Kadafi and Snoop Doggy Dogg)	1996	—	—	—	—	RMNZ: Platinum	All Eyez on Me
"Xxplosive" (Dr. Dre featuring Hittman, Kurupt, Nate Dogg and Six-Two)	1999	51	—	—	—	RMNZ: 2× Platinum; BPI: Silver	2001
"Backdoor"	2001	—	—	—	—	RMNZ: Gold	Music & Me
"Concrete Streets"	2001	—	—	—	—	RMNZ: Gold	Music & Me
"Music & Me"	2001	—	—	—	—	RMNZ: 2× Platinum	Music & Me
"My Name" (Xzibit featuring Eminem and Nate Dogg)	2002	66	—	—	—	RMNZ: Gold	Man vs. Machine
"Never Enough" (Eminem featuring Nate Dogg and 50 Cent)	2004	—	—	—	—	ARIA: Platinum; RMNZ: Gold	Encore
"Keep on Hustlin'" (Warren G featuring Nate Dogg, Jeezy and Bun B)	2015	—	119	—	—		Regulate... G Funk Era, Part II
"How Come" (Shindy featuring Nate Dogg)	2023	—	—	40	52		In meiner Blüte
"—" denotes a recording that did not chart.

== Guest appearances ==
List of non-single guest appearances, with other performing artists, showing year released and album name
Title	Year	Other artist(s)	Album
"Deeez Nuuuts"	1992	Dr. Dre, Dat Nigga Daz, Warren G, Snoop Doggy Dogg	The Chronic
"Every Single Day"	1993	Snoop Doggy Dogg, Kurupt	None
"Big Pimpin'"	1994	Dat Nigga Daz, Big Pimpin' Delemond, Snoop Doggy Dogg	Above the Rim soundtrack
"St. Ides in the LBC"	1994	Snoop Doggy Dogg	St. Ides '94
"Drank Anthem"	1994	None	St. Ides '94
"I Don't Like to Dream About Gettin Paid"	1995	Tha Dogg Pound	Dogg Food
"A Doggz Day Afternoon"	1995	Tha Dogg Pound, Snoop Doggy Dogg	Dogg Food
"Feels Good to Be DPG"	1996	Lil' C-Style, Tray Deee, DJ Pooh, Fuski, Snoop Doggy Dogg	Haven't You Heard
"Skandalouz"	1996	2Pac	All Eyez on Me
"Just Doggin'"	1996	Tha Dogg Pound	Sunset Park soundtrack
"Changed Man"	1996	2Pac, Big Syke	None
"Groupie"	1996	Snoop Doggy Dogg, Charlie Wilson, Tha Dogg Pound, Warren G	Tha Doggfather
"Be Thankful"	1996	Butch Cassidy	Christmas on Death Row
"Why"	1997	None	Gridlock'd soundtrack
"Annie Mae"	1997	Warren G	Take a Look Over Your Shoulder
"O.G.	1998	Daz Dillinger, Snoop Doggy Dogg	Retaliation, Revenge and Get Back
"We Came to Rock Ya Body"	1998	The Click, Tha Dogg Pound, Snoop Dogg	Boss Ballin', Vol. 2: The Mob Bosses
"Victims of Reality"	1998	Dresta	Straight Outta Cali
"Ghetto Millionaire"	1999	C-Murder, Kurupt, Snoop Dogg	Bossalinie
"Don't Tell"	1999	Snoop Dogg, Warren G, Mausberg	No Limit Top Dogg
"Gangsta Love"	1999	Warren G, RBX, Kurupt	I Want It All
"Neva Gonna Give It Up"	1999	Kurupt, Tray Deee, Soopafly, Snoop Dogg, Warren G	Tha Streetz Iz a Mutha
"Teardrops and Closed Caskets"	1999	Outlawz, 2Pac, Val Young	Still I Rise
Sorry We Keep Ya"	2000	The Dove Shack	Reality Has Got Me Tied Up
"No More Games"	2000	Prince Ital Joe, Snoop Dogg	Thug Lifestyles
"Dip"	2000	Da 5 Footaz	None
"Sinister Mob"	2000	E-40	Loyalty and Betrayal
"Curious"	2000	Doggy's Angels, Snoop Dogg	Pleezbaleevit!
"Set It Off"	2000	Snoop Dogg, MC Ren, Ice Cube, Lady of Rage, Kurupt	Tha Last Meal
"So Ignorant"	2001	Yukmouth, Kokane, Kurupt	Thug Lord: The New Testament
"Reflexions"	2001	K-Mel	Reflexions, Vol.1
"The Game"	2001	Black Rob	Ghetto Pros Presents...
"Breakin' My Ballz"	2001	Kurupt, Roscoe	None
"Mary Jane"	2001	Kurupt	None
"Cali Diseaz"	2001	Shade Sheist	The Fast and the Furious soundtrack / Informal Introduction
"Money, Sex & Thugs"	2001	D-Shot, Butch Cassidy, E-40	Money-Sex & Thugs
"Space Boogie"	2001	Kurupt	Space Boogie: Smoke Oddessey
"The Hardest..."	2001	Kurupt, MC Ren, Xzibit	Space Boogie: Smoke Oddessey
"Lay It on Back"	2001	Kurupt, Fred Durst, DJ Lethal	Space Boogie: Smoke Oddessey
"Eastside Ridaz"	2001	Tha Eastsidaz, Soopafly	Duces 'n Trayz: The Old Fashioned Way
"Welcome 2 tha House"	2001	Tha Eastsidaz, Doggy's Angels	Duces 'n Trayz: The Old Fashioned Way
"Cool"	2001	Tray Deee, Goldie Loc, Butch Cassidy, Kokane	Duces 'n Trayz: The Old Fashioned Way
"Paper Trippin'"	2001	WC	Rush Hour 2 soundtrack
"Kiss Is Spittin'"	2001	Jadakiss, Mashonda	Kiss tha Game Goodbye
"Let's Get It Crackin"	2001	Steady Mobb'n	Crime Buddies
"Don't Hate"	2001	Tray Deee, Bad Azz, R.G.	Heated
"Don't Know Where to Start"	2001	Brian McKnight	Superhero
"If We"	2001	Mariah Carey, Ja Rule	Glitter soundtrack
"Gangsta wit It"	2001	Snoop Dogg, Butch Cassidy	Bones soundtrack
"Eastside Party"	2001	Snoop Dogg	Death Row's Snoop Doggy Dogg Greatest Hits
"Here Comes Another Hit"	2001	Warren G, Mista Grimm	The Return of the Regulator
"Yo' Sassy Ways"	2001	Warren G, Snoop Dogg	The Return of the Regulator
"So Gangsta"	2002	D-Shot	Nationwide R.A.N. (United We Stand)
"Don't Fight the Feelin'"	2002	Soopafly, Cam'ron, Lady May, Snoop Dogg	Snoop Dogg Presents... Doggy Style Allstars, Vol. 1
"Hey Y'all"	2002	Eve, Snoop Dogg	Eve-Olution
"Walk a Mile"	2002	Shade Sheist, Barbara Wilson, Vita, N.U.N.E.	Informal Introduction
"Come Over"	2002	Big Syke, Yukmouth	Big Syke
"Dead Wrong"	2002	Ms. Jade, Timbaland	Girl Interrupted
"From Long Beach 2 Brick City"	2002	Snoop Dogg, Warren G, Redman	Paid tha Cost to Be da Boss
"All My Life"	2003	Freeway	Philadelphia Freeway
"What U Wanna Do"	2003	Warren G	None
"LBC'n It Up"	2003	Snoop Dogg, Lil' 1/2 Dead	Welcome to tha Chuuch, Vol. 1
"Hey Ho"	2003	Snoop Dogg, David Banner	Welcome to tha Chuuch, Vol. 2
"Look in My Eyes"	2003	Obie Trice	Cheers
"O Wee O"	2003	Duece Poppi	Godzilla Pimpin'
"Keep It Coming"	2003	Rob Stricklong	None
"Ain't No Tellin'"	2004	Omar Epps, G-Sharp	The Get Back
"What We Do"	2004	Knoc-turn'al, Xzibit, Warren G	The Way I Am
"Let's Go"	2004	Goldie Loc, Tray Deee	None
"'Til the End"	2004	Lloyd Banks	The Hunger for More
"Nasty Girl"	2004	Roscoe, Sixx John	West Coast Unified
"Bottom Girl"	2004	Tha Eastsidaz, Kokane	Welcome to tha Chuuch, Vol. 9 (Run Tell Dat)
"Rollin' Down the Highway"	2004	Snoop Dogg, Warren G	Welcome to tha Chuuch, Vol. 9 (Run Tell Dat)
"Dump"	2004	Mobb Deep	Amerikaz Nightmare
"What We Gonna Do"	2004	Guerilla Black, Traci Nelson	Guerilla City
"Po Po"	2004	Fabolous, Paul Cain	Real Talk
"All the Way to St. Lou"	2004	Chingy, David Banner	Powerballin'
"Bitches Ain't Shit"	2004	Lil Jon & the East Side Boyz, Oobie, Suga Free, Snoop Dogg	Crunk Juice
"Child of the Night"	2004	Ludacris	The Red Light District
"Special"	2005	The Game	The Documentary
"Come Close"	2005	Daz Dillinger	Tha Dogg Pound Gangsta LP
"That's My Lady (Money)"	2005	Baby Bash	Super Saucy
"Can't Knock the Hustle"	2005	Damizza	The Baby Ree Mixtape 2005 Los Angeles
"Gangstafied Lady"	2005	N.U.N.E.	The Baby Ree Mixtape 2005 Los Angeles / N.U.N.E. Time
"Bubblin'"	2005	Kam, Yung Bruh	None
"Sammy da Bull"	2005	Proof, Swifty McVay	Searching for Jerry Garcia
"Keep Doin' What They Hate"	2005	Big King	Hard II Kill & Refuse II Die
"PYT"	2005	Warren G, Snoop Dogg	In the Mid-Nite Hour
"Take You There"	2005	Lil' Flip	I Need Mine
"Enjoy Yourself"	2006	Jazze Pha, Cee-Lo Green	None
"Smokin' Smokin' Weed"	2006	Ray J, Shorty Mack, Slim Thug, Snoop Dogg	None
"Dolla Dolla Bill"	2006	None	Waist Deep soundtrack
"All of My Life"	2006	Obie Trice	Second Round's on Me
"Too Much"	2006	The Game	Doctor's Advocate
"Wannabes"	2006	Snoop Dogg, Young Jeezy	Tha Blue Carpet Treatment Mixtape
"Eff Grandad"	2007	Thugnificent, Busta Rhymes, Snoop Dogg	Hip-Hop Docktrine 2: The Official Boondocks Mixtape
"Number 1"	2007	Soopafly, Daz Dillinger, Snoop Dogg	Bangin Westcoast
"Good Relationships"	2007	Ludacris, Katt Williams, Snoop Dogg	None
"Call the Cops"	2007	Filthee	None
"Clownin'"	2007	Warren G	None
"Polnočná Pičakoláda"	2007	Kontrafakt	Bozk Na Rozlúčku
"Could've Been Your Man"	2008	Ese Bobby, Lil' Kasper, Mister D, Lil' Blacky	Southland Psycho
"A L'ancienne"	2008	Psy 4 de la Rime	Les Cités d'Or
"Crook in Me"	2008	Crooked I	None
"L.A."	2008	Nelly, Snoop Dogg	Brass Knuckles
"Mind on My Money"	2009	Slip Capone	Caponey Boy
"Holiday"	2009	Twista	S.O.S. (Save Our Students)
"100 Miles and Runnin'"	2009	Warren G, Raekwon	The G Files
"I'm Faded"	2009	Bishop Lamont & Indef, Son Real	Team America Fuck Yeah: Special Forces
"Cheat'n Ass Lover"	2010	Tha Dogg Pound, Dru Down, Soopafly	100 Wayz
"All on My Balls"	2010	Sleepy Malo	Eternal Sleep
"Saturday"	2015	Warren G, DJ Eazy Dick, E-40, Too Short	Regulate... G Funk Era, Part II EP
"Dead Wrong"	2015	Warren G	Regulate... G Funk Era, Part II EP
"What Can We Do"	2019	Anderson .Paak	Ventura
"Wintertime in June"	2019	Snoop Dogg, Lacci	I Wanna Thank Me
"Outside the Box"	2022	Snoop Dogg	BODR

== Music videos ==
Year	Title	Director	Artist(s)
As main performer
1993	"Indo Smoke"		with Warren G and Mista Grimm
1994	"Regulate"	Cameron Casey	with Warren G
1994	"One More Day"		with Big Pimpin' Delemond
1996	"Never Leave Me Alone"		featuring Snoop Doggy Dogg
1996	"Santa Claus Goes Straight to the Ghetto"	Paul Hunter	with Dat Nigga Daz, Bad Azz, Tray Deee and Snoop Doggy Dogg
1997	"These Days"	G. Thomas Ferguson	with Dat Nigga Daz
1998	"Nobody Does It Better"		with Warren G
2000	"Where I Wanna Be"	Marc Klasfeld	with Shade Sheist and Kurupt
2000	"Oh No"	Jeff Richter	with Mos Def & Pharoahe Monch
2001	"Behind the Walls"	Gregory Dark	with Kurupt
2001	"Area Codes"	Marc Klasfeld	with Ludacris
2001	"I Got Love"	Chris Robinson	—N/a
2003	"One Night Stand"		featuring Simon Vegas, Angie Martinez and Illo 77
2004	"Groupie Luv"	Chris Robinson	with Snoop Dogg and Warren G as 213
2005	"Real Soon"	Anthony Mandler	with Tha Dogg Pound and Snoop Dogg as DPGC
2006	"Have a Party"	Jessy Terrero	with 50 Cent and Mobb Deep
As featured performer
1995	"Let's Play House"	Michael Martin	Tha Dogg Pound, Michel'le
1999	"Bitch Please"	Dr. Dre & Philip Atwell	Snoop Dogg, Xzibit
1999	"Game Don't Wait (Remix)"	Mark Gerard	Warren G, Xzibit, Snoop Dogg
1999	"Girls All Pause"	G-Bone	Kurupt, Roscoe
2000	"The Next Episode"	Paul Hunter	Dr. Dre, Snoop Dogg, Kurupt
2000	"Nah, Nah..."	Andy Kawanami	E-40
2001	"Lay Low"	Hype Williams	Snoop Dogg, Butch Cassidy, Goldie Loc, Tray Deee, Master P
2001	"Can't Deny It"	Director X	Fabolous
2001	"Connected"		Shaquille O' Neal, WC
2001	"Ballin' Out of Control"	Dave Meyers	Jermaine Dupri
2002	"Multiply"	Chris Robinson	Xzibit
2002	"The Streets"	Chris Robinson	WC, Snoop Dogg
2003	"21 Questions"	Damon Johnson, Dr. Dre & Philip Atwell	50 Cent
2003	"Gangsta Nation"	Dave Meyers	Westside Connection
2003	"Ooh Wee"	Rich Newey	Mark Ronson, Ghostface Killah, Saigon, Trife
2004	"The Set Up"	Bryan Barber	Obie Trice
2004	"Time's Up"	Chris Robinson	Jadakiss
2004	"I Like That"	Jeremy Rall	Houston, Chingy, I-20
2005	"Hush Is Coming"	Flyy Kai	Hush
2005	"Like This"	Benny Boom	Mack 10
2005	"I Need a Light"	Paul Hunter	Warren G
2006	"Shake That"	Plates Animation	Eminem
2006	"Crazy"	Snoop Dogg & Terrance C. Ball	Snoop Dogg
2007	"Boss' Life"	Anthony Mandler	Snoop Dogg
2007	"I'm Coming Home to You"		Down AKA Kilo
Cameo appearances (No vocals, just brief appearance in the video)
1992	"Puffin' on Blunts and Drankin' Tanqueray"		Dr. Dre, Tha Dogg Pound, Lady of Rage
1993	"Lil' Ghetto Boy"	Dr. Dre	Dr. Dre, Snoop Doggy Dogg
1994	"Gin and Juice"	Dr. Dre	Snoop Doggy Dogg
1996	"Slip 'n Slide"	J. Kevin Swain	Danny Boy
1997	"Vapors"	Paul Hunter	Snoop Doggy Dogg
2001	"Get Ur Freak On"	Dave Meyers	Missy Elliott
2005	"Ups & Downs	Anthony Mandler	Snoop Dogg
