= Death Row Records discography =

Death Row Records full discography with all albums, compilations, EP's & singles release.

== Studio albums ==
List of studio albums, with selected chart positions, sales figures and certifications
Title	Album details	Peak chart positions										Sales	Certifications
Title	Album details	US	US R&B	AUS	CAN	FRA	GER	NLD	NZ	SWI	UK	Sales	Certifications
The Chronic (album by Dr. Dre)	Released: December 15, 1992; Labels: Death Row, Interscope, Priority; Formats: CD, LP, cassette, digital download	3	1	91	—	—	74	—	—	—	43	US: 5,700,000	RIAA: 3× Platinum
Doggystyle (album by Snoop Doggy Dogg)	Released: November 23, 1993; Labels: Death Row, Interscope; Formats: CD, LP, cassette, digital download	1	1	24	10	—	—	21	25	24	38	US: 6,957,000	RIAA: 4× Platinum
Dogg Food (album by Tha Dogg Pound)	Released: October 31, 1995; Labels: Death Row, Interscope, Priority; Formats: CD, LP, cassette, digital download	1	1	—	—	—	—	—	—	—	—	US: 1,740,000	RIAA: 2× Platinum
All Eyez on Me (album by 2Pac)	Released: February 13, 1996; Labels: Death Row, Interscope; Formats: CD, LP, cassette, digital download	1	1	19	11	99	16	11	15	15	32	US: 6,400,000	RIAA: Diamond
The Don Killuminati: The 7 Day Theory (album by Makaveli)	Released: November 5, 1996; Labels: Death Row, Makaveli, Interscope; Formats: CD, LP, cassette, digital download	1	1	37	25	—	76	61	17	—	53	US: 5,000,000	RIAA: 4× Platinum
Tha Doggfather (album by Snoop Doggy Dogg)	Released: November 12, 1996; Labels: Death Row, Interscope; Formats: CD, LP, cassette, digital download	1	1	12	2	9	23	48	6	41	15	US: 1,984,000	RIAA: 2× Platinum
Necessary Roughness (album by The Lady of Rage)	Released: June 24, 1997; Labels: Death Row, Interscope; Formats: CD, LP, cassette, digital download	32	7	—	—	—	—	—	—	—	—	US:	RIAA:
Retaliation, Revenge and Get Back (album by Daz Dillinger)	Released: March 31, 1998; Labels: Death Row, Priority; Formats: CD, LP, cassette, digital download	8	2	—	—	—	—	—	—	—	—	US: 500,000	RIAA: Gold
Hung Jury (album by Michel'le)	Released: August 24, 1998; Labels: Death Row, Priority; Formats: CD, LP, cassette, digital download	—	56	—	—	—	—	—	—	—	—	US:	RIAA:
Still I Rise (album by 2Pac & Outlawz)	Released: December 21, 1999; Labels: Death Row, Interscope; Formats: CD, LP, cassette, digital download	6	2	—	9	—	24	24	49	86	75	US: 1,000,000	RIAA: Platinum
Until the End of Time (album by 2Pac)	Released: March 21, 2001; Labels: Death Row, Interscope, Amaru; Formats: CD, LP, cassette, digital download	1	1	1	1	1	2	1	1	2	1	US: 4,000,000	RIAA: 4× Platinum
Better Dayz (album by 2Pac)	Released: November 26, 2002; Labels: Tha Row, Interscope, Amaru; Formats: CD, LP, cassette, digital download	5	1	—	7	52	45	36	40	60	68	US: 3,000,000	RIAA: 3× Platinum
Against the Grain (album by Kurupt)	Released: August 23, 2005; Labels: Death Row, Koch; Formats: CD, LP, cassette, digital download	60	—	—	—	—	—	—	—	—	—	US:	RIAA:
It's About Time (album by Danny Boy)	Released: April 20, 2010; Labels: Death Row, WIDEawake; Formats: CD, LP, cassette, digital download	—	—	—	—	—	—	—	—	—	—	US:	RIAA:
Street Scholars (album by Sam Sneed)	Released: January 25, 2011; Labels: Death Row, WIDEawake; Formats: CD, LP, cassette, digital download	—	—	—	—	—	—	—	—	—	—	US:	RIAA:
Haven't You Heard (album by LBC Crew)	Released: February 8, 2011; Labels: Death Row, WIDEawake; Formats: CD, LP, cassette, digital download	—	—	—	—	—	—	—	—	—	—	US:	RIAA:
Damn Near Dead (album by O.F.T.B.)	Released: July 12, 2011; Labels: Death Row, WIDEawake; Formats: CD, LP, cassette, digital download	—	—	—	—	—	—	—	—	—	—	US:	RIAA:
Black Diamond (album by Jewell)	Released: November 22, 2011; Labels: Death Row, WIDEawake; Formats: CD, LP, cassette, digital download	—	—	—	—	—	—	—	—	—	—	US:	RIAA:
BODR (album by Snoop Dogg)	Released: February 11, 2022; Labels: Death Row, Create; Formats: CD, LP, cassette, digital download	104	—	—	97	—	—	—	—	28	—	US:	RIAA:
World of Women (album by Jane Handcock)	Released: January 20, 2023; Labels: Death Row; Formats: CD, digital download	—	—	—	—	—	—	—	—	—	—	US:	RIAA:
The Rebirth of Marvin (album by October London)	Released: February 10, 2023; Labels: Death Row; Formats: CD, digital download	—	—	—	—	—	—	—	—	—	—	US:	RIAA:
W.A.W.G. (We All We Got) (album by Tha Dogg Pound)	Released: May 31, 2024; Labels: Death Row, gamma.; Formats: CD, digital download	—	—	—	—	—	—	—	—	—	—	US:	RIAA:
October Nights (album by October London)	Released: October 11, 2024; Labels: Death Row, gamma.; Formats: CD, digital download	—	—	—	—	—	—	—	—	—	—	US:	RIAA:
Missionary (album by Snoop Dogg)	Released: December 13, 2024; Labels: Death Row, Aftermath, Interscope; Formats: CD, digital download	20	7	27	34	26	7	—	19	4	24	US:	RIAA:
Walk With the Father (album by Charlie Bereal)	Released: January 24, 2025; Labels: Death Row, gamma.; Formats: CD, digital download	—	—	—	—	—	—	—	—	—	—	US:	RIAA:
Iz It a Crime? (album by Snoop Dogg)	Released: May 15, 2025; Labels: Death Row, gamma.; Formats: CD, digital download	—	—	—	—	—	—	—	—	—	—	US:	RIAA:
It's Me, Not You (album by Jane Handcock)	Released: July 11, 2025; Labels: Death Row, gamma.; Formats: CD, digital download	—	—	—	—	—	—	—	—	—	—	US:	RIAA:
10 Til' Midnight (album by Snoop Dogg)	Released: April 10, 2026; Labels: Death Row, gamma.; Formats: CD, digital download	—	—	—	—	—	—	—	—	—	—	US:	RIAA:
Tales From My Hood (album by Kurupt & DJ Battlecat)	Released: July 31, 2026; Labels: Death Row, gamma.; Formats: CD, digital download	—	—	—	—	—	—	—	—	—	—	US:	RIAA:
"—" denotes a recording that did not chart or was not released in that territory.

== Compilation albums ==
List of compilation albums, with selected chart positions, sales figures and certifications
Title	Album details	Peak chart positions										Sales	Certifications
Title	Album details	US	US R&B	AUS	BEL (FL)	CAN	GER	NLD	NZ	SWI	UK	Sales	Certifications
Death Row Greatest Hits (album by Various Artists)	Released: November 26, 1996; Label: Death Row, Interscope; Formats: CD, LP, cassette	35	15	—	—	—	—	—	—	—	—		
Christmas on Death Row (album by Various Artists)	Released: December 3, 1996; Label: Death Row, Interscope; Formats: CD, LP, cassette	155	30	—	—	—	—	—	—	—	—		
Greatest Hits (album by 2Pac)	Released: November 24, 1998; Label: Death Row, Amaru, Interscope, Jive; Formats: CD, LP, cassette	3	1	11	3	18	9	1	19	13	17	US: 5,330,000	RIAA: Diamond
Suge Knight Represents: Chronic 2000 (album by Various Artists)	Released: May 4, 1999; Label: Death Row, Priority; Formats: CD, LP, cassette	11	3	—	—	—	—	—	—	—	—		
Too Gangsta for Radio (album by Various Artists)	Released: September 26, 2000; Label: Death Row, Priority; Formats: CD, LP, cassette	171	44	—	—	—	—	—	—	—	—		
Dead Man Walkin' (album by Snoop Doggy Dogg)	Released: October 31, 2000; Label: Death Row, D3; Formats: CD, LP, cassette	24	11	—	—	41	—	—	48	—	—	US: 220,478	RIAA: Gold
2002 (album by The Dogg Pound)	Released: July 31, 2001; Label: Death Row, D3; Formats: CD, LP, cassette	—	—	—	—	—	—	—	—	—	—		
Death Row: Snoop Doggy Dogg at His Best (album by Snoop Doggy Dogg)	Released: October 22, 2001; Label: Death Row, Priority; Formats: CD	28	18	86	—	19	—	89	9	80	90	UK: 100,000; NZ: 7,500	BPI: Gold; RMNZ: Gold
The Very Best of Death Row (album by Various Artists)	Released: February 22, 2005; Label: Death Row, Koch; Formats: CD	95	—	—	—	—	—	—	—	—	—		
15 Years on Death Row (album by Various Artists)	Released: December 26, 2006; Label: Death Row, Koch; Formats: CD	—	—	—	—	—	—	—	—	—	—		
Doggy Bag (album by The Dogg Pound)	Released: July 3, 2012; Label: Death Row, WIDEawake; Formats: CD, LP	—	—	—	—	—	—	—	—	—	—		
"—" denotes a recording that did not chart or was not released in that territory.

== Soundtrack albums ==
List of soundtrack albums, with selected chart positions, sales figures and certifications
Title	Album details	Peak chart positions										Sales	Certifications
Title	Album details	US	US R&B	BEL (FL)	CAN	FRA	GER	IRL	NLD	SWI	UK	Sales	Certifications
Above the Rim (album by Various Artist)	Released: March 22, 1994; Label: Death Row, Interscope; Formats: CD, LP, cassette, Digital Download	2	1	—	—	—	—	—	—	—	—	US: 2,142,290	RIAA: 2× Platinum
Murder Was the Case (album by Various Artist)	Released: October 15, 1994; Label: Death Row, Interscope; Formats: CD, LP, cassette	1	1	—	—	—	—	—	—	—	—	US: 2,030,000	RIAA: 2× Platinum
Gridlock'd (album by Various Artist)	Released: January 28, 1997; Label: Death Row, Interscope; Formats: CD, LP, cassette, Digital Download	1	1	—	—	—	—	—	—	—	—	US: 1,000,000	RIAA: Platinum
Gang Related (album by Various Artist)	Released: October 7, 1997; Label: Death Row, Priority; Formats: CD, LP, cassette, Digital Download	2	1	—	—	—	—	—	—	—	—	US: 1,000,000	RIAA: 2× Platinum
Dysfunktional Family (album by Various Artist)	Released: March 11, 2003; Label: Death Row, Priority; Formats: CD, LP, cassette, Digital Download	95	14	—	—	—	—	—	—	—	—		
"—" denotes a recording that did not chart or was not released in that territory.

== Live albums ==
List of live albums, with selected chart positions and certifications
Title	Album details	Peak chart positions						Certifications
Title	Album details	US	US R&B	FRA	GER	IRL	UK	Certifications
2Pac Live	Released: August 10, 2004; Label: Death Row, Koch; Formats: CD, LP, cassette, digital download	54	16	84	86	52	67	
Live at the House of Blues	Released: September 20, 2005; Labels: Death Row, Koch; Formats: CD, cassette, digital download	159	48	179	—	—	—	RIAA: Platinum; ARIA: Gold; BPI: Gold
"—" denotes a recording that did not chart or was not released in that territory.

== Singles ==
List of singles as lead artist, with selected chart positions and certifications, showing year released and album name
Title	Year	Peak chart positions										Certifications	Album
Title	Year	US	US R&B	US Rap	FRA	GER	IRE	NL	NZ	SWI	UK	Certifications	Album
"Nuthin' but a 'G' Thang" Dr. Dre (featuring Snoop Doggy Dogg)	1992	2	1	1	—	—	—	—	39	—	31	RIAA: Platinum	The Chronic
"Fuck wit Dre Day (And Everybody's Celebratin')" Dr. Dre (featuring Snoop Doggy Dogg)	1993	8	6	13	—	—	—	—	49	—	59	RIAA: Gold	The Chronic
"Let Me Ride" Dr. Dre (featuring Snoop Doggy Dogg)	1993	34	3	3	—	—	—	—	—	—	31		The Chronic
"What's My Name?" Snoop Doggy Dogg	1993	8	8	13	22	11	20	8	4	21	20	RIAA: Gold	Doggystyle
"Gin and Juice" Snoop Doggy Dogg	1994	8	13	49	—	—	—	—	11	—	39	RIAA: Gold	Doggystyle
"Regulate" Warren G (featuring Nate Dogg)	1994	2	7	1	16	7	7	5	4	5	5	RIAA: Platinum; ARIA: Gold; BPI: Gold; BVMI: Gold	Above The Rim
"Doggy Dogg World" Snoop Doggy Dogg (featuring Tha Dogg Pound and The Dramatics)	1994	—	25	—	—	—	—	—	—	—	32		Doggystyle
"Afro Puffs" The Lady of Rage (featuring Snoop Doggy Dogg)	1994	57	31	5	—	—	—	—	—	—	—		Above The Rim
"Didn't Mean to Turn You On" 2nd II None	1994	—	—	—	—	—	—	—	—	—	—		Above The Rim
"Part Time Lover" H-Town	1994	57	9	—	—	—	—	—	—	—	—		Above The Rim
"I'm Still in Love with You" Al B. Sure!	1994	—	—	—	—	—	—	—	—	—	—		Above The Rim
"Murder Was the Case" Snoop Doggy Dogg	1994	—	—	—	—	—	—	—	—	—	—		Murder Was the Case
"Woman to Woman" Jewell	1994	—	—	—	—	—	—	—	—	—	—		Murder Was the Case
"One More Day" Nate Dogg	1994	—	106	—	—	—	—	—	—	—	—		Murder Was the Case
"Natural Born Killaz" Dr. Dre and Ice Cube	1994	—	—	—	—	—	—	—	—	—	—		Murder Was the Case
"What Would You Do" Tha Dogg Pound (featuring Snoop Doggy Dogg)	1995	—	—	—	—	—	—	—	—	—	—		Murder Was the Case
"U Better Recognize" Sam Sneed (featuring Dr. Dre)	1995	—	48	18	—	—	—	—	—	—	—		Murder Was the Case
"Respect" Tha Dogg Pound	1995	—	35	—	—	—	—	—	—	—	—		Dogg Food
"New York, New York" Tha Dogg Pound (featuring Snoop Doggy Dogg)	1995	—	51	—	—	—	—	—	—	—	—		Dogg Food
"California Love" 2Pac (featuring Dr. Dre and Roger Troutman)	1995	1	1	1	—	7	—	7	1	7	6	RIAA: 2× Platinum; ARIA: Gold; BPI: Gold; RMNZ: Platinum; MC: Gold	All Eyez on Me
"Let's Play House" Tha Dogg Pound (featuring Michel'le)	1995	45	21	5	—	—	—	—	—	—	—		Dogg Food
"2 of Amerikaz Most Wanted" 2Pac (featuring Snoop Doggy Dogg)	1996	—	—	—	—	—	—	—	—	—	—		All Eyez on Me
"How Do U Want It" 2Pac (featuring K-Ci & JoJo)	1996	1	1	1	—	74	—	—	2	37	17	RIAA: 2× Platinum; ARIA: Gold; RMNZ: Gold	All Eyez on Me
"Snoop's Upside Ya Head" Snoop Doggy Dogg (featuring Charlie Wilson)	1996	—	37	—	—	34	—	32	7	—	12	RMNZ: Gold	Tha Doggfather
"I Ain't Mad at Cha" 2Pac (featuring Danny Boy)	1996	—	—	—	—	86	—	—	2	—	13	RMNZ: Gold	All Eyez on Me
"Toss It Up" Makaveli (featuring Danny Boy, K-Ci & JoJo and Aaron Hall)	1996	—	13	5	—	—	—	—	7	—	15	RMNZ: Gold	The Don Killuminati: The 7 Day Theory
"Never Leave Me Alone" Nate Dogg (featuring Snoop Doggy Dogg and Val Young)	1996	33	22	—	—	—	—	—	2	—	—		G-Funk Classics, Vol. 1
"To Live & Die in L.A." Makaveli (featuring Val Young)	1996	—	16	7	—	—	—	—	9	—	10		The Don Killuminati: The 7 Day Theory
"Who Been There, Who Done That" J-Flexx	1996	—	—	—	—	—	—	—	—	—	—		Death Row Greatest Hits
"Santa Claus Goes Straight to the Ghetto" Snoop Doggy Dogg (featuring Dat Nigga Daz, Nate Dogg, Tray Deee and Bad Azz)	1996	—	75	—	—	—	—	—	—	—	—		Christmas on Death Row
"Hail Mary" Makaveli (featuring Outlawz and Prince Ital Joe)	1997	—	12	4	—	—	—	—	—	—	43		The Don Killuminati: The 7 Day Theory
"These Days" Nate Dogg (featuring Dat Nigga Daz)	1997	—	—	—	—	—	—	—	—	—	—		G-Funk Classics, Vol. 1
"Vapors" Snoop Doggy Dogg (featuring Teena Marie and Charlie Wilson)	1997	—	—	—	—	—	—	—	7	—	18		Tha Doggfather
"Wanted Dead or Alive" 2Pac and Snoop Doggy Dogg	1997	—	—	—	—	—	—	—	3	—	18		Gridlock'd
"—" denotes a recording that did not chart or was not released in that territory.	1997												

== Unreleased projects ==
- The Chronic II: A New World Odor (Poppa's Got A Brand New Funk) (1996) - Dr. Dre: In 1995, Death Row announced the possibility of a sequel to The Chronic, and was set to contain the "California Love" single featuring 2Pac. During its production, Dr. Dre left Death Row due to the ongoing East Coast–West Coast hip hop rivalry to start Aftermath Entertainment. The Chronic II was later developed to 2001, and was going to be titled Chronic 2000, but had to be changed due to Suge Knight naming his compilation Suge Knight Represents: Chronic 2000. 2001 was finally released on November 16, 1999, as a commercial and critical success.
- Death Row Records Presents: Inside Out Compilation (1998): Was originally going to be distributed by Breakaway Entertainment on October 6, 1998, but got shelved due to Breakaway getting bankrupt and Suge Knight wanting to get revenge on Dr. Dre. Instead, it was replaced by Suge Knight Represents: Chronic 2000, which some of the songs were from the planned Inside Out compilation.
- N.I.N.A." (New Identity Not Applicable) (2002) - N.I.N.A.: Lisa Lopes, known as Left Eye and being a member of R&B group TLC, signed to Death Row after numerous talks with Suge Knight. Lopes began recording her second solo album, while working on TLC's 3D. She planned for David Bowie, Ray J, and Missy Elliott to be featured in the project. When the album was almost finished, Lopes fatally died in a car accident on April 25, 2002. Death Row still had plans to release the album, but got cancelled later for unknown reasons. The album was later leaked in 2011.
- Innocent Man (2002) - Mark Morrison: In 2001, Death Row entered the UK market in conjunction with the Ritz Music Group, just after Suge Knight was released from prison. One of its UK subsidiary artists was Mark Morrison, known for his hit "Return of the Mack". Morrison recorded the album Innocent Man, featuring DMX and Daz Dillinger. It was set to be released on 29 April 2002, but got shelved due to label conflicts. The album was later released by Mona Records in 2006, but failed to chart.
