= List of Death Row Records artists =

Death Row Records is an American independent record label. Artists include:

== 2 ==
- 2nd II None
- 2Pac

== A ==
- Above the Law

== B ==
- Bad Azz

== C ==
- CPO Boss Hogg*
- Crooked I*

== D ==
- Danny Boy
- Daz Dillinger
- Dr. Dre
- DJ Quik

== J ==
- J. Valentine
- J-Flexx
- Jewell

== K ==
- K-Solo
- Kurupt

== L ==
- The Lady of Rage
- LBC Crew
- Lil' C-Style
- Lil' Bow Wow
- Lisa "Left Eye" Lopes

== M ==
- Makaveli
- MC Hammer
- Michel'le
- Miilkbone
- Mr. Malik
- Mark Morrison

== N ==
- Nate Dogg

== O ==
- October London
- Outlawz
- O.F.T.B.

== P ==
- Petey Pablo
- Prince Ital Joe

== R ==
- RBX
- Tha Realest

== S ==
- SKG (Helecia Choyce)
- Sam Sneed
- Slip Capone
- Snoop Doggy Dogg
- Soopafly
- Spider Loc
- Suga Free

== T ==
- Techniec
- Tha Dogg Pound
- Tha Realest
- The D.O.C.
- The Convictz
- Tray Deee
- Tupac Shakur

== Y ==
- YGD Tha Top Dogg
- Young Soldierz

== See also ==
- Death Row Records
- Death Row Records Discography
