= Essentials (Nate Dogg album) =

Compilation album by Nate Dogg
- Released: January 8, 2002
- Recorded: 1995–98
- Genre: West Coast hip-hop, R&B
- Label: Victor
- Producer: Daz Dillinger, Nate Dogg, Warren G, Teddy Riley, Soopafly, Sean "Barney" Thomas

Nate Dogg chronology
Music & Me (2001)	Essentials (2002)	Nate Dogg (2003)

Professional ratings
Review scores
Source	Rating
Allmusic	3/5 stars

Essentials is a compilation album released by hip-hop artist Nate Dogg in 2002. All 16 tracks are taken from Nate Dogg’s debut album G-Funk Classics, Vol. 1 & 2.

== Track listing ==
1. "Nobody Does It Better" (Featuring Warren G)
2. "Who's Playin' Games?"
3. "I Don't Wanna Hurt No More" (Featuring Danny "Butch" Means)
4. "Me and My Homies" (Featuring 2Pac)
5. "Because I Got a Girl"
6. "Scared of Love" (Featuring Danny "Butch" Means)
7. "Just Another Day"
8. "Dogg Pound Gangstaville" (Featuring Snoop Dogg and Kurupt)
9. "No Matter Where I Go"
10. "Friends" (Featuring Snoop Dogg and Warren G)
11. "She's Strange" (Featuring Barbara Wilson)
12. "Never Leave Me Alone" (Featuring Snoop Dogg)
13. "My Money"
14. "Puppy Love" (Featuring Snoop Dogg, Daz Dillinger and Kurupt)
15. "Never Too Late"
16. "Hardest Man in Town"
