= Suge Knight Represents: Chronic 2000 =

1999 compilation album

Suge Knight Represents: Chronic 2000 - Still Smokin'

Compilation album by various artists
- Released: May 4, 1999
- Studios: Ameraycan (North Hollywood, Los Angeles); Can-Am (Tarzana, Los Angeles); Echo Sound (Atwater Village, Los Angeles); Skip Saylor (Los Angeles); Sound Castle (Los Angeles)
- Genres: West Coast hip-hop; gangsta rap; g-funk
- Length: 125:11
- Labels: Death Row; Priority
- Producers: Suge Knight (exec.); 2 Tuff; Ant Banks; Blaqthoven; Charlie B.; Darryl "Big D" Harper; Daz Dillinger; DJ Quik; J-Flexx; Johnny "J"; Kevyn Lewis; Kurt "Kobane" Couthon; L.T. Hutton; Michel'le; Reggie Moore; The Wooze

Death Row Records chronology
Gang Related (1997)	Suge Knight Represents: Chronic 2000 (1999)	Too Gangsta for Radio (2000)

Singles from Suge Knight Represents: Chronic 2000
- 1. "Presenting Millkbone (Eminem Diss)" Released: March 13, 1999; 2. "Like It or Not" Released: June 11, 1999; 3. "Who Do U Believe In" Released: November 1, 1999

Professional ratings
Review scores
Source	Rating
AllMusic	1.5/5 stars

Suge Knight Represents: Chronic 2000 - Still Smokin' is a compilation album released on May 4, 1999, by Death Row Records and distributed by Priority Records. The album features performances by various artists, including 2Pac, Treach, Scarface, Tha Realest, Swoop G, Lil' C-Style, K-Ci, Soopafly, Jewell, Danny Boy, Outlawz, Daz Dillinger, Kurupt, E-40, Top Dogg, DJ Quik, and Miilkbone among others. Although the album charted well on the Billboard Top R&B/Hip-Hop Albums and Billboard 200 charts, the album was received poorly by fans and critics.

== Title ==
The title, "Chronic 2000", was the original title for former Death Row artist Dr. Dre's anticipated second studio album but Suge Knight took the title and used it for this album, forcing Dr. Dre to retitle his album 2001.

== Track listing ==
No.	Title	Writer(s)	Producer(s)	Length
1.	"Chronic 2000" (VK featuring Treach)	Vanesha Knight; Anthony Criss	Michel'le	5:36
2.	"Gotta Love Gangsta's" (Tha Realest featuring Scarface and Richie Rich)	Jevon Jones; Brad Jordan; Richard Serrell	Darryl "Big D" Harper	3:48
3.	"Top Dogg Cindafella" (Top Dogg)	Dana McCleese; Hurby Azor	J-Flexx	3:41
4.	"Who Do U Believe In?" (2Pac featuring Yaki Kadafi)	Tupac Shakur; Yafeu Fula	Johnny "J"	5:30
5.	"I Thought You Knew" (Mac Shawn featuring E-40 and Daz Dillinger)	DeShawn Dawson; Earl Stevens; Delmar Arnaud	Daz Dillinger	3:58
6.	"Curiosity" (VK)	Knight	J-Flexx	4:48
7.	"It's Goin' Down" (Mac Shawn featuring Daz Dillinger and Tha Realest)	Dawson; Arnaud; Jones	Daz Dillinger; Blaqthoven	4:24
8.	"Don't Forget Where You Came From" (Swoop G)	James Parker	Charlie B.	4:09
9.	"Like It or Not" (Soopafly)	Priest Joseph Brooks; Val Young; Lenton Hutton	L.T. Hutton	5:02
10.	"Easy to Be a Soldier When There Ain't No War" (Tha Realest, Swoop G and Lil' C-Style)	Jones; Parker; Ronald Gillion	Kurt "Kobane" Couthon	4:28
11.	"Beautiful Lady" (Danny Boy featuring K-Ci)	Daniel Steward; Cedric Hailey	Kurt "Kobane" Couthon	4:26
12.	"Stand Strong" (Tha Realest featuring Danny Boy and Jewell)	Jones; Jewell Caples	Kurt "Kobane" Couthon	5:11
13.	"We Don't Love 'Em" (Top Dogg)	Derrick Wade	DJ Quik	4:53
14.	"Because of You Girl" (Tha Dogg Pound featuring Tha Realest)	Arnaud; Ricardo Brown; Jones; Kevin Vernado	Daz Dillinger	4:33
15.	"Roll Wit' Us" (Tha Dogg Pound)	Arnaud; Brown	Daz Dillinger	5:06
16.	"Drinks on Me" (Captain Save 'Em and Ant Banks)	Kevin Dickson; Anthony Banks	Ant Banks	3:50
17.	"Late Night" (Outlawz and DJ Quik)	Shakur	DJ Quik	4:17
18.	"They Wanna Be Like Us" (Tha Realest featuring Top Dogg and Doobie)	Jones; Wade; Elbert Turner	Kurt "Kobane" Couthon	5:45
19.	"OG to BG" (Soopafly and Tha Dogg Pound)	Brooks; Arnaud; Brown	Daz Dillinger	4:52
20.	"Interlude: I Wanna Be Loved by You" (Kelmar, Ruby & Stothart)			0:34
21.	"Wanna Be Loved" (Michel'le and VK)	Michel'le Toussant; Knight	Michel'le	4:08
22.	"I'm Coming Home" (Tha Realest featuring Jewell)	Jones; Reggie Moore	Reggie Moore	4:16
23.	"I'm Country" (Doobie)	Turner	Kurt "Kobane" Couthon	4:55
24.	"Presenting Milkbone" (Miilkbone and Naji)	Thomas G. Wlodarczyk	The Wooze	3:43
25.	"The Things Your Man Won't Do" (VK)	Knight	J-Flexx	4:06
26.	"Now That" (Capricorn)	Capricorn Clark; George Clinton III; Philippé Wynne	Kevyn Lewis	4:23
27.	"Ride or Get Rode On" (Bad Habitz)	Eugene Colvin; Timothy Edwards; Brian Milas; Lamar Carl	2 Tuff	4:09
28.	"Mr. Officer" (Michel'le, Captain Save 'Em and El Dorado)	Toussant; Dickson; Jaco Sansom	Kurt "Kobane" Couthon	4:44
Total length:				125:11

== Charts ==
=== Weekly charts ===
Chart (1999)	Peak position
US Billboard 200	11
US Top R&B/Hip-Hop Albums (Billboard)	3

=== Year-end charts ===
Chart (1999)	Position
US Top R&B/Hip-Hop Albums (Billboard)	96
