= Santa Claus Goes Straight to the Ghetto =

1996 single by Snoop Dogg featuring Daz Dillinger, Nate Dogg, Tray Deee, and Bad Azz

Single by Snoop Doggy Dogg featuring Daz Dillinger, Nate Dogg, Tray Deee, and Bad Azz

from the album Christmas on Death Row
- Released: December 5, 1996
- Recorded: 1996
- Genre: Christmas music, West Coast hip hop, G-Funk
- Length: 5:50; 4:45 (Radio edit)
- Label: Death Row; Interscope
- Producer: Snoop Dogg

Snoop Doggy Dogg singles chronology
| "Never Leave Me Alone" (1996) | "Santa Claus Goes Straight to the Ghetto" (1996) | "Vapors" (1997) |

Nate Dogg singles chronology
| "Never Leave Me Alone" (1996) | "Santa Claus Goes Straight to the Ghetto" (1996) | "These Days" (1997) |

Music video
- "Santa Claus Goes Straight to the Ghetto" on YouTube

"Santa Claus Goes Straight to the Ghetto" is a Christmas song recorded by American rapper Snoop Doggy Dogg featuring Daz Dillinger, Nate Dogg, Tray Deee, and Bad Azz. It was released as the only single from the album, Christmas on Death Row. The song appeared in 2002 stoner comedy film Friday After Next.

The song is titled after James Brown's version of "Santa Claus Go Straight to the Ghetto" from the 1968 album, A Soulful Christmas.

The music is taken from Isaac Hayes's song "Do Your Thing", originally released on the 1971 appeared Shaft soundtrack.

== Music video ==
The music video was released in December 1996.

== Charts ==
| Chart (1996–97) | Peak position |
|---|---|
| U.S. Billboard Hot R&B/Hip-Hop Airplay | 75 |
