= I Got Love (Nate Dogg song) =

Single by Nate Dogg

from the album Music and Me
- Released: 2001
- Length: 3:58
- Label: Elektra
- Songwriters: Nathaniel D. Hale; R. Harrell
- Producer: Bink

Nate Dogg singles chronology
"Area Codes" (2001)	"I Got Love" (2001)	"Multiply" (2002)

"I Got Love" is a song by American hip-hop and R&B recording artist Nate Dogg. The song is the first single released from the Music and Me (2001) album. The song was produced by Bink. Angell Conwell, Fabolous, & Kurupt make cameo appearances in the music video.

== Charts ==
=== Weekly charts ===
Chart (2001)	Peak position
US Hot R&B/Hip-Hop Songs (Billboard)	45
US Rhythmic Airplay (Billboard)	33

== Certifications ==
Certification for "I Got Love"
Region	Certification	Certified units/sales
New Zealand (RMNZ)	Platinum	30,000^{‡}
^{‡} Sales+streaming figures based on certification alone.
