= Never Leave Me Alone =

1996 single by Nate Dogg featuring Snoop Doggy Dogg

Single by Nate Dogg featuring Snoop Doggy Dogg

from the album G-Funk Classics, Vol. 1 & 2
- Released: October 22, 1996
- Genre: R&B; g-funk; hip hop soul
- Length: 5:56
- Label: Death Row; Interscope
- Songwriters: Nate Dogg; Snoop Doggy Dogg
- Producer: Kurupt the Kingpin

Nate Dogg singles chronology
"One More Day" (1994)	"Never Leave Me Alone" (1996)	"Santa Claus Goes Straight to the Ghetto" (1996)

Snoop Doggy Dogg singles chronology
"Snoop's Upside Ya Head" (1996)	"Never Leave Me Alone" (1996)	"Santa Claus Goes Straight to the Ghetto" (1996)

Music video
- "Never Leave Me Alone" on YouTube

"Never Leave Me Alone" is a song by American rapper and singer Nate Dogg, featuring vocals from fellow rapper Snoop Doggy Dogg. The song is the first single released from Nate Dogg's debut studio album G-Funk Classics, Vol. 1 & 2 (1998), and contains an interpolation of the 1972 song "Where Is the Love", written by Ralph MacDonald and William Salter, and recorded by Roberta Flack and Donny Hathaway. The song was produced by Kurupt and executive produced by Suge Knight.

The song contains background vocals by Nate Dogg and Val Young.

== Commercial performance ==
"Never Leave Me Alone" debuted at number 50 on the United States Billboard Hot 100 chart dated November 9, 1996. Internationally the song peaked at number two in New Zealand Recorded Music NZ chart and has been certified platinum in the country.

== Music video ==
The song's official music video depicts Nate Dogg arrested and confined to prison where he tries to maintain a relationship with his wife and young son. Snoop Doggy Dogg also appears in the video during his verse. The music video was released in October 1996. The video later served as inspiration for the music video for 50 Cent's 2003 single 21 Questions, which featured Nate Dogg.

== Track listing ==
- CD Single
1. Never Leave Me Alone (Radio Edit) (featuring Snoop Doggy Dogg) – 4:57
2. Never Leave Me Alone (Instrumental) – 5:40
- 12-inch single
1. Never Leave Me Alone (Radio Edit) (featuring Snoop Doggy Dogg) – 4:57
2. Never Leave Me Alone (Instrumental) – 5:40
3. Never Leave Me Alone (LP Version) (featuring Snoop Doggy Dogg) – 5:50

== Charts ==
=== Weekly charts ===
Chart (1996)	Peak position
New Zealand (Recorded Music NZ)	2
US Billboard Hot 100	33
US Hot R&B/Hip-Hop Songs (Billboard)	22
US Rhythmic Airplay (Billboard)	32

=== Year-end charts ===
Chart (1997)	Position
New Zealand (Recorded Music NZ)	46

== Certifications ==
Region	Certification	Certified units/sales
New Zealand (RMNZ)	Platinum	10,000^{*}
^{*} Sales figures based on certification alone.
