= Nobody Does It Better (Nate Dogg song) =

1998 song

Single by Nate Dogg featuring Warren G

from the album G-Funk Classics, Vol. 1 & 2 & Woo (soundtrack)
- Released: June 1998
- Genre: Hip hop soul; West Coast hip hop; G-funk
- Length: 4:29
- Label: Breakaway
- Songwriters: Nathaniel D. Hale; Warren Griffin III
- Producer: Warren G

Nate Dogg solo singles chronology
"These Days" (1997)	"Nobody Does It Better" (1998)	"I Don’t Wanna Hurt No More" (1998)

Warren G singles chronology
"All Night, All Right" (1998)	"Nobody Does It Better" (1998)	"I Want It All" (1999)

"Nobody Does It Better" is a song by American singer-songwriter Nate Dogg, featuring vocals from rapper Warren G. It was released in June 1998 as the second single from Nate Dogg's debut studio album G-Funk Classics, Vol. 1 & 2 (1998). The song was produced by Warren G, and samples and contains an interpolation from "Let's Get Closer" by Atlantic Starr. The song was later sampled by rapper G Herbo in his song “No Jail Time” from his 2021 album “25” The song also appeared on the soundtrack to the 1998 film Woo, which was released a month earlier.

== Commercial performance ==
"Nobody Does It Better", which became his biggest hit as a solo artist, peaking at number 18 on United States Billboard Hot 100 chart dated August 8, 1998.

== Track listing ==
- CD Single
1. Nobody Does It Better (Radio Edit) (featuring Warren G) – 4:31
2. Nobody Does It Better (Album version) (featuring Warren G) – 4:31
3. Nobody Does It Better (Instrumental) – 4:31

== Charts ==
=== Weekly charts ===
Chart (1998)	Peak position
Germany (GfK)	71
US Billboard Hot 100	18
US Hot R&B/Hip-Hop Songs (Billboard)	18
US Rhythmic (Billboard)	29
