= Necessary Roughness (album) =

Studio album by the Lady of Rage
- Released: June 24, 1997
- Recorded: 1996–1997
- Studio: Can-Am (Tarzana, Los Angeles)
- Genres: West Coast hip-hop; hardcore hip-hop; gangsta rap
- Length: 60:53
- Labels: Death Row; Interscope; Universal
- Producers: Dat Nigga Daz; DJ Premier; Easy Mo Bee; Kenny Parker; the Lady of Rage; Reg Flair; Sean "Barney" Thomas

Singles from Necessary Roughness
- 1. "Sho' Shot" Released: 1997; 2. "Get with da Wickedness (Flow Like That)" Released: 1997

Necessary Roughness is the only studio album by American hip-hop artist the Lady of Rage. The album was released on June 24, 1997. Necessary Roughness was largely produced by Daz Dillinger, with contributions from Easy Mo Bee and DJ Premier. The album peaked at No. 32 on the Billboard 200 on July 12, 1997. Necessary Roughness was the last Death Row album to be distributed by Interscope Records.

== Critical reception ==
Professional ratings
Review scores
Source	Rating
AllMusic	3/5 stars
Los Angeles Times	3/4 stars
NME	5/10

The Los Angeles Times wrote that "Rage delivers her lyrics with gale force and knocks out her tracks with rabbit-punch viciousness."

== Track listing ==
Necessary Roughness track listing
No.	Title	Writer(s)	Producer(s)	Length
1.	"Riot (intro)"			2:44
2.	"Necessary Roughness"	The Lady of Rage	Easy Mo Bee	4:37
3.	"Big Bad Lady" (featuring 2Pac)	The Lady of Rage	Dat Nigga Daz	5:12
4.	"Sho Shot"	The Lady of Rage	Sean "Barney" Thomas	4:26
5.	"No Shorts"	Rage; Daz	Dat Nigga Daz	4:00
6.	"Get with da Wickedness (Flow Like That) [Remix]"	Rage; Daz	Dat Nigga Daz	5:05
7.	"Raw Deal"	The Lady of Rage	Dat Nigga Daz	5:25
8.	"Breakdown"	The Lady of Rage	Easy Mo Bee	4:17
9.	"Rough Rugged & Raw" (featuring Snoop Doggy Dogg and Dat Nigga Daz)	Rage; Daz; Snoop	Reg Flair	4:06
10.	"Super Supreme"	The Lady of Rage	Kenny Parker	4:10
11.	"Some Shit"	The Lady of Rage	DJ Premier	3:06
12.	"Microphone Pon Cok" (featuring Madd 1 (of A.O.D))	Rage; Madd 1 (of A.O.D); Edi Ameng	DJ Premier	4:14
13.	"Get with da Wickedness (Flow Like That)"	The Lady of Rage	The Lady of Rage	3:57
14.	"Confessions"	The Lady of Rage	Daz; Rage	5:34
Total length:				60:53

=== Leftover track ===
- "The Set Up" (featuring Heather B. & Nikki D) (produced by DJ Premier)
  - The song was confirmed as a diss song to rival Foxy Brown who previously made derogatory comments about Rage and Heather B. in a particular interview. The track however was subsequently deleted from the album's track listing. This would also be the second time Nikki D made a cameo in a Foxy Brown diss record, the first being Queen Latifah's controversial, "Name Callin' (Part 1)".

== Charts ==
Chart (1997)	Peak position
US Billboard 200	32
US Top R&B/Hip-Hop Albums (Billboard)	7

== See also ==
- 1997 in music
- List of albums
