= O.F.T.B. =

American hip hop group

- Also known as: Operation from the Bottom
- Origin: Watts, CA, U.S.
- Genre: Hip hop
- Years active: 1992–2013
- Labels: Big Beat; Death Row; Tha Payroll
- Past members: Flipside; Low M.B. Bust Stop

O.F.T.B. (an abbreviation of Operation from the Bottom) was an American hip hop group from the Watts district of Los Angeles, California. The group O.F.T.B. consisted of three founding actual gang members Kevin "Flipside" White, Sammy "Bust Stop" Williams, and Ronald "Low M.B." Watkins, who grew up in Nickerson Gardens Project, which is home to the notorious gang Bounty Hunter Bloods. They were signed to Big Beat Records where they released their debut album Straight Up Watts in 1992 with the hit single "Slangin' Dope".

== History ==
The trio, Flipside, Low M.B., and Bus Stop released Straight Up Watts album on the Atlantic-backed Big Beat Records in 1992. their first single, "Slangin' Dope", received heavy rotation on The Box, which was a local TV channel for Los Angeles that only played requested music videos. Under the guidance of DJ Quik and 2nd II None's manager "Greedy" Greg, the group was soon picked up by Death Row Records.

=== Death Row Records ===
O.F.T.B. appeared on the platinum-selling, Suge Knight / Dr. Dre-produced soundtrack for the 1994-film Above the Rim with a track titled "Crack Em" (produced by DJ Quik), on the cassette-exclusive track "Hot Ones" for the soundtrack of the 1994-film Murder Was The Case, on the track "Body and Soul" on the Gridlock'd soundtrack and on the track "Keep Your Eyez Open" from the Gang Related soundtrack.

=== With Tupac Shakur ===
Tupac Shakur worked with O.F.T.B. on several tracks such as "The Struggle Continuez", "Worldwide (Time After Time)" and the original version "Better Dayz". The remake of Better Dayz was released after the death of 2Pac on his multi-platinum double-album (Better Dayz). They made a tribute song dedicated to 2Pac and Yaki Kadafi called "Still A Mystery" featuring The Outlawz and Kurupt. 2Pac, also, mentioned them in his hit single "To Live And Die In L.A." from The Don Killuminati: The 7 Day Theory and on the outro of " Last one left" (LBC, OFTB, MOB...) In 2013, they digitally released Hostile Environment through Tha Payroll Entertainment.

== Flipside's death ==
On September 23, 2013, Kevin "Flipside" White and a woman were shot in the 1600 block of East 114th Street in Watts, California. Flipside was rushed to a hospital and died from multiple gunshot wounds. Ten minutes later, a member of the P Jay Crips, Markice "Chiccen" Brider, was also shot to death. Kevin Phillips, a known member of the Grape Street Watts Crips was charged with two counts of murder and one count of attempted murder. A funeral service for Kevin White was held at Macedonia Baptist Church in Watts. The funeral had over 700 people in attendance, which included family, friends, and fans. Kevin White was longtime friends with Big Wy, of Damu Ridas and The Relativez, and a mentor to Jay Rock.

== Discography ==
=== Studio albums ===
- 1992: Straight Up Watts
- 2007: Unearthed
- 2009: The Missing D.R. Files
- 2011: Damn Near Dead
- 2013: Hostile Environment

=== Singles & EPs ===
- 1992: "Slangin' Dope"
- 1992: "Gimme 'Nother Hit "
- 1994: "Hot One"
- 1994: "Crack 'Em"
- 1996: "Check Yo Hood"
- 1997: "Body And Soul"
- 1998: "Off The Ringer"
- 1998: "In Too Deep"

=== Compilations ===
- 1994: Above the Rim soundtrack (Various)
- 1994: Murder Was the Case soundtrack (Various)
- 1996: Christmas on Death Row (With Death Row Records)
- 1996: Gridlock'd soundtrack (Various)
- 1997: Gang Related soundtrack (Various)
- 1998: Return of the West
- 2007: Archives soundtrack (Various)
- 2009: The Ultimate Death Row Collection (Various)

== Videography ==
=== Music videos ===
Video
"Check Yo Hood"
"Crack Em"
"Piru Love"
"Hey Bounty Hunter"
"They Ain't Ready"
"I Trust Nobody"
"We Fed Up"
"Starvin For It"
"Body And Soul"
"Slangin' Dope"
"They Wont The Ghetto"

== See also ==
- Crime in Los Angeles
