= J-Flexx =

American rapper

- Born: James Anderson; October 24, 1968 (age 57); Dayton, Ohio, U.S.
- Genres: Hip hop
- Occupations: Rapper; producer
- Years active: 1994–present
- Labels: Death Row Records (1994–1997) Live Crime Records (2007)
- Website: J-Flexx on Myspace

J-Flexx is an American former rapper and producer of Death Row Records.

== Career ==
J-Flexx ghostwrote lyrics for Dr. Dre during his tenure at Death Row Records. The first song he co-wrote in that collaboration, "Natural Born Killaz", became a Top 40 hit for Dre and Ice Cube in 1994 (Murder Was the Case Soundtrack). J-Flexx's success continued when he wrote lyrics for Dre's part in "California Love," a duet with Tupac Shakur. J-Flexx also co-wrote "Keep Their Heads Ringin," the first single from Ice Cube's Friday (soundtrack) (which ultimately sold over two million units). He followed that success with "Been There, Done That," a single released from Dr. Dre Presents the Aftermath.

J. Flexx released a parody of the song "Been There Done That" titled "Who Been There Who Done That" for the Death Row Greatest Hits compilation. J. Flexx made two other appearances on the Gridlock'd soundtrack with the song "Lady Heroin" and on the Gang Related soundtrack with the song, "A Change To Come" and "Free Em All" with Tha Realest. He also produced the songs "Top Dogg Cindafella", "Curiosity" and "Things Your Man Won't Do" for the Chronic 2000.

On December 5, 2007, it was revealed that For The People Entertainment would be releasing Stayin' Alive a collection of many unreleased songs by J-Flexx from his time on Death Row Records. This album was confirmed to have featured guest spots from Danny Boy, Sam Sneed, Barney Rubble, The Lady of Rage and Dr. Dre.

== Discography ==
=== Songs ===
- "Who Been There, Who Done That" (from Death Row Greatest Hits) (1996)
- "Party 4 Da Homies" (from Christmas on Death Row) (1996)
- "Lady Heroin" (from Gridlock'd soundtrack) (1997)
- "Free'em All", "A Change to Come" (from Gang Related soundtrack) (1997)
