= Christmas on Death Row =

Christmas On Death Row

Compilation album by various artists
- Released: December 3, 1996
- Genre: Christmas music; gangsta rap; g-funk; soul
- Length: 1:11:46
- Label: Death Row; Interscope
- Producer: Suge Knight (exec.); Danny Boy; Dat Nigga Daz; Kevyn Lewis; Operation From The Bottom; Reggie Lamb; Roman Johnson; Sean "Barney" Thomas; Snoop Doggy Dogg

Various artists chronology
Death Row Greatest Hits (1996)	Christmas On Death Row (1996)	Gridlock'd (1997)

Singles from Christmas on Death Row
- 1. "Santa Claus Goes Straight To The Ghetto" Released: December 5, 1996

Professional ratings
Review scores
Source	Rating
AllMusic	2.5/5 stars

Christmas on Death Row is a Christmas compilation album by Death Row Records and Interscope Records on December 3, 1996. The album, Death Row's only Christmas-themed release, was made as a form of charity to the community.

Production was handled by Kevyn Lewis, Danny Boy, Sean "Barney" Thomas, Daz Dillinger, Operation From The Bottom, Reggie Lamb, Roman Johnson and Snoop Doggy Dogg, with Suge Knight serving as executive producer. It features contributions from Danny Boy, Guesss, Six Feet Deep, B.G.O.T.I., Nate Dogg, Tha Dogg Pound, 816, Bad Azz, Big Tray Deee, J-Flexx, Michel'le, O.F.T.B., Sean "Barney" Thomas and Snoop Dogg.

The album debuted at number 155 on the Billboard 200 and peaked at number 30 on the Top R&B/Hip-Hop Albums. A music video released for the single "Santa Claus Goes Straight to the Ghetto".

== Track listing ==
No.	Title	Writer(s)	Producer(s)	Length
1.	"Santa Claus Goes Straight To The Ghetto" (performed by Snoop Doggy Dogg, Dat Nigga Daz, Tray Deee, Bad Azz and Nate Dogg)	Calvin Broadus; Delmar Arnaud; Tracy Davis; Jamarr Stamps; Isaac Hayes	Snoop Doggy Dogg; Kevyn Lewis (co.)	5:50
2.	"The Christmas Song" (performed by Danny Boy)	Mel Tormé; Robert Wells	Kevyn Lewis; Roman Johnson; Danny Boy (co.)	4:20
3.	"I Wish" (performed by Tha Dogg Pound)	Arnaud; Ricardo Brown	Dat Nigga Daz; Kevyn Lewis (co.)	4:56
4.	"Silver Bells" (performed by Michel'le)	Ray Evans; Jay Livingston	Kevyn Lewis; Reggie Lamb	3:29
5.	"Peaceful Christmas" (performed by Danny Boy)	Kevyn Lewis; Daniel Steward	Kevyn Lewis; Danny Boy	4:38
6.	"Christmas in the Ghetto" (performed by O.F.T.B.)	Kevin White; Sammy Williams; Ronald Watkins	Operation From The Bottom	4:02
7.	"Silent Night" (performed by B.G.O.T.I., 6 Feet Deep and Guesss)	Franz Xaver Gruber; Joseph Mohr	Kevyn Lewis	5:49
8.	"Be Thankful" (performed by Nate Dogg)	Nathaniel Hale; Danny Means; Robert Smith	Sean "Barney" Thomas	5:11
9.	"On This Glorious Day" (performed by 816)	Damon Thomas; Rodney Day; Marlon Hatcher; Earnest Dickerson; Keith Murrell		5:44
10.	"Frosty the Snowman" (performed by 6 Feet Deep)	Steve Edward Nelson; Walter E. "Jack" Rollins	Kevyn Lewis	3:58
11.	"O Holy Night" (performed by B.G.O.T.I.)	John Sullivan Dwight	Kevyn Lewis	4:42
12.	"Party 4 Da Homies" (performed by Sean "Barney" Thomas and J-Flexx)	Sean Thomas	Sean "Barney" Thomas	4:37
13.	"White Christmas" (performed by Guesss)	Irving Berlin	Kevyn Lewis	2:32
14.	"This Christmas" (performed by Danny Boy)	Donny Hathaway; Nadine McKinnor	Kevyn Lewis; Danny Boy	3:57
15.	"Have Yourself a Merry Little Christmas" (performed by 6 Feet Deep)	Hugh Martin; Ralph Blane	Kevyn Lewis	3:24
16.	"Christmas Everyday" (performed by Guesss)	William Robinson, Jr.	Kevyn Lewis	4:37
Total length:				1:11:46

Sample credits

- Track 1 contains an interpolation of "Do Your Thing" written by Isaac Hayes
- Track 16 contains a sample from "Christmas Everyday" as recorded by Smokey Robinson

== Personnel ==
- Calvin "Snoop Dogg" Broadus – performer & producer (track 1)
- Delmar "Dat Nigga Daz" Arnaud – performer (tracks: 1, 3), producer (track 3)
- Nathaniel "Nate Dogg" Hale – performer (tracks: 1, 8)
- Tracy "Big Tray Deee" Davis – performer (track 1)
- Jamarr "Bad Azz" Stamps – performer (track 1)
- Daniel "Danny Boy" Steward – performer (tracks: 2, 5, 14), producer (tracks: 5, 14), co-producer (track 2)
- Ricardo "Kurupt" Brown – performer (track 3)
- Michel'le Toussant – performer (track 4)
- Operation From The Bottom – performers & producers (track 6)
- Six Feet Deep – performer (tracks: 7, 10, 15)
- Don Guesss – performer (tracks: 7, 13, 16)
- B.G.O.T.I. – performer (tracks: 7, 11)
- 816 – performers (track 8)
- Sean "Barney Rubble" Thomas – performer (track 12), producer (tracks: 8, 12)
- James "J-Flexx" Anderson – performer (track 12)
- Kevyn "Cavi" Lewis – producer (tracks: 2, 4, 5, 7, 10, 11, 13–16), co-producer (tracks: 1, 3), arrangement (tracks: 1, 4, 7, 10, 15), mixing (tracks: 1, 2, 4, 5, 7, 13–16), engineering (tracks: 2, 7)
- Roman Johnson – producer (track 2), arrangement (track 7)
- Reggie Lamb – producer (track 4), arrangement (tracks: 4, 7, 15)
- Dave Aron – mixing (tracks: 1, 2, 6, 8–10, 13, 16), engineering (tracks: 2, 3, 13, 16)
- Rick Clifford – engineering (tracks: 4, 5, 11, 14), mixing (tracks: 4, 5, 11, 12, 14)
- Michael Geiser – engineering (tracks: 6, 8)
- Lance Pierre – engineering (track 7)
- Conley Abrams – mixing (track 7), engineering (track 15)
- Matthew Quave – engineering (track 9, 13), mixing (track 13)
- Travis Smith – engineering (track 12)
- Marion Hugh "Suge" Knight Jr. – executive producer

== Charts ==
Chart (1996–97)	Peak position
US Billboard 200	155
US Top R&B/Hip-Hop Albums (Billboard)	30
