= Gridlock'd (soundtrack) =

Gridlock'd – The Soundtrack

Soundtrack album by various artists
- Released: January 28, 1997
- Recorded: 1996
- Genre: West Coast hip hop; gangsta rap; g-funk; R&B
- Length: 1:09:35
- Label: Death Row; Interscope
- Producer: Suge Knight (exec.); Dat Nigga Daz; Johnny "J"; L.T. Hutton; Soopafly; Damon Thomas; Sean "Barney" Thomas; Char Jones; Brian G.; Cody Chesnutt; Medusa; Keith Andes

Death Row Records chronology
Christmas on Death Row (1996)	Gridlock'd – The Soundtrack (1997)	Gang Related (1997)

Singles from Gridlock'd
- 1. "Wanted Dead or Alive" Released: January 1997; 2. "Body and Soul" Released: March 1997; 3. "It's Over Now" Released: May 17, 1997

Professional ratings
Review scores
Source	Rating
AllMusic	3/5 stars
USA Today	2.5/4 stars
Los Angeles Times	3/4 stars

Gridlock'd – The Soundtrack is the soundtrack to Vondie Curtis-Hall film Gridlock'd and was released on 28 January 1997 by Death Row Records and Interscope Records.

The track "Out the Moon (Boom, Boom, Boom)" was originally recorded for the LBC Crew debut album Haven't You Heard? (We Givin' Something Bacc To The Street), which was later shelved and the songs were cycled through other Death Row releases. The album had two chart running singles. "Lady Heroin" was originally going to be on Sam Sneed's unreleased album Street Scholars. This is both the second to last Death Row Soundtrack Album and second to last Death Row album to be distributed by Interscope, as later in the year they would drop Death Row from their label.

"It's Over Now" was 46th on the Hot R&B/Hip-Hop Singles & Tracks, which was Danny Boy's second chart single. "Wanted Dead or Alive" was 16th in the UK and was accompanied by a music video with Snoop alone as it was filmed after the death of 2Pac, so he is only present in archive footages from the motion picture. The album itself went to top the R&B album chart also on the first place.

== Commercial performance ==
Gridlock'd debuted at number one on both the US Billboard 200 and the US Top R&B/Hip-Hop Albums charts, selling 150,500 copies in its first week. The album was certified Gold on April 16, 1997.

== Track listing ==
No.	Title	Writer(s)	Producer(s)	Length
1.	"Wanted Dead or Alive" (2Pac and Snoop Doggy Dogg featuring Val Young)	2Pac, Snoop Doggy Dogg	Dat Nigga Daz	4:39
2.	"Sho Shot" (The Lady of Rage)	The Lady of Rage	Sean "Barney" Thomas	4:26
3.	"It's Over Now" (Danny Boy)	Babyface	Keith Andes	4:05
4.	"Don't Try to Play Me Homey" (Dat Niggaz Daz)	Dat Nigga Daz	Dat Nigga Daz	4:38
5.	"Never Had a Friend Like Me" (2Pac)	Shakur	Johnny "J"	4:26
6.	"Why" (Nate Dogg)	Nate Dogg	Dat Nigga Daz	5:13
7.	"Out the Moon (Boom, Boom, Boom)" (Snoop Doggy Dogg featuring 2Pac, LBC Crew, Tray Deee, and Soopafly)	Broadus Jr., Shakur	Snoop Doggy Dogg, L.T. Hutton, Soopafly	5:09
8.	"I Can't Get Enough" (Danny Boy)	Damon Thomas	Damon Thomas	5:10
9.	"Tonight It's On" (B.G.O.T.I.)		Char Jones	3:14
10.	"Off the Hook" (Snoop Doggy Dogg featuring Charlie Wilson, Val Young, James DeBarge)	Broadus Jr.	Dat Nigga Daz	5:37
11.	"Lady Heroin" (J-Flexx, The Lady of Rage)	J-Flexx, The Lady of Rage	Sean "Barney" Thomas	4:12
12.	"Will I Rize" (Storm featuring Val Young)	Donna Harkness	Char Jones	5:16
13.	"Body and Soul" (O.F.T.B. featuring Jewell)	T. Shakur	Brian G.	4:54
14.	"Life Is a Traffic Jam" (2Pac featuring Eight Mile Road)	T. Shakur	Medusa	4:24
15.	"Deliberation" (Anonymous featuring Cody Chesnutt)	Cody Chesnutt	Cody Chesnutt	4:12
Total length:				1:09:35

== Charts ==
=== Weekly charts ===
Chart (1997)	Peak position
US Billboard 200	1
US Top R&B/Hip-Hop Albums (Billboard)	1

== Certifications ==
Region	Certification	Certified units/sales
United States (RIAA)	Gold	500,000^{^}
^{^} Shipments figures based on certification alone.

== See also ==
- List of number-one albums of 1997 (U.S.)
- List of number-one R&B albums of 1997 (U.S.)
