= G-Funk Classics, Vol. 1 & 2 =

Studio album by Nate Dogg
- Released: July 21, 1998
- Recorded: 1995–1998
- Studio: Can-Am (Reseda, Calif.); Dogg Foundation (Calif.)
- Genre: West Coast hip-hop; R&B; G-funk; hip-hop soul
- Length: 133:24
- Label: Breakaway; Dogg Foundation
- Producer: Nate Dogg (also exec.); Soopafly; Daz Dillinger; Warren G; L.T. Hutton; Jimmy J; Johnny J; Kurupt; Teddy Riley; Sam Sneed; Snoop Dogg

Nate Dogg chronology
G-Funk Classics, Vol. 1 (1997)	G-Funk Classics, Vol. 1 & 2 (1998)	Music & Me (2001)

Singles from G-Funk Classics, Vol. 1 & 2
- 1. "Never Leave Me Alone" Released: October 22, 1996; 2. "These Days" Released: October 10, 1997; 3. "Nobody Does It Better" Released: June 23, 1998; 4. "I Don't Wanna Hurt No More/Just Another Day/She's Strange" Released: 1998

Professional ratings
Review scores
Source	Rating
AllMusic	2.5/5 stars
Rap Pages	link
BrainOfHipHop	8/10 stars
ProofMuzik	4/5 stars

G-Funk Classics, Vol. 1 & 2 is the debut studio album by American singer Nate Dogg. Vol. 1 of the album was originally released through Death Row Records on January 14, 1997, but was taken off the market a week after its release due to legal problems at Death Row Records. It was then rereleased as a two-volume set by Breakaway Entertainment on July 21, 1998. The first volume was recorded during his tenure at Death Row Records, while the second volume was recorded after. The album made it to number 58 on the Billboard 200 and number 20 on the Top R&B/Hip-Hop Albums. The album produced four singles, with two top 40 singles: "Never Leave Me Alone", which was released on October 22, 1996, through Death Row Records and peaked at number 33 on the Billboard Hot 100.

"Nobody Does It Better", which became his biggest hit as a solo artist, peaked at number 18 on the Hot 100; "These Days", released through Death Row Records; and "I Don't Wanna Hurt No More", released in 1998 through Breakaway. The song "These Days" was previously featured on the first disc of the soundtrack of the movie Gang Related, released in 1997 through Death Row Records, and the song was released as a 12-inch promo on the B-side on 2Pac's single "Lost Souls", also on the soundtrack. It also had a release in 1997 as a promo version through Death Row Records. The track listing of the original print included an error: "Crazy, Dangerous" was credited as featuring Big Syke. According to Butch Cassidy, the album sold around 33,000 copies in the first week.

== Background ==
The album was first advertised by Death Row Records four years prior to its release.

== Track listing ==
Disc one — Ghetto Preacher
No.	Title	Producer(s)	Length
1.	"Hardest Man in Town"	Teddy Riley	4:07
2.	"Intro to G-Funk (Comm. 1)"		2:13
3.	"G-Funk" (featuring Isaac Reese & Nanci Fletcher)	Snoop Doggy Dogg; L.T. Hutton	4:44
4.	"First We Pray" (featuring Kurupt & Isaac Reese)	Daz Dillinger	4:07
5.	"My World" (featuring Nanci Fletcher)	Daz Dillinger	4:21
6.	"Crazy, Dangerous" (featuring Six Feet Deep & Nanci Fletcher)	Johnny "J"	2:33
7.	"These Days" (featuring Daz Dillinger)	Nate Dogg	5:00
8.	"Bag o' Weed" (featuring Tray Deee)	Sam Sneed	4:34
9.	"Dirty Hoe's Draws" (featuring Big Chuck, L.T. Hutton, Salim & Val Young)	Snoop Doggy Dogg; L.T. Hutton	5:50
10.	"Scared of Love" (featuring Butch Cassidy)	Daz Dillinger	5:27
11.	"Me & My Homies" (featuring 2Pac & Nanci Fletcher)	Soopafly	4:09
12.	"Because I Got a Girl"	Sean "Barney" Thomas	3:49
13.	"My Money" (featuring The Lady of Rage & Nanci Fletcher)	Daz Dillinger	4:51
14.	"Never Leave Me Alone" (featuring Snoop Doggy Dogg & Val Young)	Kurupt	5:56
15.	"Last Prayer (Comm. 2)"		2:09
16.	"Where Are You Going?" (featuring Pamela Hale)	Nate Dogg	5:59

Disc Two — The Prodigal Son
No.	Title	Producer(s)	Length
1.	"Dedication"		0:07
2.	"Who's Playin' Games"	Nate Dogg	2:48
3.	"I Don't Wanna Hurt No More" (featuring Butch Cassidy)	Daz Dillinger	5:39
4.	"Just Another Day" (featuring Butch Cassidy & Val Young)	Nate Dogg	4:16
5.	"She's Strange" (featuring Barbara Wilson)	Daz Dillinger	4:31
6.	"Almost in Love" (featuring Isaac Reese)	Snoop Doggy Dogg; L.T. Hutton	4:14
7.	"No Matter Where I Go" (featuring Barbara Wilson)	Warren G	4:40
8.	"Stone Cold"	Soopafly	4:56
9.	"Friends" (performed by 213)	Warren G	4:58
10.	"Puppy Love" (featuring Daz Dillinger, Kurupt & Snoop Doggy Dogg)	Daz Dillinger	4:27
11.	"It's Goin' Down Tonight" (featuring Butch Cassidy & Isaac Reese)	Nate Dogg	4:26
12.	"Nobody Does It Better" (featuring Warren G)	Warren G	4:29
13.	"Sexy Girl" (featuring Big Syke)	Soopafly	4:05
14.	"Dogg Pound Gangstaville" (featuring Kurupt & Snoop Doggy Dogg)	Soopafly	3:48
15.	"Never Too Late" (featuring Barbara Wilson)	Soopafly	6:11

== Charts ==
Chart (1998)	Peak position
US Billboard 200	58
US Top R&B/Hip-Hop Albums (Billboard)	20
