= BODR =

Studio album by Snoop Dogg
- Released: February 11, 2022
- Genre: West Coast hip-hop; G-funk
- Length: 53:11
- Label: Death Row; Create
- Producer: Battlecat; Bink!; DJ Green Lantern; Don Cannon; Hi-Tek; Hit-Boy; Hollis; Nottz; Soopafly; Trevor Lawrence Jr.

Snoop Dogg chronology
Snoop Dogg Presents Algorithm (2021)	BODR (2022)	Metaverse : The NFT Drop, Vol. 1 (2022)

BODR (an abbreviation for Bacc On Death Row) is the nineteenth studio album by American rapper Snoop Dogg. It was released on February 11, 2022, through Death Row Records, as his third studio album released on the label following a 26-year lapse since Tha Doggfather (1996). The album was distributed by Create Music Group. It features guest appearances by Nas, T.I., Sleepy Brown, Nate Dogg, The Game, DaBaby, Uncle Murda, Wiz Khalifa and Lil Duval and production by Battlecat, Bink, DJ Green Lantern and Hit-Boy, among others.

Professional ratings
Review scores
Source	Rating
Allmusic	3.5/5 stars
HipHopDX	3.7/5
RapReviews	7.5/10

== Background ==
On August 23, 2019, American toy company Hasbro announced a $4 billion purchase of eOne, making them the owners of Death Row Records. In April 2021, Hasbro and Entertainment One announced it would sell-off eOne Music to The Blackstone Group. The acquisition was completed in June 2021.

On February 9, 2022, ahead of the release of BODR, Snoop Dogg announced that he would acquire the rights to the Death Row Records trademark from MNRK Music Group (the renamed eOne Music). The sale did not immediately include rights to the label's catalog, but it was reported that he was nearing a deal with MNRK to acquire the catalogs, which includes previous work from himself and other artists such as Dr. Dre, Tha Dogg Pound and 2Pac.

== Promotion ==
Two days after the album release, Snoop performed during the Super Bowl LVI halftime show alongside Dr. Dre, Mary J. Blige, Eminem, 50 Cent and Kendrick Lamar.

== Commercial performance ==
BODR debuted at number 104 on the US Billboard 200, becoming his 27th entry on the Billboard 200.

== Track listing ==
BODR track listing
No.	Title	Writer(s)	Producer(s)	Length
1.	"Still Smokin"	Calvin Broadus	DJ Battlecat	1:31
2.	"Gun Smoke"	Broadus	Hi-Tek	1:50
3.	"Coming Back" (featuring October London and Nefertitti Avani)	Broadus; October London; Nefertitti Avani	DJ Battlecat	3:31
4.	"Sandwich Bag"	Broadus	Bink	2:49
5.	"Conflicted" (featuring Nas)	Broadus; Nasir Jones	Hit-Boy	2:50
6.	"Daddy" (featuring Emo Trap)	Broadus; Shaquille Anthony Taylor	Hit-Boy	3:37
7.	"Doggystylin"	Broadus	Soopafly	2:53
8.	"Crip Ya Enthusiasm"	Broadus	DJ Green Lantern	3:39
9.	"Gotta Keep Pushing" (featuring T.I. and Sleepy Brown)	Broadus; Clifford Harris; Patrick Brown	Hollis	3:13
10.	"House I Built"	Broadus	Hit-Boy	3:10
11.	"Outside the Box" (featuring Nate Dogg)	Broadus; Nathaniel Hale	DJ Battlecat	2:22
12.	"Jerseys in the Rafters" (featuring The Game)	Broadus; Jayceon Taylor	Hit-Boy	2:29
13.	"Pop Pop" (featuring DaBaby)	Broadus; Jonathan Kirk	Trevor Lawrence Jr.	2:24
14.	"Catch a Vibe" (featuring HeyDeon)	Broadus; Deon Samuel Williams	Soopafly	3:14
15.	"It's in the Air" (featuring Uncle Murda and Jane Handcock)	Broadus; Lenny Grant; Jane Handcock	Nottz	3:12
16.	"We Don't Gotta Worry No More" (featuring Wiz Khalifa)	Broadus; Cameron Thomaz; Donald Cannon	Don Cannon; Lyle LeDuff	2:57
17.	"Get This Dick" (featuring Lil Duval and October London)	Broadus; Roland Powell; London; Cannon; Trevor Lawrence Jr.	Trevor Lawrence Jr.	3:30
18.	"Snoopy Don't Go" (featuring October London)	Broadus; London	DJ Battlecat	4:00
Total length:				53:11

== Charts ==
Chart performance for BODR
Chart (2022)	Peak position
Belgian Albums (Ultratop Flanders)	83
Canadian Albums (Billboard)	97
Dutch Albums (Album Top 100)	84
Swiss Albums (Schweizer Hitparade)	28
UK Album Downloads (OCC)	25
UK R&B Albums (OCC)	18
US Billboard 200	104
US Top Album Sales (Billboard)	63
US Independent Albums (Billboard)	14
