= Music & Me (Nate Dogg album) =

Studio album by Nate Dogg
- Released: December 4, 2001
- Recorded: 2000–01
- Genres: West Coast hip-hop; R&B; G-funk; hip-hop soul
- Length: 55:13
- Labels: Dogg Foundation; Elektra
- Producers: Rod McGrew (exec.); Sylvia Rhone (exec.); Jay Brown (co-exec.); Bink!; Dr. Dre; Megahertz; Jermaine Dupri; Mel-Man; Fredwreck Nassar; Damizza; Mike City; Bryan-Michael Cox; DJ Battlecat

Nate Dogg chronology
G-Funk Classics, Vol. 1 & 2 (1998)	Music & Me (2001)	Nate Dogg (2003)

Singles from Music & Me
- 1. "I Got Love" Released: October 13, 2001

Music & Me is the second and final studio album by American singer Nate Dogg, released by Dogg Foundation Records and Elektra Records on December 4, 2001. It received a fair amount of critical and commercial success upon release. Its popularity was led by the hit single "I Got Love" which appeared on the soundtrack to the Jason Statham film The Transporter. It features guest appearances from Dr. Dre, Xzibit, Kurupt, Fabolous, Ludacris, Pharoahe Monch, Snoop Dogg, Tha Eastsidaz, Jermaine Dupri, B.R.E.T.T., and Lil' Mo, and includes production by Bink!, Dr. Dre, Mel-Man, Battlecat, Damizza, Fredwreck Nassar, Mike City, Bryan Michael-Cox, and Megahertz. According to SoundScan, Music & Me has sold 400,000 copies to date.

== Critical reception ==
Professional ratings
Review scores
Source	Rating
AllMusic	3.5/5 stars
NME	(7/10)
HipHopDX	3.5/5 stars
RapReviews	6/10
USA Today	2.5/4 stars

Wise Q of HipHopDX gave praise to the production contributions by Dr. Dre and Mike City, and the guest lyrics from Xzibit and Ludacris, concluding that "There aren't many tracks that show Nate's enthusiasm dropping but the numerous features question whether the Dogg can hold it solo. Doesn't matter. Right now, the number one crooner from the West (not TQ) is back and this album displays Nate in all his pimp daddy vocalising glory." AllMusic's Jason Birchmeier also commended the production and featured artists for making the record have banging sound quality but felt the songwriting throughout lacked substance to avoid being "lyrically artless", concluding that "Nonetheless, Nate Dogg is vocally in fine form on Music & Me, an album that sounds good when it's playing, and fans will surely enjoy much of the album, which admittedly has been a long time coming, so long as they're not expecting anything deep or meaningful." Steve 'Flash' Juon of RapReviews gave note that the album shines when the solo tracks and featured songs follow the "Regulate" formula but said there was few of them to be found, concluding that "[F]or Nate Dogg fans his vocals are still quality and the beats are choicer than most, but hip-hop heads who expect rapper + Nate may actually find the reverse is less than they expect, rather than being equivalent."

== Track listing ==
No.	Title	Writer(s)	Producer(s)	Length
1.	"I Got Love"	Nathaniel Hale; Roosevelt Harrell	Bink	3:58
2.	"Backdoor"	Hale; Harrell	Bink	5:13
3.	"Keep It G.A.N.G.S.T.A." (featuring Lil' Mo and Xzibit)	Hale; Cynthia Loving; Dorsey Wesley; Alvin Joiner	Megahertz	4:05
4.	"I Pledge Allegiance (Intro)"	Hale; Melvin Bradford; Mike Elizondo; Troy Jamerson	Mel-Man	0:13
5.	"I Pledge Allegiance" (featuring Pharoahe Monch)	Hale; Bradford; Elizondo; Jamerson	Mel-Man	4:27
6.	"Your Woman Has Just Been Sighted (Ring the Alarm)" (featuring Jermaine Dupri)	Hale; Jermaine Dupri; Bryan-Michael Cox	Jermaine Dupri; Bryan-Michael Cox	4:01
7.	"Your Wife" (featuring Dr. Dre)	Hale; Andre Young; Elizondo; Royal Harbor	Dr. Dre; Mike Elizondo	3:39
8.	"Can't Nobody" (featuring Kurupt)	Hale; Wesley	Megahertz	5:22
9.	"Another Short Story"	Hale; Mike City	Mike City	4:15
10.	"Concrete Streets"	Hale; Kevin Gilliam	Battlecat	3:58
11.	"Real Pimp" (featuring Ludacris)	Hale; Harrell; Christopher Bridges	Bink	3:34
12.	"Ditty Dum Ditty Doo" (featuring Snoop Dogg & Tha Eastsidaz)	Hale; Farid Nassar; Tracy Davis; Keiwan Spillman; Calvin Broadus	Fredwreck	4:27
13.	"Music & Me"	Hale; Howard Hersh; Damion Young	Damizza	4:00
14.	"I Got Love (Remix)" (featuring Fabolous, B.R.E.T.T. and Kurupt)	Hale; Harrell; John Jackson; Brett Williams; Ricardo Brown	Bink	4:00
15.	"One Night Stand (Bonus Track)" (featuring Angie Martinez, Illo 77 and Simon Vegas)		Simon Vegas	4:22
16.	"I Got Love (Simon Vegas Remix) (Bonus Track)" (featuring Fabolous, B.R.E.T.T. and Kurupt)		Simon Vegas	4:01

- Bonus tracks only available in Special Edition

== Charts ==
=== Weekly charts ===
2001 chart performance for Music & Me
Chart (2001)	Peak position
French Albums (SNEP)	52
US Billboard 200	32
US Top R&B/Hip-Hop Albums (Billboard)	3

2023 chart performance for Music & Me
Chart (2023)	Peak position
German Albums (Offizielle Top 100)	46

=== Year-end charts ===
Chart (2002)	Position
Canadian R&B Albums (Nielsen SoundScan)	175
Canadian Rap Albums (Nielsen SoundScan)	88
US Top R&B/Hip-Hop Albums (Billboard)	60

== Singles chart positions ==
Year	Song	Chart positions			
Year	Song	Billboard Hot 100	Hot R&B/Hip-Hop Singles & Tracks	Hot Rap Singles	Rhythmic Top 40
2001	"I Got Love"	#48	#45	-	#33
