= Val Young =

Singer

- Born: United States
- Genres: R&B; soul; funk
- Years active: 1977–present
- Labels: Motown, Amherst Records

Val Young is an American singer.

== Career ==
Young was discovered by George Clinton, who hired her as a background vocalist in 1977 for The Brides of Funkenstein, one of the many acts in his Funkadelic stable. In 1980, she recorded and toured with Roy Ayers. Young became a background vocalist for The Gap Band the same year and was featured with the group on the funk hit "Oops Up Side Your Head". She recorded five albums with the group and also toured with them.

It was not until she met Rick James that she became popular as a solo artist. James promoted her as the "Black Marilyn Monroe", and brought Young to Berry Gordy, who signed her to Motown Records on James' recommendation. James produced her debut album Seduction, which was released in 1985, it included the singles "Mind Games" and the title track "Seduction", as well as "Piece of My Heart" and "If You Should Ever Be Lonely", which were successful follow-ups in 1986.

James ran into serious conflict with Motown over the status of his spin-off acts, and Young subsequently left the label signing to Amherst Records, a Buffalo, New York-based label, releasing her second album Private Conversations in 1987. Three tracks from this album were produced by James with the title being released as a single.

Young went on tour with Bobby Brown in 1988 after he released his Don't Be Cruel album, and she was in high demand for performing live and recording background vocals for several artists: Bobby Womack, Kurtis Blow, Dr. Dre, Sylk E Fyne, Wayman Tisdale, Snoop Dogg, Evelyn "Champagne" King, Yo-Yo, El DeBarge, Miki Howard, Gerald LeVert, Teena Marie, Tupac Shakur, MC Eiht, Jimmy Jam & Terry Lewis, Eddie Murphy, Teddy Riley, Michael Bivins of New Edition and many other artists.

Young appeared in the songs "To Live & Die in L.A.", "Black Jesus", "Teardrops & Closed Caskets", plus on the album Still I Rise, and the track "Never Forget", a tribute dedicated to Tupac Shakur by former Outlawz member Napoleon.

In 2009, she was featured as a background singer for Raphael Saadiq in his PBS televised concert Live from the Artists Den.

In 2013, Young sang backing vocals on Eddie Murphy and Snoop Lion's single "Red Light", she also appeared in the official music video. In 2014, Young began touring as the lead singer of Candice "Candi" Ghant's lineup of The Mary Jane Girls. In 2025, she was featured in the Netflix documentary Being Eddie.

== Discography ==
=== Studio albums ===
- Seduction (1985)
- Private Conversations (1987)

=== Singles ===
- "Mind Games"
- "Seduction"
- "If You Should Ever Be Lonely"
- "A Piece of My Heart"
- "Private Conversations"
- "Don't Make Me Wait"
- "Stop Doing Me Wrong"

=== Guest appearances ===
- 1988: "Don't Cha Wanna Be Loved" (from the Mixmasters album Mixmasters)
- 1990: "LovelyLittleLady" (from the Glenn Medeiros album Glenn Medeiros)
- 1991: "I Adore You" (from the Tone Lōc album Cool Hand Lōc)
- 1992: "I Want U 4 Me" (from the Big Bub album Comin' At Cha)
- 1994: "Situation: Grimm" and "Ask of You" (from the Epic Records Soundtrack Higher Learning)
- 1994: "The World In My Hands (We Are One)" (from the Snap! album Welcome to Tomorrow)
- 1995: "Mirror Mirror" (from the Smooth B album One Million Strong)
- 1995: "Neighborhoodsta Funk" (from the Poppa LQ album Your Entertainment, My Reality)
- 1995: "Smooth" (from Tha Dogg Pound album Dogg Food)
- 1996: "Never Leave Me Alone" (from the Nate Dogg single)
- 1996: "To Live & Die in L.A." (from the Makaveli album The Don Killuminati: The 7 Day Theory)
- 1997: "Dirty Hoe's Draws" (from the Nate Dogg album G-Funk Classics, Vol. 1: Ghetto Preacher)
- 1997: "Four Seasons" (from the Infinite Mass album Alwayz Somethang)
- 1997: "Hellrazor" (from the 2Pac album R U Still Down? (Remember Me))
- 1997: "Nowhere 2 Hide" (from the DJ Pooh album Bad Newz Travels Fast)
- 1997: "Will I Rize" (from the Death Row soundtrack Gridlock'd)
- 1998: "Choppin up That Paper" (from the Do or Die album Headz or Tailz)
- 1998: "In California" and "Only For U" (from the Daz Dillinger album Retaliation, Revenge and Get Back)
- 1998: "Just Another Day" (from the Nate Dogg album G-Funk Classics, Vol. 1 & 2)
- 1998: "Y Do Thugz Die" (from the Luniz album Lunitik Muzik)
- 1998: "C'est la Vie" and "Money" (from the Gonzoe album If I Live & Nothing Happens)
- 1998: "Change Gone Come" (from the Snoop Dogg album Smokefest Underground)
- 1999: "I Don't Want You No More" (from the TRU album Da Crime Family)
- 1999: "G-Spot" (from the Warren G album I Want It All)
- 1999: "Thicker than Water" (from the MC Eiht album Section 8)
- 1999: "Black Jesuz", "The Good Die Young" and "Teardrops and Closed Caskets" (from the 2Pac + Outlawz album Still I Rise)
- 2000: "Black Rain" and "When I Go" (from the Outlawz album Ride wit Us or Collide wit Us)
- 2000: "The Truth" and "Hit Me on the Hip" (from the Richie Rich album The Game)
- 2000: "West Coast Lowrider" (from the Frost album That Was Then, This Is Now, Vol. 2)
- 2001: "Personal Business" (from the Bad Azz album Personal Business)
- 2002: "Noble Justice" (from the Young Noble album Noble Justice)
- 2003: "Do My Thang" (from the Yukmouth album Godzilla)
- 2003: "What's A Pimp?" and "Don't Act Like That" (from the Too Short album Married to the Game)
- 2004: "Makavelli Never Lied" (from the Teena Marie album La Doña)
- 2004: "Never Forget" (from the Mob Life Records compilation On the Grind)
- 2005: "California" (from the RBX album The Shining)
- 2005: "One Night" (from the Jay Tee album The Thousandaire)
- 2006: "Hollywood" and "Don't Need None" (from the Muszamil album Reparation Is Due)
- 2006 "FREE" (from the DUB B album "The SeaReal Way)
- 2010 "Got To Be SeaReal" (from the DUB B album "Fruition)

Unreleased

- "Street Life" (Unreleased) (Snoop Dogg featuring 2Pac & Prince Ital Joe)
- "Let Em Have It" (Unreleased versions) (2Pac featuring Storm)

== See also ==
- List of number-one dance hits (United States)
- List of artists who reached number one on the US Dance chart
