= Gang Related – The Soundtrack =

Soundtrack album by various artists
- Released: October 7, 1997
- Recorded: 1994 ("Life's So Hard", verses 1-3); Remaining tracks 1996–1997
- Genre: West Coast hip hop; gangsta rap; g-funk
- Length: 1:54:33
- Label: Death Row; Priority
- Producer: Suge Knight (exec.); Daz Dillinger; QDIII; 2Pac; Sean "Barney" Thomas; Arthur Griffith; Binky Mack; Brian G; Bud'da; Carl "Butch" Small; Carlas Closson; Chris Jackson; Dwayne Armstrong; Les Pierce; Nate Dogg; Reginald Moore; Stretch; Tommy D. Daugherty; Wy

Death Row Records chronology
Gridlock'd (1997)	Gang Related – The Soundtrack (1997)	Suge Knight Represents: Chronic 2000 (1999)

Singles from Gang Related – The Soundtrack
- 1. "Way Too Major" Released: September 1997; 2. "These Days" Released: November 1997; 3. "Made Niggaz" Released: December 1997

Gang Related – The Soundtrack is a soundtrack for the Jim Kouf's 1997 crime film Gang Related. It was released on October 7, 1997, through Death Row Records, making it their first album to be distributed by Priority Records after Interscope Records dropped Death Row from their label. Production was handled by several record producers, including Daz Dillinger, Quincy Jones III, Binky Mack and Bud'da among others. The album features contributions by the likes of CJ Mac, J-Flexx, Tha Realest, members of Dogg Pound, Outlawz, Westside Connection, four songs by the supporting actor Tupac Shakur, and also marked the first national rap debut of Kansas City rapper Tech N9ne. The soundtrack peaked at #2 on the Billboard 200 albums chart in the US behind The Velvet Rope by Janet Jackson, and was eventually certified 2× Platinum by the Recording Industry Association of America.

This soundtrack along with 3 others (Above the Rim, Murder Was the Case & Gridlock'd) released on Death Row is packaged in a 4-disc set called The Death Row Archives [The Soundtracks].

== Track listing ==
Disc 1
No.	Title	Writer(s)	Producer(s)	Length
1.	"Way Too Major" (Daz Dillinger featuring Tray Deee)	D. Arnaud; T. Davis	Daz Dillinger	5:27
2.	"Life's So Hard" (2Pac)	T. Shakur; D. Arnaud	Daz Dillinger	5:41
3.	"Greed" (Ice Cube)	O. Jackson; S. Anderson	Bud'da	4:30
4.	"Get Yo Bang On" (Mack 10 featuring AllFrumThaI)	D. Rolison; M. Moore; R. Garner	Binky Mack	3:07
5.	"These Days" (Nate Dogg featuring Daz Dillinger)	N. Hale; D. Arnaud	Nate Dogg	4:59
6.	"Mash for Our Dreams" (Storm featuring Young Noble and Daz Dillinger)	D. Hunter; R. Cooper III; D. Arnaud	Daz Dillinger	4:48
7.	"Free'em All" (J-Flexx featuring Tenkamenin)	J. Anderson; J. Jones; Q. Jones III	QDIII	5:40
8.	"Starin' Through My Rear View" (2Pac featuring Outlawz)	T. Shakur; M. Greenidge; Y. Fula; T. Wrice; P. Collins	2Pac; Tyrone Wrice (co.)	5:12
9.	"Devotion" (Paradise)	Paradise; R. Williams; L. Pierce; M. White; P. Baily	Les "Dr. Smoke" Pierce	4:16
10.	"I Can't Fix It" (Jackers)	C. Jackson	Chris Jackson; Arthur Griffith	4:36
11.	"Questions" (Tech N9ne)	A. Yates; Q. Jones III	QDIII	5:08
12.	"Hollywood Bank Robbery" (Tha Gang featuring Snoop Doggy Dogg and Kurupt)	D. Arnaud; T. Davis; C. Broadus Jr.; R. Brown	Daz Dillinger	4:31
Total length:				57:52

Disc 2
No.	Title	Writer(s)	Producer(s)	Length
1.	"Made Niggaz" (2Pac featuring Outlawz)	T. Shakur; Outlawz	2Pac; Johnny "J" (co.)	5:02
2.	"Loc'd Out Hood" (Kurupt)	R. Brown	Daz Dillinger	4:31
3.	"Gang Related" (WC, CJ Mac, Daz Dillinger and Tray Deee)	T. Davis; B. Ross; W. Calhoun Jr.; D. Arnaud	Daz Dillinger	4:32
4.	"Keep Your Eyes Open" (O.F.T.B.)	Operation From The Bottom	Brian G; O.F.T.B. (co.)	5:23
5.	"Lady" (6 Feet featuring Storm)	R. Moore; 6 Feet Deep	Regi Devell	4:15
6.	"Take a Nigga Like Me" (Young Soldierz)	S. Doby; W. Dillon	Stretch; Wy	5:19
7.	"What Have You Done?" (B.G.O.T.I.)	Tenaia "Oobie" Sanders, D. Armstrong	Dwayne Armstrong	4:49
8.	"What's Ya Fantasy" (Outlawz and Daz Dillinger)	D. Hunter; R. Cooper III; D. Arnaud; M. Beale	Daz Dillinger	5:32
9.	"A Change to Come" (J-Flexx featuring Tenkamenin, Bahamadia, Kool & the Gang and Con Funk Shun)	S. Thomas; K. Chatman; F. Pilate; K. Fuller; J. Anderson; J. Jones	Sean "Barney" Thomas	4:22
10.	"Freak Somethin'" (Roland)	R. Williams; C. Small	Carl "Butch" Small; Tommy D. Daugherty	4:46
11.	"Feelin' a Good Thang" (2DV)	D. Irons; D. Gerdine; C. Closson	Carlas Closson; 2DV (co.)	3:24
12.	"Lost Souls" (2Pac featuring Outlawz)	T. Shakur; M. Murphy; D. Frank	QDIII; Sean "Barney" Thomas	4:43
Total length:				57:00

== Charts ==
=== Weekly charts ===
Chart (1997)	Peak position
US Billboard 200	2
US Top R&B/Hip-Hop Albums (Billboard)	1

== Certifications ==
Region	Certification	Certified units/sales
United States (RIAA)	2× Platinum	2,000,000^{^}
^{^} Shipments figures based on certification alone.

== See also ==
- List of number-one R&B albums of 1997 (U.S.)
