= Death Row Records =

American record label

- Parent company: Estate of Snoop Dogg (owner)
- Founded: 1991; 35 years ago (original); February 9, 2022; 4 years ago (revival)
- Founder: The D.O.C.; Suge Knight; Dr. Dre; Dick Griffey
- Status: Active
- Distributors: Interscope (1992–1997); Priority (1992–2003); Koch (2003–2007); AMPED Distribution (physical, 2021–2022); gamma. (2023–present); Create (digital)
- Genre: Hip-hop; R&B
- Country of origin: United States
- Location: 8200 Wilshire Boulevard, Beverly Hills, California, 90011, U.S.
- Official website: deathrowrecords.com

Death Row Records is an American record label that was founded in 1991 by The D.O.C., Suge Knight, Dr. Dre, and Dick Griffey. The label became a sensation by releasing multi-platinum hip-hop albums by West Coast-based artists such as Dr. Dre (The Chronic), Snoop Dogg (Doggystyle, Tha Doggfather) and 2Pac (All Eyez on Me, The Don Killuminati: The 7 Day Theory) during the 1990s. At its peak, Death Row made over US $100 million annually.

By the late 1990s, the label began to decline following the death of its star artist 2Pac, the imprisonment of Suge Knight, and the departures of Dr. Dre and Snoop Dogg. Death Row Records became embroiled in controversies, lawsuits, links to organized crime and extreme violence by its artists and associates, despite enjoying financial success.

Death Row Records filed for bankruptcy in 2006, It was then auctioned to WIDEawake Entertainment for $18 million on January 15, 2009. The owner of WIDEawake went bankrupt in 2012; the label was sold to Entertainment One, and it then became a division of Hasbro until April 2021, when eOne Music was sold to the Blackstone Group. Snoop Dogg bought Death Row from MNRK Music Group in February 2022, intending to revive the label.

== History ==
=== 1987–1992: Origins and the first generation ===
In 1987, N.W.A's Dr. Dre signed to Eazy-E's Ruthless Records. As head of production at the label, Dr. Dre produced a large number of Ruthless projects, many of them successful; feeling the pressures of having to produce so many acts and feeling he was underpaid, Dr. Dre became frustrated with Ruthless. After the departure of Ice Cube in 1989 over financial disagreements with Jerry Heller, Suge Knight and the D.O.C. went over the books with a lawyer. Convinced that Jerry Heller and Eazy-E were dishonest, they approached Dr. Dre about forming a label with them, away from Heller and Eazy-E. Allegedly using strong-arm tactics, Suge Knight was able to procure contracts from Eazy-E for the D.O.C., Dr. Dre, Jewell, and Michel'le.

Dr. Dre and Suge Knight along with partners the D.O.C. and Dick Griffey began the process of starting a record label and music partnership in anticipation of Dr. Dre's departure from Ruthless. Although the name of their new music venture was originally called Future Shock, both the D.O.C and Suge Knight's business associate Michael "Harry-O" Harris have claimed to have suggested changing the name of the new label to 'Def Row' (a play on Def Jam), but rights to the name were already owned by the Unknown DJ, who also happened to be one of Dre's former music associates in the 1980s. Unknown stated in an interview that he created the name "Def Row" for a potential deal to start another record label under Morgan Creek. However he later sold the naming rights to Dr. Dre and his partners in July 1991 and by 1992 the name changed to its eventual title of Death Row Records. Knight approached Michael "Harry-O" Harris, a businessman imprisoned on drug and attempted murder charges. Through David Kenner, an attorney handling Harris's appeal, Harry-O set up Godfather Entertainment, a parent company for the newly christened Death Row.

Knight approached Vanilla Ice (Robert Van Winkle), using management connections with Mario "Chocolate" Johnson, claiming Johnson had produced and co-written the song "Ice Ice Baby", and had not received royalties for it. After consulting with Alex Roberts, Knight and two bodyguards arrived at The Palm in West Hollywood, Los Angeles, California, where Van Winkle was eating. After shoving Van Winkle's bodyguards aside, Knight sat down in front of Van Winkle, staring at him before asking "How you doin'?" Similar incidents were repeated on several occasions, including alleged attempts to lure Vanilla Ice into a van filled with Bloods and Crips, before Knight showed up at Vanilla Ice's hotel suite on the 15th floor of the Bel Age Hotel, accompanied by Johnson and a member of the Los Angeles Raiders. According to Vanilla Ice, Knight took him out on the balcony by himself, and implied he would throw Vanilla Ice off unless he signed the rights to the song over to Knight; Van Winkle's money helped fund Death Row. Death Row was initially located at the intersection of Westwood Blvd and Wilshire Blvd, later to be relocated to the intersection of Wilshire Blvd. and San Vicente Blvd.

=== 1992–1995: The Chronic, Doggystyle, and other releases ===
With the help of Kenner, Knight began signing young, inner-city California-based artists. Through Suge's connection with Dick Griffey, Griffey arranged for Death Row to contribute to the soundtrack for the 1992 film, Deep Cover. The single, "Deep Cover", established Dr. Dre as a solo artist and a young Snoop Doggy Dogg as his protégé. Soon after, Dr. Dre discovered and brought in Virginia artist The Lady of Rage, as well as her step-brother Warren G. Snoop Doggy Dogg brought in his friend Kurupt and his cousins Dat Nigga Daz, Nate Dogg, and RBX. The D.O.C. was retained for songwriting. With this stable of artists, work commenced on The Chronic, Dr. Dre's debut studio album.

In 1992, Jimmy Iovine's Interscope Records negotiated a $10-million deal with Dr. Dre and Marion "Suge" Knight to finance and distribute Death Row. The meeting and negotiations were initiated by John McClain, who met Dre when he was recording his The Chronic. Original plans had called for the album to be released through Sony, but Sony passed on The Chronic due to Death Row's controversial nature and Dr. Dre's contractual status. After hearing the album, Iovine agreed to release it, although doing so required a complicated distribution agreement with Priority Records, Dre's label as a member of N.W.A. The Chronic was released in December 1992. The album, which was released on December 15 and peaked at number 3 on the Billboard Top 200, went on to sell 5.7 million records worldwide, popularizing the distinctive style of G-Funk. The Death Row roster consisted of Dre, Snoop, Daz, Kurupt, Nate Dogg, the Lady of Rage, the D.O.C., Jewell, RBX, and many more.

After Snoop Dogg found solo success through his features on The Chronic, Dre began producing Snoop Dogg's debut album Doggystyle throughout 1993. Snoop's debut was released on November 23, 1993 due to public demand and high pressure from retailers. Though unfinished, it outperformed The Chronic at Quadruple Platinum, and garnered similarly glowing reviews. Soon after the release of the album, Snoop Dogg was charged with murder, fueling the debate that politicians C. Delores Tucker and vice presidential candidate Dan Quayle sparked by criticizing gangsta rap for being against American values, degrading to black women, and encouraging violence towards police officers. Throughout 1994, Death Row Records released the soundtracks Above the Rim and Murder Was the Case.

On November 22, 1994, at the offices of The Brotherhood Crusade in Los Angeles, Suge Knight and several artists from Death Row such as Tha Dogg Pound as well as DJ Quik distributed nearly 2,000 turkeys to the public. Death Row also donated turkeys the following year as well. On March 13, 1995, Death Row Records hosted a private party at the El Rey Theatre, where Kelly Jamerson, a Rolling 60's Crip, was severely beaten by several Bloods, who were allegedly from Suge Knight's inner circle. As a result of his injuries, Jamerson died the next day at the Cedars-Sinai Medical Center.

=== 1995–1996: Signing 2Pac, Bad Boy Records feud, Dr. Dre's departure ===
After an August visit to see 2Pac at Clinton Correctional Facility in northern New York state, Suge traveled southward to New York City to join Death Row's entourage to the 2nd Annual Source Awards ceremony. Already reputed for strongarm tactics on the Los Angeles rap scene, after giving a brief comment of support for Shakur, Suge used his brief stage time mainly to disparage Sean "Puff Daddy" Combs, CEO of Bad Boy Records, the label then leading New York rap scene. Knight criticized Combs for his habit of ad-libbing on his artists' music as well as making numerous cameo appearances in his artists' music videos. Suge then invited artists seeking the spotlight for themselves to join Death Row. Eventually, Puff recalled that to preempt severe retaliation from his Bad Boy crew, he had promptly confronted Suge, whose reply—that he had meant Jermaine Dupri, of So So Def Recordings, in Atlanta—was politic enough to deescalate the conflict.

Still, among the fans, the previously diffuse rivalry between America's two mainstream rap scenes had instantly flared already. And while in New York, Suge visited Uptown Records, where Puff, under its founder Andre Harrell, had started in the music business through an internship. Apparently without paying Uptown, Suge obtained the releases of Puff's prime Uptown recruits Jodeci, its producer DeVante Swing, and Mary J. Blige, all then signing with Suge's management company. On September 23, 1995, at Jermaine Dupri's birthday party at the Platinum House nightclub in Atlanta, Georgia, Bad Boy's entourage entered a heated dispute with Suge and Suge's friend Jai Hassan-Jamal "Big Jake" Robles, a Campanella Park Piru Bloods gang member and Death Row bodyguard. According to eyewitnesses, including a Fulton County sheriff working there as a nightclub bouncer, Puff had heatedly disputed with Suge inside the club. Several minutes later, outside the club, Puff's childhood friend and own bodyguard, Anthony "Wolf" Jones was involved in a heated altercation with others that ultimately led to Robles being fatally shot while entering a Limousine. The attorneys of Puff and Jones both denied any involvement by their clients, while Puff's lawyer added that Puff had not even been with his bodyguard that night. Over 20 years later, the case remains officially unresolved, and Jones himself was fatally shot in Atlanta in November 2003 during an altercation with the Black Mafia Family. Yet immediately and persistently, Suge blamed Puff, cementing the enmity between the two bosses, whose two record labels dominated the rap genre's two mainstream centers.

In October 1995, Knight visited 2Pac in prison again and posted $1.4 million bond. 2Pac began work on his Death Row album, kicking off his tenure by insulting the Notorious B.I.G., Junior M.A.F.I.A. and Puff Daddy (the founder of Bad Boy Records), whom he accused of setting him up to be robbed and shot at Quad Studios on November 30, 1994, as well as Mobb Deep, Jay-Z, A Tribe Called Quest, De La Soul, Jimmy Henchman, the Fugees and Nas. Tha Dogg Pound's debut album, Dogg Food, continued the label's streak of commercial successes; its members – rappers Kurupt and Daz Dillinger – then joined Snoop in ridiculing New York rappers with their single "New York, New York", featuring Snoop Dogg. The video, set in New York City, New York, was also heightened when the set was fired upon in a drive-by. After the shooting, Snoop Dogg and Tha Dogg Pound filmed scenes kicking down a building in New York. The single provoked a response called '"L.A., L.A." by East Coast rappers Capone-N-Noreaga, Tragedy Khadafi, and Mobb Deep.

Another report was that Sam Sneed was beaten in one of the label's meetings by a group of Death Row affiliates, led by Suge Knight and 2Pac. According to Daz Dillinger, the reason this happened was that Sam Sneed had too many East Coast rappers in his "Lady Heroin" music video. Disillusioned with the direction of Death Row, artists RBX and the D.O.C. chose to leave, after which Suge Knight exercised tighter control over the rest of the roster. Dogg Food was not produced by Dr. Dre but was mixed by Dr. Dre, a further testament to Dre's dwindling involvement with Death Row. Dr. Dre also grew tired of Knight's violence within the label, although he contributed toward two tracks on 2Pac's All Eyez on Me. The rest of the tracks on the album, however, were mostly produced by Daz Dillinger and Johnny J, despite Dr. Dre being nominally titled as Executive Producer. 2Pac's behavior reportedly became erratic as he continued his verbal wars with the Notorious B.I.G., Bad Boy Records, Puff Daddy, and Mobb Deep, including many violent confrontations with many of those rappers at some points. On March 22, 1996, due to the infighting, Dr. Dre officially left Death Row Records to found Aftermath, which provoked 2Pac to turn against Dr. Dre.

Suge Knight's relationship with MC Hammer dates back to 1988. With the success of Hammer's 1994 album, The Funky Headhunter, Hammer signed with Death Row in 1995, along with his close friend, Tupac. The label did not release the album of M.C. Hammer's music (titled Too Tight), although he did release versions of some tracks on his next album. However, Hammer did record tracks with Shakur and others, most notably the song "Too Late Playa" (along with Big Daddy Kane and Danny Boy). After the death of Tupac in 1996, MC Hammer left the label.

=== 1996–2001: Tupac Shakur's murder, Suge Knight's incarceration, and decline ===
Formerly a united front of artists, Death Row's roster fractured into separate camps. Daz, now head producer, worked on Snoop Dogg's second album Tha Doggfather, which featured Bad Azz and Techniec of the LBC Crew, Warren G and Nate Dogg of his group 213 and Tha Dogg Pound. 2Pac, at this point now going by the alias Makaveli, shut himself into the studio with Hurt-M-Badd and Big "D", crafting The Don Killuminati: The 7 Day Theory - unlike All Eyez on Me, it was devoid of high-profile Death Row guest appearances, instead showcasing Outlawz and Bad Azz, and had a much darker tone. Suge Knight was now barely reachable by his staff, and employees were assaulted as punishment for not following orders.

In New York City for the MTV Video Music Awards, 2Pac was interviewed on Death Row East, an East Coast subsidiary branch of Death Row. It was also during this time that Alex Roberts and David Kenner had been seen at Suge Knight's Vegas Club 662, in discussion about the possibility of having Roberts' New York underworld connections help pave the way for Death Row East. The record label was supposed to be run by Eric B. and Big D with Craig Mack being the first artist signed to the label. On September 7, 1996, Suge Knight and 2Pac were caught on surveillance camera at the MGM Grand Hotel in Las Vegas attacking gang member Orlando Anderson, who was a member of the South Side Compton Crips street gang. Later that night, 2Pac was shot four times in a drive-by shooting in the front seat of Suge Knight's BMW 750iL waiting at a red traffic light at crossroads; en route to Knight's Las Vegas Club 662; despite living six days in critical condition, 2Pac died on September 13, 1996. He was 25 years old.

Death Row quickly released 2Pac's The Don Killuminati: 7 Day Theory in November 1996, just one week before Snoop Dogg's Tha Doggfather, which both achieved multi-Platinum sales. The following months, Death Row released the compilation albums, Death Row Greatest Hits, and Christmas on Death Row, and soundtrack albums for the films, Gridlock'd, and Gang Related. Nate Dogg's album, G-Funk Classics, Vol. 1 was supposed to be released on January 14, 1997, but got shelved due to issues at Death Row Records, despite getting released independently as a double disc the following year. On February 28, Suge Knight was convicted of probation violation and sentenced to nine years in prison, causing Interscope to drop their distribution deal with the label.

Suge Knight's control over the label diminished, as Nate Dogg was able to leave, followed by Snoop Dogg and Kurupt. The Lady of Rage left after the release of her solo album Necessary Roughness to pursue an acting career, so did Michel'le with Hung Jury. Daz Dillinger departed in 1999 after the release of his debut album Retaliation, Revenge and Get Back, but produced for Big C-Style, and he later formed D.P.G. Recordz. During Knight's incarceration, Death Row released Suge Knight Represents: Chronic 2000 and Too Gangsta for Radio, which both received negative reviews. Both albums had the label's new signees, Tha Realest and YGD Tha Top Dogg, who were criticized for imitating the styles, looks, and vocals of 2Pac and Snoop Dogg. Also, Dead Man Walkin', a Snoop Dogg compilation of unreleased recordings, was released without his authorization.

=== 2001–2005: Knight's release, return to prison, second generation ===
Maintaining artistic control from behind bars, Suge Knight launched smear campaigns against his former artists, most notably Snoop Dogg. Death threats were exchanged, and Snoop Dogg responded by publicly dissing Suge Knight, leaving the label, and later releasing diss track "Pimp Slapp'd", garnering critical acclaim from music magazine Complex. He signed new talent, including Crooked I. On August 6, 2001, Suge Knight was released from prison. Just three days later, it was reported by The Los Angeles Times that Daz Dillinger filed a lawsuit against Death Row and Suge Knight, alleging he was defrauded of over $1 million in royalties and other payments. The lawsuit accused Death Row of exploiting Daz, withholding payments, and coercing him into signing revised contracts in 1997 and 1998 under threats and without an independent audit. Daz stated he received only a $75,000 advance under the 1998 agreement and disputed whether royalties from earlier contracts remained owed. The case also alleged that Death Row failed to cover agreed-upon recording expenses.

Despite bad blood, Kurupt would again sign with Suge Knight in exchange for the position of Vice President, which sparked a feud between himself and Daz Dillinger and Snoop Dogg. He began work on Against tha Grain; his verbal feud with his former partners continued from 2002 to 2005. The same year, Knight decided to enter the UK market with Death Row Records operating as an independent record label in conjunction with the Ritz Music Group, a company known for its success with Irish country music artists such as Daniel O'Donnell The joint-venture signed British R&B singer Mark Morrison to a five-year deal with Death Row Records UK, with a single called "Thank God It's Friday" and an album called Innocent Man scheduled for a 2002 release. However, the single did not chart in the UK and the album ended up being released by footballer Kevin Campbell's record label 2 Wikid, before being re-issued in 2006 by Mona Records.

Left Eye, member of the R&B girl group TLC signed with Death Row after finishing her solo deal with Arista who released her first album Supernova in 2001. At this time, Death Row changed into Tha Row Records. Lopes joined to record a second solo album under the pseudonym N.I.N.A. (New Identity Not Applicable), while also working on TLC's new album 3D. N.I.N.A. was canceled after her death in April 2002. The album was leaked online in 2011.

After promoting his new talent from prison, directing a campaign against his former artists and exacerbating the conflict between Daz Dillinger, Snoop Dogg and Kurupt, Suge had still yet to release any albums by his new artists. After Kurupt's second departure, Against tha Grain was released; soon after, citing dissatisfaction with serving five years on the label and seeing no release, Rapper Crooked I left Death Row, eventually filing a gag order on Knight to prevent him from interfering with him finding a new deal. Petey Pablo, who had signed in 2005 and started the never-released album Same Eyez on Me, left along with rapper Tha Realest in 2006.

=== 2006–2022: Bankruptcy and ownership changes ===
On April 4, 2006, both Death Row Records and Suge Knight simultaneously filed for Chapter 11 bankruptcy protection following the appointment of a Receiver to acquire and auction off assets of both Death Row Records and Suge Knight in the civil case filed by Lydia Harris. Among those listed as unsecured creditors to Death Row include the Harrises ($107 million), the Internal Revenue Service ($6.9 million), Koch Records ($3.4 million), Interscope Records ($2.5 million) and a number of artists previously signed to the label. Suge Knight eventually lost control of Death Row Records and his personal assets when Chapter 11 Trustees took over both cases.

On January 15, 2009, Death Row Records was successfully auctioned for $18 million to Ontario-based WIDEawake Entertainment Group that was founded in 2006 by Lara Lavi, with financing from New Solutions Financial Corporation. On January 25, 2009, a public auction was held for everything found in Death Row's office after it filed for bankruptcy. Of note was the Death Row electric chair which went for US$2,500. Lavi was removed from WIDEawake and Robert Thompson-So of New Solutions took over day-to-day operations. Lavi then sued her former company WIDEawake, along with New Solutions and Thompson-So in New York County Court on November 19, 2009.

WIDEawake issued previously unreleased material from such artists as Kurupt, Danny Boy, Crooked I, Sam Sneed, LBC Crew, Jewell and O.F.T.B. Dr. Dre's, The Chronic Re-Lit was released on September 1, 2009 and contained The Chronic remastered with seven unreleased songs featuring Snoop Dogg, CPO, Kurupt, Jewell, and a bonus DVD containing a Dr. Dre interview, a Dr. Dre and Snoop Dogg mini movie, and television commercials for the original The Chronic. The album also contained a scene from an unfinished feature film entitled, SAIGON, CA, which was to launch WIDEawake's film studio. Death Row The Lost Sessions Vol 1 by Snoop Dogg was released October 13, 2009 and contained 15 previously unreleased tracks, including some produced by Dr. Dre. Death Row: The Ultimate Collection was released on November 24 and was a special box set containing three audio CDs (one greatest hits disc and two discs of unreleased content), one DVD of music videos including the unreleased Dr. Dre music video "Puffin' On Blunts".

On December 5, 2012, Jonathan Hay, a former Death Row publicist reported through HipHopDX that New Solutions Financial Corporation, the Canadian company that owned WIDEawake Death Row, had gone bankrupt and sold both the label and catalog to a publicly held company in a deal that would be closed on December 10. In 2013, E1 Music, formerly Koch Records, the distributor for Death Row in the 2000s, purchased the rights to the Death Row catalog. New Solutions Financial Corporation was eventually exposed as an alleged Ponzi scheme. On August 23, 2019, American toy company Hasbro announced a $4 billion purchase of eOne, making them the owners of Death Row Records. In April 2021, Hasbro and Entertainment One, E1's parent company, announced it would sell-off E1 Music to The Blackstone Group, which its acquisition was completed in June 2021.

=== 2022–present: Revival through Snoop Dogg and third generation ===
On February 9, 2022, ahead of the release of his next album and his appearance in the Super Bowl LVI halftime show, Snoop Dogg announced that he would acquire the rights to the Death Row Records trademarks from MNRK Music Group (the renamed eOne Music). The sale did not immediately include rights to the label's catalog, but it was reported that he was nearing a deal to acquire the catalogs of himself and other Death Row artists from MNRK. On February 11, 2022, Snoop Dogg released his third studio album on Death Row Records, marking a 26-year lapse from the label after his sophomore album.

Snoop Dogg's purchase of Death Row Records did not include the rights to Tupac or Dr. Dre's albums originally which those rights have been reverted back to Interscope Records. On March 4, 2022, in an interview with Tidal, Snoop Dogg stated he acquired the rights to all the albums previously released on Death Row Records, including his debut studio album Doggystyle and Dr. Dre's The Chronic. Despite the interview, Dr. Dre's lawyer, Howard King, denied the "false reports" two days later, stating that Dre still retained total control of The Chronic, which came back to streaming services on February 1, 2023. On April 18, 2022, after Death Row's catalogue was removed from streaming services, it was announced that Death Row Records would have its own streaming service, which pays higher royalties to its artists than main music streaming services.

In December 2022, Snoop Dogg sold a stake of Death Row's catalogue to former Apple Music's Global Creative Director Larry Jackson's music label Gamma. In early 2023, October London's The Rebirth of Marvin was released. On February 12, 2023, Snoop Dogg announced that Death Row's catalogue would return to TikTok via association with music distribution company SoundOn. Death Row's catalogue returned to all music streaming services on March 9.

Following more than a year with no studio albums, on May 31, 2024, Tha Dogg Pound released W.A.W.G. (We All We Got), their first non-independent studio album in nearly three decades. On October 11, October London released his second studio album on the label, October Nights. On December 13, Snoop Dogg released Missionary, entirely produced by Dr. Dre. It went on the peak at number 20 on the Billboard 200 and sell over 38,000 album-equivalent units. On May 15, 2025, Snoop Dogg released Iz It a Crime?, was previewed at a private screening in New York City two days prior. On April 10, 2026, he would also release 10 'Til Midnight, which was co-released with the short film Stop Counting My Poccets.

== Gang violence ==
Death Row Records has been referred to as "the most controversial record label in history", due to Suge Knight's practice of hiring gang members and the gang-related violence which plagued the record label. Knight, who was a member of the Mob Piru Bloods, hired gang members from his set, as well as other sets, including the Fruit Town Piru and Lueders Park Piru. There have been several murders committed by gang members affiliated with Death Row Records. Furthermore, many of the Bloods who worked for the record label would eventually be murdered.

=== Murder of William "Rat" Ratcliffe ===
In 1995, an aspiring rapper and member of the Bounty Hunter Bloods named William "Rat" Ratcliffe was pressuring Suge Knight to sign him to Death Row Records. After Ratcliffe confronted Knight with 10 other Bounty Hunter Bloods, Knight ordered Wardell "Poochie" Fouse, who was a fellow Mob Piru member, to kill Ratcliffe.

=== Murder of the Notorious B.I.G. ===
After the murder of Tupac Shakur, Knight was incarcerated due to probation violations. Knight held Sean Combs, the CEO of Bad Boy Records, responsible for the death of Shakur and sought revenge. Through his then-girlfriend Theresa Swann, the incarcerated Knight contacted Wardell Fouse and hired him to kill The Notorious B.I.G. Swann was given $25,000, of which $13,000 would go to Fouse.

During the initial investigation into Wallace's murder, Fouse was not a suspect, as detective Russell Poole's prime suspects were the LAPD officer David Mack and Mack's friend Amir Muhammed (Harry Billups). After Poole resigned from the department in 1999, the case stalled. After the case was reopened in 2006, the lead detective, Greg Kading, concluded that Wardell Fouse was the shooter. As Fouse was murdered in 2003, no charges were pressed against him.

=== Feud between the Mob Piru and Fruit Town Piru ===
By the early 2000s, a rivalry had developed between the Mob Piru Bloods and the Fruit Town Piru Bloods, resulting in the deaths of several Mob Pirus associated with Death Row Records, including (but not limited to):

- Alton "Buntry" McDonald, who was shot dead on April 3, 2002, allegedly by George Williams, who also went by the nicknames "G" or "Ponytail".
- Henry "Hendog" Smith, who designed the logo for Death Row Records. Smith was shot dead on October 16, 2002. Smith was killed by a member of the Denver Lanes Bloods.
- Wardell "Poochie" Fouse, who was shot dead on July 24, 2003.

This feud started when George "G" Williams, who worked as a bodyguard for Suge Knight, was fired after he failed to return two Death Row Records cars which he borrowed. After Williams was fired, he became a close associate of Rodrick Cardale "Lil Rod" Reed, a Fruit Town Piru member. The pair are alleged to be behind the murders of the Mob Piru Bloods from Death Row Records.

== Roster ==
=== Current artists ===
Act	Years on the label	Releases under the label
Snoop Dogg	1991–1998 2022–present	6
October London	2023–present	2
Tha Dogg Pound	1992–1998, 2024–present	2
Tha Eastsidaz	2024–present	1
Dave Hollister	2026–present	–
Kurupt	1992-1996, 2002-2005, 2026–present	2
Merkules	2022-Present	1

== Discography ==
=== Prominent albums ===
Artist	Album	Details
Dr. Dre	The Chronic	Released: December 15, 1992; Chart positions: No. 3 U.S.; RIAA certification: 3× Platinum
Snoop Doggy Dogg	Doggystyle	Released: November 23, 1993; Chart positions: No. 1 U.S.; RIAA certification: 4× Platinum
Tha Dogg Pound	Dogg Food	Released: October 31, 1995; Chart positions: No. 1 U.S.; RIAA certification: 2× Platinum
2Pac	All Eyez on Me	Released: February 13, 1996; Chart positions: No. 1 U.S.; RIAA certification: Diamond (10× Platinum)
Makaveli	The Don Killuminati: The 7 Day Theory	Released: November 5, 1996; Chart positions: No. 1 U.S.; RIAA certification: 4× Platinum
Snoop Doggy Dogg	Tha Doggfather	Released: November 12, 1996; Chart positions: No. 1 U.S.; RIAA certification: 2× Platinum
The Lady of Rage	Necessary Roughness	Released: June 24, 1997; Chart positions: No. 32 U.S.
Daz Dillinger	Retaliation, Revenge and Get Back	Released: March 31, 1998; Chart positions:No. 8 U.S.
Michel'le	Hung Jury	Released: August 24, 1998; Chart positions: –
2Pac	Until the End of Time	Released: March 27, 2001; Chart positions: No. 1 U.S.; RIAA certification: 3× Platinum
2Pac	Better Dayz	Released: November 26, 2002; Chart positions: No. 5 U.S.; RIAA certification: 2× Platinum
Kurupt	Against the Grain	Released: August 23, 2005; Chart positions: No. 60 U.S.
Danny Boy	It's About Time	Released: April 20, 2010; Chart positions: –
Crooked I	Hood Star	Released: June 15, 2010; Chart positions: –
Sam Sneed	Street Scholars	Released: January 25, 2011; Chart positions: –
LBC Crew	Haven't You Heard	Released: February 8, 2011; Chart positions: –
O.F.T.B.	Damn Near Dead	Released: July 12, 2011; Chart positions: –
Jewell	Black Diamond	Released: November 22, 2011; Chart positions: –
Snoop Dogg	BODR	Released: February 11, 2022; Chart positions: No. 104 U.S.
Jane Handcock	World of Women	Released: January 20, 2023; Chart positions: -
October London	The Rebirth of Marvin	Released: February 10, 2023; Chart positions: –
Tha Dogg Pound	W.A.W.G. (We All We Got)	Released: May 31, 2024; Chart positions: –
October London	October Nights	Released: October 11, 2024; Chart positions: –
Snoop Dogg	Missionary	Released: December 13, 2024; Chart positions: No. 20 U.S.
Charlie Bereal	Walk With the Father	Released: January 24, 2025; Chart positions: –
Snoop Dogg	Iz It a Crime?	Released: May 15, 2025; Chart positions: –
Jane Handcock	It's Me, Not You	Released: July 11, 2025; Chart positions: -
Snoop Dogg	10 Til' Midnight	Released: April 10, 2026; Chart positions: –
Kurupt & DJ Battlecat	Tales From My Hood	Released: July 31, 2026; Chart positions: -

=== Compilation albums ===
Artist	Album	Details
Various Artists	Above the Rim	Released: March 22, 1994; Chart positions: No. 2 U.S.; RIAA certification: 2× Platinum
Various Artists	Murder Was the Case	Released: October 15, 1994; Chart positions: No. 1 U.S.; RIAA certification: 2× Platinum
Various Artists	Death Row Greatest Hits	Released: November 26, 1996; Chart positions: No. 36 U.S.; RIAA certification: Platinum
Various Artists	Christmas on Death Row	Released: December 3, 1996; Chart positions: No. 155 U.S.
Various Artists	Gridlock'd	Released: January 28, 1997; Chart positions: No. 1 U.S.; RIAA certification: Gold
Various Artists	Gang Related	Released: October 7, 1997; Chart positions: No. 2 U.S.; RIAA certification: 2× Platinum
2Pac	Greatest Hits	Released: November 24, 1998; Chart positions: No. 3 U.S.; RIAA certification: Diamond
Various Artists	Suge Knight Represents: Chronic 2000	Released: May 4, 1999; Chart positions: No. 11 U.S.
Various Artists	Too Gangsta for Radio	Released: September 26, 2000; Chart positions: No. 171 U.S.
Snoop Doggy Dogg	Dead Man Walkin'	Released: October 31, 2000; Chart positions: No. 24 U.S.
Tha Dogg Pound	2002	Released: July 31, 2001; Chart positions: No. 36 U.S.
Snoop Doggy Dogg	Death Row: Snoop Doggy Dogg at His Best	Released: October 23, 2001; Chart positions: No. 28 U.S.
Various Artists	Dysfunktional Family	Released: March 11, 2003; Chart positions: No. 95 U.S.
2Pac	Nu-Mixx Klazzics	Released: October 7, 2003; Chart positions: No. 15 U.S.
Various Artists	The Very Best of Death Row	Released: February 22, 2005; Chart positions: No. 94 U.S.
Various Artists	15 Years on Death Row	Released: December 26, 2006; Chart positions: –
2Pac	Nu-Mixx Klazzics Vol. 2	Released: August 14, 2007; Chart positions: No. 45 U.S.
2Pac	Best of 2Pac, Part 1: Thug	Released: December 4, 2007; Chart positions: No. 65 U.S.
2Pac	Best of 2Pac, Part 2: Life	Released: December 4, 2007; Chart positions: No. 77 U.S.
Snoop Doggy Dogg	Death Row: The Lost Sessions Vol. 1	Released: October 13, 2009; Chart positions: –
Tha Dogg Pound	Doggy Bag	Released: July 3, 2012; Chart positions: –
Tha Eastsidaz	Still Easty	Released: October 25, 2024; Chart positions: –
Chocc	Journals to Johnny	Released: December 6, 2024; Chart positions: –
Various Artists	Death Row Revue	Released: January 3, 2025; Chart positions: -
Various Artists	Altar Call	Released: April 27, 2025; Chart positions: -

== See also ==
- Death Row Records artists
- Death Row Records discography
- List of record labels
