= Sam Sneed production discography =

The following is a list of songs produced by Sam Sneed.

Title	Performer(s)	Album
I Can't Hold Back Premonition of a Black Prisoner Sneak Tip Who's Killin' Who? Household Maid King of the Mountain (1992)	K-Solo	Time's Up
Where We From	Lil Raz, PMD, Uniq	Zero Tolerance
U Better Recognize (1994)	Sam Sneed Feat. Dr. Dre	Murder Was the Case
Natural Born Killaz (1994)	Dr. Dre Feat. Ice Cube	Murder Was the Case
U Better Recognize (Extended Remix) (1994)	Sam Sneed Feat. Dr. Dre	Death Row: The Singles Collection
Keep Their Heads Ringin' (1995)	Dr. Dre Feat. Jewell	Friday
Entire Album	Sam Sneed	Street Scholars (Unreleased) (1995)
Street Scholars (Alternative Version), Lady Heroin (Original)	J. Flexx	Stayin Alive
Blueberry (1996)	Tha Dogg Pound, LBC Crew, Prince Ital Joe	Tha Doggfather
Closer (Sam Sneed Version) (1997)	Capone-n-Noreaga	Closer Single
Bag O' Weed (1998)	Nate Dogg Feat. Tray Dee	G-Funk Classics, Vol. 1 & 2
Streets Is All I Know (Sam Sneed Radio Mix) (1998)	Jake The Flake & The Flint Thugs	
Sleepin' With The Enemy (1999)	Cherrelle	The Right Time
Anything (2000)	Jay-Z	The Truth
Super Bitch (2001)	JT Money	Blood Sweat and Years
The Golden Child (2003)	Sam Sneed Feat. Jasz & Tigha	The Golden Child (VLS Single)
Put It Down (2003)	Josey Whales Feat. Sam Sneed	
What Comes Around, The Matrix (2003)	Sam Sneed	What Comes Around Single
Thug Gonna Do (2003)	P. Skam Feat. Sam Sneed & Kynady Lee	
I Smell Pussy (2003)	G-Unit	Beg For Mercy
Fuckin With Face (2003)	Scarface	Balls and My Word
Cali (2003)	Jasz aka Kynady Lee Feat. Sam Sneed	The Nominee's Are...And The Winner Is (Vol. 2)
We Wanna Thank You (The Things You Do) (Remix)	Big Brovaz	We Wanna Thank You (The Things You Do) single
Curious (2005)	Tony Yayo Feat. Joe	Thoughts Of A Predicate Felon
Her Again (2005)	Crave	Demboyz
Till Thee Angels Come (2007)	Killah Priest Feat. Hell Razah	The Offering
Slaves (2008)	Sam Sneed Feat. Meshun Fuller	
I'm A Gangsta (2008)	Big Pokey	Evacuation Notice
Natural Born Killaz (Original Version)	Dr. Dre Feat. Sam Sneed & Ice Cube	Death Row The Ultimate Collection
Outlaw Immortalz	2Pac & Outlawz	Unreleased
They Get Around (2010)	Jeff Chery	The Transition
Entire Album	Sam Sneed	Street Scholars (2011)
