= 1995 Source Awards =

Music awards ceremony

The Source Awards
- Date: August 3, 1995
- Location: Paramount Theater (New York City, New York)
- Country: United States
- First award: 1994

Highlights
- Most awards: The Notorious B.I.G. (4)

The 1995 Source Awards were held at the Paramount Theater in New York City on August 3, 1995. The awards show is widely considered one of the most influential and infamous events in the history of hip-hop. The show escalated tensions between the East and West Coast hip-hop communities, thereby likely catalysing the murders of Tupac Shakur and The Notorious B.I.G. within the following two years. Televised nationally, the show also worsened America's moral panic about the influence of rap and hip-hop on its youth.

== Events of the night ==
The East Coast hip-hop community was represented by Bad Boy Records, fronted primarily by its producer Sean Combs and its star talent Biggie Smalls, while the West Coast was represented by Death Row Records, fronted primarily by its producer Suge Knight and its star talents Snoop Dogg and Dr. Dre (Tupac Shakur being imprisoned at the time).

The first hour was mostly celebratory, featuring long medleys from both Bad Boy and Death Row, although one notable disturbance was the reception given to OutKast by the mostly pro-East Coast theater audience (the show being held in New York). Booed for winning New Group of the Year, OutKast's André 3000 fired back at the crowd in his acceptance speech: "The South got somethin' to say!" This proved to be a galvanising moment for Southern hip-hop, which had long sought to distinguish itself from its East and West counterparts.

A more serious blow was landed by Suge Knight, in his acceptance speech for Motion Picture Soundtrack of the Year, announcing: "Any artist out there wanna be a' artist, and wanna stay a star, and don't wanna – and won't have to worry about the executive producer tryna be all in the videos, all on the records, dancin' – come to Death Row!" This was clearly a barb at Sean Combs's tendency to ad-lib in his clients' records and appear in their videos, and it antagonised the pro-East Coast audience.

John Singleton, one of the presenters for the next award, Producer of the Year, attempted to placate the murmuring and jeering crowd, declaring, "We gotta kill all this East Coast, West Coast, South, Midwest dissension in rap", but to no avail. The West Coast's Dr. Dre was announced as the winner, and was joined on stage by Snoop Dogg, but the audience's hostility prompted Snoop to launch into a furious, expletive-laden tirade: "The East Coast ain't got no love for Dr. Dre and Snoop Dogg and Death Row?!"

With tension surfacing in various forms over the rest of the evening, some speakers attempted rapprochement, most notably Combs himself. While presenting Solo Artist of the Year, Combs announced, "Contrary to what other people may feel, I would like to say that I'm very proud of Dr. Dre, of Death Row and Suge Knight for their accomplishments... and all this East and West [conflict], that needs to stop. So give it up for everybody from the East and the West that won tonight. One love." Snoop, winning Solo Artist of the Year, was now pacific in his speech ("Oh we doin' it like players now... now that we done made the East Coast-West Coast thing officially one love"), and Biggie, winning Album of the Year, avoided (at Combs's request, it turned out) inflaming the situation further.

At the after-party, held in the nearby Tunnel nightclub, Knight and Combs briefly sat down together and conversed on camera, and Knight denied that he had been referring to Combs in his original barb, claiming instead to have been referring to Jermaine Dupri.

== Aftermath ==
Despite attempts at rapprochement, the 1995 Source Awards set off a causal chain of hostile events. A month after the show, in September 1995, Knight's close friend, Jai "Big Jake" Robles, was shot dead at Dupri's birthday party as Robles was entering a limousine, with Knight accusing Combs of involvement in the shooting. In October 1995, Tupac (released on bail) was known to have begun interacting with Biggie's estranged wife, Faith Evans. In December 1995, Biggie seemingly incited his followers to target Death Row's Tha Dogg Pound while the group was filming a music video in Brooklyn (and thus in East Coast territory), leading to shots being fired at the group's trailer. Tupac released many diss tracks aimed in various ways at Bad Boy, most notably Hit 'Em Up in June 1996, targeted primarily at Biggie. Within two years of the 1995 Source Awards, both Tupac and Biggie had been murdered.

== Winners and nominees ==
Winners are in bold text.

=== Artist of the Year (group) ===
- **Wu-Tang Clan**
  - Salt-N-Pepa
  - Gang Starr
  - Heavy D & the Boyz

=== Artist of the Year (solo) ===
- **Snoop Doggy Dogg**
  - Scarface
  - Queen Latifah
  - MC Eiht

=== New Artist of the Year (group) ===
- **Outkast**
  - Bone Thugs-n-Harmony
  - Ill Al Skratch
  - Smif-N-Wessun

=== New Artist of the Year (solo) ===
- **The Notorious B.I.G.**
  - Warren G
  - Method Man
  - Da Brat

=== Lyricist of the Year (group or solo) ===
- **The Notorious B.I.G.**
  - Redman
  - Nas
  - Big Mike

=== Rap Album of the Year ===
- **The Notorious B.I.G. – Ready to Die**
  - Nas – Illmatic
  - Outkast – Southernplayalisticadillacmuzik
  - Scarface – The Diary

=== Single of the Year ===
- **Craig Mack – "Flava in Ya Ear"**
  - Bone Thugs-n-Harmony – "Thuggish Ruggish Bone"
  - The Lady of Rage – "Afro Puffs"
  - Warren G featuring Nate Dogg – "Regulate"

=== Motion Picture Soundtrack of the Year ===
- **Above the Rim**
  - Jason's Lyric
  - Murder Was the Case
  - Poetic Justice

=== Acting Performance, Movie or TV ===
- **Ice Cube – Higher Learning**

=== R&B Artist of the Year ===
- **Mary J. Blige**
  - TLC
  - Brandy
  - R. Kelly

=== Producer of the Year ===
- **Dr. Dre**
  - DJ Premier
  - Easy Mo Bee
  - Pete Rock

=== Reggae/Hip-Hop Artist of the Year ===
- **Mad Lion**

=== Live Performer of the Year (group or solo) ===
- **The Notorious B.I.G.**

=== Video of the Year ===
- **Dr. Dre and Ice Cube – "Natural Born Killaz"**
  - Craig Mack – "Flava in Ya Ear"
  - Snoop Dogg – "Murder Was the Case"
  - Coolio – "Fantastic Voyage"

=== Lifetime Achievement Award ===
- **Eazy-E**

=== Pioneer Award ===
- **Run-DMC**

== Performances ==
- Craig Mack – "Flava in Ya Ear"
- Faith Evans – "You Used to Love Me"
- Total – "Can't You See"
- Junior M.A.F.I.A. featuring The Notorious B.I.G. – "Player's Anthem"
- The Notorious B.I.G. – "One More Chance"
- Da Brat – "Give It 2 You"
- Method Man – "Bring the Pain"
- Dr. Dre – "Keep Their Heads Ringin'"
- Tha Dogg Pound – "What Would You Do?"
- The Lady of Rage – "Afro Puffs"
- Sam Sneed – "U Better Recognize"
- DJ Quik – "Dollaz + Sense"
- Snoop Doggy Dogg – "Murder Was the Case"
- Bone Thugs-n-Harmony – "Thuggish Ruggish Bone"
- Bone Thugs-n-Harmony – "Foe tha Love of $"
- Bone Thugs-n-Harmony – "1st of tha Month"
