= Sam Sneed discography =

- Studio albums: 1
- Singles: 1
- Music videos: 2

This is the discography of Sam Sneed, an American record producer and rapper . For song-writing credits, see Sam Sneed production discography.

Sam Sneed planned to release an Album with his Group Street Scholars In 1996 Lady Heroin was meant to be a single for the album, even a music video was shot for it but was later remixed and put on the Gridlock'd (soundtrack) this time with J-Flexx and The Lady of Rage.

== Albums ==
=== Studio ===
Year	Title	Chart position (U.S.)	Chart position (UK)	RIAA certification
1996	Street Scholars: Released:Unreleased (to be partly released January 25, 2011); Label: Death Row		-	
2003	Street Scholars Mixtape: Label: Street Scholars Entertainment		-	
2011	Street Scholars (4 tracks from the unreleased album, with 10 new ones from Sneed): Label: WideAwake Ent. / Death Row Records		-	

== Singles ==
=== Solo ===
Year	Song	Chart positions				Album
Year	Song	U.S. Hot 100	U.S. R&B	U.S. Rap	UK	Album
1995	"U Better Recognize" (featuring Dr. Dre)	16	48	48	did not chart	Murder Was the Case
1995	"U Better Recognize (Extended Remix)" (feat. Dr. Dre)	-	-	-	-	"U Better Recognize" (single), Death Row: The Singles Collection
2011	"Lady Heroin" (feat. J-Flexx): Recorded: 1994	-	-	-	-	Street Scholars
