= Friday (soundtrack) =

Friday (Original Motion Picture Soundtrack)

Soundtrack album by various artists
- Released: April 11, 1995
- Recorded: 1994
- Studios: Street Knowledge Recording Studio (Los Angeles); Dre's Crib (Los Angeles); Digital Services (Houston); Digital Shack (Los Angeles); Larrabee Sound Studios (Los Angeles); Ocean 11; Image Recording Studios (Los Angeles); Yo Mama's House (Hollywood); Firehouse Studio (New York City); The Archive (Oakland, California); The Plant (California); Luke Recording Studio (Miami)
- Genres: West Coast hip hop; gangsta rap; hardcore hip hop; G-funk; funk; soul
- Length: 64:08
- Label: Priority
- Producers: 2 Live Crew; Angela Winbush; Bootsy Collins; CMT; DJ Muggs; DJ Pooh; Dr. Dre; E-A-Ski; E-Swift; Ice Cube; N.O. Joe; Ralph Tha Funky Mexican; Rashad Coes; Roger Troutman; Ronald Isley

Singles from Friday
- 1. "Keep Their Heads Ringin'" Released: March 7, 1995; 2. "Friday" Released: May 1995; 3. "Blast If I Have To" Released: June 24, 1995

Friday (Original Motion Picture Soundtrack) is the soundtrack to F. Gary Gray's 1995 stoner film Friday. It was released on April 11, 1995, through Priority Records and consists of hip hop and R&B music.

Recording sessions took place at Street Knowledge Recording Studio, Dre's Crib, Digital Shack, Larrabee Sound Studios, Image Recording Studios and Yo Mama's House in Los Angeles, at Digital Services in Houston, at Firehouse Studios in New York, at the Archive in Oakland, at the Plant Studios in California, at Luke Recording Studio in Liberty City, and at Ocean 11 Suite 7. Production was handled by film writers Ice Cube and DJ Pooh, as well as DJ Muggs, the 2 Live Crew, Angela Winbush, Bootsy Collins, Dr. Dre, E-A-Ski & CMT, E-Swift, N.O. Joe, Ralph tha Funky Mexican, Rashad Coes, Roger Troutman and Ronald Isley, with Sam Sneed co-producing the album's lead single "Keep Their Heads Ringin'", and Patricia Charbonnet and Toby Emmerich serving as executive producers.

It features appearances from film star Ice Cube, Bernie Worrell, Bootsy Collins, CJ Mac, Cypress Hill, Dr. Dre, E-A-Ski, Funkdoobiest, Mack 10, Nancy Fletcher, Rick James, Roger Troutman, Rose Royce, Scarface, Tha Alkaholiks, The Isley Brothers, Threat, and the 2 Live Crew.

The soundtrack reached No. 1 on the Billboard 200, where it held the position for 2 weeks, and the Top R&B/Hip-Hop Albums chart for 6 weeks. It also spawned the successful Dr. Dre single "Keep Their Heads Ringin'", which made it to No. 10 on the Billboard Hot 100 and No. 1 on the Hot Rap Tracks chart. The album was certified double platinum by the Recording Industry Association of America on June 4, 1996. Music videos were shot for "Friday" and "Keep Their Heads Ringin'".

The title track sparked a feud with the hip hop group Cypress Hill, who claimed that Ice Cube had asked for permission to use their track "Throw Your Set in the Air" and had made a very similar track after being denied permission.

== Critical reception ==
Professional ratings
Review scores
| Source | Rating |
|---|---|
| AllMusic | 4.5/5 stars |

AllMusic's Stephen Thomas Erlewine wrote: "the soundtrack to a lightweight comedy co-written by Ice Cube, the record conveys all the strengths of hit urban radio. Keeping all the good elements of the format -- including the G-funk of Dr. Dre, old-school soul, contemporary R&B, and gangsta rap -- the record sounds like a "Best of the '90s" collection". James Bernard of Entertainment Weekly wrote: "No surprises here. Dr. Dre rumbles over his smooth, insistent groove ("Keep Their Heads Ringin'"), Ice Cube sounds angry ("Friday"), Cypress Hill is still obsessed with pot, and E-A-Ski, a Bay Area hip-hop artist, contributes the gun-happy "Blast If I Have To". Throw in Rick James and Isley Brothers classics and you've got a listening experience that's familiar and fun". Rolling Stone reviewer wrote: "accompanying the new comedy penned by Ice Cube and partner D.J. Pooh, FRIDAY....[is a] righteous set".

=== Accolades ===
Accolades for Friday (Original Motion Picture Soundtrack)
| Publication | Accolade | Rank | Ref. |
|---|---|---|---|
| Albumism | 100 Greatest Soundtracks of All Time | —N/a | |
| Billboard | 10 Best Stoner Movie Soundtracks | —N/a | |
| Complex | The 25 Best Hip-Hop Movie Soundtracks of All Time | 19 | |
| Pitchfork | The 50 Best Movie Soundtracks of All Time | 13 | |

== Track listing ==
Friday (Original Motion Picture Soundtrack)
| No. | Title | Writer(s) | Producer | Length |
|---|---|---|---|---|
| 1. | "Friday" (Ice Cube) | O'Shea Jackson; George Clinton; Garry Shider; David Spradley; Gato Barbieri; James Castor; Johnny Pruitt | Ice Cube | 3:49 |
| 2. | "Keep Their Heads Ringin'" (Dr. Dre) | Andre Young; James Anderson; Samuel Anderson | Dr. Dre; Sam Sneed (co.) | 5:06 |
| 3. | "Friday Night" (Scarface and CJ Mac) | Brad Jordan; Bryan Ross; Joseph Johnson | N.O. Joe | 3:40 |
| 4. | "Lettin' Niggas Know" (Threat) | Corey Brown; Mark Jordan; Rashad Coes | DJ Pooh; Rashad Coes | 4:30 |
| 5. | "Roll It Up, Light It Up, Smoke It Up" (Cypress Hill) | Louis Freese; Larry Muggerud | DJ Muggs | 3:31 |
| 6. | "Take a Hit" (Mack 10) | Jackson; Dedrick Rolison | Ice Cube | 4:36 |
| 7. | "Tryin' to See Another Day" (The Isley Brothers) | Ronald Isley; Angela Winbush; Ernie Isley; Marvin Isley | Ronald Isley; Angela Winbush | 3:37 |
| 8. | "You Got Me Wide Open" (Bootsy Collins and Bernie Worrell) | Jackson; William Collins; Bernie Worrell | Bootsy Collins; Ice Cube | 4:47 |
| 9. | "Mary Jane" (Rick James) | Rick James | | 3:59 |
| 10. | "I Wanna Get Next to You" (Rose Royce) | Norman Whitfield | | 3:57 |
| 11. | "Superhoes" (Funkdoobiest) | Muggerud; Jason Vasquez; Ralph Medrano | DJ Muggs; DJ Ralph M | 3:44 |
| 12. | "Coast II Coast" (Tha Alkaholiks) | Ricardo Smith; James Robinson; Eric Brooks | E-Swift | 5:08 |
| 13. | "Blast If I Have To" (E-A-Ski) | Shon Adams; Mark Ogleton | E-A-Ski; CMT | 4:01 |
| 14. | "Hoochie Mama" (2 Live Crew) | David Hobbs; Mark Ross; Christopher Wongwon; Luther Campbell | 2 Live Crew | 3:01 |
| 15. | "I Heard It Through the Grapevine" (Roger Troutman) | Whitfield; Barrett Strong | Roger Troutman | 6:48 |
| Total length: | | | | 1:04:08 |

Sample credits

- Track 1 contains elements from "Last Tango in Paris" written and performed by Gato Barbieri and "The Bertha Butt Boogie Part 1" written by Jimmy Castor and John Pruitt and performed by the Jimmy Castor Bunch
- Track 2 contains elements from "Funk You Up" written by Angela Brown, Cheryl Cook, Gwendolyn Chisolm and Sylvia Robinson and performed by The Sequence
- Track 4 contains elements from "So Funkdafied" written by Jermaine Dupri, Chris Jasper, Ernie Isley, Marvin Isley, O'Kelly Isley Jr., Ronald Isley and Rudolph Isley and performed by Da Brat

=== 10th anniversary edition bonus disc ===
In 2005, on the tenth anniversary of Friday, Priority Records released an eleven-track bonus disc entitled Old School Friday (More Music from the Original Motion Picture) alongside the original soundtrack. It was composed of nine songs, which appeared in the film, plus two songs — "The Chase" and "Hangin' in the Hood" — by Hidden Faces, which were not in the movie.

Old School Friday (More Music From The Original Motion Picture)
| No. | Title | Performer(s) | Length |
|---|---|---|---|
| 1. | "Mary Jane" | Rick James |
| 2. | "Low Rider" | War |
| 3. | "Freddie's Dead" | Curtis Mayfield |
| 4. | "The Way You Do Things You Do" | The Temptations |
| 5. | "I Wanna Get Next to You" | Rose Royce |
| 6. | "I Heard It Through the Grapevine" | Gladys Knight & the Pips |
| 7. | "Little Child Running Wild" | Curtis Mayfield |
| 8. | "Get Up (I Feel Like Being a) Sex Machine" | James Brown |
| 9. | "Heartbreaker (Part I, Part II)" | Zapp |
| 10. | "The Chase" | Hidden Faces |
| 11. | "Hangin' in the Hood" | Hidden Faces |

=== Other songs ===
Two songs did appear in the film but were not released on any soundtrack: "Hittin' Corners" written by Darrel Johnson and Shaquil Taja-Allah and performed by K-Dee, and "Control" written by Jimmy Jam and Terry Lewis and performed by Janet Jackson.

== Personnel ==
Performers

- O'Shea "Ice Cube" Jackson – performer (track 1), additional vocals (track 8)
- Andre "Dr. Dre" Young – performer (track 2)
- Nancy Fletcher – performer (track 2)
- Barbara Wilson – additional vocals (track 2)
- Dorothy Coleman – additional vocals (track 2)
- Brad "Scarface" Jordan – performer (track 3)
- Bryaan "CJ Mac" Ross – performer (track 3)
- Corey "Threat" Lloyd – performer (track 4)
- Louis "B-Real" Freese – performer (track 5)
- Senen "Sen Dog" Reyes – additional vocals (track 5)
- Dedrick "Mack 10" Rolison – performer (track 6)
- The Isley Brothers – performer (track 7)
- William "Bootsy" Collins – performer (track 8)
- Bernie Worrell – performer (track 8)
- Rick James – performer (track 9)
- Rose Royce – performers (track 10)
- Jason "Son Doobie" Vasquez – performer (track 11)
- Tyrone "Tomahawk Funk" Pacheco – additional vocals (track 11)
- Rico "Tash" Smith – performer (track 12)
- James "J-Ro" Robinson – performer (track 12)
- Shon "E-A-Ski" Adams – performer & producer (track 13)
- The 2 Live Crew – performers (track 14)
- Roger Troutman – performer & producer (track 15)
- Stewart "Fingas"/"Stu-B-Doo" Bullard – keyboards (track 2)
- Preston Middleton – bass (track 3)

Production

- Ice Cube – producer
- Dr. Dre – producer (track 2)
- Joseph "N.O. Joe" Johnson – producer (track 3)
- Mark "DJ Pooh" Jordan – producer (track 4)
- Rashad Coes – producer (track 4)
- Larry "DJ Muggs" Muggerud – producer (tracks: 5, 11)
- Ronald Isley – producer (track 7)
- Angela Winbush – producer (track 7)
- Bootsy Collins – producer (track 8)
- Ralph "Tha Funky Mexican" Medrano – producer (track 11)
- Eric "E-Swift" Brooks – producer (track 12)
- Mark "CMT" Ogleton – producer & mixing (track 13)
- David "Mr. Mixx" Hobbs – producer (track 14)
- Roger Troutman – producer (track 15)
- Samuel "Sam Sneed" – co-producer (track 2)
- Luther Campbell – executive producer (track 14)
- Patricia Charbonnet – executive producer
- Toby Emmerich – executive producer
- Andrew M. Shack – co-executive producer

Technical

- Dennis Poore – sample clearances (tracks: 1, 2, 4)
- Madeleine Smith – sample clearances (tracks: 1, 2, 4)
- Mark Spier – sample clearances (tracks: 1, 2, 4)
- Keston Wright – engineering (tracks: 1, 2, 6, 8)
- Tommy D. Daugherty – engineering (track 2)
- Mike Dean – mixing (track 3)
- Flip – engineering (track 3)
- DJ Pooh – mixing (track 4)
- Dave Aron – engineering (track 4)
- Rick Freeman – engineering (track 4)
- Jason Roberts – engineering (tracks: 5, 11), mixing (track 5)
- DJ Muggs – mixing (tracks: 5, 11)
- Conley Abrams – recording & mixing (track 7)
- Angela Winbush – mixing (track 7)
- Nolan Moffitte – engineering (track 12)
- Ken Lewis – mixing (track 12)
- Steve "Fred 40 to the Head" Fredrickson – recording (track 12)
- CMT – engineering & mixing (track 13)
- E-A-Ski – engineering & mixing (track 13)
- Tom Luekens – engineering (track 13)
- Tommy Afont – engineering (track 14)
- Ted Stein – engineering & mixing (track 14)
- Brian "Big Bass" Gardner – mastering
- Frank Fitzpatrick – music supervisor
- Nicola Goode – photography
- Lee Young – legal representation for Ghetto Bird Productions
- Nina Shaw – legal representation for Ghetto Bird Productions

== Charts ==
=== Weekly charts ===
| Chart (1995) | Peak position |
|---|---|
| German Albums (Offizielle Top 100) | 75 |
| New Zealand Albums (RMNZ) | 30 |
| Swedish Albums (Sverigetopplistan) | 47 |
| US Billboard 200 | 1 |
| US Top R&B/Hip-Hop Albums (Billboard) | 1 |

=== Year-end charts ===
| Chart (1995) | Position |
|---|---|
| US Billboard 200 | 40 |
| US Top R&B/Hip-Hop Albums (Billboard) | 10 |
| Chart (1996) | Position |
| US Billboard 200 | 165 |

== Certifications ==
| Region | Certification | Certified units/sales |
|---|---|---|
| Canada (Music Canada) | Gold | 50,000^{^} |
| United States (RIAA) | 2× Platinum | 2,000,000^{^} |
^{^} Shipments figures based on certification alone.

== See also ==
- List of Billboard 200 number-one albums of 1995
- List of Billboard number-one R&B albums of 1995
