= Death Row: The Singles Collection =

Compilation album by Death Row Records
- Released: July 31, 2007
- Recorded: 1992–1997
- Genres: Gangsta rap, G-funk, West Coast hip hop
- Labels: Death Row Records; Koch Records
- Producers: Suge Knight, Dr. Dre, Daz Dillinger, DJ Pooh, Johnny "J", Quincy Jones III, Tupac Shakur, Sam Sneed

Death Row Records chronology
The Very Best of Death Row (2005)	Death Row: The Singles Collection	Ultimate Death Row Collection (2009)

Death Row: The Singles Collection is a compilation album released in 2007 by CEO of Death Row Recordings, Suge Knight, it contains hard to find remixes and b sides by artists such as Snoop Dogg, Tha Dogg Pound, 2Pac, Dr. Dre plus more. This has been removed from Apple Music.

== Track listing ==
=== Disc #1 ===
1. Nuthin' But A "G" Thang (Freestyle Remix) - Snoop Dogg
2. Nuthin' But A "G" Thang (Club Mix) - Dr. Dre & Snoop Dogg
3. Fuck Wit Dre Day (and Everybody's Celebratin') (Extended Mix) - Dr. Dre & Snoop Dogg
4. Puffin' on Blunts & Drankin' Tanqueray (Extended Mix) - Dr. Dre Feat. Tha Dogg Pound & Lady of Rage
5. 187 um (Deep Cover Remix) - Dr. Dre & Snoop Dogg
6. Let Me Ride (Extended Club Mix) - Dr. Dre Feat. Snoop Dogg, George Clinton & Daz
7. Who Am I (What's My Name) (Explicit Club Mix) - Snoop Dogg
8. Gin and Juice (Laid Back Remix) - Snoop Dogg
9. Afro Puffs (Extended Remix) - Lady of Rage Feat. Snoop Dogg & Dr. Dre
10. Afro Puffs (G-Funk Remix) - Lady of Rage
11. Gin & Juice (Remix) - Snoop Dogg [Best Buy Exclusive Track]
12. Who Am I [What's My Name] (Remix) - Snoop Dogg [Best Buy Exclusive Track]

=== Disc #2 ===
1. Regulate (Jammin' Remix) - Warren G Feat. Nate Dogg
2. Regulate (G-Funk Remix) - Warren G Feat. Nate Dogg
3. My Moni Rite - Lord G
4. U Better Recognize (Extended Remix) - Sam Sneed Feat. Dr. Dre
5. Slip N Slide (Remix) - Danny Boy Feat. Tha Dogg Pound
6. Snoop's Upside Ya Head (Remix) - Snoop Dogg Feat. Nate Dogg
7. Doggfather (Timbaland Remix) - Snoop Dogg
8. I Ain't Mad at Cha (Radio Version) - 2Pac Feat. Danny Boy
9. California Love (Single Version) - 2Pac Feat. Dr. Dre & Roger Troutman
10. To Live and Die In L.A. (Radio Version) - 2Pac
11. Hit Em Up - 2Pac
12. It Might Sound Crazy (Remix) - Daz Dillinger Feat. Too Short
13. Dre Day (Remix) - Jewell
14. Let Me Ride (Remix) - Dr. Dre [Best Buy Exclusive Track]
15. Lil' Ghetto Boy (Remix) - Dr. Dre [Best Buy Exclusive Track]
