= Strut Your Stuff =

Strut Your Stuff may refer to:

- "Strut Your Stuff" (Stone City Band song), a 1980 single off the album In 'n' Out
- "Strut Your Stuff" (Young & Company song), a 1981 single
