= Little Runaway =

Little Runaway may refer to:

- Little Runaway (film), a 1952 Tom and Jerry film
- "Little Runaway" (Celeste song), 2020
- "Little Runaway" (Stone City Band song), 1980
