= Zion's Gate Records =

Record shop in Seattle, Washington, U.S.

Coordinates: 47°36′51.3″N 122°19′4.1″W

- Headquarters: Seattle, Washington, United States
- Owner: Stephen Benbrook

Zion's Gate Records is a record shop in Seattle's Capitol Hill neighborhood, in the U.S. state of Washington.

== Description ==
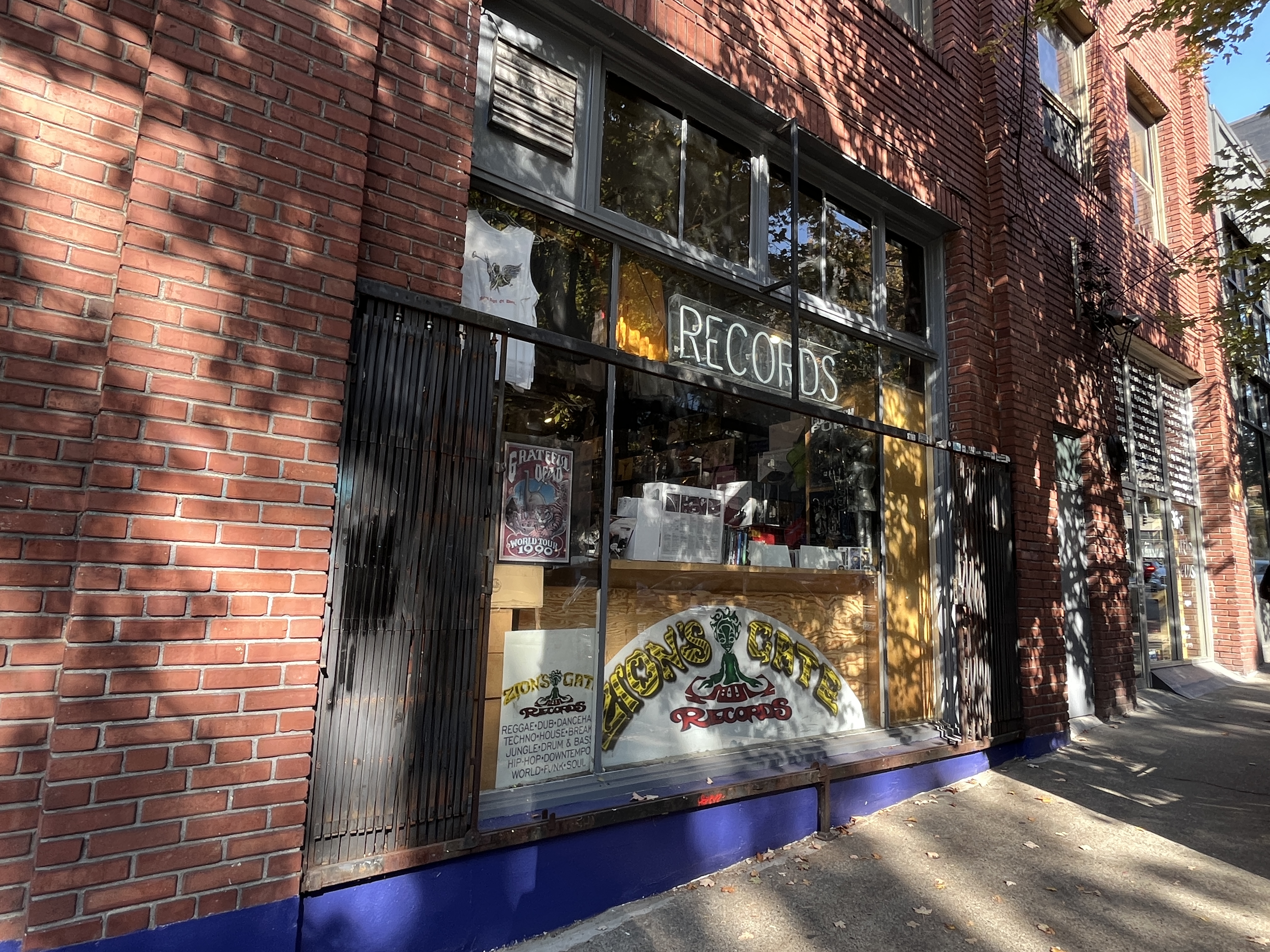
The shop's exterior, 2022

Lonely Planet describes the shop as "A dusty, slightly unkempt record store where some random rummaging will uncover dog-eared heavy metal, second- and third-hand Bowie and rare reggae 45s." Seattle Metropolitan says, "This Pike Street shop carries it all—hip-hop, indie, jazz, and plenty of metal. Flocks of T-shirts float angelically above the crates." The Seattle Times has described Zion's Gate Records as a "small, metal-and-more shop on the Hill". In addition to vinyl records, the shop has sold turntables and smoking accessories.

== History ==
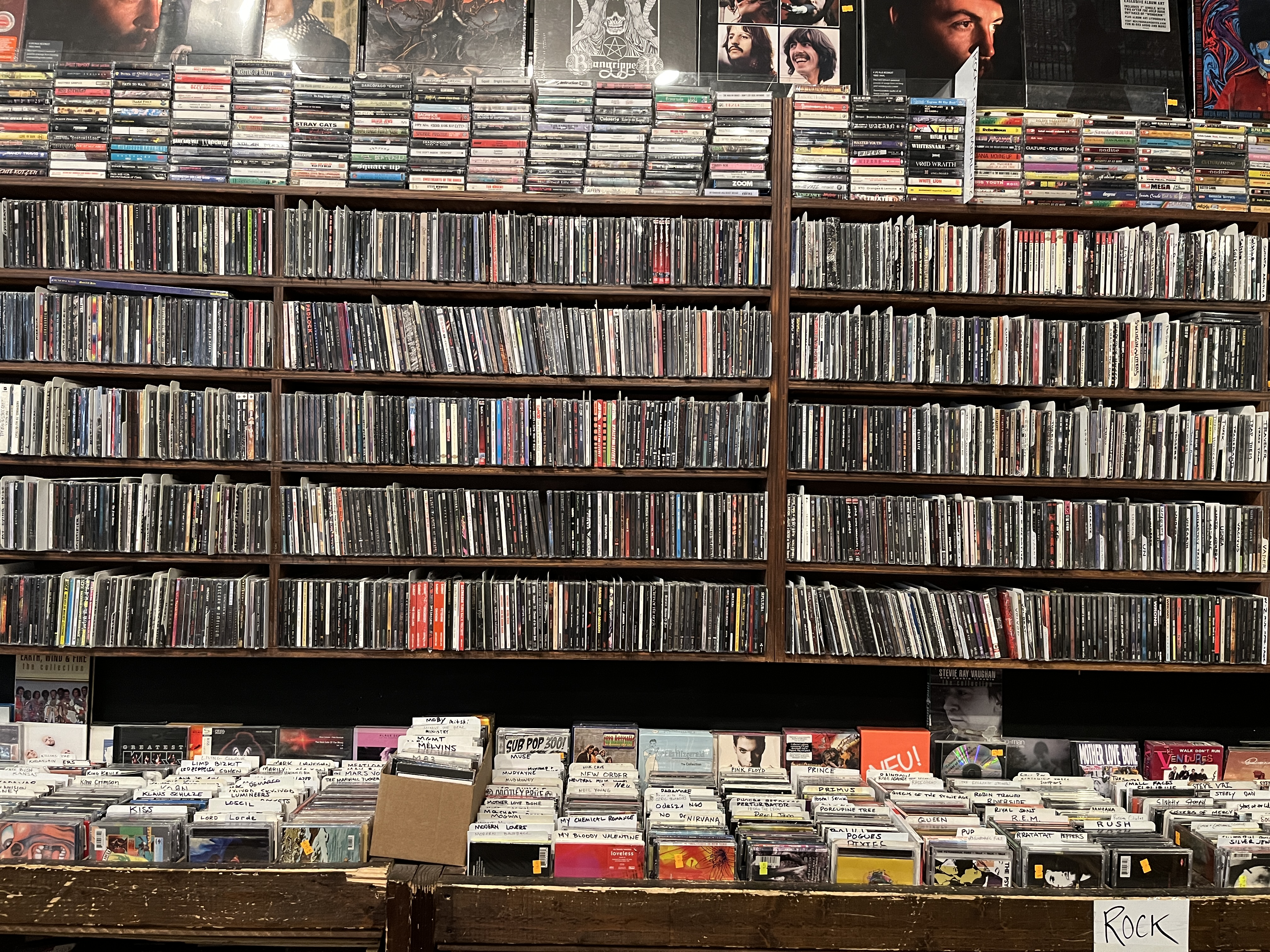
Interior

In 2015, owner Stephen Benbrook said Discogs was his main outlet online, with approximately 500 orders per month.

== Reception ==
In 2010, Erin K. Thompson included the business in Seattle Weekly's list of "The Nine Best Places to Shop for Used Vinyl in Seattle" and wrote, "this Capitol Hill shop—which feels like a warehouse with rows and rows of records packed into a relatively small space—is best known as a metalhead's destination, and it definitely is the first place to hit if you’re looking for Black Sabbath or Nekromantix on wax. But did you know that Zion's Gate also boasts an impressively extensive selection of used hip-hop LPs? It's a little pricier than other locations, but it's one of the only places in the city you'll easily locate secondhand copies of Jay-Z's The Blueprint2 and Snoop Dogg's Tha Doggfather."

The Seattle Post-Intelligencer has said, "A cool, old school shop on Capitol Hill, Zion's Gate is sure to have more than a few releases worth your time." The book Lonely Planet Pocket Seattle says, "While some record stores feel curated, Zion's Gate Records is anything but. Of course, that's all part of then charm. Drop in ready to work your fingers, picking through records in search of rare LPs and 45s."
