= Gettin' Off on You =

Single by Joya

from the album Here I Am
- Released: 1995
- Recorded: 1994
- Genre: R&B; hip hop
- Length: 4:50
- Label: A&M
- Songwriters: Dwayne Richardson; Derek Jenkins; Joanne Thomas
- Producers: Derek Jenkins; Dwayne Richardson; Vincent Herbert

Joya singles chronology
"I Like What You're Doing To Me" (1995)	"Gettin' Off on You" (1995)	"Love You all Ova" (1996)

Music video
- "Gettin' Off on You" Video on YouTube

"Gettin' Off on You" is a song by American R&B/hip-hop singer Joya, released as the second single from her debut album Here I Am. The single peaked at number sixty-seven on the US Billboard R&B Singles chart, and spent two weeks at number-one on the Billboards Bubbling Under R&B Singles chart, where it debuted at number-one.

== Track listing ==
US CD, maxi-single

No.	Title	Length
1.	"Gettin' Off on You" (Radio Edit)	3:49
2.	"Gettin' Off on You" (Untouchables Remix Edit)	3:48
3.	"Gettin' Off on You" (Untouchables Jazz Mix Edit)	3:48
4.	"Gettin' Off on You" (LP Version)	4:50

Notes

- The "Gettin' Off on You" remixes were produced by Edward "Eddie F" Ferrell.

== Charts ==
Chart (1995)	Peak position
U.S. Billboard Hot R&B Singles	67
U.S. Billboard Bubbling Under R&B Singles	1
