= Bad Lady =

Bad Lady may refer to:

- "Bad Lady" (Con Funk Shun song) 1981
- "Bad Lady" (Stone City Band song) 1983
