= Tha Doggfather =

1996 studio album by Snoop Doggy Dogg

Studio album by Snoop Doggy Dogg
- Released: November 12, 1996
- Recorded: February–August 1996
- Studios: Can-Am Studios (Tarzana, Los Angeles); Digital Shack (Sherman Oaks, Los Angeles)
- Genres: West Coast hip-hop; gangsta rap; G-funk
- Length: 74:13
- Labels: Death Row; Interscope
- Producers: Suge Knight (exec.); DJ Pooh; Dat Nigga Daz; Soopafly; L.T. Hutton; Sam Sneed; Arkim & Flair; Snoop Doggy Dogg

Snoop Doggy Dogg chronology
Doggystyle (1993)	Tha Doggfather (1996)	Da Game Is to Be Sold, Not to Be Told (1998)

Singles from Tha Doggfather
- 1. "Snoop's Upside Ya Head" Released: September 14, 1996; 2. "Vapors" Released: January 18, 1997; 3. "Doggfather" Released: April 8, 1997

Tha Doggfather is the second studio album by American rapper Snoop Doggy Dogg. It was released on November 12, 1996, by Death Row and Interscope Records. After the success of his debut album Doggystyle (1993), Snoop was arrested and charged with murder and in 1995, spent time preparing for the case that went to trial. On February 20, 1996, he was cleared of all charges and began working on his second album without Dr. Dre providing work as a record producer. This was Snoop's final album on Death Row until 2022, when he acquired the rights to the Death Row trademarks from MNRK Music Group, releasing BODR the same year. This would also be his last album under the moniker Snoop Doggy Dogg before it was shortened to Snoop Dogg. Recording sessions took place from February 1996 to October 1996, with Suge Knight as the executive producer on the album, alongside the additional production from several record producers such as DJ Pooh, Daz Dillinger, Soopafly and L.T. Hutton; as well as guest appearances from Charlie Wilson, Kurupt, Tray Dee and Warren G, among others.

The album debuted at number one during the week of November 12, 1996, selling 479,000 copies, but it failed to match the commercial success of Doggystyle.

== Background ==
In 1993, Snoop and Dr. Dre began work on Doggystyle which was also very popular and acclaimed. During the recording of Doggystyle, Snoop became a defendant in a murder case which saw his acquittal shortly before this album was released, which led him to no longer live the "gangsta" lifestyle he portrayed in his records.

Dr. Dre, who was Death Row's in-house producer, had left earlier in 1996 to start his own label, which led Snoop's first cousin Daz Dillinger to become Death Row's head producer; he worked on this album. The murder of Snoop's close friend and fellow rapper, label-mate Tupac Shakur in September 1996 also weighed on him heavily; Shakur appears on the closing track "Outro", under the name "Makaveli", which he began using a short while before his death.

=== Title and Artwork ===
The album name and cover is inspired by the 1972 film The Godfather. The artwork was done by the late artist Darryl "Joe Cool" Daniel, Snoop Dogg's cousin, who died in July 2024. Daniel also designed the cover art for Doggystyle.

== Recording and production ==
=== Production ===
During the departure of Dr. Dre from Death Row Records, the majority of this album was produced and mixed by DJ Pooh. In addition to DJ Pooh, Daz Dillinger and several other producers contributed to this album. In 1996, in an interview with Rap City, Snoop Dogg revealed that he had been working with Dr. Dre for this album; however, he had been prevented from doing so by Suge Knight. The album samples songs such as "It's Like That" performed by Run-D.M.C., "Vapors" performed by Biz Markie, "More Bounce to the Ounce" performed by Zapp & Roger, and "Oops Up Side Your Head" performed by The Gap Band. The Doggfather also marked the debut of Snoop Dogg as a record producer on the track "(O.J.) Wake Up". Snoop Dogg also was beginning to be acknowledged on how to play keyboard by a high-profile producer named L.T. Hutton, who led a hand providing some production on that track as well.

=== Lyrics ===
Compared to Doggystyle, the lyrics are much less violent and controversial. On Tha Doggfather, Snoop Dogg wanted to present a more positive image in his lyrics, a reflection of his maturation as an artist and as a new father.

On December 3, 2006, in an interview with VH1, Snoop Dogg revealed the differences between Doggystyle and Tha Doggfather, stating, "I think Tha Doggfather was a rebirth of me, as far as me being more positive on what I was trying to say and, you know, trying to live the life through my music, instead of me just living my life, trying to show people that my life... wasn't like my music...I'm not gonna glorify none of this negativity that Death Row wanted me to do. I'm gonna bring a positive side of music." Although his new lyrical direction was met with mixed feelings from fans and critics alike, Snoop Dogg still thinks of the album as a success: "I enjoyed it and everywhere I go around the world people, you know, I sign more Doggfather records than any other record I put out. That's the one I sign the most and I'm proud at the thing I did and the thing is... sometimes you can outgrow your fans".

== Critical reception ==
=== Critical reaction ===
Professional ratings
Review scores
Source	Rating
AllMusic	3/5 stars
Entertainment Weekly	B+
Muzik	3/5 stars
Los Angeles Times	2.5/4 stars
The New York Times	favorable
The Rolling Stone Album Guide	2.5/5 stars
USA Today	3/4 stars

The album received generally moderate reviews from critics and fans at the time of its release. In a February issue of Spin, Dr. Dre stated his feelings on the album and said "But to be perfectly honest, I don't like Snoop's new album. And it has nothing to do with me not working him, because I'm just like everybody else: I like it, or I don't. The first time I heard the single, I was grooving to it, but then I really started to get into the production and how it was sounding, you know? The first time you hear some shit, you just listen to it to get your groove on, but after that, I start breaking songs down. There's really nothing that was said on there that hasn't been said 50 times before."

Entertainment Weekly praised the album, stating that "Even without Dr. Dre behind the board, Snoop and his studio team concoct an intoxicating blend of old-school funk and gangsta cool", but also noted that "There's not much to love in the album's attitude toward sex, drugs, and first-degree murder." Muzik said, "...a more angular, spiky, old school-influenced vehicle for the Dogg Father to strut his matter-of-act rhymes over... you [are taken in] by the strength of the rhyming...". Melody Maker ranked it number 49 on their list of 1996's 'Albums of the Year'. The Los Angeles Times reported that "Snoop still is one of rap's most electrifying performers. But unlike "Doggystyle" and the "Murder Was the Case" soundtrack, few of the beats on this album rival his rapping prowess." They complimented some of the tracks, calling 'Doggfather' "... the epitome of cool smoothness. Over a slow-rolling Daz and DJ Pooh track" 'Freestyle Conversation' "...an Outkast-style exercise in which Snoop speaks a mile a minute, but still manages to maintain a funky rhythm", 'Gold Rush' a "funky pistolero track" and the Biz Markie remake 'Vapors' "the album's real gem". The review went on to conclude that "Tha Doggfather may not be Doggystyle, but Snoop shows that he has the prowess and the talent to survive."

The New York Times predicted that the album would chart in the top ten due to his presence in the music industry. They also stated that "The album has a few obligatory mentions of sexual exploits and gun-toting, usually delegated to guest rappers. But most of the raps are about his position as a hit-maker. He still has one of the most distinctive deliveries in rap: a casual, nasal, conversational tone that sounds leisurely even when he's barreling forward. His producers are a little less slick than Dr. Dre was, but they have supplied swampy bass riffs and catchy backup choruses, drawing heavily (like Dr. Dre) on George Clinton's P-Funk. Snoop Doggy Dogg insists, and Tha Doggfather does that, maintaining a party atmosphere. Yet while it insists that gangsta rap isn't dead, it plays down tough-guy tales in favor of a star's pronouncements." AllMusic reviewer Stephen Thomas Erlewine noted that the album runs on too long at over 70 minutes and "Though it works the same G-funk territory, the bass is less elastic and there is considerably less sonic detail". But also praised the album by stating "Though the music isn't original, and the lyrics break no new territory, the execution is strong -- Snoop's rapping and rhyming continue to improve, while the bass-heavy funk is often intoxicating." He ended the review stating "...the album is a fine follow-up to one of the most successful hip-hop albums in history."

=== Commercial reception ===
Before the release of the album, many were questioning if the album would become lost in the turmoil and tragedy of the label, or even to be bypassed in the rush of Tupac Shakur's posthumous album The Don Killuminati: The 7 Day Theory.

However, retailers thought differently, such as Violet Brown, urban music buyer for the Wherehouse music chain. "Customer anticipation has been huge. As soon as record executives found out they were opening against Snoop [this week], they shifted the release dates of some rival rap albums to avoid the Snoop sales rush."

The album debuted at number one with strong first week sales of 479,000 copies, with Shakur at number two with second week sales of 250,000 (proving that Death Row still had a strong hold on the pop charts). While falling short of Doggystyle's 803,000 in the first week sold (the record at the time for a rap album), the album still was the third-highest rap debut of that year behind Shakur's All Eyez on Me (566,000 first-week copies) and Killuminati (664,000 copies), and it ranks fourth overall on the year's list of top debuts, which is headed by Metallica's Load (680,000 copies). The album has sold over two million copies in the United States.

== Commercial performance ==
Tha Doggfather debuted at #1 on both the US Billboard 200 and the US Top R&B/Hip-Hop Albums charts, selling 479,000 copies in its first week. The album was certified 2× platinum on February 4, 1997.

== Track listing ==
No.	Title	Writer(s)	Producer(s)	Length
1.	"Intro"		DJ Pooh	0:46
2.	"Doggfather" (featuring Charlie Wilson)	Calvin Broadus	Dat Nigga Daz	3:57
3.	"Ride 4 Me"	Broadus		1:01
4.	"Up Jump tha Boogie" (featuring Kurupt, Charlie Wilson, and Teena Marie)	Broadus; Ricardo Brown	DJ Pooh	4:43
5.	"Freestyle Conversation"	Broadus	Soopafly	4:17
6.	"When I Grow Up"	Broadus	DJ Pooh	0:37
7.	"Snoop Bounce" (featuring Charlie Wilson)	Broadus	DJ Pooh	4:03
8.	"Gold Rush" (featuring Kurupt and LBC Crew)	Broadus; Brown; Jamarr Stamps; David Williams; Reggie Vanterpool; Ralph Wheeler	Arkim & Flair	4:52
9.	"(Tear 'Em Off) Me and My Doggz"	Broadus; D. Williams; Lenton Hutton	L.T. Hutton	3:31
10.	"You Thought" (featuring Too $hort and Soopafly)	Broadus; Brooks; Todd Shaw	Soopafly	4:44
11.	"Vapors" (featuring Teena Marie and Charlie Wilson)	Broadus	DJ Pooh	4:21
12.	"Groupie" (featuring Tha Dogg Pound, Nate Dogg, Warren G, and Charlie Wilson)	Arnaud; Brown; Nathaniel Hale; Bobby Nunn	Dat Nigga Daz	5:06
13.	"2001"	Broadus; Jordan; Brown; Stamps	DJ Pooh	3:50
14.	"Sixx Minutes"	Broadus; Vanterpool; Wheeler	Arkim & Flair	4:40
15.	"(O.J.) Wake Up" (featuring Tray Deee)	Broadus; Tracey Davis	Snoop Doggy Dogg; L.T. Hutton	4:43
16.	"Snoop's Upside Ya Head" (featuring Charlie Wilson)	Broadus	DJ Pooh	4:30
17.	"Blueberry" (featuring Tha Dogg Pound and LBC Crew)	Arnaud; Brown; Stamps; D. Williams; Sam Anderson	Sam Sneed	4:15
18.	"Traffic Jam"	Ricky Harris		0:34
19.	"Doggyland"	Broadus	DJ Pooh	4:39
20.	"Downtown Assassins" (featuring Dat Nigga Daz and Tray Deee)	Arnaud; Davis	Dat Nigga Daz	4:22
21.	"Outro" (featuring Makaveli)		Snoop Doggy Dogg	0:42
Total length:				74:13

== Charts ==
=== Weekly charts ===
Weekly chart performance for Tha Doggfather
Chart (1996)	Peak position
Australian Albums (ARIA)	12
Austrian Albums (Ö3 Austria)	49
Belgian Albums (Ultratop Flanders)	45
Belgian Albums (Ultratop Wallonia)	45
Canada Top Albums/CDs (RPM)	2
Dutch Albums (Album Top 100)	48
Finnish Albums (Suomen virallinen lista)	30
French Albums (SNEP)	9
German Albums (Offizielle Top 100)	23
New Zealand Albums (RMNZ)	6
Scottish Albums (Official Charts)	44
Swedish Albums (Sverigetopplistan)	6
Swiss Albums (Schweizer Hitparade)	41
UK Albums (Official Charts)	15
UK Independent Albums (Official Charts)	29
UK R&B Albums (OCC)	1
US Billboard 200	1
US Top R&B/Hip-Hop Albums (Billboard)	1

=== Year-end charts ===
Year-end chart performance for Tha Doggfather
Chart (1996)	Peak position
UK Top Selling Artist Albums	148
Chart (1997)	Peak position
US Billboard 200	43

== Certifications ==
Certifications for Tha Doggfather
Region	Certification	Certified units/sales
Canada (Music Canada)	Platinum	100,000^{^}
New Zealand (RMNZ)	Gold	7,500^{^}
United Kingdom (BPI)	Gold	100,000^{*}
United States (RIAA)	2× Platinum	2,000,000^{^}
^{*} Sales figures based on certification alone.^{^} Shipments figures based on certification alone.

== See also ==
- List of UK R&B Chart number-one albums of 1996
- List of number-one albums of 1996 (U.S.)
- List of number-one R&B albums of 1996 (U.S.)
