= Strut Your Stuff (Young & Company song) =

Song by Young & Company
- A-side: "Strut Your Stuff"
- B-side: "I Like (What You're Doing to Me)"
- Released: 1980
- Length: 3:51
- Label: Brunswick 55554
- Composers: (B. Young, B. Hankerson, M. Young)
- Producers: B. Hankerson, M. Young, B. Young; Ray Daniels (Executive producer)

"Strut Your Stuff" was a 1980 single for the group Young & Company. It was a chart hit for the group the following year in both the United States and England.

== Background ==
The song appears track one of side one on Young & Company's I Like What You’re Doing to Me! album that was released in 1981.

The 12" UK release of the song was retitled as (Strut Your Stuff) Sexy Lady. It was backed with "Waiting on Your Love".

"Strut Your Sttuff" backed with "Got to Be Free" was released in the Netherlands on Rams Horn RAMSH 1017.

The song shouldn't be confused with a song of the same name which was a 1980 hit by the Stone City Band.

== Reception ==
Young & Co's debut album, I Like What You're Doing to Me was reviewed in the 17 January 1981 issue of Cash Box. The title song and "Strut Your Stuff" were picked out for black contemporary play lists.

According to James Hamilton, the 116bpm mix of "Call It What You Want" by Bill Summers and Summers Heat mixed in well with Young & Co’s "Strut Your Stuff".

The song was given three stars by BadCat Records with the reviewer saying that one would "be hard pressed to come up with a tune that encapsulated early-'80s dance music better than 'Strut Your Stuff'".

== Airplay ==
For the week of 1 January, 1981, "Strut Your Stuff" was a Top Add On at WBLO (998) in New York.

By 21 February, "Strut Your Stuff" received airplay across the United States.

== Charts ==
=== United States ===
For the week of 21 February 1981, "Strut Your Stuff" debuted at No. 88 in the Billboard Top 100 Disco chart. For the week of 28 March, at week six, the record peaked at no. 47. The record spent a total of nine weeks in the chart.

=== UK ===
For the week of 2 March, "Strut Your Stuff (Sexy Lady)" was at No. 102 in the Record Business Ones To Watch chart. It also made its debut at No. 23 in the Record Business Disco Top 50 chart. It peaked at No. 14 for the week of 9 March.
