= Pages from the Book of Life: Chapter 1 =

Studio album by Joya
- Released: September 25, 2001 U.S. Reissue, 2002 U.S.
- Recorded: 1999, 2001
- Genre: Soul, hip hop, R&B
- Length: 1:08:01
- Label: Carmel Park Records, Love Cat Music
- Producer: Dupree "Doitall" Kelly, Joya; Dan Evans

Joya chronology
Here I Am (1995)	Pages from the Book of Life: Chapter 1 (2001)	Jewel (2012)

Pages from the Book of Life: Chapter 1 is the second studio album by American R&B/soul singer Joya, released on September 25, 2001, on the independent label Carmel Park Records. All tracks were written and produced by Du Kelly and Joya. The album features her cover version of reggae artist Bob Marley's classic song, "Caution". The album was re-released in 2002 with some tracks altered, and included four new songs; "Seattle", "If", DIRTY", and "Telephone Call".

== Track listing ==
No.	Title	Writer(s)	Length
1.	"Joya (Intro)"	Joya, Dupree Kelly	1:13
2.	"When I Drop the News"	Joya, D. Kelly	4:09
3.	"Sumthin' Ain't Right"	Joya, D. Kelly	4:08
4.	"Detroit Blues"	Joya, D. Kelly	5:39
5.	"Catch My Tears"	Joya, D. Kelly	4:22
6.	"Autumn"	Joya, D. Kelly	4:23
7.	"It Ain't Cool...It Ain't Fly"	Joya, D. Kelly	4:39
8.	"Not Gonna Let U"	Joya, D. Kelly	4:51
9.	"Can I Get Sum Time?"	Joya, D. Kelly	3:47
10.	"Off Up in Kollege"	Joya, D. Kelly	5:00
11.	"Forbidden"	Joya, D. Kelly	5:53
12.	"Sweet Like Candy"	Joya, D. Kelly	4:11
13.	"Back in the Day"	Joya, D. Kelly	4:13
14.	"Caution"	Bob Marley	12:42

2002 U.S. Reissue Edition
No.	Title	Length
1.	"Sumthin' Ain't Right"
2.	"Detroit Blues"
3.	"Catch My Tears"
4.	"Autumn"
5.	"It Ain't Cool...It Ain't Fly"
6.	"Not Gonna Let U"
7.	"Can I Get Sum Time?"
8.	"Off Up in Kollege"
9.	"Forbidden"
10.	"Sweet Like Candy"
11.	"Back in the Day"
12.	"D.I.R.T.Y."
13.	"Seattle"
14.	"If"
15.	"Telephone Call"

- The tracks "Caution" and "When I Drop the News" were not included on the 2002 U.S. reissue CD.

== Personnel ==
- Joya – Lead vocals, Background vocals
- Dan Evans – Executive producer
- Dupree Kelly – Producer
- Joya Owens – Producer
