= Friday (Ice Cube song) =

1995 song by Ice Cube

- CD cover

Promotional single by Ice Cube

from the album Friday
- Released: 1995
- Studio: Street Knowledge Recording Studio (Los Angeles, California)
- Genre: Gangsta rap; G-funk
- Length: 3:54
- Label: Priority
- Songwriter: O'Shea Jackson
- Producer: Ice Cube

Music video
- "Friday" on YouTube

"Friday" is a song by American rapper Ice Cube from the soundtrack studio album, Friday (1995). The song was written and produced by Ice Cube. The song was released as a promotional single for the album in 1995.

Although the song was limited to a promo release, a music video was filmed for it. The song is known for igniting a feud between Ice Cube and Cypress Hill after they accused him of stealing the song's hook from them.

== Feud with Cypress Hill ==
Cypress Hill were playing unreleased songs for Ice Cube from their upcoming album at the time, Cypress Hill III: Temples of Boom, one of them being Throw Your Set in the Air. Months later after hearing from friends while on tour, Cypress Hill learned that Ice Cube had taken the hook of their song Throw Your Set in the Air and remade it for his own song Friday. This led to Cypress Hill dropping a diss track towards Ice Cube on their Temples of Boom album with the track "No Rest for the Wicked". Ice Cube then responded alongside his group Westside Connection with the track "King of the Hill". Cypress Hill responded with "Ice Cube Killa". Ice Cube later squashed the beef with Cypress Hill and the beef ended on January 1, 1997.
