= Young & Company =

American band

- Also known as: Young & Co
- Origin: New Jersey, United States
- Genres: Disco, funk
- Years active: 1980s
- Labels: Brunswick Records, The Sound of London Records, Excaliber Records Ltd.
- Past members: Buddy Hankerson; Dave Reyes; Jacqueline Thomas; Kenneth Young; Michael Young; William Young

Young & Company was an American soul-funk band active during the 1980s. They had hits with "I Like (What You're Doing to Me)", "Strut Your Stuff" and "Such a Feeling".

== Background ==
Young & Company originated in New Jersey. The band was made up of William Young on lead vocals, arrangements and production, Michael Young on lead vocals, arrangements and production, Kenneth Young on backing vocals, Jacqueline Thomas on lead vocals, Buddy Hankerson on bass, percussion, and Dave Reyes on drums, percussion.

The group's 1981 hit "Strut Your Stuff" shouldn't be confused with a song of the same name which was a 1980 hit by the Stone City Band.

== Career ==
In 1980 the group's single, "I Like (What You're Doing to Me)" debuted at No. 78 on the Billboard Disco Top 100 chart. It peaked at no. 15. It also peaked at no. 20 in the UK. It also made the Jet Soul Brothers Top 20 Singles chart.

The group recorded "Strut Your Stuff", which was composed by Buddy Hankerson, Michael Young and William Young. It was released in 1981. It peaked at No. 47 on the US Dance chart.

The group's single, "I'm Too Cool" was a "Climber" on Radio London for the week of 18 May 1985.

The single, "Such a Feeling" was a hit in 1986, peaking at no. 14 on the US Dance chart.
