= List of UK R&B Albums Chart number ones of 1996 =

The logo of the Official Charts Company, responsible for compiling all of the official music charts in the United Kingdom, including the R&B albums chart.

The UK R&B Chart is a weekly chart, first introduced in October 1994, that ranks the 40 biggest-selling singles and albums that are classified in the R&B genre in the United Kingdom. The chart is compiled by the Official Charts Company, and is based on sales of CDs, downloads, vinyl and other formats over the previous seven days.

The following are the number-one albums of 1996.

== Number-one albums ==
Issue date	Album	Artist(s)	Record label	Ref.
7 January	HIStory: Past, Present and Future, Book I	Michael Jackson	Epic/MJJ Productions	
14 January	HIStory: Past, Present and Future, Book I	Michael Jackson	Epic/MJJ Productions	
21 January	HIStory: Past, Present and Future, Book I	Michael Jackson	Epic/MJJ Productions	
28 January	Sisters of Swing	Various Artists	Polygram TV	
4 February	Sisters of Swing	Various Artists	Polygram TV	
11 February	Sisters of Swing	Various Artists	Polygram TV	
18 February	Sisters of Swing	Various Artists	Polygram TV	
25 February	Sisters of Swing	Various Artists	Polygram TV	
3 March	Best Swing 96 - Vol. 2	Various Artists	Telstar	
10 March	Ocean Drive	Lighthouse Family	Wildcard/Polydor	
17 March	The Best Rap Album in the World... Ever!	Various Artists	Virgin	
24 March	The Best Rap Album in the World... Ever!	Various Artists	Virgin	
31 March	The Best Rap Album in the World... Ever!	Various Artists	Virgin	
7 April	The Best Rap Album in the World... Ever!	Various Artists	Virgin	
14 April	The Best Rap Album in the World... Ever!	Various Artists	Virgin	
21 April	The Best Rap Album in the World... Ever!	Various Artists	Virgin	
28 April	Vybin' 3 - New Soul Rebels	Various Artists	Global Television	
5 May	Boyz of Swing	Various Artists	Polygram Tv	
12 May	Boyz of Swing	Various Artists	Polygram Tv	
19 May	The Score	Fugees	Ruffhouse/Columbia	
26 May	The Score	Fugees	Ruffhouse/Columbia	
2 June	The Score	Fugees	Ruffhouse/Columbia	
9 June	The Score	Fugees	Ruffhouse/Columbia	
16 June	The Score	Fugees	Ruffhouse/Columbia	
23 June	The Score	Fugees	Ruffhouse/Columbia	
30 June	The Score	Fugees	Ruffhouse/Columbia	
7 July	The Score	Fugees	Ruffhouse/Columbia	
14 July	The Score	Fugees	Ruffhouse/Columbia	
21 July	The Score	Fugees	Ruffhouse/Columbia	
28 July	The Score	Fugees	Ruffhouse/Columbia	
4 August	The Score	Fugees	Ruffhouse/Columbia	
11 August	The Score	Fugees	Ruffhouse/Columbia	
18 August	The Score	Fugees	Ruffhouse/Columbia	
25 August	The Score	Fugees	Ruffhouse/Columbia	
1 September	The Score	Fugees	Ruffhouse/Columbia	
8 September	The Score	Fugees	Ruffhouse/Columbia	
15 September	Travelling Without Moving	Jamiroquai	Sony Soho Square	
22 September	Travelling Without Moving	Jamiroquai	Sony Soho Square	
29 September	Travelling Without Moving	Jamiroquai	Sony Soho Square	
6 October	The Score	Fugees	Ruffhouse/Columbia	
13 October	The Score	Fugees	Ruffhouse/Columbia	
20 October	The Score	Fugees	Ruffhouse/Columbia	
27 October	The Score	Fugees	Ruffhouse/Columbia	
3 November	Ocean Drive	Lighthouse Family	Wildcard/Polydor	
10 November	Ocean Drive	Lighthouse Family	Wildcard/Polydor	
17 November	Tha Doggfather	Snoop Dogg	Death Row/Interscope	
24 November	The Score	Fugees	Ruffhouse/Columbia	
1 December	The Score	Fugees	Ruffhouse/Columbia	
8 December	The Score	Fugees	Ruffhouse/Columbia	
15 December	Travelling Without Moving	Jamiroquai	Sony Soho Square	
22 December	Travelling Without Moving	Jamiroquai	Sony Soho Square	
29 December	Travelling Without Moving	Jamiroquai	Sony Soho Square	

== See also ==
- List of UK Albums Chart number ones of 1996
