= Vapors (song) =

1988 single by Biz Markie

Single by Biz Markie

from the album Goin' Off
- B-side: "Biz Is Goin' Off", "The Do Do", "Bad by Myself"
- Released: April 1988
- Genre: Hip hop
- Length: 4:32
- Label: Cold Chillin'
- Songwriters: Marcel Hall; Antonio Hardy; Marlon Williams
- Producer: Marley Marl

Biz Markie singles chronology
"Biz Is Goin' Off" (1988)	"Vapors" (1988)	"Doin' the Mud Foot" (1988)

Music video
- "Vapors" at VH1.com

"Vapors" is a song co-written and performed by American hip hop musician Biz Markie, issued as the fifth single from his debut studio album Goin' Off. The song peaked at #80 on the Billboard R&B chart in 1988.

This song was included in the Playback FM station in Grand Theft Auto: San Andreas (2004).

== Music video ==
The music video was released in 1988 and it was directed by Lionel C. Martin. The video features Biz Markie performing the song while telling the story of people who ignored him before he became famous, only to befriend him after his success.

== Charts ==
=== Weekly charts ===
Chart (1988)	Peak position
US Hot R&B/Hip-Hop Songs (Billboard)	80

== Snoop Doggy Dogg version ==
"Vapors"

Single by Snoop Doggy Dogg featuring Teena Marie and Charlie Wilson

from the album Tha Doggfather
- B-side: "Snoop's Upside Ya Head" [Remix]
- Released: April 8, 1997
- Recorded: 1996
- Genre: G-funk
- Length: 4:21
- Label: Death Row; Interscope
- Songwriter: Calvin Broadus
- Producer: DJ Pooh

Snoop Doggy Dogg singles chronology
"Santa Claus Goes Straight to the Ghetto" (1996)	"Vapors" (1997)	"Doggfather" (1997)

Teena Marie singles chronology
"Warm as Momma's Oven" (1994)	"Vapors" (1997)	"Still in Love" (2004)

Charlie Wilson singles chronology
"Sprung on Me" (1992)	"Vapors" (1997)	"Without You" (2000)

Music video
- "Vapors" at VH1.com

In 1997, American hip hop musician Snoop Doggy Dogg covered "Vapors" and included it on his second studio album Tha Doggfather. The song was issued as the second single from the album and it features vocals from Teena Marie and Charlie Wilson. The song was produced and mixed by DJ Pooh. In 2017, Snoop's version was remixed by DJ Battlecat for the former's fifteenth studio album Neva Left.

=== Music video ===
The official music video for the song was directed by Paul Hunter (under the pseudonym G. Thomas). The music video was released in January 1997.

=== Chart positions ===
Chart (1997)	Peak position
New Zealand (Recorded Music NZ)	7
Scottish Singles Sales (Official Charts)	39
UK Hip Hop/R&B (Official Charts)	6
UK Singles (Official Charts Company)	18
