= Above the Rim (soundtrack) =

Above the Rim – The Soundtrack

Soundtrack album by various artists
- Released: March 22, 1994
- Recorded: 1993–1994
- Genre: West Coast hip-hop; gangsta rap; g-funk; R&B; new jack swing
- Length: 77:47 (CD); 90:05 (Cassette)
- Label: Death Row; Interscope; Atlantic
- Producer: Suge Knight (exec.); Kenny Ortíz (exec.); 2nd II None; Suamana Swoop Brown; Dat Nigga Daz; Dalvin DeGrate; DJ Quik; Dr. Dre; Warren G; Johnny Jay; Tracy Kendrick; Allen "ALLSTAR" Gordon; Brian Alexander Morgan; Nikke Nikole; O.F.T.B.; Darryl Pearson; Sharon Riley; Carl "Butch" Small; Al B. Sure!; DeVante Swing

Death Row Records chronology
| Above the Rim – The Soundtrack (1994) | Murder Was the Case (1994) |

Singles from Above the Rim – The Soundtrack
- 1. "I'm Still In Love With You" / "Part Time Lover" Released: March 22, 1994; 2. "Regulate" Released: April 23, 1994; 3. "Old Time's Sake" Released: May 28, 1994; 4. "Afro Puffs" Released: July 2, 1994

Professional ratings
Review scores
| Source | Rating |
|---|---|
| AllMusic | 4.5/5 stars |
| Entertainment Weekly | A+ |
| Music Week | 3/5 stars |
| Select | 1/5 medals |

Above the Rim – The Soundtrack is the official soundtrack to the 1994 film of the same name. The soundtrack, released by Death Row and Interscope Records on March 22, 1994, was executive produced by Suge Knight. Dr. Dre acted as supervising producer on the project.

The album shipped over two million copies and won the Soundtrack of the Year award at the 1995 Source Awards. The cassette version of the soundtrack contained three extra tracks that could not fit on the CD due to time constraints: "Pain" by 2Pac (with Stretch), "Mi Monie Rite!" by Lord G, and "Loyal to the Game" by 2Pac, Treach from Naughty By Nature, and Riddler. "Pain" was initially rejected for use in the film by Dr. Dre, but at the request of recording engineer Norman Whitfield Jr., the track was recut and remixed for the film by record producer Isaias Gamboa. Under Death Row, Above the Rim soundtrack was the third album under the label to reach number-one on the R&B Albums chart where it stayed for ten nonconsecutive weeks (Heavy D & the Boyz's Nuttin' But Love interrupted that streak for one week), while it went to second place on the Billboard 200 chart. Track 13 is a sensual remake of Rev. Al Green's classic "I'm Still In Love With You" by R&B recording artist Al B. Sure!

== Track listing ==
| No. | Title | Writer(s) | Producer(s) | Length |
|---|---|---|---|---|
| 1. | "Anything (Allstar Remix)" (SWV) | | Brian Morgan, Allen "ALLSTAR" Gordon | 4:07 |
| 2. | "Old Time's Sake" (Sweet Sable) | | Nikke Nikole | 4:20 |
| 3. | "Part Time Lover" (H-Town) | | DeVante Swing | 4:08 |
| 4. | "Big Pimpin'" (Tha Dogg Pound Gangstas) | Delmar Arnaud; Nathaniel Hale; Calvin Broadus | Dat Nigga Daz | 3:58 |
| 5. | "Didn't Mean to Turn You On" (2nd II None) | | 2nd II None, DJ Quik | 4:38 |
| 6. | "Doggie Style" (D.J. Rogers) | | Suamana Brown | 4:33 |
| 7. | "Regulate" (Nate Dogg and Warren G) | Warren Griffin; Nathaniel Hale; Michael McDonald; Ed Sanford; Jerry Leiber; Mike Stoller | Warren G | 4:11 |
| 8. | "Pour Out a Little Liquor" (Thug Life) | Tupac Shakur | Johnny "J" | 3:30 |
| 9. | "Gonna Give It to Ya" (Jewell featuring Aaron Hall) | | Paisley | 4:53 |
| 10. | "Afro Puffs" (The Lady of Rage featuring Snoop Doggy Dogg) | Robin Allen | Dr. Dre, Daz Dillinger | 4:50 |
| 11. | "Jus So Ya No" (CPO Boss Hogg) | | Tony Green | 4:06 |
| 12. | "Hoochies Need Love Too" (Paradise) | | S "Bright Eyess" Riley, Suamana Brown | 4:41 |
| 13. | "I'm Still In Love With You" (Al B. Sure!) | | Al B. Sure! | 3:47 |
| 14. | "Crack 'Em" (O.F.T.B.) | | DJ Quik, O.F.T.B., T.K.O. | 4:25 |
| 15. | "U Bring da Dog Out" (Rhythm & Knowledge) | | Sean "Barney" Thomas | 4:01 |
| 16. | "Blowed Away" (B-Rezell) | | DeVante Swing | 4:06 |
| 17. | "It's Not Deep Enough" (Jewell) | | Mr. Dalvin | 4:28 |
| 18. | "Dogg Pound 4 Life" (Tha Dogg Pound Gangstas) | Ricardo Brown; Delmar Arnaud | Dat Nigga Daz | 4:59 |
| Total length: | | | | 77:47 |

Cassette release
| No. | Title | Producer(s) | Length |
|---|---|---|---|
| 19. | "Pain" (2Pac and Stretch) | Stretch | 4:34 |
| 20. | "Mi Monie Rite!" (Lord G) | Tony Green | 3:08 |
| 21. | "Loyal to the Game" (2Pac, Treach and Riddler) | Reginald Heard | 4:36 |
| Total length: | | | 90:05 |

== Charts ==
=== Weekly charts ===
| Chart (1994) | Peak position |
|---|---|
| US Billboard 200 | 2 |
| US Top R&B/Hip-Hop Albums (Billboard) | 1 |

=== Year-end charts ===
| Chart (1994) | Position |
|---|---|
| US Billboard 200 | 31 |
| US Top R&B/Hip-Hop Albums (Billboard) | 4 |

=== Singles ===
| Song | Chart (1994) | Peak position |
|---|---|---|
| "Afro Puffs" | U.S. Hot Dance Music/Maxi-Singles Sales | 5 |
| "Afro Puffs" | U.S. Hot R&B/Hip-Hop Singles & Tracks | 31 |
| "Afro Puffs" | U.S. Hot Rap Singles | 5 |
| "Afro Puffs" | U.S. The Billboard Hot 100 | 57 |
| "Regulate" | U.S. Hot Rap Singles | 1 |
| "Regulate" | Hot R&B/Hip-Hop Singles & Tracks | 7 |
| "Regulate" | U.S. Billboard Hot 100 | 2 |

== Certifications ==
| Region | Certification | Certified units/sales |
|---|---|---|
| United States (RIAA) | 2× Platinum | 2,000,000^{^} |
^{^} Shipments figures based on certification alone.

== Personnel ==
Information taken from Allmusic.

- Engineers: Dat Nigga Daz, Tommy D. Daugherty, Greg Geitzenauer, Rob Paustian
- Executive in Charge of Music: Toby Emmerich
- Executive Producers: Suge Knight, Kenny Ortíz
- Mixers: Courtney Branch, Craig Burbidge, Rob Chiarelli, Dat Nigga Daz, DJ Quik, Dr. Dre, Greg Geitzenauer, Tracy Kendrick, Nikke Nikole, Chris Puran, Norman Whitfield Jr.
- Mixing Engineers: Craig Burbidge, Rob Chiarelli
- Music Supervisor: Anita Camarata
- Performers: 2nd II None, 2Pac, Big Pimpin' Delemond, Boss Hog, CPO, DJ Rogers, Nate Dogg, Warren G, H-Town, Aaron Hall, Jewell, Lady of Rage, Nanci Fletcher, O.F.T.B., Paradise, Al B. Sure!, Sweet Sable, SWV, Macadoshis
- Producers: 2nd II None, Suamana Swoop Brown, Dat Nigga Daz, Dalvin DeGrate, DJ Quik, Dr. Dre, Warren G, Johnny "J", Tracy Kendrick, Benny Medina, Brian Alexander Morgan, Nikke Nikole, O.F.T.B., Darryl Pearson, Chris Puran, Sharon Riley, Carl "Butch" Small, Al B. Sure!, DeVante Swing
- Production Coordinators: Mary (Alm) Kusnier, Kim Brown, Madelyne Woods
- Remixers: Def Jef, Arty Skye, Meech Wells, Isaias Gamboa (music producer)
- Supervising Producer: Dr. Dre
- Vocals: Allen Gordon Jr., Snoop Doggy Dogg

== See also ==
- List of number-one R&B albums of 1994 (U.S.)
