= What Would You Do? (Tha Dogg Pound song) =

"What Would You Do"

Single by Tha Dogg Pound featuring Snoop Doggy Dogg and Jewell

from the album Murder Was the Case OST and Natural Born Killers (OST)
- Released: 1994
- Recorded: 1994
- Genre: West Coast hip-hop; gangsta rap; G-funk
- Length: 5:07 (4:12 video version)
- Label: Death Row; Interscope
- Songwriters: D. Arnaud; R. Brown; C. Broadus; J. Caples; D. Williams
- Producers: Dat Nigga Daz; Dr. Dre (uncredited)

Tha Dogg Pound singles chronology
"Doggy Dogg World" (1994)	"What Would You Do" (1994)	"Let's Play House" (1995)

Snoop Doggy Dogg singles chronology
"Murder Was the Case" (1994)	"What Would You Do?" (1995)	"Snoop's Upside Ya Head" (1996)

Music video
- "What Would You Do?" on YouTube

Music video
- "What Would You Do?" on YouTube

"What Would You Do?" is the debut single from Death Row Records duo Tha Dogg Pound, released in 1995 as a double A-side, paired with Nate Dogg's "One More Day". The single was released from the soundtrack Murder Was the Case alongside songs by Snoop Doggy Dogg, DJ Quik, Dr. Dre, Ice Cube, Sam Sneed and other Death Row-affiliated artists. The song also appears on the Natural Born Killers soundtrack and the soundtrack for Entourage (where it is listed as "What Would U Do?"), and is the only song from that soundtrack which does not appear in the movie Natural Born Killers.

While the notes originally credited solely Daz as producer, Snoop Dogg later revealed that—among other Daz Dillinger tracks—the song was co-produced by Dre. The song features background vocals by Jewell and the keyboards were done by Priest "Soopafly" Brooks.

It is considered to be a diss song towards B.G. Knocc Out, Dresta, Eazy-E and Ruthless Records. Eazy-E responded with the tracks "Ole School Shit" and his own version of "What Would You Do" called "Wut Would You Do". B.G. Knocc Out and Dresta responded with "D.P.G./K". The song was nominated for Grammy Award for Best Rap Performance by a Duo or Group at the 1996 Grammy Awards.

== Response ==
The song and music video contains disses towards B.G. Knocc Out, Dresta, Eazy-E, and Ruthless Records. Eazy-E responded on his album, Str8 off tha Streetz of Muthaphukkin Compton, with the tracks "Ole School Shit" featuring Dresta and B.G. Knocc Out and his own version of "What Would You Do?" titled "Wut Would You Do" featuring Dirty Red. B.G. Knocc Out and Dresta responded on their album, Real Brothas, with the track "D.P.G./K".

== Live performances ==
Tha Dogg Pound performed the song live at the 1995 Source Awards on August 3, 1995.
