= Doggfather =

1997 single by Snoop Doggy Dogg featuring Charlie Wilson

Single by Snoop Doggy Dogg featuring Charlie Wilson

from the album Tha Doggfather
- Released: April 8, 1997
- Recorded: 1996
- Studio: Can-Am Studios (Tarzana, Los Angeles)
- Genre: West Coast hip hop; mafioso rap; G-funk
- Length: 3:57
- Label: Death Row; Interscope
- Songwriter: Calvin Broadus
- Producer: Dat Nigga Daz

Snoop Doggy Dogg singles chronology
| "Vapors" (1997) | "Doggfather" (1997) | "Wanted Dead or Alive" (1997) |

Music video
- "Doggfather" on YouTube

"Doggfather" is a single by American rapper Snoop Dogg featuring vocals by American musician Charlie Wilson. It was released on April 8, 1997 as the third and final single from Snoop's second album Tha Doggfather (1996). Daz Dillinger produced "Doggfather", and wrote it with Snoop Doggy Dogg and Charlie Wilson. The hip hop song samples "Humpin'" from Wilson's group The Gap Band. "Doggfather" didn't chart in the US, but peaked at number 20 in both New Zealand and the UK.

The song's music video is shot in black-and white and features Snoop in a 1940s gangster club setting. The song was mixed by DJ Pooh and the keyboards were done by Priest "Soopafly" Brooks.

== Background ==
"Doggfather" features Charlie Wilson and it is produced by Snoop Doggy Dogg's Death Row label-mate Daz Dillinger and mixed by DJ Pooh. The song samples Humpin', a 1980 song by featured performer Charlie Wilson's longtime group, The Gap Band. Throughout the song, there are subtle references to Snoop's murder trial which took place prior to the album's release. At the end of the second verse, Snoop raps "Man, you know I ain't tryin' to floss; but ermm murder (murder) murder was the case that they lost".

There is a remix of the song produced by Timbaland that was found on the original single and most currently on The Death Row Singles Collection.

== Music video ==
In the music video it shows Snoop and actor Dave Foley (in the character of a Peter Lorre inspired club owner) sitting at a table in a 1940s-based mansion discussing how Snoop's friends are abusing their power and how they need to "get a jobby job" (referencing the intro from the Gin & Juice music video). Snoop slaps the surprised club owner across the face, leading into the song with Snoop stating "play it again Sam". It shows classic dancing like the boogie and Snoop performing on stage for the rich people in the mansion. Later, Foley's character walks back to Snoop telling him he has no respect for him, and he will no longer stand it and again gets hurt; this time by using Foley's finger to light a cigarette. The whole video was filmed in black and white to give it a "classic gangster feeling". The music video features cameos by Kurupt and Nate Dogg. It was released in April 1997.

== Live performances ==
Snoop performed the song live at the House of Blues on July 4, 1996 as a sneak peek before the album and song were officially released.

== Track listing ==
| Track | Title | Guest(s) | Producer |
|---|---|---|---|
| 1 | Doggfather | Charlie Wilson | Daz Dillinger |
| 2 | Doggfather (remix) | | Timbaland |
| 3 | Midnite Love | Daz Dillinger & Toni Tony Tone | Daz Dillinger |
| 4 | Snoop Bounce (rock & roll remix) | Tom Morello (guitars), Tim Commerford (bass), Brad Wilk (drums) (Rage Against the Machine) | |

== Charts ==
| Chart (1997) | Position |
|---|---|
| New Zealand (Recorded Music NZ) | 20 |
| Scotland Singles (OCC) | 53 |
| UK Hip Hop/R&B (OCC) | 8 |
| UK Singles (Official Charts Company) | 36 |
