= I Like (What You're Doing to Me) =

1980 single by Young & Company

Single by Young & Company
- A-side: "I Like (What You're Doing to Me)"
- B-side: "I Like (What You're Doing To Me) (Instrumental)"
- Released: 1980
- Genre: Post-disco, funk
- Length: 3:47
- Label: Excaliber Records Ltd. EXC 501
- Composers: (B. Young, B. Hank, M. Young)
- Producers: Young & Young

"I Like (What You're Doing to Me)" is a song that brought success to Young & Company in the 1980s. It also brought success to Joya in the 1990s.

== Young & Company version ==
"I Like (What You're Doing to Me)" was a 1980 single for the American group Young & Company. It was a hit for them in the UK that year.

=== Background ===
"I Like (What You're Doing to Me)" was written by Billy Young, Buddy Hank & Mike Young. It was released in the UK in 1980 in 7" format on Excaliber Records Ltd. EXC 501.

The song earned the group a Record Business Disco Award in the Top New Act category.

== Reception ==
Young & Co's debut album, I Like What You're Doing to Me was reviewed in the 17 January issue of Cash Box. The title song and "Strut Your Stuff" were picked out as suitable for black contemporary play lists.

=== Airplay ===
As shown for the week of 22 December in UK music trade magazine, Record Business, "I Like (What You're Doing to Me)" was an extra at two stations, a breaker / climber at one station and on the A list of four stations.

=== Charts ===
==== Record Business 16 - 100 & 1 - 60 ====
For the week of 27 October, "I Like (What You're Doing to Me)" debuted at No. 77 in the Record Business 61 - 100 Singles chart. For the week of 3 November, the single moved up from the previous week's position to its debut position of no. 45 in the Record Business 1 - 60 Singles chart. It peaked at No. 19 for the week of 1 December.

==== Record Business End of Year Top 30 Soul/Disco Singles ====
No. 7.

==== Music Week Top 75 Singles ====
For the week of 29 November, "I Like (What You're Doing to Me)" reached its peak position of No. 20, and held that position for another week.

==== Other charts ====
The record also made the top ten of the Record Business Disco Top 50 chart.

== Joya version ==
"I Like What You're Doing To Me"

Single by Joya

from the album Here I Am
- A-side: "I Like What You're Doing to Me (Radio Edit) (With Rap)"
- B-side: "Takin' Care of Business (Snippet), Love U All Ova (Snippet), Gettin' Off on You (Snippet)"
- Released: 1994
- Length: 3:49
- Label: Atlas 31458 0876-4

Joya recorded a version of the song which became a hit for her in 1995.

=== Background ===
"I Like What You're Doing to Me" was the first single from Joya's Here I Am album that was released on Atlas / PolyGram 31454 03302. The song was released as a cassette single on Atlas 31458 0876-4 in 1994.

=== Reception ===
"I Like What You're Doing to Me" was reviewed in the 4 February 1995 issue of Billboard. It was reviewed from the CD single, released on Atlas 8367. Calling her debut fine, the reviewer said that she slinked atop a rugged funk bassline like a seasoned pro. The song was said to have a memorable hook, and how it was executed made it all worthwhile. The R&B and pop potential was also noted.

Joya's Here I Am album was reviewed by M.R. Martinez in the 20 May 1995 issue of Cash Box. Referring to her new single "I Like What You're Doing to Me" as Funky, Martinez wrote that along with "Here I Am" and "Takin' Care of Business", the song exhibited her vocal skills.

=== Charts ===
==== Cash Box ====
"I Like What You're Doing to Me" debuted at No. 90 in the Cash Box Top 100 R&B Singles chart for the week of 4 March 1995. At week three, the single peaked at No. 81 for the week of 18 March. It stayed in the chart for another week.

==== Billboard Hot R&B ====
"I Like What You're Doing to Me" made its debut at No. 70 in the Billboard Hot R&B Airplay chart for the week of 15 April. It then debuted at No. 69 in the Billboard Hot R&B Singles Sales chart for the week of 29 April. At week three, the single peaked at No. 44 in the Billboard Hot R&B Singles Sales chart for the week of 20 May. At week seven, the single peaked at No. 53 in the Billboard Hot R&B Aïrplay chart for the week of 27 May. The overall peak position for the single was at No. 46 on the Billboard R&B chart

==== Billboard Hot Dance Breakouts ====
Foe the week of 15 April, "I Like What You're Doing to Me" was at No. 5 in the Maxi-Singles Sales section of the Hot Dance Breakouts chart.

=== Video Charts ===
==== Billboard The Clip List ====
For the week of 15 April, "I Like What You're Doing to Me" was an Add at The Box.

==== Billboard Video Monitor ====
For the week of 21 May, "I Like What You're Doing to Me" debuted at No. 25 in the BET section of the Billboard Video Monitor chart. The following week it peaked at No. 24.

== Other versions ==
Lisette Melendez recorded her version of the song which appears on her Imagination album, released in 1997/1998.
