= Natural Born Killaz =

Single by Dr. Dre and Ice Cube

from the album Murder Was the Case
- B-side: "What Would You Do?"
- Released: December 10, 1994
- Recorded: 1994
- Genre: Horrorcore; gangsta rap; hardcore hip-hop; G-funk
- Length: 4:52
- Label: Death Row; Interscope
- Songwriters: Andre Young; O'Shea Jackson; Tracy Curry; James Anderson
- Producers: Dr. Dre; Sam Sneed

Dr. Dre singles chronology
"U Better Recognize" (1994)	"Natural Born Killaz" (1994)	"Keep Their Heads Ringin'" (1995)

Ice Cube singles chronology
"Bop Gun (One Nation)" (1994)	"Natural Born Killaz" (1994)	"Hand of the Dead Body" (1995)

Music video
- "Natural Born Killaz" on YouTube

"Natural Born Killaz" is a single released by Dr. Dre and Ice Cube for the soundtrack of the film Murder Was the Case. It was originally intended for their scrapped album Heltah Skeltah. It would later be used by professional wrestling tag team The Gangstas during their Extreme Championship Wrestling stint before being used by New Jack for the following years. The music video also has a brief appearance of rapper 2Pac towards the end of the video.

The song was originally supposed to be a Sam Sneed and J-Flexx track called "The Heist". J-Flexx ghostwrote Dr. Dre's verses. The keyboards were done by Priest "Soopafly" Brooks.

== Background ==
It is the first time the duo had worked together since the split of N.W.A. The single was released in 1994 in the United States, but was not released until March 30, 1995, in the United Kingdom. The production credits features Soopafly on the keyboards and Nanci Fletcher, Danette Williams and Barbara Wilson on vocals.

The song references such subjects as mass murder, Sarah Connor from the Terminator films, Al Cowlings' tight bond with O. J. Simpson, schizophrenia, Charles Manson, the attack on Reginald Denny during the Rodney King riots, strychnine poisoning, Michael P. Fay's caning in Singapore, Jeffrey Dahmer, Kurt Cobain's suicide and psilocybin mushrooms.

== Album and music video ==
The music video was released for the week ending on November 27, 1994. The album song portrays a couple (performed by Priest ‘Soopafly’ Brooks and Nanci Fletcher) walking down the street until, from a distance, they are yelled at and verbally insulted by a local thug. Though the intro is different in the video and audio versions, both of them involve murder and end with the sound of a gunshot and a woman screaming. The final shot of the video features a cameo from rapper and actor Tupac Shakur, prior to his association with Death Row Records, as a SWAT sniper who takes out Ice Cube's character. Also appearing in the video as police detectives are John Amos and Art Evans. An alternate video exists which depicts a riot reminiscent of the 1992 Los Angeles riots and Dr. Dre and Ice Cube performing on top of an overturned bus. This previously unreleased version was included in the 2000 documentary Death Row Uncut.

Although the song and video were highly popular, and debuted a short time after release of the Oliver Stone film Natural Born Killers, the song did not appear in the film or on its soundtrack.

It did, however, appear in the 2011 film Bridesmaids starring Kristen Wiig.

== Cover versions ==
In 1996, the song was covered by Christ Analogue for the electro-industrial various artists compilation Operation Beatbox.

In 2014, the song was covered by the American metal band Conducting from the Grave and released as a free single. This was the final release from the band before their break-up.

== Track listing ==
- CD single
1. "Natural Born Killaz" (Radio Edit) – 4:16
2. "Natural Born Killaz" (Video Edit) – 6:33
3. "Natural Born Killaz" (LP Version) – 4:52
4. "What Would You Do" (featuring Tha Dogg Pound) (LP Version) – 5:09
- 12" vinyl
1. "Natural Born Killaz" (Radio Edit) – 4:16
2. "Natural Born Killaz" (LP Version) – 4:52
3. "U Better Recognize" (featuring Sam Sneed) (LP Version) – 3:55
