= The Sequence =

American hip hop group

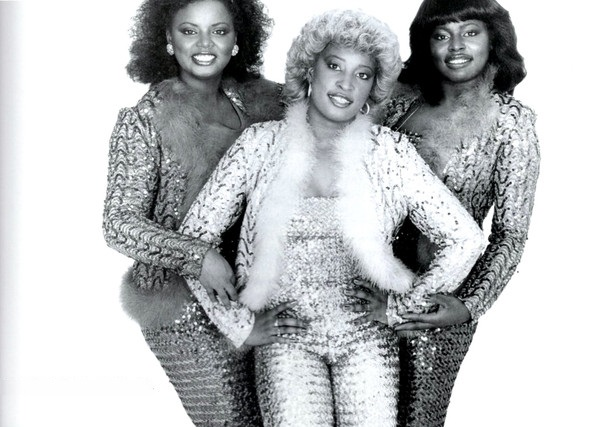
- The Sequence, 1980 (left to right: Cheryl the Pearl, Blondy, and Angie B.)

Background information
- Origin: Columbia, South Carolina, U.S.
- Genres: Old school hip-hop; funk; rap
- Years active: 1979–1985; 2011; 2019; 2021
- Label: Sugar Hill
- Past members: Angie B.; Blondy; Cheryl the Pearl

The Sequence was an American hip hop group formed in Columbia, South Carolina in 1979, composed of Angie B., Blondy, and Cheryl the Pearl. The group rose to fame with the 1979 single, "Funk You Up", which was the first rap hit performed by women and one of the first commercially successful hip hop singles. Their debut album, Sugar Hill Presents The Sequence (1980), was released on Sugar Hill Records and was the first hip hop record on vinyl released by an all-female act.

In the period between the release of their first two albums, the group co-wrote and performed on songs performed by their labelmates, including "Let's Dance (Make Your Body Move)" by West Street Mob. Their follow-up self-titled album was released in 1982 to limited commercial success. The group's final album The Sequence Party was released in 1983.

The Sequence have reportedly sold a million records worldwide, making them the first female hip hop act to sell over a million records.

== History ==
=== Formation and early years ===
As childhood friends, Angela Brown, Gwendolyn Chisolm, and Cheryl Cook grew up in the Saxon Homes Projects in Columbia, South Carolina. Brown and Chisolm sang in their church choir and also participated in local dance competitions. They attended and graduated from C.A. Johnson High School. By the age of nineteen, Chisolm was working as an employee at a local Super Saver Foods. Her manager promised her tickets and backstage passes to a concert by The Sugarhill Gang for her twentieth birthday. Chisolm arrived at the concert and found out that there were no tickets set aside for her or her group mates. However, the group were invited backstage by The Sugarhill Gang’s manager as he began flirting with Brown. While backstage, the group met Sylvia Robinson who was the CEO of hip hop label Sugar Hill Records. They auditioned for Robinson who signed them to the label as their first female act.

=== 1979–1981: Sugarhill presents The Sequence ===
In 1979, the group adopted stage names: Angie B. (Angela Brown), Blondy (Gwendolyn Chisolm), and Cheryl the Pearl (Cheryl Cook); and began recording their debut album. They released their debut single "Funk You Up" in December 1979. The song became one of the first original hip hop songs to be released without sampling. "Funk You Up" peaked at number fifteen on the Hot Soul Singles. Shortly after the release of the song, The Sequence went on tour with The Sugarhill Gang. In 1980, The Sequence released their debut album Sugarhill presents The Sequence, which received positive reviews from music critics. Later that year, they released two more singles: "Monster Jam" and "And You Know That". The album's third single "Funky Sound (Tear the Roof Off)", a remake of the single "Give Up the Funk (Tear the Roof off the Sucker)" (1976) by Parliament, peaked at number forty-three on the Hot Soul Singles chart.

In 1981, the group began writing and recording background vocals for other music acts on Sugar Hill Records. They wrote and provided background vocals for "Sing a Simple Song" and "Let's Dance (Make Your Body Move)" by West Street Mob, the latter of which peaked at number eighty-eight on Billboard's Hot 100 chart and number eighteen on the Hot Soul Singles. Cheryl the Pearl co-wrote "8th Wonder" (performed by The Sugarhill Gang) and "Let Your Mind Be Free" (performed by Ferrari).

=== 1982–1985: The Sequence and The Sequence Party ===
In 1982, The Sequence released their self-titled second album, which peaked at number fifty-one on the Black LPs chart. The album featured a mixture of hip hop songs and ballads. The album's first single "I Don't Need Your Love (Part One)" peaked at number forty on Billboard's Hot Soul Singles chart. Following the release of the single, the group toured once again with The Sugarhill Gang. Following the conclusion of the tour, they began recording their third album. In late 1982, they released a single titled "Here Comes the Bride". In 1983, they released their third album The Sequence Party. The Sequence followed up with the release of their single "I Just Want to Know". In 1985, they released their final singles: "Funk You Up '85" and "Control".

== Disbandment and aftermath ==
In 1985, the group refused to renew their recording contract after a dispute with Sugar Hill Records CEO Sylvia Robinson. The group's dispute with the label stemmed from not being paid their royalties from the songs they wrote and recorded. The group also felt like the money from their royalties were being used to support other musical acts on Sugar Hill Records. In addition to the royalty dispute, Angie B. refused to renew her contract without a ten-thousand dollar advance, which lead to an internal dispute amongst the group members. The group ultimately disbanded and went their separate career paths. Blondy worked at a telemarketing firm in Hackensack and also continue to work with Sugar Hill Records co-founder Joe Robinson. She left Sugar Hill Records after witnessing Robinson being pistol-whipped during a closed-door meeting. Cheryl the Pearl left the music industry to pursue a career in home health care. Angie B. pursued a solo music career and also began working at Kiss-FM radio station in New York. In 1985, Angie B. began performing as Angie B. Stone and later simply Angie Stone, carrying the last name of her first husband Rodney "Lil' Rodney C" Stone. In 1988, she formed a music group called Vertical Hold. The group released two albums A Matter of Time (1993) and Head First (1995) before disbanding in 1996.

In July 2008, Angie Stone and Cheryl the Pearl reunited and performed "Funk You Up" at the annual Essence Festival. Stone and Cheryl the Pearl also performed "Rapper's Delight" alongside The Sugarhill Gang. In September 2011, Blondy and Cheryl the Pearl reunited and released a single entitled "On Our Way to the Movies"; credited as "The Sequence featuring Blondy and Cheryl the Pearl". Angie was unable to record on the song due to her contractual obligations to Stax Records. In October 2016, Angie and Blondy performed "Funk You Up" at the Capital Jazz Cruise. In August 2018, the group were interviewed by WLTX on the current state of hip hop music. In August 2019, The Sequence reunited and performed "Funk You Up" at the Neighborhood-to-Neighborhood (N2N) Festival. In 2020, Cheryl the Pearl released a single "Your Way My Way" on her own record label Black Bottom Entertainment. The group reunited for a final single titled "Say What", which featured Stone's son Swayvo Twain. On March 1, 2025, Stone was killed in a car collision near Montgomery, Alabama, at the age of 63. Chisholm died following a brief illness in Atlanta, on April 6, 2026, at the age of 67, leaving Cook as the lone surviving member.

== Legacy ==
The Sequence have been recognized as the first female hip hop act in music history. Their debut single "Funk You Up" has become the source of heavy music sampling. Elements of "Funk You Up" have been used by Dr. Dre for his 1995 single "Keep Their Heads Ringin'", 1997 "Whatever" remix by En Vogue, 2003 "Love of My Life Worldwide" by Erykah Badu, 2014 "Uptown Funk" by Mark Ronson and Bruno Mars. In December 2017, the group filed a Federal Copyright Infringement claim against Bruno Mars, claiming that "Uptown Funk" makes use of their 1970s hit "Funk You Up".

In 2016, The Sequence voiced their frustration after feeling snubbed by the VH1 Hip Hop Honors: All Hail the Queens. VH1 came under fire as they credited Salt-N-Pepa as "the first true female hip-hop group", despite The Sequence debuting in 1979.

From April 25, 2026 to June 17, 2026, Nashville's National Museum of African American Music held a featured exhibit on the Sequence. Portions of the featured exhibition were drawn from Chisolm's unreleased memoir The First Blonde in the Hip Hop Game and final interviews.

== Discography ==
=== Albums ===
Title	Album details	Peak chart positions
Title	Album details	US R&B/ Hip Hop
Sugarhill presents The Sequence	Released: 1980; Label: Sugar Hill Records; Formats: LP	—
The Sequence	Released: 1982; Label: Sugar Hill Records; Formats: LP	51
The Sequence Party	Released: 1983; Label: Sugar Hill Records; Formats: LP	—

=== Compilations ===
- Funky Sound (1995), P-Vine
- The Best of the Sequence (1996), Deep Beats
- Monster Jam: Back to Old School, Vol. 2 (2000), Sequel

=== Singles ===
List of singles as lead artist, with selected chart positions and certifications, showing year released and album name
Title	Year	Peak chart positions			Album
Title	Year	US R&B/Hip Hop	US Cashbox	US Cashbox Contemporary	Album
"Funk You Up"	1979	15	24	—	Non-album single
"And You Know That"	1980	—	—	—	Sugarhill presents The Sequence
"Funky Sound (Tear the Roof Off)"	1981	39	—	—	Sugarhill presents The Sequence
"Simon Says"	1982	—	—	—	Sugarhill presents The Sequence
"I Don't Need Your Love"	1982	40	—	35	The Sequence
"Here Comes the Bride"	1982	—	—	—	The Sequence Party
"I Just Want to Know"	1983	—	—	—	The Sequence Party
"Funk You Up '85"	1985	—	—	—	Non-album single
"Control"	1985	—	—	—	Non-album single
"On Our Way to the Movies"	2011	—	—	—	Non-album single
"Say What" (featuring Swayvo Twain)	2021	—	—	—	Non-album single
