= Gwendolyn Chisolm =

American musician (1959–2026)

- Born: Gwendolyn Yvonne Chisolm; October 20, 1959; Columbia, South Carolina, U.S.
- Died: April 6, 2026 (aged 66); Montgomery County, Alabama, U.S.
- Other name: Blondie
- Occupations: Rapper-songwriter; actress
- Years active: 1979–2026
- Musical career
- Genre: Hip-hop
- Instrument: Vocals
- Works: The Sequence discography
- Label: Sugar Hill Records
- Formerly of: The Sequence

Gwendolyn Chisolm (October 20, 1959 – April 6, 2026), also known by the stage name Blondy, was an American rapper-songwriter, singer, and actress. With a career spanning more than four decades, she has been credited with revolutionizing the sound of hip-hop.

Originally known as Blondy, she rose to fame in 1979 as a member of The Sequence, the first female music act in hip hop music. Aside from her work with The Sequence, she also performed background vocals on West Street Mob's debut eponymous album, including the US R&B Top 20 hit "Let's Dance (Make Your Body Move)". Following the disbandment of The Sequence, Chisolm pursued careers outside of entertainment. She starred in independent film Someone's Coming to Dinner in 2018.

Over the course of her final years, Chisolm reunited and performed periodically with The Sequence. With the group, she has sold over a million records.

== Early life ==
Gwendolyn Yvonne Chisolm was born in Columbia, South Carolina, to Alonzo Chisolm Sr. and Virginia Scott (née Young). At a young age, her parents divorced and her mother remarried to Samuel Scott Sr. Her siblings included four brothers and two sisters. She graduated from C.A. Johnson High School in 1977.

== Career ==
=== 1979–1985: Career beginnings and The Sequence ===
In 1979, Chisolm formed a female hip-hop group known as The Sequence. Brown, along with her childhood friends and group mates Angela Brown and Cheryl Cook, attended a concert by hip-hop group The Sugarhill Gang. The group made their way backstage and met Sylvia Robinson who was the CEO of hip hop label Sugar Hill Records. They auditioned for Robinson who signed them to the label as their first female act. While in the group, Chisolm adopted the stage name Blondy. They released their debut single "Funk You Up" in December 1979. The song became one of the first original hip hop songs to be released without sampling. "Funk You Up" peaked at number fifteen on the Hot Soul Singles. In 1980, The Sequence released their debut album Sugarhill presents The Sequence, which received positive reviews from music critics.

In 1981, the group began doing session work for other music acts on Sugar Hill Records. They wrote and provided background vocals for "Sing a Simple Song" and "Let's Dance (Make Your Body Move)" by West Street Mob, the latter of which peaked at number eighty-eight on Billboard's Hot 100 chart and number eighteen on the Hot Soul Singles. In 1982, The Sequence released their self-titled second album, which peaked at number fifty-one on the Black LPs chart. The album's first single "I Don't Need Your Love (Part One)" peaked at number forty on Billboard's Hot Soul Singles chart. In 1983, they released their third album The Sequence Party. The Sequence followed up with the release of their single "I Just Want to Know". In 1985, they released their final singles: "Funk It Up '85" and "Control".

In 1985, the group refused to renew their recording contract after a dispute with Sugar Hill Records CEO Sylvia Robinson. The group's dispute with the label stemmed from not being paid their royalties from the songs they wrote and recorded. The group also felt like the money from their royalties were being used to support other musical acts on Sugar Hill Records. Following the group's disbandment, Blondy worked at a telemarketing firm in Hackensack and also continue to work with Sugar Hill Records co-founder Joe Robinson. She left Sugar Hill Records after witnessing Robinson being pistol-whipped during a closed-door meeting.

=== Later career ===
In September 2011, Blondy and Cheryl the Pearl reunited and release a single entitled "On Our Way to the Movies"; credited as "The Sequence featuring Blondy and Cheryl the Pearl". In October 2016, Angie and Blondy performed "Funk You Up" at the Capital Jazz Cruise. In the same month, she starred in the independent film Someone's Coming to Dinner. In August 2018, the group were interviewed by WLTX on the current state of hip hop music. In August 2019, Blondy reunited with the Sequence and performed "Funk You Up" at the Neighborhood-to-Neighborhood (N2N) Festival. In 2025, she received an honorary Doctor of Music degree from Leaders Esteem Christian Bible University.

== Death ==
Undisclosed to the public, Chisolm had a brief health battle with sepsis. On April 5, 2026, Chisolm went into septic shock and died on April 6, 2026. Her death was announced by two days later by her sister Monica Scott. At the time of her death, she was completing her memoir titled The First Blonde in the Hip Hop Game, which was planned to be self-published with the help of donation via GoFundMe. She was also collaborating with Nashville's National Museum of African American Music to present a permanent exhibit featuring The Sequence.
