= Little Runaway (Stone City Band song) =

Song by Stone City Band

from the album In 'n' Out
- A-side: "Little Runaway"
- B-side: "South American Sneeze"
- Released: 1980
- Length: 3:50
- Label: Gordy Records G 7182F
- Composer: (R. James)
- Producer: Rick James

USA chronology
"Strut Your Stuff" (1980)	"Little Runaway" (1980)	"Freaky" (1981)

"Little Runaway" was a 1980 single for the Stone City Band. It was a chart hit for them that year.

== Background ==
Working with producer, Rick James, the Stone City Band recorded "Little Runaway" which was written by James. It was backed with another James composition, "South American Sneeze". The arrangements for both sides were by Rick James and Daniel Le Melle. The recordings were released on single, Gordy G 7182F.

== Reception ==
The song was a Record World Single Pick in the B.O.S./Pop section for the week of 3 May 1980. It was given a positive review with the reviewer pointing out that the vocals were shared by Rick James and Levi Ruffin. Referring to the record as a funky dance spin, the reviewer also said that the syndrums peppering the kinetic rhythm and the chorus which was gospel-like added class.

It was one of the Cash Box Singles to Watch, and was given a glowing review in the 17 May issue of the publication. Besides mentioning the horns, handclaps, syndrums and a riveting bass line, the reviewer called it a "party hearty B/C-dance cut" and said that the female harmonies provided the perfect backdrop for the street tough lead and that it would ride the groove right on to the black contemporary playlists.

== Charts ==
"Little Runaway" debuted at No. 93 in the Cash Box Black Contemporary Top 100 chart for the week of 31 May. The single was at no. 78 for the week of 21 June.

The single debuted at No. 86 in the Billboard Hot Soul Singles chart for the week of 31 May. It peaked at No. 66 for the week of 14 June and held that position for another week.

For the week of 21 June, the single debuted at No. 67 in the Record World Black Oriented Singles chart. It peaked at No. 65 the following week.
