= Keep Their Heads Ringin' =

Single by Dr. Dre

from the album Friday (soundtrack)
- B-side: "Take a Hit"
- Released: March 7, 1995
- Recorded: 1994
- Studio: Dr. Dre's home studio (Los Angeles)
- Genre: West Coast hip-hop; gangsta rap; G-funk; R&B
- Length: 5:06
- Label: Priority; EMI
- Songwriters: Andre Young; James Anderson; Samuel Anderson; Angela Brown; Gwendolyn Chisolm; Cheryl Cook; Sylvia Robinson
- Producers: Dr. Dre; Sam Sneed

Dr. Dre singles chronology
"Natural Born Killaz" (1994)	"Keep Their Heads Ringin'" (1995)	"California Love" (1995)

Music video
- "Keep Their Heads Ringin'" on YouTube

"Keep Their Heads Ringin'" is a song by American rapper and producer Dr. Dre featuring vocalist Nanci Fletcher. It was the first single released from the soundtrack of the 1995 movie Friday, starring Dre's former N.W.A bandmate, Ice Cube, and Chris Tucker. Although the soundtrack was released on Priority Records, Death Row Records still owns the masters to the song. In the United States, the song topped the Hot Rap Tracks chart and peaked at numbers ten and 17 on the Billboard Hot 100 and Cash Box Top 100. It was certified gold by the RIAA on May 10, 1995, and sold 700,000 copies domestically. It interpolates "Funk You Up" by The Sequence from their 1980 single released under Sugar Hill. F. Gary Gray directed the music video for the song.

The song was co-produced by Sam Sneed.

== Critical reception ==
Dr. Bayyan from Cash Box wrote, "Well, there is no doubt that the patented "Dre funk" is present, but there's one aspect that fans will notice about this single. He concentrates more on his improved lyrical delivery rather than on killin' niggas and cheekin' ho's. Dre is one of the few rappers that doesn't have to tone down his hardcore image to gain commercial status."

Cathi Unsworth from Melody Maker said, "Dr Dre practices what he preaches in one long reeling reefer high that pulses like the first narcotic rush that brings on the weekend. A smoothly subversive operator." Keith Cameron from NME commented, "The vibes from the crib are up to the regulatory slink norm, the gel chorus keeps matters literal ("Ring ding dong/A ring-a-ding-ding-ding-dong"), and regardless of how good the film is, it's hard to imagine Cube coming up with a line as chucklesome as Dre's: "Your chances of jackin' me are slim, Gl'Cos I rock from summer 'til Santa comes down the chimney"."

== Music video ==
The accompanying music video for "Keep Their Heads Ringin'" was directed by American film director, film producer, and music video director F. Gary Gray and takes place in a plane hangar. The video contains cameo appearances from the actors of the movie Friday including Chris Tucker, Faizon Love, Paula Jai Parker and Nia Long. New Line offered the clip to theaters to play right before showings of Friday. It also appears as a bonus feature on the VHS and DVD releases of the film.

== Track listing ==
- CD single / 12" vinyl
1. "Keep Their Heads Ringin'" (LP Version) — 5:01
2. "Keep Their Heads Ringin'" (Instrumental) — 4:57
3. "Take a Hit" (by Mack 10) (LP Version) — 4:34
4. "Take a Hit" (by Mack 10) (Instrumental) — 4:34
- US 12" vinyl
1. "Keep Their Heads Ringin'" (Radio Version) — 5:02
2. "Keep Their Heads Ringin'" (LP Version) — 5:01
3. "Keep Their Heads Ringin'" (Instrumental) — 4:57

== Personnel ==
- Co-producer - Sam Sneed
- Engineer - Tommy D. Daugherty and Keston Wright
- Keyboards - Stu "Fingas" Bullard
- Producer - Dr. Dre
- Chorus Sample - KRS-One
- Lead vocals - Nanci Fletcher
- Background Vocals - Nanci Fletcher, Danette Williams, Barbara Wilson, Dorothy Coleman
- Video director - F. Gary Gray
- Actors - Chris Tucker, Nia Long and Tiny Lister
- Angie Stone is credited for writing the song due to her writing to "Funk You Up". She is credited as A. Brown in the credits of the song since she did not go by Angie Stone at the time she recorded "Funk You Up". Angela Brown is Angie Stone's birth name.

== Charts ==
=== Weekly charts ===
Chart (1995)	Peak position
Australia (ARIA)	93
Belgium (Ultratop 50 Wallonia)	15
France (SNEP)	29
Germany (GfK)	23
Netherlands (Dutch Top 40)	11
Netherlands (Single Top 100)	15
New Zealand (Recorded Music NZ)	3
Sweden (Sverigetopplistan)	7
Switzerland (Schweizer Hitparade)	7
UK Singles (Official Charts)	25
UK Hip Hop/R&B (Official Charts)	3
US Billboard Hot 100	10
US Dance Club Songs (Billboard)	4
US Hot R&B/Hip-Hop Songs (Billboard)	10
US Hot Rap Songs (Billboard)	1
US Maxi-Singles Sales (Billboard)	4
US Rhythmic Airplay (Billboard)	13
US Cash Box Top 100	17

=== Year-end charts ===
Chart (1995)	Position
Belgium (Ultratop Wallonia)	60
Europe (Eurochart Hot 100)	98
France (SNEP)	72
Germany (Official German Charts)	82
Netherlands (Dutch Top 40)	83
New Zealand (Recorded Music NZ)	38
Sweden (Sverigetopplistan)	38
US Billboard Hot 100	53
US Hot R&B/Hip-Hop Songs (Billboard)	42

== Certifications ==
Region	Certification	Certified units/sales
New Zealand (RMNZ)	2× Platinum	60,000^{‡}
United Kingdom (BPI)	Silver	200,000^{‡}
United States (RIAA)	Gold	700,000
^{‡} Sales+streaming figures based on certification alone.
