= Snoop's Upside Ya Head =

Single by Snoop Doggy Dogg featuring Charlie Wilson

from the album Tha Doggfather
- Released: September 14, 1996
- Recorded: 1996
- Genre: G-funk
- Length: 4:28 (album version); 5:17 (video)
- Label: Death Row; Interscope; MCA
- Songwriter: Calvin Broadus
- Producer: DJ Pooh

Snoop Doggy Dogg singles chronology
"What Would You Do?" (1994)	"Snoop's Upside Ya Head" (1996)	"Never Leave Me Alone" (1996)

Charlie Wilson singles chronology
"Stomp" (1996)	"Snoop's Upside Ya Head" (1996)	"Vapors" (1997)

Music video
- "Snoop's Upside Ya Head" on YouTube

"Snoop's Upside Ya Head" is a song by American rapper Snoop Doggy Dogg, released as the first single from his second album, Tha Doggfather (1996). The song heavily samples "I Don't Believe You Want to Get Up and Dance (Oops)" by the Gap Band and features new vocals from Gap Band's lead singer Charlie Wilson. It was released as a single by Death Row, Interscope and MCA in the UK on September 14, 1996 and was Snoop's second European hit. The single was released one day after Death Row labelmate Tupac Shakur died from injuries sustained in a drive by shooting the week prior.

== Critical reception ==
Everett True from Melody Maker wrote in his review of the single, "Slick, smooth and sinuous cover of The Gap Band. Lacks bite."

== Music video ==
In the accompanying music video for "Snoop's Upside Ya Head", an imaginary execution takes place where Snoop Doggy Dogg manages to escape from the electric chair (It refers to the end of Snoop's real life murder trial by verdict of not guilty). After that protesters are outside some with signs stating "we love you Snoop" and others stating "fry 'em". Later Snoop saves a news reporter and drives away in his car and manages to escape the cops briefly. Apparently the news reporter helped Snoop escape as shown briefly in the music video.

Later he performs in an outdoor concert for his awaiting fans and in the progress gets arrested by the cops and is put back in jail. While in jail he performs again for the inmates later showing Snoop in 2021; still an inmate rocking the jail. It stars Vincent Schiavelli as the prison governor, Wilson as the prison guard, and Uncle Junebug as the old Snoop in prison. DJ Pooh makes a cameo appearance as a DJ in the prison. The music video was released in November 1996.

== Track listing ==
- UK 12" single

A1. "Snoop's Upside Ya Head" (Album Version) (featuring Charlie Wilson) — 4:29
B1. "Snoop's Upside Ya Head" (Radio Edit) (featuring Charlie Wilson) — 4:29
B2. "Snoop's Upside Ya Head" (Instrumental) — 4:29

== Charts ==
Chart performance for "Snoop's Upside Ya Head"
Chart (1996)	Peak position
Australia (ARIA)	46
Belgium (Ultratop 50 Flanders)	8
Germany (GfK)	34
New Zealand (Recorded Music NZ)	7
Netherlands (Single Top 100)	32
Sweden (Sverigetopplistan)	39
Scotland Singles (OCC)	24
UK Dance (OCC)	1
UK Hip Hop/R&B (OCC)	3
UK Singles (OCC)	12
US R&B/Hip-Hop Airplay (Billboard)	37
US Rap Songs (Billboard)	5

== Certifications ==
Certifications for "Snoop's Upside Ya Head"
Region	Certification	Certified units/sales
New Zealand (RMNZ)	Gold	5,000^{*}
^{*} Sales figures based on certification alone.
