= Murder Was the Case (song) =

1993 single by Snoop Doggy Dogg

Song by Snoop Doggy Dogg featuring Dat Nigga Daz

from the album Doggystyle
- Released: 1993
- Genre: West Coast hip hop; gangsta rap; G-funk; horrorcore
- Length: 3:26
- Label: Death Row; Interscope
- Songwriters: Calvin Broadus; Dat Nigga Daz
- Producer: Dr. Dre

"Murder Was the Case (remix)"

Single by Snoop Doggy Dogg

from the album Murder Was the Case
- Released: 1994
- Recorded: 1993–1994
- Genre: G-funk; gangsta rap; horrorcore
- Length: 4:20
- Label: Death Row; Interscope
- Songwriter: Calvin Broadus
- Producer: Dr. Dre

Snoop Doggy Dogg singles chronology
"Afro Puffs" (1994)	"Murder Was the Case (remix)" (1994)	"What Would You Do?" (1994)

Music video
- "Murder Was the Case" on YouTube

"Murder Was the Case" is a song by rapper Snoop Dogg from his debut album Doggystyle. The song was remixed for the 1994 soundtrack Murder Was the Case.

== Chart performance ==
Chart (1994)	Peak position
US Hot 100 Airplay (Billboard)	67
US Rhythmic Airplay (Billboard)	36
