= Here I Am (Joya album) =

Album by Joya

Studio album by Joya
- Released: June 20, 1995
- Recorded: 1994, 1995
- Genre: Soul, hip hop, R&B
- Length: 47:37
- Label: Atlas/A&M Records
- Producer: Derek Jenkins, Vincent Herbert; Dwayne Richardson

Joya chronology
Here I Am (1995)	Pages from the Book of Life: Chapter 1 (2001)

Here I Am is the debut studio album by American R&B/hip-hop artist Joya, released on June 20, 1995, on the label A&M Records. The album's sound is a blend of R&B, soul and hip hop; featured are the minor R&B hit singles – "I Like What You're Doing to Me", which reached number 46 on the U.S. Billboard Hot R&B Singles chart, and "Gettin' off on You", which peaked at number 67. The CD single release for "Gettin' off on You" was packaged with a condom, emphasizing the single's racy lyrics.

== Track listing ==
No.	Title	Length
1.	"Joya (Intro)"	1:32
2.	"I Like What You're Doing to Me"	5:09
3.	"Takin' Care of Business"	4:01
4.	"Love You all Ova"	4:09
5.	"Here I Am"	4:22
6.	"Gettin' off on You"	4:50
7.	"Do It Like This, Do It Like That"	5:17
8.	"Willing and Waiting"	4:29
9.	"I Just Can't Help Myself"	3:41
10.	"Shouldn't Be Hard to Tell"	3:59
11.	"Joya (Outro)"	2:38
12.	"Takin' Care of Business (Queen's Mix)"	4:00

== Personnel ==
- Joya – Lead vocals, background vocals
- Vincent Herbert – Executive producer
- Arte Skye – Engineer
- Dave Collins – Mastered

== Charts ==
=== Singles ===
Year	Title	US R&B
1995	"I Like What You're Doing to Me"	46
1995	"Gettin' off on You"	67
