= Afro Puffs =

Single by The Lady of Rage

from the album Above the Rim (soundtrack)
- Released: July 2, 1994
- Genre: Gangsta rap; g-funk; hardcore hip hop
- Length: 4:50; 8:05 extended mix; 5:43 G-Funk Mix
- Label: Death Row; Interscope; Atlantic
- Songwriters: Robin Allen; Delmar Arnaud
- Producers: Dr. Dre; Dat Nigga Daz

Snoop Doggy Dogg singles chronology
"Doggy Dogg World" (1994)	"Afro Puffs" (1994)	"Murder Was the Case" (1994)

Music video
- "Afro Puffs" on YouTube

"Afro Puffs" is a song by American rapper the Lady of Rage, released in July 1994 as the first single from the Death Row labeled Above the Rim: The Soundtrack and features uncredited vocals from Snoop Dogg. It peaked at numbers 57 and 75 on the US Billboard Hot 100 and Cash Box Top 100 charts. The extended, video, and instrumental version on the single samples "Superman Lover" (Intro) by Johnny "Guitar" Watson. The original song samples "Love That Will Not Die", also by Watson. The term that the title refers to is a hairstyle in which the hair is tied into ball-shaped masses at the top or sides of the head. "Afro Puffs" was performed live at the 1995 Source Awards, as well as at the 2008 BET Hip Hop Awards.

== Track listing ==
No.	Title	Length
1.	"Radio version"	4:49
2.	"Extended remix"	8:01
3.	"G-Funk remix"	5:20
4.	"LP version"	4:49
5.	"Instrumental"	3:05

== Charts ==
Chart (1994)	Peak position
US Billboard Hot 100	57
US Hot R&B/Hip-Hop Songs (Billboard)	31
US Dance Club Songs (Billboard)	5
US Hot Rap Songs (Billboard)	5
US Hot R&B/Hip-Hop Airplay (Billboard)	33
US Cash Box Top 100	75
