= Strut Your Stuff (Stone City Band song) =

Song by Stone City Band

from the album In 'n' Out
- A-side: "Strut Your Stuff"
- B-side: "F.I.M.A. (Funk In Mama Afrika)"
- Released: 1980
- Length: 4:00
- Label: Gordy Records
- Composers: L. Ruffin, Jr.

USA chronology
"Strut Your Stuff" (1980)	"Little Runaway" (1980)

"Strut Your Stuff" was a 1980 single for the Stone City Band. It was a hit for them that year, charting in the United States and in England.

== Background ==
"Strut Your Stuff" was from the Stone City Band 1980 album, In 'n' Out. It was released that year as a single on Gordy G 7179F.

It was released in the UK on Motown TMG 1181 in April 1980.

The song shouldn't be confused with the song of the same name which was a hit for Young & Company the following year.

== Reception ==
The single was reviewed in the 9 February issue of Record World. It was also one of the sleepers for that week. The reviewer mentioned the depths that the bass intro went into and how the chorus said it all. The reviewer finished off with calling it pure motion music for BOS-pop.

"Strut Your Stuff" was in the Singles to Watch section of Cash Box, 9 February issue. Referring to the music as polished funk, the reviewer also mentioned the bright chorus by the female singers and gruff male vocals complementing them. The reviewer also mentioned the horns, percussion and weaving bass, and finished off with referring to it as exceptional B/C fare.

== Charts ==
=== US ===
The single entered the Billboard Soul Singles chart on 3 August 1980. It peaked at No. 48 during its nine-week run.

=== UK ===
For the week of 12 April 1980, "Little Runaway" / "Strut Your Stuff" debuted at No. 89 in the Record Mirror UK Disco chart. For the week of 3 May, "Little Runaway" / "Strut Your Stuff" reached its peak at No. 69 on the UK Disco Top 90 chart.
