= Funk You Up =

Single by The Sequence
- Released: December 1979
- Recorded: November 1979
- Studio: Sugar Hill Studios
- Genre: Old-school hip-hop
- Length: 6:30 (single version); 10:30 (12" version)
- Label: Sugar Hill Records
- Songwriters: Angela Brown, Cheryl Cooke, Gwendolyn Chisolm, Sylvia Robinson
- Producer: Sylvia Robinson

The Sequence singles chronology
"Funk You Up" (1979)	"Monster Jam" (1980)

"Funk You Up" is a 1979 old school hip hop song by American female hip hop group The Sequence. The song was released in December 1979 by Sugar Hill Records. It was written by The Sequence members Angie B., Blondy, and Cheryl the Pearl and produced by Sylvia Robinson. "Funk You Up" peaked at number fifteen on the US Hot Soul Singles chart. The song was the first hip hop song to be released by female hip hop act. "Funk You Up" is also the second single to be released on Sugar Hill Records, following the release of "Rapper's Delight" by the Sugarhill Gang.

"Funk You Up" has become one of the most frequently sampled songs in music history, most notably in hip hop music.

== Commercial performance ==
"Funk You Up" peaked at number fifteen on the US Hot Soul Singles chart. "Funk You Up" debuted at number 83 on the Cashbox Top 100 Singles chart during the week of December 22, 1979. After eleven weeks on the chart, the song peaked at number 24 during the week of March 1, 1980. The song held the spot for two weeks, Having spent sixteen weeks on the chart, "Funk You Up" dropped down to number 96 during its final week, the week of April 5, 1980.

== Sampling ==
The opening guitar and synth-drums were sampled in Organized Rhyme's single, "Check the O.R." Dr. Dre used interpolations for his 1995 hit "Keep Their Heads Ringin'". In 1997, En Vogue sampled the song on their remix of "Whatever" featuring Ol' Dirty Bastard. In 2003, Erykah Badu released a remix of her song "Love of My Life (An Ode to Hip-Hop)", re-titled "Love of My Life (Worldwide)". The remixed version of the song featured additional rap verses from Queen Latifah, Bahamadia, and former Sequence member Angie Stone. In 2022, Katy Perry released a song titled "Did Somebody Say", which featured in an advertisement for food delivery service Just Eat. The song interpolated "Funk You Up".

== Legal disputes ==
In 2016, The Sequence claimed that Mark Ronson's "Uptown Funk" infringed their single "Funk You Up". They decided to sue a year later.

== Charts ==
=== Weekly charts ===
Chart (1979–1980)	Peak position
US Cash Box Top 100	24
US Hot R&B/Hip-Hop Songs (Billboard)	15
