= Murder Was the Case =

Soundtrack album by various artists
- Released: October 18, 1994
- Recorded: 1994
- Studio: Can-Am Studios (Tarzana, Los Angeles)
- Genres: West Coast hip-hop; gangsta rap; g-funk; hardcore hip-hop; horrorcore; R&B
- Length: 68:30
- Labels: Death Row; Interscope; Atlantic
- Producers: Suge Knight (exec.); Dr. Dre (exec.); Dat Nigga Daz; Soopafly; DJ Quik; DeVante Swing; Sam Sneed; Big Wy; George "G-One" Archie; Kevin Lewis; Lil' Stretch; Marc McWilliams; San Man

Death Row Records chronology
Above the Rim (1994)	Murder Was the Case (1994)	Death Row Greatest Hits (1996)

Singles from Murder Was the Case
- 1. "Murder Was the Case" Released: 1994; 2. "U Better Recognize" Released: 1994; 3. "One More Day" / "What Would You Do?" Released: 1994; 4. "Natural Born Killaz" Released: December 10, 1994; 5. "Woman to Woman" Released: December 18, 1994

Murder Was the Case is a 1994 short film and soundtrack album starring and performed by Snoop Doggy Dogg. The 18 minute film was directed by Dr. Dre and Fab Five Freddy and chronicles the fictional death of Snoop Dogg and his resurrection after making a deal with the Devil. The film's title comes from Snoop's song of the same name from his debut album, Doggystyle, which had been released a year earlier.

The single "What Would You Do?" by Tha Dogg Pound was included on the Natural Born Killers soundtrack and was nominated for the Grammy Award for Best Rap Performance by a Duo or Group in the 38th Annual Grammy Awards in 1996. The album was re-released with a bonus DVD containing three music videos on July 11, 2006.

Tupac Shakur was paid $200,000 by Death Row Records owner Suge Knight to record a song for the album, but the track ("Life's So Hard" featuring Snoop Doggy Dogg) was never used on the official soundtrack release; it was later released on the soundtrack for his posthumously released film, Gang Related.

== Critical reception ==
Professional ratings
Review scores
Source	Rating
Allmusic	4.5/5 stars

- Rolling Stone (12/29/94-1/12/95, p. 178) - "...[It] isn't the trailblazer that Dre's The Chronic was last year. But it is rap very nearly as strong. Featuring West Coast stalwarts...and new discoveries..., Dre and Dat Nigga Daz present gangsta- and R&B-infected fare that slams..."
- Entertainment Weekly (11/11/94, p. 76) - "...confirms...Dr. Dre as the new king of pop. In addition to the ominous remix of Snoop's title song, Dre reunites with Ice Cube...Dre's G-funk sound may be the hardest in the land, but it's also the most gut-wrenchingly soulful..." - Rating: A
- Q magazine (1/95, p. 258) - 3 Stars - Good - "...While most ears will be tuned to the bile'n'beats of "Natural Born Killaz"...the best track here is from Snoop's young protege, Nate Dogg....One of West Coast rap's more imaginative albums."
- The Source (1/95, p. 85) - 4 Stars - Slammin' - "...while Jodeci duets with Tha Dogg Pound and an all-star cast to try their hand at the G-Funk sound, Dre begins plotting his next move...heavy-metal bass meets chunky keyboards..."
- NME (12/24/94, p. 23) - Ranked #8 in NME's list of the 10 best compilation albums of 1994.
- NME (10/15/94, p. 53) - 7 - Very Good - "...anyone expecting this to signal Dre's decline is kidding themselves. Murder Was the Case shows the old dogg has plenty of new tricks..."

== Commercial performance ==
In the United States, on the chart dated November 5, 1994, Murder Was the Case debuted on the Billboard 200 at number one, powered by first week sales 329,000 units. The album opened at the top spot of the R&B/Hip-Hop Albums chart.

The following week it stayed on top with 197,000 copies sold and was certified Gold. The album was certified platinum on December 6, 1994 and it was certified 2× platinum with 2,030,000 copies sold on April 5, 1995.

== Track listing ==
No.	Title	Writer(s)	Producer(s)	Length
1.	"Murder Was the Case (Remix)" (Snoop Doggy Dogg)	C. Broadus	Dr. Dre	4:20
2.	"Natural Born Killaz" (Dr. Dre & Ice Cube)	J. Anderson; O. Jackson	Dr. Dre; Sam Sneed (co.)	4:51
3.	"What Would U Do?" (Tha Dogg Pound featuring Snoop Doggy Dogg)	C. Broadus; D. Arnaud; R. Brown; J. Caples	Dat Nigga Daz	5:08
4.	"21 Jumpstreet" (Snoop Doggy Dogg & Tray Deee)	C. Broadus; T. Davis	Dat Nigga Daz	5:26
5.	"One More Day" (Nate Dogg)	N. Hale	Dat Nigga Daz	5:18
6.	"Harvest for the World" (Jewell)	E. Isley; M. Isley; K. Isley; R. Isley; R. Isley; C. Jasper	Dr. Dre	3:52
7.	"Who Got Some Gangsta Shit?" (Snoop Doggy Dogg featuring Tha Dogg Pound, Lil' Style, and Young Swoop)	C. Broadus; D. Arnaud; R. Brown; R. Gillion	Soopafly	5:28
8.	"Come When I Call" (Danny Boy)	D. Blake	DJ Quik; George "G-One" Archie	4:55
9.	"U Better Recognize" (Sam Sneed featuring Dr. Dre)	Sam Sneed	Sam Sneed	3:54
10.	"Come Up to My Room" (Jodeci featuring Tha Dogg Pound)	D. Arnaud; R. Brown; C. Hailey; J. Hailey; D. DeGrate; D. DeGrate	Dat Nigga Daz; DeVante Swing (co.)	4:37
11.	"Woman to Woman" (Jewell)	J. Banks; C. Marion; K. Thigpen	DJ Quik; George "G-One" Archie; Jewell	5:18
12.	"Dollaz + Sense" (DJ Quik)	D. Blake; G. Archie	DJ Quik	5:53
13.	"The Eulogy" (Slip Capone & CPO)	V. Edwards; Christen Kelley	San Man	4:48
14.	"Horny" (B-Rezell)	M. McWilliams; T. Wrice	Kevin Lewis; Marc McWilliams	4:41
15.	"Eastside-Westside" (Young Soldierz)	W. Dillon; S. Doby	Big Wy; Lil' Stretch	4:45
Total length:				1:13:14

Cassette release exclusive
No.	Title	Writer(s)	Producer(s)	Length
16.	"Hot Ones" (O.F.T.B.)	Flipside; Low M. B.; Bus Stop	Brian G	4:46
Total length:				1:18:00

== Samples ==
"21 Jumpstreet"

- "Nobody Can Be You (But You)" by Steve Arrington

"Who Got Some Gangsta Shit?"

- "P.S.K. (What Does It Mean?)" by Schoolly D
- "6 in the Mornin'" by Ice-T

"Come When I Call"

- "Let Me Love You" by Michael Henderson

"Woman to Woman"

- "Woman to Woman" by Shirley Brown

"Dollaz & Sense"

- "I Like (What You're Doing to Me)" by Young & Company

'"Eastside-Westside"

- "Dazz" by Brick

== Personnel ==
- Executive Producer: Suge Knight
- Soundtrack director: Dr. Dre
- Overseer: Dat Nigga Daz
- Recorded at Can-Am Studios
- Mixed at Dr. Dre's Crib
- Death Row Engineers: Kesden Wright, Tommy D. Daugherty & Danny Alonso
- Photographers: Yoko Sato, Simone Green
- Background Vocals: Nanci Fletcher, Barbara Wilson, Danette Williams

== Cover versions ==
- Jeremy Messersmith with Andy Thompson performed a cover of "Murder Was the Case" at The Cake Shop in Minneapolis, MN for a 'Murder and Death' concept show on 1/10/2010.
- South Park Mexican's song "Woodson N' Worthin" is a cover of "Murder Was the Case".
- Don Vito and Mad DPS covered the song on the 2008 compilation album The Triple-Six Mixtape.

== Charts ==
=== Weekly charts ===
Chart (1994–1995)	Peak position
Canada Top Albums/CDs (RPM)	27
German Albums (Offizielle Top 100)	62
Swedish Albums (Sverigetopplistan)	26
UK Compilation Albums (Official Charts)	22
US Billboard 200	1
US Top R&B/Hip-Hop Albums (Billboard)	1

=== Year-end charts ===
Chart (1994)	Position
US Billboard 200	79
US Top R&B/Hip-Hop Albums (Billboard)	14

Chart (1995)	Position
US Billboard 200	58
US Top R&B/Hip-Hop Albums (Billboard)	14

== Certifications ==
Region	Certification	Certified units/sales
Canada (Music Canada)	Gold	50,000^{^}
United States (RIAA)	2× Platinum	2,000,000^{^}
^{^} Shipments figures based on certification alone.

== See also ==
- List of number-one albums of 1994 (U.S.)
- List of number-one R&B albums of 1994 (U.S.)
