= Stone City Band =

Backing band for Rick James

The Stone City Band
- Origin: United States
- Years active: 1978 - ? ? - present
- Labels: Gordy Records, Motown
- Members: Oscar Alston; Lanise Hughes; Nate Guido Hughes; Danny LeMelle; Tom McDermott; Levi Ruffin
- Past members: Oscar Alston; Lanise Hughes; David LeMelle; Tome McDermott; Levi Ruffin Jr; Erskine Williams

The Stone City Band was the backing band for Rick James. They played on his hits as well as backing him on live performances. They also had a number of hits of their own.

== Background ==
The group was put together by Rick James in the late 1970s. The hits that the group played on include, "You and I", "Super Freak", "Mary Jane", "Bustin’ Out", "Ghetto Life" and "Fire and Desire". The group's own hits include, "Strut Your Stuff", "Little Runaway", "Bad Lady" and "Ladies Choice".

== Career ==
The original Stone City Band was formed by Rick James and keyboardist Ed Roth around 1972. The other members included Danny Marks on guitar, Malcolm Tomlinson on drums and vocals, and Peter Hodgson on bass. Hodgson had been a member of Rhinoceros, a group that recorded for Elektra Records. From 23 May until 2 June, the band recorded a dozen tracks at a home studio belonging to Bruce Anthony. The tracks weren't released.

By the late 1970s, there was a new Stone City Band. The first recording credit for the group was on Rick James' 1978 album, Come Get It!.

In 1980, the group's album, Rick James Presents the Stone City Band, In 'n' Out was released. The musicians also included John Ervin on trombone and Cliff Ervin on trumpet. It included the tracks, "Little Runaway", "Strut Your Stuff", "Party Girls", "In 'N' Out", "Havin' You Around", "South American Sneeze", and "F.I.M.A. (Funk In Mama Afrika)". The group released the single, "Strut Your Stuff" on Gordy G 7179F. It was in the Singles to Watch section of Cash Box, 9 February issue. Referring to the music as polished funk, the reviewer also mentioned the bright chorus by the female singers and gruff male vocals complementing them. The reviewer also mentioned the horns, percussion and weaving bass, finishing off with referring to it as exceptional B/C fare. The single entered the Billboard Soul Singles chart on 3 August 1980. It peaked at no. 48 during its nine-week run.

In 1983 the group released the album Meet the Stone City Band! Out From the Shadows on Gordy 6042G. This was to be the album that was going show the band emerging from under Rick James' shadow. Unfortunately, James was having issues with Motown, which in turn affected the band as well as other acts in James' fold.

The group's single, "Bad Lady" bw "Bad Lady (Instrumental)" was released on Gordy 1681GF in May 1983. It debuted in the Black Singles chart on 2 July and peaked at no. 76 during its four-week run.

== 2020s ==
The members of the band in the 2020s are Oscar Alston, Lanise Hughes, Nate Guido Hughes, Danny Lemelle, Tom McDermott and Levi Ruffin.

== Members ==
=== Early 1970s line up (formed 1972) ===
- Peter Hodgson -bass
- Rick James - vocals
- Ed Roth - keyboards
- Danny Marks - guitar
- Malcolm Tomlinson - drums, vocals

=== Original line up (formed late 1970s) ===
- Oscar Alston - bass
- Lanise Hughes - drums
- David LeMelle - saxophone
- Tom McDermott - guitar
- Levi Ruffin Jr - keyboards
- Erskine Williams - keyboards
