= U Better Recognize =

Single by Sam Sneed featuring Dr. Dre

from the album Murder Was the Case
- B-side: "Come When I Call"
- Released: October 15, 1994
- Recorded: 1994
- Studio: Can-Am Studios (Tarzana, Los Angeles)
- Genre: West Coast hip-hop; hip-hop
- Length: 3:53
- Label: Death Row; Interscope
- Songwriter: Sam Sneed
- Producer: Sam Sneed

Dr. Dre singles chronology
"Let Me Ride" (1993)	"U Better Recognize" (1994)	"Natural Born Killaz" (1994)

Music video
- "U Better Recognize" on YouTube

"U Better Recognize" is Sam Sneed's first and only single while he was on Death Row Records. The B-side was "Come When I Call" by Danny Boy.

== Single information ==
"U Better Recognize" featuring Dr. Dre was released by Sam Sneed in 1994. He became known for the catchphrase, "I'm Sam Sneed, you better recognize!" (which he famously repeated on the intro to "Pump Pump", the eighteenth track from Snoop Dogg's debut album Doggystyle), from the song and the related Death Row film, Murder Was the Case. The single peaked at number 16 on the Billboard Hot Dance Music/Maxi-Singles Sales chart, 18 on the Hot Rap Tracks chart and 48 on the Hot R&B/Hip-Hop Singles & Tracks chart.

== Music video ==
The music video featured Dr. Dre and was directed by Hype Williams.

== Charts ==
Chart	Position
US Billboard Hot Dance Music/Maxi-Singles Sales	16
US Billboard Hot Rap Tracks	18
US Billboard Hot R&B Singles	48
