= Sam Sneed =

American record producer (born 1968)

- Born: Samuel D. Anderson; February 29, 1968 (age 58); McKeesport, Pennsylvania, U.S.
- Genre: Hip-hop
- Occupations: Record producer; rapper; songwriter
- Years active: 1991–present
- Labels: Death Row; Roc-A-Fella; Street Scholar (current)

Samuel D. Anderson (born February 29, 1968), known professionally as Sam Sneed, is an American record producer and rapper. He originally got his start working as a producer for K-Solo and the Hit Squad.

== Biography ==
=== Early years ===
In 1993, he was signed to Death Row Records, releasing only one single, "U Better Recognize" featuring Dr. Dre in 1994. The single appeared on the Murder Was the Case soundtrack and peaked at #16 on the Billboard Hot Dance Music/Maxi-Singles Sales chart, #18 on the Hot Rap Tracks chart and #48 on the Hot R&B/Hip-Hop Singles & Tracks chart. He became well known for his catchphrase, "My name is Sam Sneed; you better recognize!", which he famously repeated on the intro to "Pump Pump", the eighteenth track from Snoop Dogg's debut album, Doggystyle. He also appeared in the Death Row movie, Murder Was the Case.

Sam Sneed also co-produced the hit songs "Keep Their Heads Ringin'" and "Natural Born Killaz" with Dr. Dre. "Natural Born Killaz" was originally supposed to be a Sam Sneed and J-Flexx song called "The Heist"; this version, featuring a verse from Sam Sneed, was released on the Ultimate Death Row Collection on November 24, 2009. He recorded an album on Death Row Records with his group Street Scholars in 1996 which included J-Flexx, Dr. Dre, Mel-Man, Bud'da, Sharief (now known as Killer Ben) and Drauma (now known as Stocks McGuire); the album remains unreleased.

Sneed was diagnosed with a brain tumor in 1999, which put a temporary halt to his career, but has since recovered and is once again an active hip hop producer. He has since produced songs for the likes of G-Unit, Scarface, Jay-Z and many others. Sam went to work with Dr. Dre in 2007 again, but nothing manifested. He has since started a new company with his business partner Craig "Stretch" Mason, Nustarz Entertainment. The label features new artists managed by Sam such as The Boy Goldy, Money Ink and British rapper, producer and songwriter Nat Powers.

In 2010, Death Row/WIDEawake Entertainment announced the release date of January 25, 2011, for Sam Sneed's album Street Scholars which contained four unreleased songs from Sneed's time at Death Row along with 10 newly recorded tracks.

== Discography ==
- Street Scholars (2011)
