= W.A.W.G. (We All We Got) =

Studio album by Tha Dogg Pound
- Released: May 31, 2024
- Recorded: 2023–2024
- Genres: West Coast hip-hop; gangsta rap
- Length: 51:00
- Labels: Death Row; Gamma.
- Producers: Snoop Dogg (exec.); DJ Battlecat; DJ Premier; Jelly Rol; Mike & Keys; Rick Rock; Soopafly

Tha Dogg Pound chronology
DPG 4 Life (2021)	W.A.W.G. (We All We Got) (2024)

W.A.W.G. (We All We Got) is the ninth studio album by American hip-hop duo Tha Dogg Pound, composed of rappers Daz Dillinger and Kurupt. It was released on May 31, 2024, through Death Row Records in collaboration with Gamma. The album features guest appearances from Snoop Dogg, Tha Eastsidaz, Blxst, Stressmatic, Soulcat, Butch Cassidy, DaBaby, Jane Handcock, October London, The Lady of Rage, and RBX. Production on the album was handled by DJ Battlecat, DJ Premier, Mike & Keys, Rick Rock, and Soopafly, among others. It marks the duo's return to Death Row for the first time since their 1995 debut, Dogg Food.

== Background ==
After a period of renewed collaboration between Daz and Kurupt, Tha Dogg Pound began work on W.A.W.G. in late 2023. Snoop Dogg, who acquired Death Row Records in 2022, played a key role in facilitating their return to the label. The album was also promoted through Web3 initiatives and exclusive content via Gala Music.

The album marked Tha Dogg Pound's first project of newly recorded material on Death Row in nearly three decades.

The album features collaborations with Snoop Dogg, Tha Eastsidaz, Blxst, Butch Cassidy, DaBaby, will.i.am, October London, Jane Handcock, The Lady of Rage, and RBX. Production was handled by Mike & Keys, Rick Rock, DJ Battlecat, Jelly Roll, DJ Premier, and Soopafly.

== Release and reception ==
Professional ratings
Review scores
Source	Rating
Underground Hip Hop Blog	8/10
RapReviews	Positive

Critics generally received the album positively. RapReviews highlighted the project's adherence to West Coast hip-hop traditions, noting its "laid-back intro filled with Snoop’s ad-libs over a psychedelic jazz beat" and praising the production by Mike & Keys.

HotNewHipHop commended the album's nostalgic value, stating that tracks like "Smoke Up" and "Imma Dogg" deliver on the old-school West Coast style, transporting listeners back to the mid-1990s.

== Track listing ==
#	Title	Featured artists	Producer(s)	Length
1	"Intro"	Snoop Dogg	Mike & Keys; Moonbyrd (co.)	1:45
2	"Smoke Up"	Snoop Dogg	Rick Rock	2:31
3	"We All We Got"	Snoop Dogg, Tha Eastsidaz	Jelly Roll	4:55
4	"Imma Dogg"	—N/a	DJ Battlecat	2:44
5	"Need Some Space"	Blxst	Mike & Keys	2:34
6	"Favorite Color Blue"	Stressmatic, Soulcat	Rick Rock	3:00
7	"Inside of Her"	Butch Cassidy	Mike & Keys	2:55
8	"House Party"	Snoop Dogg	Mike & Keys	3:36
9	"After Hours"	Snoop Dogg, DaBaby, Butch Cassidy	Mike & Keys	3:54
10	"LA Kind of Love"	—N/a	Rick Rock	3:53
11	"Grown Up"	Snoop Dogg	Mike & Keys	2:40
12	"The Weekend"	Jane Handcock, October London	Soopafly	4:18
13	"Always on My Mind"	Snoop Dogg, Butch Cassidy	Mike & Keys	3:13
14	"Who Da Hardest?"	Snoop Dogg, The Lady of Rage, RBX	DJ Premier	5:24
Deluxe edition bonus track
15	"LA Kind of Love (Remix)"	will.i.am	Rick Rock; Johnny Goldstein	4:01

Total length: 51:00

== Personnel ==
- Snoop Dogg – executive producer, vocals, additional vocals, featuring artist
- Daz Dillinger – vocals
- Kurupt – vocals
- Tha Eastsidaz – vocals, featuring artist
- Blxst – vocals, featuring artist
- Butch Cassidy – vocals, featuring artist
- DaBaby – vocals, featuring artist
- will.i.am – vocals, featuring artist
- October London – vocals, featuring artist
- Jane Handcock – vocals, featuring artist, recording engineer
- The Lady of Rage – vocals, featuring artist
- RBX – vocals, featuring artist
- Stressmatic - featuring artist
- DJ Battlecat - producer, mixing engineer, vocals, talk box
- DJ Premier - producer, mixing engineer, scratches
- Jelly Roll - producer
- Mike & Keys - producer
- Rick Rock - producer
- Soopafly - producer, mixing engineer
- Johnny Goldstein - producer
- Moonbyrd - co-producer
- DJ K.i.D. - mixing engineer
- Justin Keitt - mixing engineer, recording engineer
- Richard Huredia - mixing engineer
- Christopher Gutierrez - recording engineer
- Frank Vasquez - engineer, recording engineer, assistant recording engineer
- Shon Lawon - engineer, recording engineer
- Christopher Anthems - assistant recording engineer
- Brian Gardner - mastering engineer
- J. Rey Soul - background vocals, vocals
- Soulcat - additional vocals
- Wyann Cat - additional vocals
- Death Row Records & Gamma - copyright ©, label
