= 100 Wayz =

Studio album by Tha Dogg Pound
- Released: August 17, 2010
- Recorded: 2007–2009
- Genre: West Coast hip hop; gangsta rap
- Length: 66:43
- Label: Felder
- Producer: Daz Dillinger (also exec.); Ivan Johnson; Soopafly; Troy Sanders

Tha Dogg Pound chronology
That Was Then, This Is Now (2010)	100 Wayz (2010)	DPG 4 Life (2021)

100 Wayz is the seventh studio album by rap group Tha Dogg Pound. It was originally scheduled to be released after their 2007 release, Dogg Chit. Their sixth album, That Was Then, This Is Now was released instead. 100 Wayz was released on August 17, 2010 but Amazon.com put it up for pre-order sale three weeks earlier on July 27, 2010.

== Background ==
After waiting almost two years to release 100 Wayz through Koch Records, Tha Dogg Pound left Koch and began working on That Was Then, This Is Now. Daz Dillinger criticized Alan Grunblatt in recent interviews and mixtapes, ruling out any future releases through Koch Records. However he also stated that 100 Wayz would still be coming out, but with new and unleaked material. The original singles and several tracks that were promoting the 100 Wayz album during 2008 and early 2009 were now included on That Was Then, This Is Now.

On 1 December 2009, Daz gave a preview of his new single for the 100 Wayz album, called "sky'z tha limit", which Soopafly & Daz on the productions. Daz announced there would be 16 brand new tracks on the 100 Wayz album, and it would be released in 2010 through major distribution, and executive produced by Snoop Dogg, as well as released through the Doggystyle Records imprint.

== Collaborations ==
Daz and Kurupt stated in a 2008 interview with DubCNN, that the album will feature Krayzie Bone on a song called Money Foldin, as well as Cassidy on a remix of the Daz song I'm From The Hood. They've also done a track with Pharrell called Cheat. These tracks were later moved to the album That Was Then, This Is Now.

== Track listing ==
No.	Title	Producer(s)	Length
1.	"D.P.G. 2010" (featuring RBX)	Daz Dillinger	1:23
2.	"All You"	Daz Dillinger; Soopafly	3:57
3.	"Dogg Pound Gangstaz"	Daz Dillinger; Ivan Johnson; Soopafly	3:14
4.	"Another Clip" (featuring Soopafly and RBX)	Daz Dillinger; Soopafly	4:30
5.	"Skyz tha Limit"	Soopafly	4:17
6.	"Gotta Let You Know" (featuring Nicole Wray and A-Dubb)	Daz Dillinger; Ivan Johnson; Soopafly	3:55
7.	"Good Pu$$y"	Daz Dillinger; Ivan Johnson; Soopafly	3:31
8.	"Cheat'n Ass Lover" (featuring Soopafly, Nate Dogg and Dru Down)	Daz Dillinger; Soopafly	4:28
9.	"Smell'n Like Brand New Money" (featuring Macshawn 100)	Troy Sanders	4:0
10.	"I Fear's No One"	Daz Dillinger; Soopafly	4:31
11.	"I Don't Care" (featuring The Lady of Rage)	Daz Dillinger; Soopafly	3:35
12.	"Do U Drank"	Daz Dillinger; Soopafly	4:28
13.	"Fly Azz Fucc" (featuring Snoop Dogg and The Lady of Rage)	Daz Dillinger; Soopafly	4:3
14.	"Crazy n tha Club"	Daz Dillinger; Soopafly	3:30
15.	"Spread the Luv" (featuring Butch Cassidy, Celly Cel and LaToiya Williams)	Daz Dillinger; Ivan Johnson	5:19
16.	"Otha'side of Town" (featuring Soopafly and Tokedasmoke)	Daz Dillinger; Ivan Johnson; Soopafly	4:37
17.	"100 Wayz"	Daz Dillinger; Ivan Johnson	3:55
Total length:			1:06:43

== Charts ==
Chart (2010)	Peak position
US Top R&B/Hip-Hop Albums (Billboard)	83
