= 19th Street LBC Compilation =

C-Style Presents 19th Street LBC Compilation

Compilation album by various artists
- Released: March 10, 1998
- Recorded: 1995–1998
- Studio: Sound Castle (Silver Lake, Los Angeles); Can-Am (Tarzana, Los Angeles)
- Genre: West Coast hip hop; gangsta rap; g-funk
- Length: 70:52
- Label: Virgin; Noo Trybe
- Producer: Eric L. Brooks (exec.); Big C-Style (exec.); Daz Dillinger; L.T. Hutton; Soopafly; DJ Aladdin; Beau Dozier; Dave "Swang" Knight; Salim H. Grant

Singles from 19th Street LBC Compilation
- 1. "Bustaz" Released: 1997

19th Street LBC Compilation is a compilation presented by Big C-Style, introducing Long Beach based rappers, and mostly featuring Tha Dogg Pound and LBC Crew affiliates.

== Track listing ==
No.	Title	Producer(s)	Length
1.	"Intro"	*Interlude*	0:50
2.	"Bustaz"	Lil' C-Style, RBX, Daz Dillinger, Tray Deee, The Legacy	3:33
3.	"Stay Out of L.A."	CoCo Loc, Crooked I, Sho Shot, Lil' Tip Toe, Shorty K	5:16
4.	"Paper Chase"	Tray Deee, Beau Dozier, CoCo Loc, Lil' C-Style	5:12
5.	"Interlude I"	*Interlude*	0:32
6.	"Success Before I Die"	CoCo Loc, The Legacy, Crooked I, Lil Tip Toe	5:08
7.	"Rap Killer"	Techniec, Lil' J, J-Money, Crooked I, Tray Deee, Lil' Tip Toe, Shorty K	5:16
8.	"Interlude II"	*Interlude*	0:45
9.	"Jackin for Flows"	McGruff, CoCo Loc, Lil' Tip Toe, Sho Shot, Crooked I, Diceman, Lil' J, J-Money	5:00
10.	"Watchin' You, Watchin' Me"	The Legacy, Lil' J, Sho Shot, Shorty K	4:15
11.	"Gangsta Gangsta"	Tray Deee, J-Money, Crooked I, Sho Shot, The Legacy	5:00
12.	"Interlude III"	*Interlude*	1:00
13.	"Flossin'"	Bad Azz, Tray Deee, Lil' C-Style	4:13
14.	"Servin' & Swervin'"	The Legacy, Crooked I, Lil' J, Sho Shot, Shorty K	4:58
15.	"Bounce to This"	Bo-Roc, Crooked I, Amber Davis, J-Money, Sho Shot	3:59
16.	"I Like to Roll"	Bad Azz, CoCo Loc, Lil' J, Shorty K	4:58
17.	"Ashes to Ashes"	Crooked I, Lil' J, Lil' Tip Toe, Shorty K	4:48
18.	"One Ninein'"	The Legacy, McGruff, CoCo Loc, Techniec, Crooked I, Lil' J, J-Money, Sho Shot, Diceman, Lil' Tip Toe, Shorty K	6:09

== Critical reception ==
The compilation received moderate reviews. AllMusic's Leo Stanley gave it 3/5 stars and says that "it's a good concept, and for the most part, it works well, even if some of the tracks are a little flat musically."
