= Tha Dogg Pound =

American hip hop duo

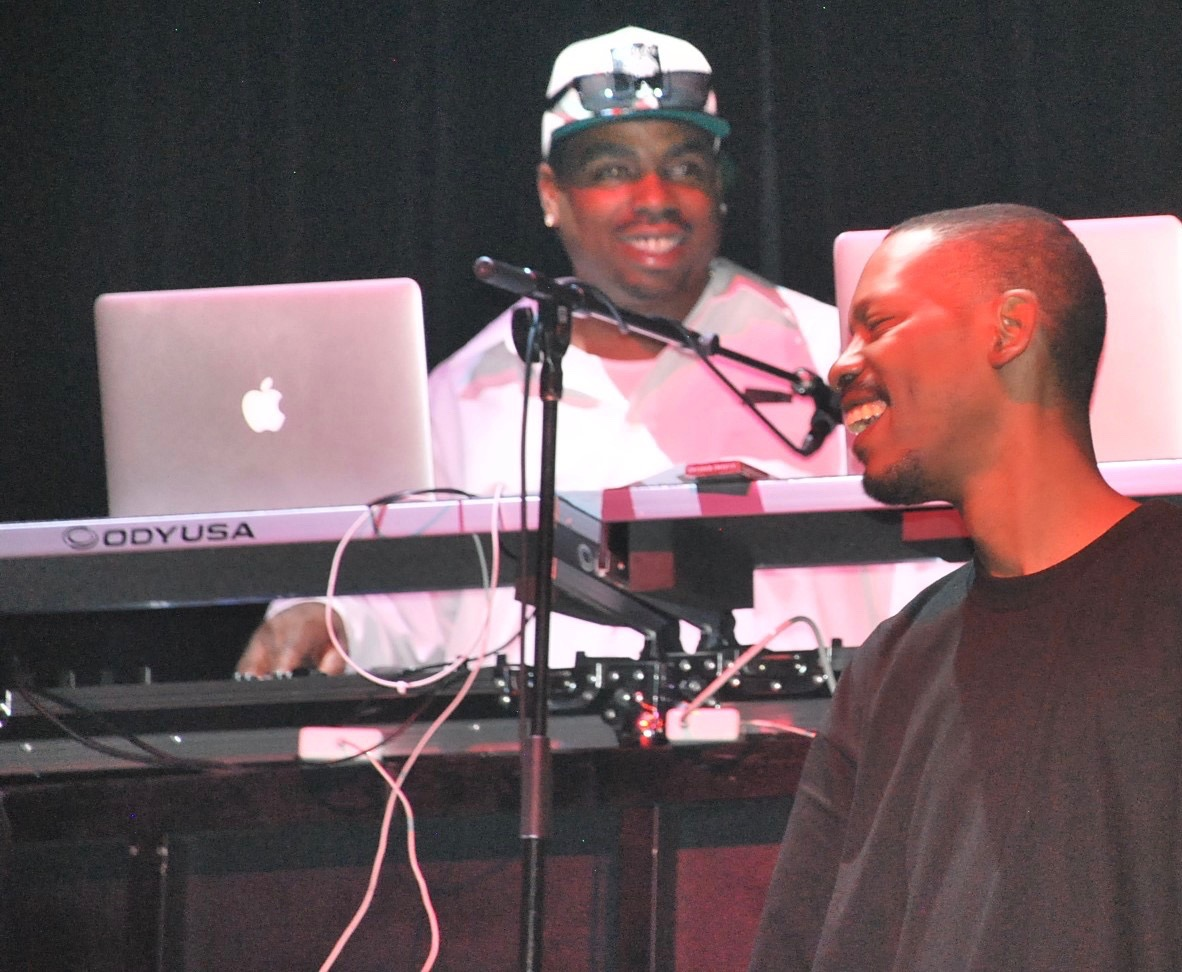
- Tha Dogg Pound in 2015

Background information
- Also known as: DPG (Dogg Pound Gangstaz); Dillinger & Young Gotti
- Origin: Long Beach, California U.S.
- Genres: West Coast hip-hop; gangsta rap; G-funk
- Years active: 1992–2002; 2005–present
- Labels: Death Row; Interscope; Doggy Style; Gangsta Advisory
- Members: Kurupt; Daz Dillinger

Tha Dogg Pound is an American hip-hop duo composed of West Coast rappers Kurupt and Daz Dillinger. They were among the first acts to sign to Death Row Records in 1992.

Kurupt and Daz Dillinger went on to release solo albums starting in 1998; they left the crumbling Death Row Records the following year. Daz left due to long-lasting internal struggles on the label after friend and labelmate Tupac Shakur's murder in 1996. Kurupt started Antra Records, while Daz and Soopafly started D.P.G. Recordz. In 2002, a feud arose between the two when Kurupt decided to sign back with Death Row Records, upsetting everyone involved with the group. His awaited Death Row release Against the Grain had been postponed several times while Kurupt was on the label, later being released in August 2005, after he was off. In January 2005, Daz made another solo album release titled Tha Dogg Pound Gangsta LP. Tha Dogg Pound then got back together as a group and released Dillinger & Young Gotti II in November 2005. In 2006, Snoop Dogg executive produced released their official reunion album Cali Iz Active.

== History ==
=== Death Row years (1992–1997) ===
Before The Chronic album came out, Kurupt and Daz were solo artists. Having heard the chemistry they had while recording the album, Dr. Dre suggested they form a group. The two went on to feature on Doggystyle and various features and soundtracks as Tha Dogg Pound.

Between 1993 and 1994, the group assisted Hammer on his The Funky Headhunter album (such as the song "Sleepin' on a Master Plan" and others), along with Suge Knight and the Whole 9.

In 1995, they released their debut album Dogg Food under Death Row Records. The album debuted at number one on the Billboard 200 and went on to reach twice platinum status. "Let's Play House" was the biggest hit, breaking into the Top 50 of the Billboard Hot 100, while "New York, New York" was an MTV favorite; in the video for the latter, Kurupt, Daz and Snoop stomped Godzilla-like around the Big Apple, taunting their East Coast rivals. In the October that followed, towards the end of the same year, Tupac Shakur had been bailed out of jail by Death Row's Suge Knight in exchange for releasing his following four albums on Death Row Records.

In 1996, Tha Dogg Pound were featured on 2Pac's Death Row Records debut album All Eyez on Me with Kurupt featured in "Got My Mind Made Up" and "Check Out Time" and Daz Dillinger producing the hit songs "2 of Amerikaz Most Wanted", "Ambitionz az a Ridah", and "I Ain't Mad At Cha". They made an appearance on Snoop Doggy Dogg's album Tha Doggfather.

=== Kurupt and Daz leave Death Row (1998–2001) ===
In January 1998, Kurupt left Death Row but remained in Tha Dogg Pound. Kurupt released two solo albums in 1998 (Kuruption!) and 1999 (Tha Streetz Iz a Mutha) that had Daz Dillinger and the rest of DPG on them. However, in 1998, Daz was making noise of his own over at Death Row and released his only Death Row album (Retaliation, Revenge and Get Back). Afterward, he made his own label called Mobstyle Muzik, in which he had his first taste of the independent scene. Mobstyle's first release Poppa Snoop Presents Mobstyle Muzik Volume 1 failed and Daz returned to Death Row. He later started up DPG Recordz along with Christopher "Big C-Style" Bowden through Death Row Records.

Daz also eventually parted ways with Death Row in December 1998 and released his first independent album R.A.W. in 2000. That was followed by the D.P.G. album from Tha Dogg Pound entitled Dillinger & Young Gotti. After Tha Dogg Pound's full departure from Death Row, Suge Knight claimed ownership of the name "Tha Dogg Pound" and any tracks recorded prior to them leaving. To avoid a legal battle at the time, Daz changed their marketing name to D.P.G. short for Dogg Pound Gangstaz. In 2001, Suge Knight released a Dogg Pound album entitled 2002, which consisted of unreleased Dogg Pound tracks. Soopafly's songs were featured on his 2001 solo album Dat Whoopty Woop.

=== External matters (2002–2004) ===
Over the years, Tha Dogg Pound had beef with Bone Thugs-N-Harmony, due to Death Row Records being embroiled in a feud with Eazy-E's Ruthless Records. Tha Dogg Pound made a diss towards The Bone Thugs, on the song "Dogg Pound Gangstaz", with Kurupt's line "Ain't got no love for no hoes in harmony." In response Layzie Bone shot back on the track "Shotz to tha Double Glock" with the line "Dogg Pound hoes it's on.", and Krayzie Bone with "Gotta find these 'Row Hoes" in the song "Mo' Murda" off the album E. 1999 Eternal. The feud ended when Snoop Dogg and Kurupt were featured on Krayzie Bone's album Thug Mentality 1999 in the song "The War Iz On." Kurupt was featured on Flesh-N-Bone's song "Kurupted Flesh" on the 5th Dog Let Loose. Krayzie Bone also featured on Daz Dillinger's 2008 solo album Only on the Left Side on the song "Meal Ticket" and later on the song "Money Fold'N" on Tha Dogg Pound's 2009 album That Was Then, This Is Now.

Tha Dogg Pound were also involved in a feud with B.G. Knocc Out & Dresta. In response to Eazy-E's Real Muthaphukkin G's and Kokane & Cold 187um's "Don't Bite The Funk", Tha Dogg Pound along with Snoop Dogg made a track called "What Would You Do" with such lines as: "Fuck B.G. Knocc Out and every nigga down with him." Later B.G. Knocc Out & Dresta retaliated with the song "D.P.G. Killa", on their debut album Real Brothas. They have since squashed the beef and released a song called "Blaze It Up", as a bonus track on Tha Dogg Pound's Dogg Chit album.

The duo engaged in yet another conflict, the beef Suge and new signee 2Pac initiated against Bad Boy Entertainment's Puff Daddy and Notorious B.I.G.; Daz and Kurupt would expand the feud to include Capone-N-Noreaga, Tragedy Khadafi and Mobb Deep with their Snoop-assisted single "New York, New York."

In late 2002, Kurupt shocked the entire DPGC (Dogg Pound Gangsta Clicc) and fans alike, when he accepted the job of executive producer at Death Row Records. Daz, Soopafly, Snoop Dogg, and the rest of DPGC viewed this as betrayal and criticised Kurupt harshly for making the move. Kurupt did the same in return, claiming they all were wrong to have turned their backs on Death Row and that they had changed, not him.

The rap duo heavily dissed each other from 2003 to late 2004, both recording diss albums against each other. Daz took aim at Kurupt and Death Row with his single "U Ain't Shit" featuring Bad Azz and another song "I Don't Give a Fucc" which is sung over the beat to 50 Cent's In da Club. Kurupt responded heavily with his Originals album which featured many disses throughout nearly every song, most notably the bonus track "Eat a Dicc (Fucc Daz)".

=== Reunion (2005–2023) ===
The feud continued until April 2005 when Kurupt and Daz made a truce. The struggling Death Row Records failed to promote Kurupt's album Against Tha Grain and the duo began to feel remorse for one another. Kurupt left Death Row and reunited with Daz. The duo started rapping together again and even made a new album together entitled Dillinger & Young Gotti II: Tha Saga Continuez. After The Western Conference in 2005 the two of them agreed to revitalize the DPGC by working together once again on an album with Snoop Dogg, Soopafly, Nate Dogg, Warren G, RBX, Lady of Rage and Lil' ½ Dead with Snoop taking over the producing and distributing tasks for it.

Tha Dogg Pound then released a joint venture reunion comeback project the next year in 2006 called Cali Iz Active under the aegis of Snoop Dogg's Doggystyle Records with the main single "Cali Iz Active" featuring Snoop Dogg and a wide range of new producers throughout the album.

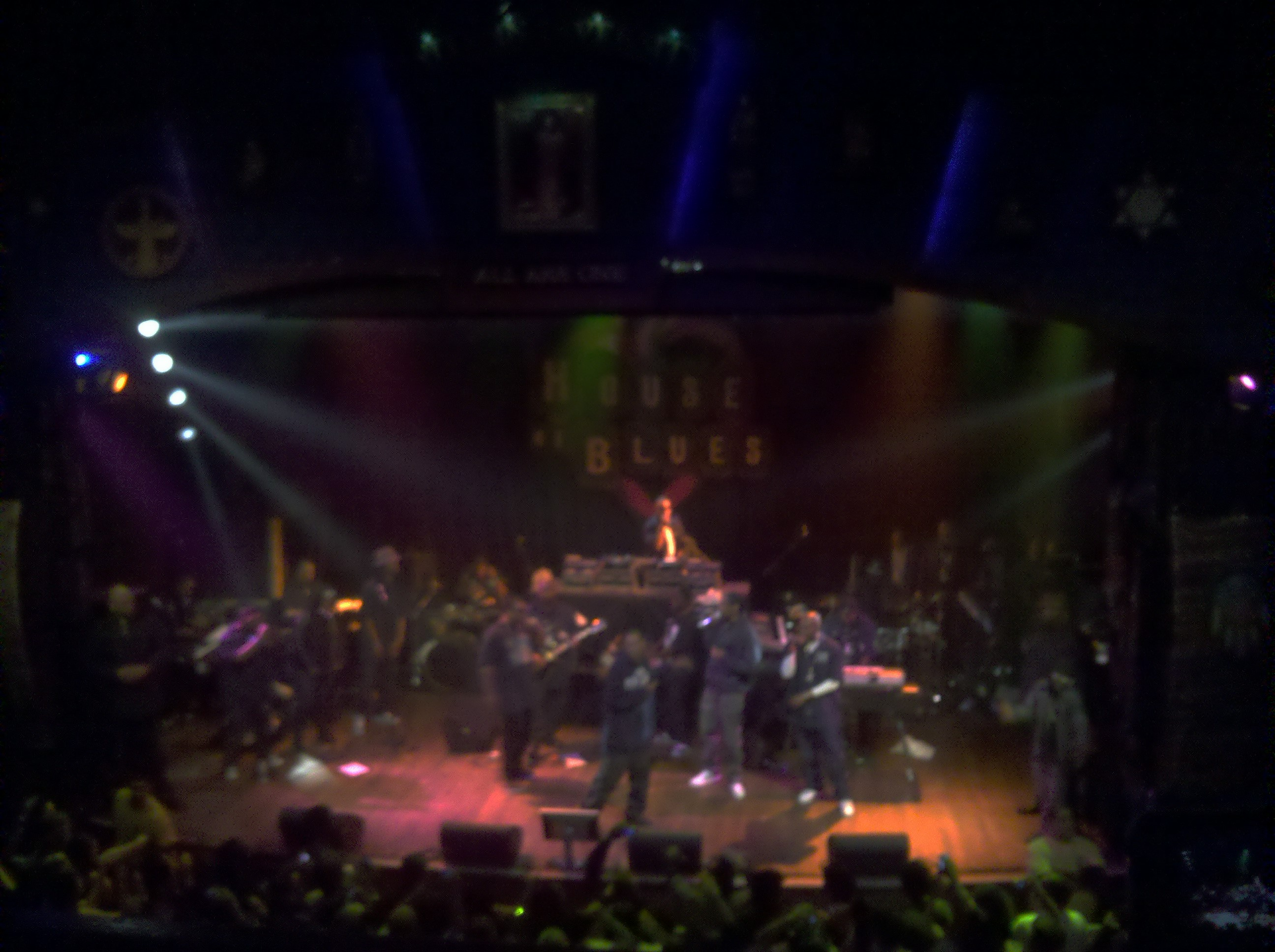
Tha Dogg Pound performing with Snoop Dogg, 2011

Tha Dogg Pound released the album Dogg Chit independently on March 27, 2007, touting it as a sequel to their debut. In August 2007 it was announced that the duo was in the process of signing to Cash Money Records; their next album was announced as Westcoast Aftershocc. The pair released the singles "Ch-Ching" and "Mystic River" from the album, but when the deal stalled, they postponed the project in favor of a separate album, 100 Wayz. Tha Dogg Pound began putting out singles for the latter album as early as 2008, releasing "Cheat" featuring Pharrell and following up with "They Don't Want It" featuring Soopafly, and "Get My Drink on & My Smoke On." Although 100 Wayz was expected for release that year, it was postponed due to a dispute with Koch Records head Alan Grunblatt; instead, they released the album That Was Then, This is Now, which included the singles originally intended for 100 Wayz, in late 2009.

After putting out the compilation album Keep on Ridin in May 2010, 100 Wayz finally saw release in July of that year. Since then, the duo announced several projects, including Dillinger & Young Gotti III: Get Paid, a collaboration album with Pete Rock, and a re-announcement of the album Westcoast Aftershocc for 2011, as well as several solo projects from Kurupt working with various producers, from DJ Premier and Pete Rock to Fredwreck. However, their only releases of late have been Kurupt's solo album Street Lights and two projects from Daz Dillinger.

Recently, tha Dogg Pound has been involved in various side projects; Kurupt announced the formation of supergroup 1st Generation, made up of himself, King Tee, Sir Jinx, Gangsta of tha Comradz and MC Eiht and producer Tha Chill of Compton's Most Wanted. Both Kurupt and Daz have formed a supergroup called the N'Matez consisting of themselves, the Lady of Rage, and RBX. In December 2011, Tha Dogg Pound put out the single "Forever in a Day," featuring Snoop Dogg, although they have not announced whether it is attached to a specific project. A few days later, the duo announced that their next group album will be entitled Alumni and is set to be executive produced by Snoop Dogg and Dr. Dre, who will be co-producing and/or mixing several of the beats. The album will mark the first time a member of Tha Dogg Pound has collaborated with Dr. Dre since Kurupt's appearances on the producer's album 2001, and the first time Dre has collaborated with Tha Dogg Pound as a duo since he mixed their debut album, Dogg Food. On December 2, 2012, Tha Dogg Pound released a collaboration mixtape with Snoop Dogg titled That's My Work Vol. 1.

In 2021, Tha Dogg Pound were prepping to release their Dogg Food II album with the lead single "Let's Roll" debuted in late 2020. Their follow-up single "Nice & Slow" was released in July 2021 and featured Snoop Dogg. In 2023, Daz Dillinger shared on social media that the album would be released soon on Dogg Pound Records. As of April 2024, the album is yet to be released.

=== Back on Death Row (2024–) ===
In April 2024, a new song, titled "Smoke Up", was released featuring Snoop Dogg. The end of the song's music video promoted a new album, titled W.A.W.G. (We All We Got), that would be released on Death Row Records in June 2024. On May 31, 2024, the album was released ahead of schedule on all major streaming platforms.

== D.P.G. ==
An extended family referred to as DPG (short for Dogg Pound Gangstaz), is composed of Tha Dogg Pound, Snoop Dogg, and various affiliated acts from Death Row Records, G-Funk Records, DPG Recordz, Antra Music Group, Aftermath, and Dogg House Records eras, including Dr. Dre, Nate Dogg, Warren G, Soopafly, Lil C-Style, Bad Azz, Tray Deee, Goldie Loc, RBX, Lil ½ Dead, Twinz, Roscoe, E-White, Butch Cassidy, Techniec, Xzibit, Crooked I, Big Pimpin, Fredwreck, The Dove Shack, Baby S, Shawn Abrams, Pork Chop, Mr. Malik, Sam Sneed, Joe Cool, Ricky Harris, B-Tip, The D.O.C., Six Too, Hittman, Bow Wow, Mista Grimm, and Big C-Style. The group released their first unofficial album, DPGC: The Remix, in 2002.

== Discography ==
Studio albums

- Dogg Food (1995)
- Dillinger & Young Gotti (2001)
- Dillinger & Young Gotti II: Tha Saga Continuez... (2005)
- Cali Iz Active (2006)
- Dogg Chit (2007)
- That Was Then, This Is Now (2009)
- 100 Wayz (2010)
- DPG 4 Life (2021)
- W.A.W.G. (We All We Got) (2024)

== Awards and nominations ==
Grammy Award nominations

Tha Dogg Pound has been nominated for one Grammy Award.

Category	Genre	Song	Year	Result
Grammy Award for Best Rap Performance by a Duo or Group	Rap	"What Would You Do?"	1996	Nominated
