= The RBX Files =

Studio album by RBX
- Released: September 26, 1995
- Genre: West Coast hip hop; gangsta rap; G-funk
- Length: 68:17
- Label: Premeditated/Warner Bros. Records; 45866
- Producer: Greg "Gregski" Royal

RBX chronology
The RBX Files (1995)	No Mercy, No Remorse (1999)

Singles from The RBX Files
- 1. "A.W.O.L." / "Rough Is the Texture" Released: July 30, 1995

The RBX Files is the debut album by American rapper RBX, released September 26, 1995, on Premeditated/Warner Bros. Records. It peaked at number 12 on the Billboard Top R&B/Hip-Hop Albums and at number 62 on the Billboard 200. The album was produced by Greg "Gregski" Royal.

Along with singles, music videos were released for two songs: "A.W.O.L." and "Rough Is the Texture."

== Background ==
Following his guest appearances on The Chronic and Doggystyle, RBX was tagged to be Death Row’s next big star, but Dr. Dre and Suge Knight pushed back his debut, and he wound up leaving the label and putting out the album on Premeditated Records.

== Reception ==
Professional ratings
Review scores
Source	Rating
AllMusic	3/5 stars
The Source	3.5/5 stars

Alex Henderson of AllMusic called it an "interesting, if uneven, debut", noting the "distinctive rapping style". Option called it "subtly funky" with "expertly paced backing tracks". Wesley K. Marshall of The Source magazine called RBX's style unorthodox, while praising the artist himself as "an unquestionably skillful lyricist". The critic described the instrumentals used on the album as "eerie, clashing rugged beats".

== Track listing ==
No.	Title	Length
1.	"Introduction"	0:40
2.	"Brother Minister A. Samad Muhammad" (featuring. Brother Minister A. Samad Muhammad)	0:30
3.	"A.W.O.L."	3:53
4.	"Slip Into Long Beach"	3:10
5.	"The Edge"	4:31
6.	"Rough is the Texture"	4:32
7.	"Burn" (featuring E.D. Ameng)	7:04
8.	"Our Time is Now"	3:34
9.	"Feathers in the Wind"	4:15
10.	"Rec Dialec Introduction (Interlude)"	0:28
11.	"Tundra" (featuring D. Cipher, E.D. Ameng, and Meticulous Mad 1)	4:47
12.	"Drama (Interlude)"	0:49
13.	"Mom's are Cryin'"	4:00
14.	"BMS on the Attack"	1:21
15.	"Sounds of Reality"	4:14
16.	"Armageddon (Interlude)" (featuring Brother Minister A. Samad Muhammad)	2:23
17.	"Akebulan" (featuring Ganjah K)	6:15
18.	"Fightin’ the Devil"	1:51
19.	"No Time"	4:25
20.	"Our Time Is Now (Outro)"	0:28
21.	"A.W.O.L. (Gregski Remix)"	4:56

== Charts ==
=== Weekly charts ===
Chart (1995)	Peak position
US Billboard 200	62
US Top R&B/Hip-Hop Albums (Billboard)	12
