= X Clan =

American hip hop group

- Origin: Brooklyn, New York City
- Genres: Hip hop
- Years active: 1989–1995; 2006–present
- Labels: 4th & B'way/Island; Polydor; Suburban Noize Records
- Members: Brother J Master China; Kumu; Ultraman; ACL; Lord Cza; DJ Fat Jack; Zulu
- Past members: Professor X (deceased); Sugar Shaft (deceased); Paradise the Architect

X Clan (formerly stylized as XCLAN and often incorrectly spelled X-Clan) is an American hip hop group from Brooklyn, New York, originally consisting of Brother J, Professor X, Paradise and Sugar Shaft. The current incarnation of the group features Brother J, Master China, Kumu, "Ultraman" Ra Hanna, ACL, Lord Cza, DJ Fat Jack and Zulu.

== Biography ==
Known for its Afrocentrism and militant activism as member of the Blackwatch movement, X Clan soon gained fame for the controversy its music aroused, though commercial success was sporadic. X Clan's debut was To the East, Blackwards (1990), followed by Xodus (1992) and a temporary break-up. Both albums peaked at No. 11 on Billboard's Top R&B/Hip-Hop Albums chart in the United States.

Other artists who were affiliated with X Clan and Blackwatch include Isis, Queen Mother Rage, and YZ. X Clan's affiliates released a string of titles throughout the early 1990s: Professor X released a solo album titled Years of the 9, on the Blackhand Side in 1991 and a second solo album titled Puss N' Boots: The Struggle Continues in 1993; Queen Mother Rage released Vanglorious Law in 1991 (vanglorious is a word that the group made up—not to be confused with "vainglorious"); Isis released Rebel Soul in 1990; and YZ released his debut Sons of The Father (noted for the song "Thinking of a Master Plan"), in 1989, followed by The Ghetto's Been Good to Me (which included his modest hit "Return of the Holy One") in 1993. YZ became affiliated with the group after releasing his first album, and that Isis is also the MC known as Linque Ayoung, who at one point was a member of the Wu-Tang Clan-affiliated group Deadly Venoms.

=== Later projects ===
In 1994 Brother J formed a new group, Dark Sun Riders, that released the full-length Seeds of Evolution in 1996. In 1995, long-time group member Sugar Shaft died from complications of AIDS. Brother J was an early and valued member of the worldwide Hip Hop organization called Ill Crew Universal. X Clan reunited in the late 1990s but did not release any new material. Brother J assembled a new crew that he calls X Clan Millennium Cipher and released a vinyl single for "The One/Blackwards Row" in 2004. Professor X died from complications of spinal meningitis on 17 March 2006.

A new X Clan album, titled Return from Mecca (originally titled The Trinity), was released in 2007, featuring Damian "Jr Gong" Marley, Chali 2na of Jurassic 5, RBX, KRS-One, Daddy X of Kottonmouth Kings, and Jacoby Shaddix, lead vocalist of the rock band Papa Roach. Also, Tech N9ne is featured on a hidden bonus track titled "Respect."

X Clan opened for Insane Clown Posse's Tempest Tour and, in January 2009, released an album titled Mainstream Outlawz.

== Discography ==
Album information
To the East, Blackwards
- Released: 15 May 1990
- Billboard 200 chart position: No. 97
- R&B/Hip-Hop chart position: No. 11
- Singles: "Raise the Flag"/"Heed the Word of the Brother", "Funkin' Lesson"/"Shaft's Big Score", "Grand Verbalizer, What Time is It?"
Xodus
- Released: 19 May 1992
- Billboard 200 chart position: No. 31
- R&B/Hip-Hop chart position: No. 11
- Singles: "Fire & Earth (100% Natural)", "Xodus"/"Foreplay", "A.D.A.M."/"F.T.P."
Return from Mecca
- Released: 30 January 2007
- Billboard 200 chart position:
- R&B/Hip-Hop chart position:
- Singles: "Weapon X"
Mainstream Outlawz
- Released: 27 January 2009
- Billboard 200 chart position:
- R&B/Hip-Hop chart position:
- Singles:
