= DPG 4 Life =

Studio album by Tha Dogg Pound
- Released: August 20, 2021
- Recorded: 2021
- Genres: West Coast hip-hop; gangsta rap
- Length: 51:33
- Labels: Dogg Food Records; RIVAL
- Producers: Daz Dillinger (also exec.); Brody Brown; Carlos "Los" McSwain; DJ 2High; DJ Money; Fredwreck; Kurupt; Mono/Poly

Tha Dogg Pound chronology
That Was Then, This Is Now (2009)	DPG 4 Life (2021)	W.A.W.G. (We All We Got) (2024)

DPG 4 Life is the eighth studio album by American hip-hop duo Tha Dogg Pound. It was released on August 20, 2021, through Dogg Food Records. The album features guest appearances from Mello Rymes, Kaydence, October London, Eric Bellinger, Tenah Nassar, Snoop Dogg, Shon Lawon, Kokane, LaToiya Williams, Soopafly, Carlos McSwain, and Wynn Vaughn. Production on the album was handled by Brody Brown, Daz Dillinger, Fredwreck, Kurupt, and Mono/Poly, among others.

== Background ==
Following a decade-long hiatus, Tha Dogg Pound—composed of Daz Dillinger and Kurupt—returned with DPG 4 Life, reaffirming their presence in West Coast hip-hop. Known for their signature G-funk sound and deep ties to the Death Row Records era, the duo crafted this album as both a continuation of their legacy and an adaptation to modern production styles.

The album blends nostalgic and contemporary elements, incorporating funk-driven beats with introspective storytelling. Tracks like "Ghetto" and "We Rollin’" showcase their classic style, while songs such as "Dissolution of Marriage" introduce a more reflective tone. Guest appearances from Snoop Dogg, Eric Bellinger, Kokane, and October London add depth to the project, reinforcing its connection to West Coast hip-hop traditions.

Critics praised DPG 4 Life for capturing the essence of Tha Dogg Pound's earlier work while maintaining relevance in today's hip-hop landscape. While some listeners felt the album leaned heavily on nostalgia, others appreciated its dedication to preserving the G-funk sound that defined an era.

== Release and reception ==
DPG 4 Life received widespread praise from hip-hop critics, particularly those with a deep appreciation for West Coast rap traditions. Many celebrated Tha Dogg Pound's ability to maintain their signature G-funk sound while delivering a fresh, engaging listening experience.

Critics highlighted the album's nostalgic appeal, noting that Daz Dillinger and Kurupt “sound like they never left the '90s,” skillfully recreating the classic G-funk formula while adapting it to a modern audience. The chemistry between the duo, combined with Daz Dillinger's production, was consistently cited as a standout aspect of the project.

The feature list also garnered attention, with reviewers praising its tribute to the golden era of West Coast hip-hop. While listeners commended the album's authenticity and consistency, some felt it did not significantly expand beyond Tha Dogg Pound's established sound. Despite this, the project was largely seen as a welcome return, reaffirming the duo's status as pioneers of the genre.

== Track listing ==
#	Title	Featured artists	Producer(s)	Length
1	"Ghetto"	Mello Rymes	DJ Money	5:16
2	"We Rollin"	Kaydence	Brody Brown; Carlos "Los" McSwain	4:03
3	"Dissolution of Marriage"	October London	Brody Brown; Carlos "Los" McSwain	3:35
4	"Used 2"	Eric Bellinger	Daz Dillinger	4:50
5	"Bottom Bitch"	Tenah Nassar	Fredwreck	2:59
6	"Nice & Slow"	Snoop Dogg; Shon Lawon	Daz Dillinger	3:29
7	"Skip Skip"	Kokane; Snoop Dogg	Mono/Poly	4:42
8	"Baby I Want U Bac"	LaToiya Williams	Daz Dillinger	3:31
9	"It Ain't Nuthin"	—N/a	Daz Dillinger	3:24
10	"I'm On It"	Soopafly	Daz Dillinger	4:36
11	"Let's Roll"	—N/a	Kurupt; Daz Dillinger; DJ 2High	3:47
12	"Hood Girl"	Carlos McSwain	Carlos "Los" McSwain	3:14
13	"L.A.'s Here To U"	Wynn Vaughn	Daz Dillinger	4:01

Total length: 51:33

== Personnel ==
Tha Dogg Pound

- Daz Dillinger – vocals, producer, executive producer
- Kurupt – vocals, producer

Featured artists

- Mello Rymes – vocals (track 1)
- Kaydence – vocals (track 2)
- October London – vocals (track 3)
- Eric Bellinger – vocals (track 4)
- Tenah Nassar – vocals (track 5)
- Shon Lawon – vocals (track 6)
- Snoop Dogg – vocals (tracks 6, 7)
- Kokane – vocals (track 7)
- LaToiya Williams – vocals (track 8)
- Soopafly – vocals (track 10)
- Carlos McSwain – vocals (track 12)
- Wynn Vaughn – vocals (track 13)
