= RBX =

- Born: Eric Dwayne Collins; October 8, 1967 (age 59); Long Beach, California, U.S.
- Other name: The Narrator
- Education: University of Nevada, Las Vegas
- Occupations: Rapper; songwriter; producer
- Years active: 1992–present
- Relatives: Snoop Dogg (cousin)
- Musical career
- Genres: Hip-hop; hardcore hip-hop
- Instrument: Vocals
- Labels: Premeditated Entertainment; Labcabin Records; Warner Bros.; Aftermath; Interscope; MCA; Doggystyle

Eric Dwayne Collins (born October 8, 1967), better known by his stage name RBX (standing for "Reality Born Unknown"), is an American rapper from Long Beach, California.

== Early life and education ==
Collins was born and raised in Long Beach, California. After graduating Long Beach Polytechnical High School in 1985, he received a scholarship to play college football for UNLV, alongside future Death Row Records CEO Suge Knight. His football career was cut short after sustaining a torn ACL, which helped push him to pursue a career in music. Contrary to popular belief, Collins is not related to funk legend Bootsy Collins, although the two are close friends.

== Career ==
=== 1992–1995: Death Row Records ===
RBX joined Death Row Records in 1992 with his cousins Snoop Dogg and Daz Dillinger. A former college student and retail manager, Collins declined to sign blank contracts like his Death Row brethren. His tenure on the label would be brief but memorable. Having made commanding cameos on The Chronic in 1992 and Doggystyle in 1993, RBX left the label in 1994 and signed with the lesser known Premeditated Entertainment. He released The RBX Files in 1995, his debut solo album that was produced by former Chronic production team member Greg "Gregski" Royal.

The album abandoned the popular West Coast G-Funk style in favor of a "gritty, dungeon-like" sound more associated with New York. The single "A.W.O.L." was an attack on Death Row, Suge Knight, Dre, and others, with X comparing the dubious business practices there to the days of Ruthless Records, Jerry Heller, and Eazy-E. In a YouTube interview with VladTV he talked about an altercation over food between him and Suge Knight, in which Knight pulled out a gun.

=== 1996–2000: Aftermath Entertainment ===
In 1996, RBX visited Dr. Dre at home and apologized for his harsh words on record and in magazines and immediately signed to Dre's new Aftermath label. He was featured on the 1996 compilation Dr. Dre Presents... The Aftermath on the solo song "Blunt Time" and the group track "East Coast/West Coast Killaz" with KRS-One, B-Real and Nas, with both songs produced by Dre. Lost in the infamous reshuffling of Aftermath in 1998, RBX once again went solo and released his follow up album No Mercy, No Remorse on an independent label in 1999. He reappeared with Aftermath to cameo on Eminem's The Marshall Mathers LP in 2000.

=== 2022–present: Hibernation Shivers ===
In 2022, RBX began work with Los Angeles based producers Sccit & Siavash The Grouch on his comeback album Hibernation Shivers. The Labcabin Records release includes features from Spice-1, MC Eiht, Daz Dillinger, Fatlip, Project Pat, Ras Kass, Eligh, Cold 187um, Krayzie Bone, Butch Cassidy, Kurupt, Smoov-E & more. On April 20, 2022, RBX assisted Fatlip with the release of a single for Fatlip’s album, “Torpor”, in the Sccit & Siavash The Grouch produced song titled “Wake Up”. The single was accompanied by a music video, which was themed around the Los Angeles homeless epidemic. On July 7, 2023, RBX released the first single from “Hibernation Shivers”, titled “Nightstalker”. The single, which features Krayzie Bone, is a re-imagining of the infamous Los Angeles serial killer Richard Ramirez. On September 8, 2023, RBX released the second single from “Hibernation Shivers”, titled “Lets Ride”, which was led by a funky west coast groove reminiscent of golden era G-Funk. The single, featuring Sccit & Klientel, got a video release on September 11, 2023. The “Hibernation Shivers” album was officially released on March 15, 2024 to critical acclaim, with AllHipHop referring to the album as a “masterpiece” while unveiling a new single & video for the album titled “Hibernation” featuring Ras Kass.

== Discography ==
=== Studio albums ===
- The RBX Files (1995)
- No Mercy, No Remorse (1999)
- Ripp tha Game Bloody: Street Muzic (2004)
- The Shining (2005)
- Broken Silence (2007)
- Hibernation Shivers (2024)

=== Collaboration albums ===
- Concrete Criminal Gang with Bigg Rocc (2010)

=== Mixtapes ===
- X1: Westside Radio Vol. 18 (2007)
- X2: Digital Kush (2009)
- X3: Calm Before the Storm (2011)
- X4: Water for Sharks (2012)
- X5: Immortal Instamentalz (The New Bloccmixx) (2014)

=== Extended plays ===
- Tha Equinox (2019)

=== Filmography ===
- Tha Eastsidaz (2000)
- DPG Eulogy (2005)
- Rhyme and Punishment (2011)

=== Guest appearances ===
Title	Year	Other performer(s)	Album
"The Day the Niggaz Took Over"	1992	Dr. Dre, Dat Nigga Daz, Snoop Doggy Dogg	The Chronic
"Lyrical Gangbang"	1992	Dr. Dre, Kurupt, The Lady of Rage	The Chronic
"Stranded on Death Row"	1992	Dr. Dre, Bushwick Bill, Kurupt, Snoop Doggy Dogg, The Lady of Rage	The Chronic
"Serial Killa"	1993	Snoop Doggy Dogg, Tha Dogg Pound, The D.O.C.	Doggystyle
"East Coast/West Coast Killas"	1996	Nas, B-Real, KRS-One (as Group Therapy)	Dr. Dre Presents the Aftermath
"Blunt Time"	1996	Dr. Dre, Roger Troutman	Dr. Dre Presents the Aftermath
"So Watcha Want"	1998	MC Ren, Snoop Dogg	Ruthless for Life
"Bustaz"	1998	Lil' C-Style, Legacy, Tray Deee	C-Style Presents 19th Street LBC Compilation
"Ten Steps and Draw"	1999	Q'sta The Don, B.G. Knocc Out	Finer Things
"Flip Side"	1999	Silva Satin	Escape From Death Row
"Gangsta Love"	1999	Warren G, Nate Dogg, Kurupt	I Want It All
"Trouble"	2000	Daddy V, Nate Dogg, E-White	Non-album single
"Souljas"	2000	504 Boyz, Snoop Dogg	Goodfellas
"Remember Me?"	2000	Eminem, Sticky Fingaz	The Marshall Mathers LP
"Dipp Wit Me"	2001	DPG	Dillinger & Young Gotti
"Remember Me (Remix)"	2001	Eminem, Sticky Fingaz	Shady Lane: Remix Album
"When You See Me"	2001	Bad Azz, Snoop Dogg, Kokane	Personal Business
"Dogghouse in Your Mouth"	2001	Tha Eastsidaz, Suga Free, Soopafly, Kurupt, Ruff Dogg, King Lou, Mixmaster Spade	Duces 'n Trayz: The Old Fashioned Way
"Legend of Jimmy Bones"	2001	Snoop Dogg, MC Ren	Bones
"Freestyle Fellowship"	2001	Freestyle Fellowship	Temptations
"Doin' It Bigg	2002	E-White	Snoop Dogg Presents... Doggy Style Allstars Vol. 1
"The Strong Will Eat the Weak"	2002	Snoop Dogg, Kokane	Snoop Dogg Presents... Doggy Style Allstars Vol. 1
"Light That Shit Up"	2002	Snoop Dogg, Soopafly, Kokane	Snoop Dogg Presents... Doggy Style Allstars Vol. 1
"Not Like It Was"	2002	Snoop Dogg, Soopafly, E-White, Kokane, Latoya Williams	Snoop Dogg Presents... Doggy Style Allstars Vol. 1
"Batman & Robin"	2002	Snoop Dogg, The Lady of Rage	Paid tha Cost to Be da Boss
"My Nine"	2002	Daddy V, Squeak Ru	Compton OG
"Ortiz Anthem"	2002	Fieldy's Dreams	Rock'n Roll Gangster
"Do What You Feel"	2002	Fieldy's Dreams, Polarbear	Rock'n Roll Gangster
"Picasso"	2003	Myka Nyne	A Work in Progress
"XJ9"	2003	Myka Nyne, Brother J	A Work in Progress
"We Came Here 2 Ride"	2003	Warren G	True Crime: Streets of LA OST
"Stand Up"	2004	Tony Smallz	Smoke in tha City
"The Line"	2004	Metrocross	WestCoast Offense Vol. 1
"Gun Down"	2004	Daddy V	OGTV: The Soundtrack
"Don't Lokk at Nann Nigga !"	2004	Lil Half Dead, Depp, Tripp Locc, Young Sagg, Tek	Welcome 2 Tha Chuuch Vol. 1
"DPG Life"	2004	Lil Half Dead, Depp, Tripp Locc, Young Sagg, Tek	Welcome 2 Tha Chuuch Vol. 1
"A.D.I.D.A.C."	2004	Snoop Dogg, Bishop Don Juan, Lil' ½ Dead, Bad Azz, E-White	Welcome 2 Tha Chuuch Vol. 1
"What You Desire"	2004	Snoop Dogg, Xzibit	Welcome 2 Tha Chuuch Vol. 1
"Murda"	2004	Snoop Dogg, Bad Azz	Welcome 2 Tha Chuuch Vol. 2
"Moet"	2004	E-White, Tripp Locc, Snoop Dogg	Welcome 2 Tha Chuuch Vol. 3
"Money"	2005	Bigg Steele	Size Duz Matter
"I'm Broad"	2005	Coss	Long Beach City Limits Vol. 1
"These Muthafuckaz"	2005	Snoop Dogg	Welcome 2 Tha Chuuch Vol. 4: Sunday School
"Get You Done"	2005	The Brokerage Firm	Tax Returns
"Notorious DPG"	2005	The Lady of Rage, Kurupt	Bigg Snoop Dogg Presents...Welcome to tha Chuuch: Da Album
"Reprisal"	2006	Bigg Steele, Polar Bear	Chronicles of Big Steele Volume 2
"Killing Fields"	2006	Contribution X, Beretta 9, Hailoe	Cobra of the North
"Some Say"	2006	Contribution X, Monk	Cobra of the North
"Iron Hands"	2006	Contribution X, Monk, DJ Gloss	Cobra of the North
"Free"	2006	—N/a	Up Above Records: Carving a New Standard Vol. 1
"Don't Sweat It"	2006	Tha Dogg Pound, Nate Dogg	Cali Iz Active
"Hard on a Hoe"	2006	Tha Dogg Pound, The Lady of Rage	Cali Iz Active
"Need to Learn"	2006	The Visionaries, Rakaa, Brother J, Sadat X, YZ	We Are the Ones (We've Been Waiting For)
"What Does It Takes"	2007	Snoop Dogg, MC Eiht	CT Experience: The DVD Files
"Ruff N Uff"	2007	Korn, Chilly Chill	Rap Sessions
"Bucc 'Em"	2007	Tha Dogg Pound, Snoop Dogg	Dogg Chit
"Voodoo"	2007	X Clan, Quazedelic	Return From Mecca
"Set for Action"	2008	Doc Ce, Prodege	Qualified Hustla
"Ten Steps and Draw"	2009	B.G. Knocc Out	BG Knocc Out Presents... Tha Mixtape
"Ain't Nobody"	2009	Daddy V, Hobo	OG Daddy V Presents Compton N Longbeach
"Wake Up"	2009	Daddy V, Att Will, Gangsta Dresta, Tha Chill	OG Daddy V Presents Compton N Longbeach
"Always Stay on Yoe Toes"	2009	Daddy V, Big2DaBoy, Keboe, KD	OG Daddy V Presents Compton N Longbeach
"Cool, I'm Wit It"	2009	Daddy V, OG Cuicide, Caviar	OG Daddy V Presents Compton N Longbeach
"My Hood"	2009	T-1	Mo Thug West Mixtape Vol. 2: Thug West
"City Lights"	2009	T-1	Mo Thug West Mixtape Vol. 2: Thug West
"Mic Check"	2009	Young Trav, MC Eiht, CMW	The Black & Brown Mixtape Vol. 1
"Freestyle"	2009	Big2DaBoy	Dr. Dre Presents Detox Chronicles Vol. 2
"French Connect"	2010	Daddy V	OG Daddy V Presents LA French Connection
"D.P.G. 2010"	2010	Tha Dogg Pound	100 Wayz
"Another Clip"	2010	Tha Dogg Pound, Soopafly	100 Wayz
"The Preformation"	2010	Bishop Lamont, Kurupt	The Shawshank Redemption/Angola 3
"Everywhere I Go"	2011	Daddy V, Kokane, Tha Chill	Tha Original Hustla
"Intro"	2012	Lil' ½ Dead	Dead Serious
"I Love This Game"	2012	Lil' ½ Dead, Moe Z MD	Dead Serious
"Dos Equis"	2012	Xzibit, The Game	Napalm
"Sleeper Cell"	2018	Brainwash	Amygdala
"Wake Up”	2022	Fatlip, M.O	Torpor
"Mac Dre"	2023	Rory Redmon, Sccit	Tabernacle
"Who Da Hardest?"	2024	Tha Dogg Pound, Snoop Dogg, The Lady of Rage	W.A.W.G. (We All We Got)
