= Cali Iz Active =

Studio album by Tha Dogg Pound
- Released: June 27, 2006
- Recorded: 2005–2006
- Genre: West Coast hip hop; gangsta rap; G-funk
- Length: 69:00
- Label: Doggy Style; Koch
- Producer: Bigg Snoop Dogg (exec.); Battlecat; L.T. Moe; Swizz Beatz; J-Dub; Soopafly; Ryan Leslie; Rick Rock; David Banner; 1500 or Nothin'; Bangladesh; Jazze Pha

Tha Dogg Pound chronology
Dillinger & Young Gotti II: Tha Saga Continuez... (2005)	Cali Iz Active (2006)	Dogg Chit (2007)

Singles from Cali Iz Active
- 1. "Cali Iz Active" Released: June 3, 2006

Cali Iz Active is the fourth studio album by rap group Tha Dogg Pound. It was released through Koch and Snoop Dogg's Doggystyle Records on June 27, 2006.

Besides Daz and Kurupt, the album also features Tha Dogg Pound family (Snoop Dogg, Soopafly, Nate Dogg, RBX, and Lady of Rage). Also appearing are David Banner, Ice Cube, Paul Wall and producers Battlecat, Ryan Leslie, Swizz Beatz and Jazze Pha.

Snoop Dogg has already used the Royal Cash sample in one of his earlier unreleased recordings with DJ Glaze of Foesum. It was titled "True To The Game" and DJ Glaze included it in his mixtape The Lost Tapez

== Critical reception ==
Professional ratings
Review scores
Source	Rating
AllMusic	3.5/5 stars
The A.V. Club	B−
HipHopDX	1.5/5 stars
Prefix	7/10 stars
RapReviews	8/10 stars
Rolling Stone	3/5 stars
USA Today	link
XXL	(L)

Pedro Hernandez of RapReviews said that while the subject matter remains unchanged, he gave praise to the trio's camaraderie throughout the record, and the production and collaborations throughout the track listing from both West Coast and non-West Coast artists, saying that "Overall, Cali Iz Active is a dope West Coast album full of gangsta anthems that are funky enough to be enjoyed by all."

AllMusic editor David Jeffries praised both the chemistry and reinvigorated lyricism of Daz and Kurupt, the production and varied guest list, concluding that "While it's a track or two too long, Cali Iz Active is arguably the strongest album from the crew and a West Coast fiend's dream come true."

Christian Hoard from Rolling Stone said the record "sacrifices deep focus in favor of cameos from Diddy, Nate Dogg, Ice Cube and Paul Wall, but the party-hearty free-for-all feel is good enough, especially on "Keep It Gangsta" and the hooky, brawling Cube feature "It's All Hood.""

The A.V. Club's Nathan Rabin said, "For the first 10 tracks or so, Cali Iz Active qualifies as a surprisingly solid comeback effort, but the disc starts to drag well before it reaches the end of its 68 minutes. Tha Dogg Pound throws a laid-back gangsta party here, but part of being a good host is knowing when to call it a night."

XXL writer Damien Scott was mixed about the album, praising the duo for staying lyrically consistent but was put off by the guest contributions from David Banner and Busta Rhymes and the "misogynistic tracks ("Drop Your Drawers" and "She Like Dat")" for lacking the "infectious flavor" that previous DPG efforts contained, concluding that "Aside from the failed reaches for broader acceptance, Daz and Kurupt still manage to corral enough gangsta shit to keep the Cali movement active."

Andres Tardio from HipHopDX heavily panned the record for having "tired subject matter delivered in a tired fashion", criticizing both Daz and Kurupt for writing lyrical content that's unoriginal nor memorable, concluding that "[T]his album, instead of solidifying the crew, is simply going to go down as one with filler after filler. So, to answer the question...No, the group didn’t live up to the hype."

== Commercial performance ==
Cali Iz Active debuted at number 28 on the US Billboard 200 chart, selling over 30,000 copies in its first week.

== Track listing ==
No.	Title	Producer(s)	Length
1.	"Cali Iz Active" (featuring Snoop Dogg)	Battlecat	4:44
2.	"Kushn' n' Pushn'"	L.T. Moe	4:08
3.	"Sittin on 23z"	Swizz Beatz	3:45
4.	"Stop Lyin'"	Battlecat	4:19
5.	"It's Craccin' All Night" (featuring Snoop Dogg & Diddy)	Jeffrey "J-Dub" Walker	5:28
6.	"Slow Your Roll"	Soopafly	4:04
7.	"Heavyweights" (featuring Snoop Dogg)	Ryan Leslie	3:57
8.	"Keep It Gangsta" (featuring The Lady of Rage)	Soopafly	5:02
9.	"Hard on a Hoe" (featuring Snoop Dogg, Nate Dogg & RBX)	Rick Rock	4:00
10.	"It's All Hood" (featuring Snoop Dogg, Ice Cube & Traci Nelson)	Battlecat	4:53
11.	"Faknass Hoes" (featuring David Banner)	David Banner	4:14
12.	"Don't Sweat It" (featuring Snoop Dogg, Nate Dogg & RBX)	Swiff D; 1500 or Nothin'	3:53
13.	"Make Dat Pussy Pop" (featuring Paul Wall)	Bangladesh	4:04
14.	"Thrown Up da C"	Soopafly	4:11
15.	"Face 2 Face" (featuring Snoop Dogg & Oliver Brown)	Battlecat	4:23
16.	"She Likes Dat" (featuring Snoop Dogg)	Jazze Pha	3:48

bonus tracks
No.	Title	Producer(s)	Length
17.	"Do What You Wanna"	L.T. Hutton	4:08
18.	"Take Your Drawers Off" (featuring Snoop Dogg)	Jazze Pha	3:30

== Personnel ==
- Dave Aaron - Mixing
- David Banner - Primary Artist, Producer
- Diddy - Primary Artist
- Snoop Dogg - Primary Artist
- Braddon Williams - Engineer
- Leslie Braithwaite - Mixing
- Oliver Brown - Vocals
- Tha Dogg Pound - Primary Artist
- Nate Dogg - Primary Artist
- John Frye - Mixing
- Ice Cube - Primary Artist
- Rich Keller - Mixing
- The Lady Of Rage - Primary Artist
- Ryan Leslie - Producer
- L.T. Moe - Composer, Producer
- Tracy Lee Nelson - Vocals
- RBX - Primary Artist
- Rick Rock - Mixing, Producer
- Soopafly - Mixing, Producer
- Swizz Beatz - Producer
- Paul Wall - Primary Artist

== Charts ==
Chart (2006)	Peak position
US Independent Albums (Billboard)	1
US Billboard 200	28
US Top Rap Albums (Billboard)	4
US Top R&B/Hip-Hop Albums (Billboard)	5
