= A Thin Line Between Love and Hate (soundtrack) =

A Thin Line Between Love and Hate: Music from the Motion Picture

Soundtrack album by various artists
- Released: January 30, 1996
- Recorded: 1995
- Genre: Hip hop; R&B
- Length: 65:16
- Label: Warner Bros.
- Producer: Tim & Bob; L.T. Hutton; Snoop Doggy Dogg; Roger Troutman; Somethin' for the People; R. Kelly; Soopafly; Battlecat; Eric Benét; D'Flow Production Squad; Touch; B-Love; Gizzo; Dwayne

Singles from A Thin Line Between Love and Hate: Music from the Motion Picture
- 1. "Beware of My Crew" Released: November 14, 1995; 2. "A Thin Line Between Love and Hate" Released: April 6, 1996; 3. "I Don't Hang" Released: 1996

A Thin Line Between Love and Hate: Music from the Motion Picture is the soundtrack to Martin Lawrence film A Thin Line Between Love and Hate and was released on 30 January 1996 by Warner Bros. Records.

== Critical reception ==
Professional ratings
Review scores
Source	Rating
AllMusic	link

== Commercial performance ==
The album was certified gold by the RIAA on May 3, 1996, selling over 500,000 copies.

== Track listing ==
Credits adapted from the album's liner notes.

No.	Title	Writer(s)	Producer(s)	Length
1.	"Beware of My Crew" (LBC Crew featuring Tray D and South Sentrell)	LBC Crew, Tray D, South Sentrell	L.T. Hutton; Snoop Doggy Dogg	4:30
2.	"A Thin Line Between Love and Hate" (H-Town featuring Shirley Murdock and Roger Troutman)	Richard Poindexter; Robert Poindexter; Jackie Members	Roger Troutman	4:50
3.	"Damned If I Do" (Somethin' for the People featuring Adina Howard)	Somethin' for the People; Adina Howard	Somethin' for the People	3:54
4.	"Freak Tonight" (R. Kelly)	R. Kelly	R. Kelly	3:57
5.	"I Don't Hang" (Soopafly)	Soopafly	Soopafly	4:58
6.	"Love Got My Mind Trippin'" (Ganjah K)	Ganjah K	Touch	3:30
7.	"Ring My Bell" (Luniz)	Luniz	D'Flow Production Squad	4:20
8.	"Playa fo Real" (Dru Down)	Dru Down	Battlecat	4:15
9.	"Chocolate City" (Roger Troutman featuring Shirley Murdock)	Troutman; Murdock	Roger Troutman	4:39
10.	"Thin Line" (Drawz)	Willie Ford	Willie Ford	4:36
11.	"It's Ladies Night at Chocolate City" (Dark Complexion)	Dark Complexion	Bernard Lilton; Gary Smith	3:49
12.	"Knocks Me Off My Feet" (Tevin Campbell)	Tim; Dwayne	Tim; Dwayne	3:22
13.	"Let's Stay Together" (Eric Benét)	Benét; George Nash Jr.; Demonte Posey	Eric Benét; George Nash Jr.; Demonte Posey	4:53
14.	"Come Over" (Sandra St. Victor)	Tim & Bob	Tim & Bob	5:15
15.	"Way Back When" (Smooth)	Larry Campbell	Larry Campbell	4:28
16.	"Brown Sugar" (D'Angelo)	D'Angelo	D'Angelo	4:23
Total length:				65:16

Notes

- Additional vocals on "Beware of My Crew" performed by Nate Dogg

Sample credits

- "Beware of My Crew" contains samples from:
  - "Heartbreaker", written by Roger Troutman, as recorded by Zapp.

== Charts ==
Chart (1996)	Peak position
US Billboard 200	22
US Top R&B/Hip-Hop Albums (Billboard)	5

== Certifications ==
Region	Certification	Certified units/sales
United States (RIAA)	Gold	500,000^{^}
^{^} Shipments figures based on certification alone.
