= Return from Mecca =

Studio album by X Clan
- Released: January 30, 2007
- Genre: Political hip hop
- Length: 1:12:18
- Label: Suburban Noize Records
- Producer: ACL; Bean One; Damian Marley; DJ Fat Jack; DJ Khalil; DJ Quik; Jake One; J. Thrill; Patrick Shevelin; Proh Mic; Quazedelic; Stephen Marley; UltraMan

X Clan chronology
Xodus: The New Testament (1992)	Return from Mecca (2007)	Mainstream Outlawz (2009)

Professional ratings
Review scores
Source	Rating
AllHipHop	4/5 stars
HipHopDX	3/5
RapReviews	8.5/10
Spin	2/5 stars

Return from Mecca is the third studio album by American hip hop group X Clan. It was released on January 30, 2007 via Suburban Noize Records. Production was handled by DJ Fat Jack, Quazedelic, ACL, Proh Mic, Bean One, Damian Marley, DJ Khalil, DJ Quik, Jake One, J. Thrill, Patrick Shevelin, Stephen Marley and UltraMan. It features guest appearances from Jah Orah, Quazedelic, Abstract Rude, Chali 2na, Daddy X, Damian Marley, Hannah Barbera, Jacoby Shaddix, KRS-One, RBX, Tri State, YZ and Tech N9ne. A music video was directed of the song "Weapon X".

== Background ==
Composed of Brother J, Professor X the Overseer, The Rhythm Provider Sugar Shaft and Paradise the Architect, the original X Clan went on temporary hiatus after the release of their second studio album, Xodus. Member Sugar Shaft died in 1995 because of complications from HIV/AIDS, and Professor X died in early 2006 because of complications from spinal meningitis, leaving only two of the original members.

X Clan leader Brother J added Master China and UltraMan, with whom he previously collaborated working on Dark Sun Riders' Seeds of Evolution album, ACL, DJ Fat Jack and Kumu to the line-up re-forming the group, signing to Suburban Noize. Return from Mecca marks the first X Clan album in 15 years since 1992's Xodus.

== Track listing ==
No.	Title	Producer(s)	Length
1.	"X Clan Album Intro"	DJ Fat Jack	1:41
2.	"Aragorn"	Quazedelic	3:31
3.	"Voodoo" (featuring RBX and Quazedelic)	DJ Khalil	4:25
4.	"Hovercraft Intro"		0:22
5.	"Why U Doin That?"	Bean One	3:20
6.	"Weapon X"	UltraMan	2:55
7.	"Speak the Truth" (featuring KRS-One)	Jake One	5:27
8.	"Positrons"	Quazedelic	2:45
9.	"Mecca" (featuring Jah Orah)	Quazedelic	3:14
10.	"Prison" (featuring Christian Scott)	Proh Mic	4:20
11.	"Atonement" (featuring Jah Orah)	DJ Fat Jack	3:48
12.	"Brother, Brother"	DJ Quik	2:30
13.	"Funky 4 U" (featuring Chali 2na)	Quazedelic	4:33
14.	"Self Destruct"	J Thrill	3:47
15.	"Space People" (featuring Quazedelic)	Quazedelic	4:22
16.	"Trump Card" (featuring Hannah Barbera)	DJ Fat Jack; ACL	3:39
17.	"To the East" (featuring Abstract Rude and YZ)	DJ Fat Jack; ACL	3:50
18.	"Locomotion" (featuring Daddy X and TriState)	Proh Mic	4:11
19.	"Americans" (featuring Jacoby Shaddix)	Patrick Shevelin	3:02
20.	"3rd Eyes on Me"	DJ Fat Jack	2:40
21.	"Culture United" (featuring Damian Marley)	Jr. Gong; Stephen Marley	3:56
Total length:			1:12:18

Hidden track
No.	Title	Length
22.	"Respect" (featuring Tech N9NE)	4:13
