= No Mercy, No Remorse =

Studio album by RBX
- Released: June 29, 1999
- Recorded: 1998–1999
- Genre: West Coast hip hop; gangsta rap; horrorcore
- Label: Street Solid Records
- Producer: Polarbear

RBX chronology
The RBX Files (1995)	No Mercy, No Remorse (1999)	Ripp Tha Game Bloody: Street Muzic (2004)

No Mercy, No Remorse is the second studio album by American rapper RBX, released June 29, 1999 on Street Solid Records. It was produced entirely by Polarbear. The album features guest appearances by Treach of Naughty By Nature and Swedish hip hop group, Infinite Mass.

This release is a fusion between two of RBX's EPs on one CD. Tracks 1 to 7 are from No Mercy, No Remorse and tracks 8 to 14 are from The X-Factor. Track 15 is an untitled hidden track.

== Reception ==
Professional ratings
Review scores
Source	Rating
Allmusic	2.5/5 stars

Allmusic - "Four years after his debut album, The RBX Files, RBX resurfaced on Street Solid with his sophomore effort, No Mercy, No Remorse/The X-Factor. While a four-year wait between albums wouldn't be as big of a deal in jazz, blues, pop, or country, it's an eternity in hip-hop -- a genre in which trends and tastes can change radically in the course of a few years. And when you consider that the release of The RBX Files was delayed a few years because of RBX's problems with Dr. Dre in the early 1990s, you're really talking more than a four-year gap between albums. But delays and all, RBX's rapping style still sounds quite fresh on this 1999 CD...No Mercy, No Remorse/The X-Factor is a respectable, long overdue follow-up from an MC who should have recorded a lot more often in the 1990s."

== Track listing ==
No.	Title	Length
1.	"Forewarning (Intro)"	0:37
2.	"Out Wit Da Old"	4:34
3.	"Heatmizer"	3:55
4.	"Oh No!" (featuring Infinite Mass and Polarbear)	3:39
5.	"The Narrator"	3:51
6.	"Steam Train"	3:56
7.	"Who You Foolin' (Interlude)"	0:43
8.	"Make My Day" (featuring Treach)	3:47
9.	"No Mercy, No Remorse"	3:42
10.	"Ambush and Torture" (featuring Stack-A-Dollar)	4:10
11.	"Move" (featuring Helluva)	4:05
12.	"Gigolo Skalloni"	3:44
13.	"Flatline" (featuring Extreme)	4:00
14.	"Long Beach"	4:22
