= Blacc Balled =

2004 studio album by Lil' C-Style

Studio album by Lil' C-Style
- Released: January 27, 2004
- Recorded: 2003
- Genre: West Coast hip hop
- Length: 47:25
- Label: Rocc Head; Gangsta Advisory
- Producer: Lil' C-Style (exec.); Bigg Daz (also exec.); C-O; E.P.; Fredwreck; Goldie Loc; R. Coleman; Soopafly; Tray Deee

Blacc Balled is the debut studio album by American rapper Lil' C-Style. It was released on January 27, 2004, through Rocc Head Recordz and Gangsta Advisory Recordingz. Production was handled by C-O, Daz Dillinger, E.P., Fredwreck, Goldie Loc, R. Coleman, Soopafly and Tray Deee. It features guest appearances from Daz Dillinger, Spoonie Loc, Lil' Hecc Locc, Quicc 2 Mac, Small Will and Speshyo. Music video was directed by Albert Soratorio and C-O for the title track "Blacc Balled".

== Track listing ==
No.	Title	Writer(s)	Producer(s)	Length
1.	"Let These Niggas Know (Intro)"	Ronald Gillion	C-O	1:05
2.	"Blacc Balled"	Gillion	Fredwreck	4:18
3.	"What U Gone Be When U Grow Up?"	Gillion	C-O	3:57
4.	"Bounce Yo Ridahz" (featuring Daz Dillinger and Quicc 2 Mac)	Gillion; Delmar Arnaud; Samuel Maeshack	R. Coleman	3:45
5.	"G' Style"	Gillion; Tracy Davis	Tray Deee; Goldie Loc	3:18
6.	"Gamblin' Wit Big Style (Skit)"	Gillion	C-O	0:44
7.	"Who Got Some Gangsta Shit, Pt. 2" (featuring Daz Dillinger)	Gillion	C-O; Soopafly	4:21
8.	"Who U Thought I Waz" (featuring Small Will)	Gillion; Small Will	C-O	3:46
9.	"Word on the Street (Skit)" (featuring Spoonie Loc and Lil' Hecc Locc)	Gillion	C-O	0:52
10.	"Heard It Waz a Rumor"	Gillion; Todd Shaw	C-O	3:57
11.	"No Justice, No Peace"	Gillion	C-O	4:03
12.	"A Dedicated Rap"	Gillion	E.P.	4:37
13.	"Hollerin' at a Lil' Stank (Skit)" (featuring Spoonie Loc)	Gillion; Spoonie Loc	C-O	1:50
14.	"I Just Want to Fucc!" (featuring Speshyo)	Gillion; Speshyo	Daz Dillinger	3:44
15.	"Lil' Style Shout Outs!"	Gillion	C-O	3:08
Total length:				47:25

== Personnel ==
- Ronald "Lil' C-Style" Gillion – vocals, executive producer
- Delmar "Daz Dillinger" Arnaud – vocals (tracks: 4, 7), producer (track 14), executive producer
- Samuel "Quicc 2 Mac" Maeshack – vocals (track 4)
- Small Will – vocals (track 8)
- Spoonie Loc – vocals (tracks: 9, 13)
- Lil' Hecc Locc – vocals (track 9)
- Speshyo – vocals (track 14)
- C-O – producer (tracks: 1, 3, 6–11, 13, 15)
- Farid "Fredwreck" Nassar – producer (track 2)
- R. Coleman – producer (track 4)
- Tracy "Big Tray Deee" Davis – producer (track 5)
- Keiwan "Goldie Loc" Spillman – producer (track 5)
- Priest "Soopafly" Brooks – producer (track 7)
- E.P. – producer (track 12)
- Alex "Toon" Deligiannis – artwork, design
- Arnold "Bigg A" White – promotion
