= Mainstream Outlawz =

Studio album by X-Clan
- Released: January 27, 2009
- Recorded: 2008
- Genre: Hip hop
- Label: Suburban Noize Records

X-Clan chronology
Return from Mecca (2006)	Mainstream Outlawz (2009)

Professional ratings
Review scores
Source	Rating
Hip Hop Linguistics	4/5 stars
Underground hip hop.com	4/5 stars
RapReviews.com	8.5/10

Mainstream Outlawz is the fourth studio album of the hip hop group X-Clan. The album consists of 14 tracks and it features artists such Bun B and Supernatural.

== Track listing ==
1. "Down By Law"
2. "Night 2 Day"
3. "Thru My Eyez" (featuring Tony Henry & Bun B)
4. "Prime-Time Lyrics"
5. "The Lord Spits"
6. "Piper's Poetry"
7. "Orientation"
8. "Still Up in the Game" (featuring Poppa Doc & J-Napp)
9. "They Wanna Know"
10. "Do it Like You?!" (featuring Bobby Fine)
11. "Keys to Ur City" (featuring Medusa)
12. "Wiz Degrees"
13. "Armageddon DNA" (featuring Phoenix Orion & Supernatural)
14. "Stop, Look, Recognize"
