= Beware of My Crew =

1995 single by LBC Crew

Single by LBC Crew featuring Tray D and South Sentrell

from the album A Thin Line Between Love and Hate: Music from the Motion Picture
- Released: November 14, 1995
- Recorded: 1995
- Studio: Can-Am Studios (Tarzana, Los Angeles); Larrabee North (North Hollywood, Los Angeles)
- Genre: West Coast hip-hop; gangsta rap; G-funk
- Length: 4:43
- Label: Warner Bros.
- Songwriters: Tray D; Techniec (David K. Williams Jr); Bad Azz; South Sentrell; Lil' C-Style
- Producers: L.T. Hutton; Snoop Doggy Dogg

Music video
- "Beware of My Crew" on YouTube

"Beware of My Crew" is the debut single by LBC Crew from the soundtrack album A Thin Line Between Love and Hate: Music from The Motion Picture. It features Tray D and South Sentrell. The music video for the single features cameos from Snoop Doggy Dogg and Daz Dillinger. The single was released on November 14, 1995.

The song was co-produced by Snoop Doggy Dogg. The keyboards were done by L.T. Hutton and Snoop Doggy Dogg. After Tray D's verse and towards the end of the song, there are background vocals by Nate Dogg. The song's chorus is sung by Roger Troutman. The song was also remixed by DJ Pooh.

== Samples ==
The song contains a sample of "Heartbreaker (Part I, Part II)" by Zapp.

== Live performances ==
LBC Crew, Tray D, and South Sentrell performed the song live on Soul Train on February 24, 1996.

== Charts ==
Chart (1995–1996)	Peak position
US Billboard Hot 100	75
US Hot R&B/Hip-Hop Songs (Billboard)	51
US Hot Rap Songs (Billboard)	8
