= Streetlights (Kurupt album) =

Studio album by Kurupt
- Released: April 20, 2010
- Genre: West Coast hip hop; gangsta rap; hardcore hip hop
- Length: 51:50
- Label: Penagon
- Producer: Terrace Martin (also exec.); Lil' Jon; Pete Rock

Kurupt chronology
Tha Tekneek Files (2009)	Streetlights (2010)	100 Wayz (2010)

Singles from Streetlights
- 1. "I'm Burnt" Released: December 19, 2009; 2. "In Gotti We Trust" Released: April 2, 2010; 3. "Questions" Released: May 4, 2010; 4. "Yessir" Released: June 18, 2010

Streetlights is the sixth solo studio album by American rapper Kurupt. It was released on April 20, 2010, through Penagon Records. The album was produced by Terrace Martin, Lil' Jon, Pete Rock, and Rance. It features guest appearances from J. Black, Problem, Terrace Martin, Snoop Dogg, Tone Trezure, Jah Free, Roscoe, Tri Star, Uncle Chucc, Virginya Slim, Xzibit, and DJ Quik.

The album debuted at number 183 on the Top Current Album Sales, selling 2,900 copies in its first week of release.

== Critical reception ==
Professional ratings
Aggregate scores
Source	Rating
Metacritic	57/100
Review scores
Source	Rating
AllMusic	3.5/5 stars
HipHopDX	3/5
Now	2/5
Pitchfork	4.8/10
RapReviews	4/10
Slant Magazine	3/5 stars
XXL	3/5 (L)

Streetlights was met with mixed or average reviews from music critics. At Metacritic, which assigns a normalized rating out of 100 to reviews from mainstream publications, the album received an average score of 57, based on seven reviews.

AllMusic's Matt Rinaldi wrote: "in the end, Kurupt turns in strong performances on much of Streetlights, delivering furious free association freak-outs and ultimately some of his nastiest verses in years". M.T. Richards of Slant Magazine wrote: "meaningfulness is a noticeable rarity on Streetlights, and the absence of a talented foil like DJ Quik is felt throughout, but the album nonetheless basks in breezy contentment". Chris Yuscavage of XXL resumed: "Kurupt's energy doesn't carry over to every song on Streetlights". Zach Kelly of Pitchfork wrote: "there are bits of great humor and wordplay scattered throughout (occasionally spat out in dizzying double time), the fogged-over choruses, tough-guy posturing ("In Gotti We Trust"), and spurts of disquieting misogyny ("Scrape") feel like too much padding". Pete T. of RapReviews stated: "in 2010 he sounds derivative, uninspired, and starving for a paycheck". Andrew Rennie of Now wrote: "there are moments here, but ultimately Streetlights pales against BlaQKout, the Kurupt/DJ Quik collaboration that dropped last year".

== Track listing ==
No.	Title	Writer(s)	Producer(s)	Length
1.	"Intro"	Ricardo Brown; Terrace Martin	Terrace Martin	3:19
2.	"I'm Burnt" (featuring Problem)	Brown; Jason Martin; T. Martin	Terrace Martin	3:17
3.	"Questions" (featuring Uncle Chucc)	Brown; Charles Hamilton; T. Martin	Terrace Martin	3:04
4.	"In Gotti We Trust" (featuring Xzibit)	Brown; Alvin Joiner; T. Martin	Terrace Martin	2:48
5.	"Face Down" (featuring J. Black, Tone Trezure and Terrace Martin)	Brown; Jeret Griffin-Black; Latonya Givens; T. Martin; Larrance Dopson	Terrace Martin; Rance (co.)	3:02
6.	"Yessir"	Brown; Peter Phillips	Pete Rock	4:27
7.	"All That I Want" (featuring Snoop Dogg and J. Black)	Brown; Calvin Broadus; Griffin-Black; T. Martin	Terrace Martin	3:52
8.	"I'm Drunk" (featuring J. Black)	Brown; Griffin-Black; Marlon Williams; J. Martin; T. Martin	Terrace Martin	3:03
9.	"Scrape" (featuring Terrace Martin, Virginya Slim and Tri Star)	Brown; T. Martin	Terrace Martin	3:03
10.	"Riot in the Club"	Brown; Jonathan Smith	Lil' Jon	4:22
11.	"I'm the Man" (featuring J. Black and Jah Free)	Brown; Griffin-Black; T. Martin	Terrace Martin	4:07
12.	"I'm Burnt (Remix)" (featuring Snoop Dogg, Roscoe and Problem)	Brown; Broadus; David Williams; J. Martin; T. Martin	Terrace Martin	3:36
13.	"Streetlights" (featuring Tone Trezure)	Brown; Givens; T. Martin	Terrace Martin	5:29
14.	"Bounce, Rock, Skate (Kurupted Mix)" (featuring DJ Drama, Snoop Dogg, DJ Quik and Terrace Martin)	Brown; Broadus; David Blake; T. Martin	Terrace Martin	4:21
Total length:				51:50

iTunes bonus tracks
No.	Title	Producer(s)	Length
15.	"Pay Me" (featuring Suga Free, Daz Dillinger and Soopafly)	DJ Quik	4:45
16.	"Chuccs" (featuring Roscoe Umali and Styliztik Jones)		3:48
17.	"Smokin' 4:20"		2:58
Total length:			63:21

== Personnel ==
- Ricardo "Kurupt" Brown – vocals, executive producer
- Terrace Martin – vocals (tracks: 5, 9, 14), producer & mixing (tracks: 1–5, 7–9, 11–14), recording, executive producer
- Jason "Problem" Martin – vocals (tracks: 2, 8, 12)
- Charles "Uncle Chucc" Hamilton – vocals (track 3)
- Alvin "Xzibit" Joiner – vocals (track 4)
- Jeret "J. Black" Griffin-Black – vocals (tracks: 5, 7, 8, 11)
- Latonya "Tone Trezure" Givens – vocals (tracks: 5, 13)
- Calvin "Snoop Dogg" Broadus – vocals (tracks: 7, 12, 14)
- Eric "Tri Star" McKinney – vocals (track 9)
- Virginia Slimm – vocals (track 9)
- Geoffrey "Jah Free" Edwards – vocals (track 11)
- David "Roscoe" Williams – vocals (track 12)
- David "DJ Quik" Blake – vocals (track 14)
- Tyree "DJ Drama" Simmons – vocals (track 14)
- Marlon Williams – guitar (tracks: 4, 8), bass (track 8)
- Andrew Gouche – bass (track 11)
- Peter "Pete Rock" Phillips – producer (track 6)
- Jonathan "Lil' Jon" Smith – producer (track 10)
- Larrance "Rance" Dopson – co-producer (track 5)
- Aaron Dahl – recording (track 3)
- Alexis Seton – recording (tracks: 8, 13, 14)
- Pete Odell – mastering
- Pascal Kerouche – art direction, design
- Darryl "Joe Cool" Daniel – artwork
- Devin DeHaven – photography
- Justin Lin – A&R
- Chris Ayears – A&R
- John Ahn – A&R
- Suave Management – executive producer(s), management

== Charts ==
Chart (2010)	Peak position
US Current Album Sales (Billboard)	183
US Top R&B/Hip-Hop Albums (Billboard)	38
US Top Rap Albums (Billboard)	19
US Independent Albums (Billboard)	37
