= New York, New York (Tha Dogg Pound song) =

1995 single by Tha Dogg Pound featuring Snoop Doggy Dogg

Promotional single by Tha Dogg Pound featuring Snoop Doggy Dogg

from the album Dogg Food
- Released: 1995
- Recorded: 1995
- Genre: G-funk
- Length: 4:50
- Label: Death Row; Interscope; Priority
- Songwriters: Ricardo Brown; Calvin Broadus
- Producer: DJ Pooh

"New York, New York" is a song from the American West Coast hip hop duo Tha Dogg Pound featuring Snoop Doggy Dogg. The song was released as a promotional single and is the third and final single from their debut album, Dogg Food.

Produced by DJ Pooh, the song was paying homage to Grandmaster Flash and the Furious Five's song of the same name and the city of New York.

== Content ==
The song was produced by DJ Pooh and mixed by Dr. Dre. This song also uses a sample of Grandmaster Flash & the Furious Five's song with the same title. It is also considered being a jab at The Notorious B.I.G. because of the use of a similar beat to the Notorious B.I.G's St. Ides TV ad. However, Kurupt stated that DJ Pooh gave the Notorious B.I.G. the instrumental originally for the St. Ides commercial.

== Music video ==
The music video was filmed on December 16, 1995, in Red Hook, Brooklyn, and at Times Square in Manhattan, New York, and in January 1996 in Carroll Gardens, Brooklyn. In the video, Tha Dogg Pound members are rapping around the skyscrapers in New York. The video, set in New York City, New York, was also heightened when the set was fired upon after New Yorkers felt they were being disrespected with West Coast hip hop artists traveling to New York City to film a music video there during the East Coast–West Coast hip hop rivalry. The music video was originally going to be a dedication to New York City prior to the shooting. East Coast rapper The Notorious B.I.G. called up the Hot 97 radio station with Funkmaster Flex and instigated the incident. After the shooting, Snoop Doggy Dogg and Tha Dogg Pound filmed scenes kicking down a building in New York. It was released for the week ending on February 4, 1996.

== Response ==
In response to this song, East Coast duos, Capone-N-Noreaga and Mobb Deep collaborated with Tragedy Khadafi to release a response song named "L.A., L.A." dissing Tha Dogg Pound as a response to the New York, New York music video which showed Tha Dogg Pound and Snoop Doggy Dogg kicking down buildings in New York. Tha Dogg Pound responded with the track titled NY '87 featuring DJ Quik, Deadly Threat, and 2Pac dissing East Coast rappers Mobb Deep and Tragedy Khadafi which also featured disses towards The Notorious B.I.G., Jeru the Damaja, A Tribe Called Quest, and Channel Live. The track remained unreleased until 2011.

== Live performances ==
Tha Dogg Pound performed the song live on January 4, 1996 at the Gund Arena in Cleveland during the Tribute to Eazy-E tour. They also performed the song live with Snoop Doggy Dogg at the House of Blues in Sunset Strip, West Hollywood, California on July 4, 1996.

== Charts ==
Chart (1995–1996)	Peak position
US R&B/Hip-Hop Airplay (Billboard)	51
