= To the East, Blackwards =

Studio album by X Clan
- Released: April 24, 1990
- Recorded: 1988 – early 1989
- Studio: I.N.S. (New York City)
- Genre: Hip hop
- Length: 45:49
- Label: 4th & B'way; Island
- Producer: Jason Hunter; Lumumba Carson; Claude "Paradise" Gray; Anthony Hardin

X Clan chronology
To the East, Blackwards (1990)	Xodus (1992)

To the East, Blackwards is the debut studio album by American hip hop group X Clan, released on April 24, 1990, by 4th & B'way Records and Island Records. It was produced entirely by the group and recorded at I.N.S. Recording Studios in New York City.

To the East, Blackwards charted at number 97 on the Billboard Top Pop Albums. "Raise the Flag", the album's lead single, peaked at number 12 on the Hot Rap Singles.

== Music and lyrics ==
The album's production is characterized by witty scratching and funk beats, including samples of music by Parliament-Funkadelic, Zapp, and Roy Ayers. The group includes producers Grand Architect Paradise and The Rhythem Provider Sugar Shaft, lead MC Brother J, and Professor X the Overseer, who punctuates Brother J's raps with certain keywords and phrases.

The group's lyrics heavily promote Afrocentrism, railing against racism and socioeconomic oppression of African-Americans, and feature references to African-American revolutionaries and Egyptian places and deities. Music journalist Jon Pareles writes that "they want to shift the cultural credit back to Africa, instilling pride in a younger black generation and revising the historical record (itself a matter of heated debate)".

== Critical reception ==
Professional ratings
Review scores
Source	Rating
AllMusic	4.5/5 stars
Chicago Tribune	3/4 stars
DownBeat	5/5 stars
Los Angeles Times	2.5/5 stars
NME	7/10
Q	2/5 stars
RapReviews	9/10
Record Mirror	3/5
Select	4/5
The Village Voice	C

In a contemporary review for DownBeat, Bill Milkowski wrote that X Clan "offer food for thought with a backbeat ... Their mission is to educate, using hip-hop as the medium. And it's funky, too." In The New York Times, Jon Pareles called it "incantations for the converted ... rapped in the artificial-sounding tones of radio disk jockeys." Robert Christgau of The Village Voice facetiously cited its "hallmarks" as "obscure Egyptological insults and flowing funk beats." He viewed it as a product of the rise in "message rap" at the time and stated, "prophets and demagogues of every description join the myriad of hip hop wannabees, enabling lugs like these avowedly non-'humanist' Brooklynites to make their subcultural dent."

In 1998, To the East, Blackwards was included in The Source's "100 Best Albums" list. In a retrospective review, AllMusic's Andy Kellman cited it as one of the best hip hop albums of 1990. Kellman observed "an infectious vigor with the way each track is fired off" and stated, "X Clan relentlessly pushes its pro-black motives and beliefs, and though the points are vague at times, at no point does it ever grow tiring." John Book of RapReviews felt that, although the beats were "just revisions of the well worn and proven", the album was about "how Brother J and Professor X presented themselves over those beats, it had the feeling of a live show or even a rough demo."

== Track listing ==
#	Title	Songwriters	Producer(s)	Performer (s)
1	"Funkin' Lesson"	J. Hunter, L. Carson, A. Hardin, C. Gray	X Clan	Brother J, Professor X
2	"Grand Verbalizer, What Time is It?"	J. Hunter, L. Carson, A. Hardin, C. Gray	X Clan	Brother J
3	"Tribal Jam"	J. Hunter, L. Carson, A. Hardin, C. Gray	X Clan	Brother J, Professor X
4	"A Day of Outrage, Operation Snatchback"	J. Hunter, L. Carson, A. Hardin, C. Gray	X Clan	Brother J, Professor X
5	"Verbal Milk"	J. Hunter, L. Carson, A. Hardin, C. Gray	X Clan	Brother J, Professor X
6	"Earth-Bound"	J. Hunter, L. Carson, A. Hardin, C. Gray	X Clan	Brother J, Professor X
7	"Shaft's Big Score"	J. Hunter, L. Carson, A. Hardin, C. Gray	X Clan	
8	"Raise the Flag"	J. Hunter, L. Carson, A. Hardin, C. Gray	X Clan	Brother J, Professor X
9	"Heed the Word of the Brother"	J. Hunter, L. Carson, A. Hardin, C. Gray	X Clan	Brother J, Professor X
10	"Verbs of Power"	J. Hunter, L. Carson, A. Hardin, C. Gray	X Clan	Brother J, Professor X
11	"In the Ways of the Scales"	J. Hunter, L. Carson, A. Hardin, C. Gray	X Clan	Brother J, Professor X

== Personnel ==
Credits are adapted from the album's liner notes.

X Clan

- Brother J (Jason Hunter) – production, rapping
- Grand Architect Paradise (Claude Gray) – production
- Professor X the Overseer (Lumumba Carson) – production, rapping
- The Rhythem Provider Sugar Shaft (Anthony Hardin) – production

Technical credits

- George DuBose – photography
- Hugh Aladdin Ffrench – engineering
- Mitchell Hartman – artwork
- Kevin A. McDonagh – design
- Herb Powers – mastering

== Charts ==
Chart (1990)	Peak position
U.S. Billboard Top Pop Albums	97
U.S. Billboard Top Black Albums	11
