= Xodus =

Xodus: The New Testament

Studio album by X Clan
- Released: May 19, 1992
- Recorded: 1991−92
- Studio: I.N.S. (New York, NY); Quadrasonic (New York, NY)
- Genre: Political hip hop
- Length: 52:35
- Label: Polydor; 513 225
- Producer: X Clan

X Clan chronology
To the East, Blackwards (1990)	Xodus: The New Testament (1992)	Return from Mecca (2007)

Singles from Xodus: The New Testament
- 1. "Fire & Earth" Released: November 26, 1991; 2. "Xodus" Released: May 26, 1992; 3. "A.D.A.M." Released: December 1, 1992

Professional ratings
Review scores
Source	Rating
AllMusic	4/5 stars
Chicago Tribune	3/4 stars
Entertainment Weekly	B
Los Angeles Times	3/4 stars

Xodus: The New Testament is the second studio album by American hip hop group X Clan. It was released on May 19, 1992, via Polydor Records. The recording sessions took place at I.N.S. Studios and Quadrasonic Studio in New York. The album was produced by X Clan. It peaked at number 31 on the Billboard 200 and number 11 on the Top R&B/Hip-Hop Albums in the United States. It featured three singles: "Fire & Earth", "Xodus" and "A.D.A.M.".

== Track listing ==
No.	Title	Writer(s)	Length
1.	"Foreplay"	Jason Hunter; Lumumba Robert Carson; Claude Gray	4:07
2.	"Cosmic Ark"	Hunter; Carson; Gray; Kenton Nix	5:36
3.	"A.D.A.M."	Hunter; Carson; Gray; Ralph MacDonald; William Salter	4:44
4.	"Xodus"	Hunter; Carson; Gray; Andrew Noland; Gregory Allen Webster; Walter Morrison; Leroy Bonner; Marshall Jones; Marvin Pierce; Norman Napier; Ralph Middlebrooks; George Clinton, Jr.; Bernie Worrell; William Collins	4:26
5.	"F.T.P."	Hunter; Carson; Gray; Cindy Ann Herron; Dawn Sherrese Robinson; Maxine Jones; Terry Lynn Ellis; Denzil Foster; Thomas McElroy	4:15
6.	"Fire & Earth (100% Natural)"	Hunter; Carson; Roy Hawkins; Rick Darnell; Ry Cooder; Doug Gibson; Gerry Thomas; Harry Jensen; Lenny Fridie; Robert Manigault; Jimmy Castor	6:27
7.	"Holy Rum Swig"	Hunter; Carson; Gray; James Brown	5:13
8.	"Ooh Baby"	Hunter; Carson; Gray; Roy Hammond; Steveland Morris	4:51
9.	"Rhythem of God"	Hunter; Carson; Gray	3:47
10.	"Verbal Papp"	Hunter; Carson; Gray	4:34
11.	"Funk Liberation"	Hunter; Carson; Gray; Clinton, Jr.; David Lee Spradley; Garry Marshall Shider	4:35
Total length:			52:35

Sample credits

- Track 2 contains sample "Funky Sensation" performed by Gwen McCrae
- Track 3 contains sample "Mister Magic" performed by Grover Washington Jr.
- Track 4 contains samples "Funky Worm" by Ohio Players and "Flashlight" by Parliament
- Track 5 contains sample "Hold On" performed by En Vogue
- Track 6 contains samples "The Thrill Is Gone" performed by B.B. King, "Hush, Somebody's Calling My Name" performed by Ry Cooder and "Troglodyte" performed by Jimmy Castor
- Track 7 contains samples "Funky Drummer" and "Brother Rapp" performed by James Brown
- Track 8 contains samples "Impeach the President" by the Honey Drippers and "Love's in Need of Love Today" performed by Stevie Wonder
- Track 11 contains sample "Atomic Dog" performed by George Clinton

== Personnel ==
- Jason "Brother J" Hunter – producer, arranger, mixing
- L. Robert "Professor X" Carson – producer, arranger, mixing
- Claude "Paradise" Gray – producer, arranger, mixing
- Anthony "The Rhythm Provider Sugar Shaft" Hardin – producer (track 6)
- Jessie Torres – recording, engineering
- Kenny Ortiz – recording, engineering
- Mike French – recording, engineering
- Prince Charles Alexander – recording, engineering
- Winston Rosa – recording, engineering
- George DuBose – art direction, photography
- Dana Shimizu – design
- Ron Jaramillo – design
- Toni L. Taylor – illustration
- Lisa Renée Young – coordinator

== Charts ==
=== Weekly charts ===
Chart (1992)	Peak position
US Billboard 200	31
US Top R&B/Hip-Hop Albums (Billboard)	11

=== Year-end charts ===
Chart (1992)	Position
US Top R&B/Hip-Hop Albums (Billboard)	53
