= Let's Play House =

1995 single by Tha Dogg Pound featuring Michel'le

Single by Tha Dogg Pound featuring Michel'le

from the album Dogg Food
- B-side: "Respect"
- Released: November 11, 1995
- Recorded: 1995
- Genre: G-funk
- Length: 3:24
- Label: Death Row; Interscope; Priority
- Songwriters: Ricardo Brown; Delmar Arnaud; Nathaniel Hale; Michel'le Toussaint
- Producer: Dat Nigga Daz

Tha Dogg Pound singles chronology
"What Would You Do?" (1995)	"Let's Play House" (1995)	"Nothin' But the Cavi Hit" (1996)

Michel'le singles chronology
"If?" (1991)	"Let's Play House" (1995)	"Hang Tyme" (1998)

Music video
- "Let's Play House" on YouTube

"Let's Play House" is a song by American hip hop duo Tha Dogg Pound featuring Michel'le. The song is the second single released from their debut album, Dogg Food (1995). Snoop Dogg, Nate Dogg and Michel'le make appearances in both the song and the video. The song begins with a spoken intro from Dr. Dre. The keyboards were done by Priest "Soopafly" Brooks and the song was mixed by Dr. Dre.

== Music video ==
There are black and white clips of Michel'le and the Dogg Pound members playing cards, drinking, and smoking inside a club. Other scenes are in colour and show them at an outdoor party relaxing. The video was directed by Michael Martin and was filmed in July 1995. The music video was released for the week ending on October 27, 1995. It features a cameo by DJ Pooh.

== Original track ==
The song originally featured a very different intro, with different G-funk whistles, various drums in the background, different and more explicit lyrics, a brief verse from Warren G, different pitch in vocals, and an outro verse from Big Pimpin' Delemond that nearly doubled the runtime of the original track versus the final release. The original also does not feature Dr. Dre in the intro. The new track replaced Warren G's verse with one by Daz and Kurupt, and ditched the drums in the original for guitars. This original track never debuted for unknown reasons, but was resurfaced and made public in 2012 with the release of Tha Dogg Pound's compilation album Doggy Bag.

== Live performances ==
Tha Dogg Pound and Michel'le performed the song live on January 4, 1996 at the Gund Arena in Cleveland during the Tribute to Eazy-E tour.

== Charts ==
Chart (1995–1996)	Peak position
UK Club Chart (Music Week)	70
US Billboard Hot 100	45
US Hot R&B/Hip-Hop Songs (Billboard)	21
US Hot Rap Songs (Billboard)	5
US Rhythmic Airplay (Billboard)	30
