= Dogg Chit =

Studio album by Tha Dogg Pound
- Released: March 27, 2007
- Recorded: 2006
- Genre: West Coast hip-hop; gangsta rap
- Length: 1:02:11
- Label: Gangsta Advisory; Koch
- Producer: Kurupt (exec.); Daz Dillinger (also exec.); Ivan Johnson; Soopafly

Tha Dogg Pound chronology
| Cali Iz Active (2006) | Dogg Chit (2007) | That Was Then, This Is Now (2009) |

Singles from Dogg Chit
- 1. "Vibe / A Good Day" Released: 2007

Professional ratings
Review scores
| Source | Rating |
|---|---|
| AllHipHop | 3/5 stars |
| AllMusic | 3.5/5 stars |
| HipHopDX | 2.5/5 |
| Los Angeles Times | 2.5/4 stars |
| RapReviews | 6.5/10 |
| XXL | XL (4/5) |

Dogg Chit is the fifth studio album by American gangsta rap duo Tha Dogg Pound. It was released on March 27, 2007 via Gangsta Advisory/Koch Records. The production was handled by member Daz Dillinger together with Ivan Johnson and Soopafly. It features guest appearances from fellow West Coast hip-hop recording artists Snoop Dogg, Bad Azz, The Game and Too Short, as well as Brotha Lynch Hung, Glasses Malone, Jayo Felony, RBX and former rivals B.G. Knocc Out and Dresta contributed on the bonus tracks.

The album's cover, organized by DPG artist Alex "Toon" Deligiannis, pays homage to the group's debut studio album Dogg Food.

In the United States, the album peaked at number 77 on the Billboard 200, number 24 on the Top R&B/Hip-Hop Albums and number 6 on the Independent Albums charts, selling 11,837 copies in its first week. It was supported by the lone single "Vibe" with an accompanying music video.

== Track listing ==
| No. | Title | Producer(s) | Length |
|---|---|---|---|
| 1. | "Get Out My Way" | Daz Dillinger | 5:17 |
| 2. | "I'll Bury Ya" | Daz Dillinger; Ivan Johnson | 3:55 |
| 3. | "Everybody" | Daz Dillinger; Soopafly | 4:01 |
| 4. | "Anybody Killa" (featuring The Game) | Daz Dillinger; Soopafly | 3:58 |
| 5. | "Mo Murder" | Daz Dillinger; Ivan Johnson | 4:54 |
| 6. | "Vibe" (featuring Snoop Dogg) | Daz Dillinger; Ivan Johnson | 4:08 |
| 7. | "Can't Get Enough" (featuring Too $hort) | Daz Dillinger; Ivan Johnson | 4:52 |
| 8. | "Dat Ain't My Baby" | Daz Dillinger; Ivan Johnson | 4:30 |
| 9. | "Thiz Gangsta Chit Iz Ourz" | Daz Dillinger; Ivan Johnson | 5:20 |
| 10. | "1 in 1 Out" | Daz Dillinger; Ivan Johnson | 4:34 |
| 11. | "Where U From" (featuring Bad Azz) | Daz Dillinger; Ivan Johnson | 4:17 |
| 12. | "Throw Ya Hood Up" | Daz Dillinger; Ivan Johnson | 4:42 |
| 13. | "It'z a Good Azz Day" | Daz Dillinger; Ivan Johnson | 4:13 |
| 14. | "Pull Ya Drawz Down" (featuring Snoop Dogg) | Daz Dillinger; Ivan Johnson | 3:30 |
| Total length: | | | 1:02:11 |

Best Buy bonus tracks
| No. | Title | Producer(s) | Length |
|---|---|---|---|
| 15. | "Blast on 'Em" (featuring Brotha Lynch Hung) | Daz Dillinger; Ivan Johnson | 4:01 |
| 16. | "Bucc 'Em" (featuring Snoop Dogg and RBX) | Daz Dillinger; Ivan Johnson | 4:45 |
| 17. | "Blaze It Up" (featuring Glasses Malone, Jayo Felony, B.G. Knocc Out and Dresta) | Daz Dillinger | 4:30 |

Sample credits

- "I'll Bury Ya" contains a sample from "The Wrong Nigga to Fuck Wit" performed by Ice Cube.
- "Everybody" contains an interpolation of "Hand on the Pump" performed by Cypress Hill.
- "Anybody Killa" contains samples from "Hyperbolicsyllabicsesquedalymistic" performed by Isaac Hayes and "Love Rap" by Spoonie Gee and the Treacherous Three.
- "Can't Get Enough" contains a sample from "Can't Make It Without You" performed by Shawne Jackson.
- "It'z a Good Azz Day" contains an interpolation of "Bring It On" performed by Geto Boys.

== Charts ==
| Chart (2007) | Peak position |
|---|---|
| US Billboard 200 | 77 |
| US Top R&B/Hip-Hop Albums (Billboard) | 24 |
| US Independent Albums (Billboard) | 6 |
