= That Was Then, This Is Now (Tha Dogg Pound album) =

Studio album by Tha Dogg Pound
- Released: November 24, 2009
- Recorded: 2007–2009
- Genre: West Coast hip hop; gangsta rap
- Length: 75:49
- Label: Gangsta Advisory
- Producer: Daz Dillinger (also exec.); Kurupt (exec.); Carlos "Los" Mcswain; D.J Xtra Large; Dawaun Parker; Fredwreck; I.V.; Lil Jon; Problem; Soopafly; Swizz Beatz; Tekneek

Tha Dogg Pound chronology
| Dogg Chit (2007) | That Was Then, This Is Now (2009) | 100 Wayz (2010) |

Singles from That Was Then, This Is Now
- 1. "Cheat" Released: 2008; 2. "Ya'll Know What I'm Doin'" Released: 2009

That Was Then, This Is Now is the sixth studio album by rap group Tha Dogg Pound. It was released through Gangsta Advisory Records on November 24, 2009.

== Track listing ==
| No. | Title | Producer(s) | Length |
|---|---|---|---|
| 1. | "That Was Then, This Is Now" | Daz Dillinger; Soopafly | 3:01 |
| 2. | "Attitude Problem" (featuring Swizz Beatz and Cassidy) | Swizz Beatz | 4:09 |
| 3. | "Deepeegee" | Soopafly | 4:01 |
| 4. | "Rollin' n a Drop Top" (featuring Snoop Dogg and A-Dubb) | Soopafly | 3:47 |
| 5. | "Get $ Paid" (featuring A-Dubb) | Daz Dillinger; I.V. | 3:37 |
| 6. | "Get It Get It" (featuring Roscoe) | Daz Dillinger; I.V. | 4:21 |
| 7. | "How Low" (featuring Problem) | Problem | 3:30 |
| 8. | "Insanity" (featuring Soopafly) | Dawaun Parker; Soopafly | 4:09 |
| 9. | "Money Fold'n" (featuring Krayzie Bone) | Daz Dillinger | 4:45 |
| 10. | "No' Mo' Police Brutality" | Lil Jon | 3:09 |
| 11. | "On & On" | Daz Dillinger; Soopafly | 3:46 |
| 12. | "They Don't Want It" (featuring Soopafly) | Soopafly | 6:16 |
| 13. | "Tha Liquor Store" | I.V.; D.J Xtra Large | 3:11 |
| 14. | "U Gets Nuthin'" (featuring Los) | Carlos "Los" Mcswain | 4:21 |
| 15. | "Cheat" (featuring Pharrell) | Daz Dillinger; I.V.; Tekneek | 4:03 |
| 16. | "Westside Rydin'" | Fredwreck | 4:23 |
| 17. | "Y'all Know What I'm Doin'" (featuring Turf Talk) | Daz Dillinger; I.V. | 3:50 |
| 18. | "Get My Drink On & My Smoke On" | Daz Dillinger; I.V. | 4:18 |
| 19. | "How tha West Was Won" (bonus track) | Daz Dillinger | 3:12 |
| Total length: | | | 75:49 |
