= Dogg Food =

Studio album by Tha Dogg Pound
- Released: October 31, 1995
- Recorded: December 1994 – May 1995
- Studios: Can-Am (Tarzana, Los Angeles); Dre's Crib (Los Angeles)
- Genres: West Coast hip-hop; gangsta rap; G-funk
- Length: 71:19
- Labels: Death Row; Interscope; Priority
- Producers: Dat Nigga Daz; DJ Pooh; Kurupt

Tha Dogg Pound chronology
Dogg Food (1995)	Dillinger & Young Gotti (2001)

Singles from Dogg Food
- 1. "New York, New York" Released: September 17, 1995; 2. "Respect" Released: October 17, 1995; 3. "Let's Play House" Released: November 11, 1995

Dogg Food is the debut studio album by American hip-hop duo Tha Dogg Pound, released on October 31, 1995, by Death Row Records, Interscope Records and Priority Records. The album features guest appearances from Snoop Doggy Dogg, Nate Dogg, Michel'le, The Lady of Rage, Tray Deee, and Mr. Malik. Three singles were released from the album: "Let's Play House" (featuring Michel'le and Nate Dogg), "Respect", and "New York, New York" (featuring Snoop Doggy Dogg).

It debuted at number one on the Billboard 200 chart on November 18, 1995. The album sold 278,000 copies in its first week. Though Dr. Dre was Death Row's top producer, the album was mostly produced by Daz Dillinger, while Dre mixed the album. Dogg Food led the way for Daz to become the top in-house producer for Death Row until his departure in the late 1990s.

The video for the first single, "New York, New York", caused some controversy when Snoop appeared in it kicking down buildings throughout New York. The trailer of Tha Dogg Pound was shot at during the process of making the "New York, New York" video although no one was injured. The song is one of three tracks on the album not produced by Daz, as DJ Pooh provided the beat.

== Background ==
Its controversial lyrics were the subject of shareholder protest. The album was supposed to be released in August 1995, but as a result of the controversy from Time Warner, the release was delayed by two months.

== Critical reception ==
Professional ratings
Review scores
Source	Rating
AllMusic	3/5 stars
The Encyclopedia of Popular Music	3/5 stars
Entertainment Weekly	A
Los Angeles Times	3.5/4 stars
Muzik	2.5/5 stars
Q	4/5 stars
RapReviews	8/10
Spin	5/10

The Encyclopedia of Popular Music wrote that the album "revealed a comparative deftness of touch and a penchant for self-parody largely lacking in [the group's] more esteemed colleagues." The Washington Post opined that Tha Dogg Pound's "variation on what has become a stale formula is less sample-driven than most gangsta funk; instead, it focuses on the formidable verbal flow and rhyme skills of Daz and Kurupt." The Baltimore Sun wrote that "the music here sounds wonderfully fresh, from the growling synth-bass of 'Smooth' to the dreamy, slightly tropical pulse of 'Big Pimpin' 2'." Trouser Press called the album "a low-key, unambitious and only mildly imaginative replay of Doggystyle, rolling over familiar G-funk terrain with the same minimum of venom and violence."

== Commercial performance ==
Dogg Food debuted at number one on both the US Billboard 200 and the US Top R&B/Hip-Hop Albums charts, selling 278,000 copies in its first week (the week ending on November 5, 1995). The album was certified 2× platinum on January 5, 1996.

== Track listing ==
No.	Title	Writer(s)	Producer(s)	Length
1.	"Intro"		Dat Nigga Daz	0:18
2.	"Dogg Pound Gangstaz"	Delmar Arnaud; Ricardo Brown	Dat Nigga Daz	5:22
3.	"Respect" (featuring Prince Ital Joe)	Arnaud; Brown; Delemond Williams	Dat Nigga Daz	5:54
4.	"New York, New York" (featuring Snoop Doggy Dogg)	Brown; Calvin Broadus	DJ Pooh	4:51
5.	"Smooth" (featuring Snoop Doggy Dogg)	Brown; Broadus; Val Young	DJ Pooh	4:35
6.	"Cyco-lic-no" (featuring Mr. Malik)	Arnaud; Brown; Broadus; La Morris Edwards	Dat Nigga Daz	4:56
7.	"Ridin', Slipin' and Slidin'"	Arnaud; Brown; Sentrelle Conerly	Dat Nigga Daz; Dave Swang (co.)	4:02
8.	"Big Pimpin 2"	Williams	Dat Nigga Daz	1:36
9.	"Let's Play House" (featuring Michel'le and Nate Dogg)	Arnaud; Brown; Broadus; Nathaniel Hale; Michel'le Toussaint	Dat Nigga Daz	3:24
10.	"I Don't Like to Dream About Gettin Paid" (featuring Nate Dogg)	Brown; Broadus; Hale	Dat Nigga Daz	5:13
11.	"Do What I Feel" (featuring The Lady of Rage)	Arnaud; Brown; Robin Allen	Dat Nigga Daz	3:31
12.	"If We All Fuc"	Arnaud; Brown; Broadus	Dat Nigga Daz	3:13
13.	"Some Bomb Azz Pussy"	Arnaud; Brown; Broadus	Dat Nigga Daz	4:29
14.	"A Doggz Day Afternoon" (featuring Snoop Doggy Dogg & Nate Dogg)	Arnaud; Brown; Hale	Dat Nigga Daz	2:46
15.	"Reality" (featuring Tray Deee)	Arnaud; Brown	Dat Nigga Daz; Emanuel Dean (co.)	6:16
16.	"One by One"	Arnaud; Brown	Dat Nigga Daz	5:09
17.	"Sooo Much Style"	Arnaud; Brown	Kurupt	5:44
Total length:				71:19

Notes

- "Dogg Pound Gangstaz" features vocals by Snoop Dogg and Big Pimpin
- "Respect" features vocals by Nancy Fletcher, Big Pimpin, and Prince Ital Joe with additional vocals by Dr. Dre
- "New York, New York" features vocals by Snoop Dogg
- "Smooth" features vocals by Val Young, Kevin 'Slow Jammin' James, and Ricky Harris
- "Cyco-Lic-No (Bitch Azz Niggaz)" features vocals by Snoop Dogg
- "Ridin', Slipin' and Slidin" features vocals by Mz. South 'Sentral and background vocals by Kevin 'K.V.' Varnado
- "Big Pimpin 2" features vocals by Big Pimpin and additional vocals by Dr. Dre
- "Let's Play House" features vocals by Nate Dogg and additional vocals by Dr. Dre and Snoop Dogg
- "I Don't Like to Dream About Gettin Paid" features additional vocals by Stacey Smallie and Rochelle Wright
- "If We All Fucc" features vocals by Snoop Dogg
- "Some Bomb Azz Pussy" features vocals by Snoop Dogg, Big C-Style, and Joe Cool
- "A Doggz Day Afternoon" features vocals by Nate Dogg and Snoop Dogg

Sample credits

- "Intro" samples "The Shalimar" by The Last Poets
- "Dogg Pound Gangstaz" samples "No Where 2 Hide" by DJ Pooh feat. Threat & Val Young
- "Respect" interpolates "Afro Puffs (extended remix)" by The Lady of Rage feat. Dr. Dre & Snoop Dogg and "Flash Light" by Parliament
- "New York, New York" samples "You're a Customer" by EPMD, "I Can't Dance" by Genesis and interpolates "New York, New York" by Grandmaster Flash & the Furious Five
- "Smooth" samples "Batterram" by Toddy Tee, "Tha Shiznit" by Snoop Dogg, and interpolates "La Di Da Di" by Doug E. Fresh and Slick Rick
- "Cyco-Lic-No (Bitch Azz Niggaz)" interpolates "Aqua Boogie (A Psychoalphadiscobetabioaquadoloop)" by Parliament
- "Big Pimpin' 2" samples "Big Pimpin'" by Tha Dogg Pound
- "I Don't Like to Dream About Gettin' Paid" samples "Love Will Find a Way" by Lionel Richie and interpolates Paid in Full by Eric B. & Rakim

== Credits and personnel ==
- Dr. Dre – executive producer, producer, writer, mixing engineer
- Suge Knight – executive producer
- Unleashed – art direction
- Paul Foley – digital audio editor
- Henry "Hendogg" Smith – illustration
- Joe Cool – illustration
- Brian Gardner – mastering engineer
- DJ Pooh – mixing engineer, producer, writer
- Daz Dillinger – producer, writer
- Dave Swang – producer, writer
- Emanuel Dean – producer
- Rick Rouse – rhythm guitar
- Carl “Butch” Small – percussion
- Soopafly – keyboards
- Death Row Records, Interscope Records, & Priority Records – label
- Death Row Records & Interscope Records – copyright ©, phonographic copyright ℗
- Cynthia E. Calhoun Publishing, Delmar Arnaud Musiq, Nate Dogg Music & Suge Publishing – publisher
- Death Row Records – distributor
- Big Pimpin’ Delemond – writer, featuring artist
- Big Tray Deee – writer, featuring artist
- Cynthia Calhoun – writer
- Duke Bootee – writer
- Grandmaster Melle Mel – writer
- Kurupt – writer
- The Lady of Rage – writer, featuring artist
- Michel’le – writer, featuring artist
- Mr. Malik – writer, featuring artist
- Nate Dogg – writer, featuring artist
- Prince Ital Joe – writer, featuring artist
- Reggie Griffin – writer
- Snoop Dogg – writer, featuring artist, background vocals
- Sylvia Robinson – writer
- Nanci Fletcher – additional vocals
- Rochelle Wright – additional vocals
- Stacey Smallie – additional vocals
- Val Young – additional vocals, featuring artist
- South Sentrelle – featuring artist

== Charts ==
=== Weekly charts ===
Chart (1995–1996)	Peak position
Australian Albums (ARIA Charts)	56
US Billboard 200	1
US Top R&B/Hip-Hop Albums (Billboard)	1

=== Year-end charts ===
Chart (1995)	Position
US Billboard 200	154
US Top R&B/Hip-Hop Albums (Billboard)	44

Chart (1996)	Position
US Billboard 200	49
US Top R&B/Hip-Hop Albums (Billboard)	16

== Certifications ==
Region	Certification	Certified units/sales
Canada (Music Canada)	Gold	50,000^{^}
United States (RIAA)	2× Platinum	3,000,000
^{^} Shipments figures based on certification alone.

== See also ==
- 1995 in music
- List of albums
- List of number-one albums of 1995 (U.S.)
- List of number-one R&B albums of 1995 (U.S.)
