= LBC Crew =

American hip hop trio

- Origin: Long Beach, California, U.S.
- Genres: West Coast hip hop; gangsta rap; G-funk
- Years active: 1995–1997
- Label: Doggy Style
- Past members: Lil' C-Style; Techniec; Bad Azz

The LBC Crew (Long Beach City Crew) was a hip-hop trio from Long Beach, California. They were the first act to be executively-produced by Snoop Dogg.

During their time with Death Row, the LBC Crew recorded a previously unreleased album entitled Haven't U Heard... which remained unreleased until February 8, 2011 when it was released by WideAwake/Death Row. They had a hit single with the song "Beware of My Crew", from the A Thin Line Between Love and Hate soundtrack album, which was originally intended to be for their debut album. They were featured on Snoop Dogg's second album Tha Doggfather. The group disbanded following the collapse of Death Row. Since then, unreleased material from the group emerged on the underground.

The LBC Crew remained visible figures in West-Coast hip-hop. Bad Azz released two solo albums under the Doggy Style imprint. Lil C-Style remained part of disorganized Death Row camp. Techniec signed to The Game's The Black Wall Street Records, then left to start his own label.

== Break-up ==
Early on in the LBC Crew's lifespan, a small dispute broke out between Lil' C-Style and Snoop Dogg over C-Style's royalties (he claimed he wasn't being paid enough for them). The argument was never settled, resulting in C-Style damaging the original tape of LBC's debut album beyond repair, and telling Snoop he no longer wanted to be part of the group.

== Members ==
- Techniec (original member) (David Keith Williams II)
- Bad Azz (original member) (Jamarr Antonio Stamps)
- Lil' C-Style (original member) (Ronald Gillion)

== Discography ==
=== Studio albums ===
- Haven't You Heard (2011)

=== Soundtrack appearances ===
| Title | Release | Other artist(s) | Soundtrack album |
|---|---|---|---|
| "Beware of My Crew" | 1995 | Tray Deee, South Sentrelle | A Thin Line Between Love and Hate |
| "Out the Moon (Boom, Boom, Boom)" | 1997 | Soopafly, Tray Deee, 2Pac | Gridlock'd |

=== Songs ===
  - "Funk With Your Brain (Interlude)" (originally recorded for the album later included on the Snoop Doggy Dogg compilation album, Death Row: The Lost Sessions Vol. 1)
  - "Tight Situation" (Unreleased)
  - "Blueberry" (originally recorded for the album later included on, Tha Doggfather)
  - "Out the Moon /Boom, Boom, Boom" (originally recorded for the album later included in Gridlock'd soundtrack album with 2Pac replacing Lil' C-Style
  - "Dippin' In My Low-Low" (re-recorded with Shaquille O'Neal for an unreleased Shaq project)
- 1995: A Thin Line Between Love and Hate soundtrack
  - LBC Crew : "Beware of my crew EP" #75 US, #51 R&B, #8 Rap, #23 Dance-Maxi
- 1998: Big C Style Presents: 19th Street LBC Compilation
  - "Flossin'" (Tray Deee, Bad Azz, Lil' C-Style) (re-up)
- 2010: The Ultimate Death Row Box Set
  - "6 Shooter" (Techniec, Bad Azz, Tray Deee, Lil' C-Style)
  - "Doggystyle 96'" (Bad Azz, Techniec, Lil C-Style, Snoop Doggy Dogg, Warren G)

=== Solo projects ===
- Bad Azz – Word on tha Streets (1998)
- Bad Azz – Personal Business (2001)
- Da Hood (including Techniec) – Da Hood (2002)
- Bad Azz – Money Run (2003)
- Bad Azz – Executive Decision (2004)
- Lil' C-Style – Blacc Balled (2004)
- Kam & Yung Bruh (featuring Techniec) – Fruit Pruno 2 (2016)
- Bad Azz – The Nu Adventures of Bad Azz (2018)

== Filmography ==
- February 24, 1996 : Soul Train
  - Season 25, Episode 817 – themselves
- 1995: The Show - themselves
- 1996: A Thin Line Between Love and Hate - themselves
- 1997: Rhyme & Reason – themselves
