= DJ Quik production discography =

The following is a discography of solo production by DJ Quik.

== 1991 ==
=== 2nd II None - 2nd II None ===
- 01. "Intro"
- 02. "More Than a Player"
  - Sample Credit: "Love and Happiness" by Al Green
  - Sample Credit: "Funky President" by James Brown
  - Sample Credit: "Flying Saucers" by Richard Pryor
  - Sample Credit: "Sweet Black Pussy" by DJ Quik
- 03. "If You Want It"
  - Sample Credit: "Hung Up on My Baby" by Isaac Hayes
  - Sample Credit: "Movin" by Brass Construction
- 04. "Be True to Yourself"
  - Sample Credit: "Kung Fu" by Curtis Mayfield
- 05. "Let the Rhythm Take You" (feat. AMG)
  - Sample Credit: "Papa Was Too" by Joe Tex
- 06. "Comin' Like This" (feat. DJ Quik, Hi-C & AMG)
  - Sample Credit: "The Guns of Brixton" by The Clash
- 07. "Underground Terror"
  - Sample Credit: "Life is for Learning" by Marvin Gaye
- 08. "Just Ain't Me"
- 09. "The Life of a Player"
- 10. "Ain't Nothin' Wrong" (feat. DJ Quik)
  - Sample Credit: "Ain't Nothin' Wrong" by KC and the Sunshine Band
  - Sample Credit: "Lady Marmalade" by Labelle
- 11. "What Goes Up"
  - Sample Credit: "Spinning Wheel" by Blood, Sweat & Tears
- 12. "Mystic"
  - Sample Credit: "My Little Girl" by Bobbi Humphrey
- 13. "Punk Mutha Phuckaz"
  - Sample Credit: "All the Way Lover" by Millie Jackson
- 14. "Niggaz Trippin'" (feat. DJ Quik, AMG & Hi-C)
  - Sample Credit: "Genius of Love" by Tom Tom Club
  - Sample Credit: "Give Up the Funk (Tear the Roof Off the Sucker)" by Parliament

=== AMG - Bitch Betta Have My Money ===
- 14. "Nu Exasize"
  - Sample Credit: "Watermelon Man" by Herbie Hancock

=== DJ Quik - Quik Is the Name ===
- 01. "Sweet Black Pussy"
  - Sample Credit: "Ooh Boy" by Rose Royce
- 02. "Tonite"
  - Sample Credit: "Tonight" by Kleeer
- 03. "Born and Raised in Compton"
  - Sample Credit: "Hyperbolicsyllabicsesquedalymistic" by Isaac Hayes
  - Sample Credit: "Hardcore Jollies" by Funkadelic
  - Sample Credit: "She's Not Just Another Woman" by 8th Day
  - Sample Credit: "Compton's N the House" by N.W.A
- 04. "Deep" (feat. 2nd II None & AMG)
  - Sample Credit: "Between Two Sheets" & "Four Play" by Fred Wesley & the Horny Horns
- 05. "Tha Bombudd"
- 06. "Dedication"
- 07. "Quik Is the Name"
  - Sample Credit: "I Just Want to Be" by Cameo
- 08. "Loked Out Hood"
  - Sample Credit: "Do You Like It" by B.T. Express
  - Sample Credit: "Pumpin' It Up" by P-Funk All-Stars
- 09. "8 Ball" (Produced with Courtney Branch & Tracy Kendrick)
  - Sample Credit: "Chameleon" by Herbie Hancock
- 10. "Quik's Groove"
  - Sample Credit: "Without Love" by Peter Brown
- 11. "Tear It Off" (feat. AMG)
  - Sample Credit: "Once You Got It" by B.T. Express
  - Sample Credit: "You Got to Have A Mother for Me" by James Brown
- 12. "I Got That Feelin'"
  - Sample Credit: "I Got That Feelin'" by The Emotions
- 13. "Skanless" (feat. Hi-C, 2nd II None & AMG)
  - Sample Credit: "That's Enough for Me" by Patti Austin

=== Hi-C - Skanless ===
- 05. "Funky Rap Sanga"
- 08. "Compton Hoochi"
- 10. "Bullshit"

== 1992 ==
=== DJ Quik - Way 2 Fonky ===
- 01. "America'z Most Complete Artist"
  - Sample Credit: "N.T." by Kool & the Gang
  - Sample Credit: "Remember the Children" by Earth, Wind & Fire
  - Sample Credit: "The Big Bang Theory" by Parliament
- 02. "Mo' Pussy"
  - Sample Credit: "Shake" by The Gap Band
  - Sample Credit: "I Don't Believe You Want to Get Up and Dance (Oops)" by The Gap Band
- 03. "Way 2 Fonky"
  - Sample Credit: "More Bounce to the Ounce" by Zapp
- 04. "Jus Lyke Compton"
  - Sample Credit: "Hook and Sling" by Eddie Bo
  - Sample Credit: "Wino Dealing With Dracula" by Richard Pryor
- 05. "Quik'z Groove II [For U 2 Rip 2]"
  - Sample Credit: "Africano" by Earth, Wind & Fire
  - Sample Credit: "Explain It to Her Mama" by The Temprees
- 06. "Me Wanna Rip Ya Girl"
- 07. "When You're a Gee" (feat. Playa Hamm)
  - Sample Credit: "I Heard It Through the Grapevine" by Roger Troutman
  - Sample Credit: "UFO" by Richard Pryor
- 08. "No Bullshit" (feat. KK)
- 09. "Only fo' tha Money" (feat. 2nd II None)
- 10. "Let Me Rip Tonite"
- 11. "Niggaz Still Trippin'" (feat. AMG, Hi-C, JFN & 2nd II None)
  - Sample Credit: "Movin'" by Brass Construction
  - Sample Credit: "Let's Dance" by Pleasure
  - Sample Credit: "You Can Make It If You Try" by Sly and the Family Stone
  - Sample Credit: "Ffun" by Con Funk Shun
- 12. "Tha Last Word"

=== Penthouse Players Clique - Paid the Cost ===
- 04. "Trust No Bitch" (feat. DJ Quik, AMG & Eazy-E)
  - Sample Credit: "Funky Worm" by Ohio Players
- 10. "Explanation of a Playa"
  - Sample Credit: "N.T." by Kool & the Gang
- 13. "P.S. Phuk U 2" (feat. DJ Quik & Eazy-E)

=== Various Artists - Class Act (soundtrack) ===
- 06. "A Class Act II (Rap Version)" (Penthouse Players Clique)

== 1993 ==
=== Candyman - I Thought U Knew ===
- 04. "Candyman, Do Me Right"
- 10. "I Thought U Knew"

=== Juvenile Committee - Free Us Colored Kids ===
- 02. "Juvenile Thang" (feat. DJ Quik & Playa Hamm)

=== Various Artists - Menace II Society (soundtrack) ===
- 15. "Can't Fuck wit a Nigga" (DJ Quik feat. KK & JFN) {produced with Robert "Fonksta" Bacon}
  - Sample Credit: "Word 2 Tha D" by AMG
  - Sample Credit: "Deep" by DJ Quik

== 1994 ==
=== Shello - The Homegirl ===
- 03. "Sweet Love and Extasy"
- 04. "Good Thang"
- 06. "Street Niggaz"

=== Str8-G - Shadow of a G ===
- 13. "Bring the Funk (Remix)" [feat. 2nd II None & DJ Quik]

=== Various Artists - Above the Rim (soundtrack) ===
- 05. "Didn't Mean to Turn You On" (2nd II None)
  - Sample Credit: "I Don't Believe You Want to Get Up and Dance" by The Gap Band
- 14. "Crack 'Em" (O.F.T.B.) {produced with O.F.T.B., T.K.O.}
  - Sample Credit: "Playing Your Game Baby" by Barry White

=== Various Artists - Murder Was the Case ===
- 08. "Come When I Call" (Danny Boy) (Produced with G-One)
  - Sample Credit: "Let Me Love You" by Michael Henderson
- 11. "Woman to Woman" (Jewell) (Produced with G-One)
  - Sample Credit: "Woman to Woman" by Shirley Brown
- 12. "Dollaz + Sense" (DJ Quik)
  - Sample Credit: "I Like (What You're Doing to Me)" by Young & Company

== 1995 ==
=== DJ Quik - Safe + Sound ===
- 01. "Street Level Entrance"
- 02. "Get at Me"
  - Sample Credit: "Rigor Mortis" by Cameo
  - Sample Credit: "Conscience" by Sun
  - Sample Credit: "Bitch Betta Have My Money" by AMG
- 03. "Diggin' U Out"
  - Sample Credit: "I Get Lifted" by George McCrae
- 04. "Safe + Sound" (Produced with G-One)
  - Sample Credit: "I Wanna Be Your Lover" by Prince
- 05. "Somethin' 4 tha Mood" (Produced with G-One)
- 06. "Don't You Eat It (Interlude)"
  - Sample Credit: "Don't Fight the Feeling" by One Way
- 07. "Can I Eat It?"
- 08. "It'z Your Fantasy" (Produced with G-One)
  - Sample Credit: "California My Way" by The Main Ingredient
- 09. "Tha Ho in You" (feat. 2nd II None & Hi-C)
- 10. "Dollaz + Sense" {from Murder Was the Case OST}
  - Sample Credit: "I Like (What You're Doing to Me)" by Young & Company
- 11. "Let You Havit"
  - Sample Credit: "Long Stroke" by ADC Band
- 12. "Summer Breeze"
  - Sample Credit: "You Like Me Don't You" by Jermaine Jackson
- 13. "Quik's Groove III" (Produced with Robert Bacon & G-One)
- 14. "Sucka Free" (feat. Playa Hamm)
  - Sample Credit: "Shack Up" by Banbarra
- 15. "Keep tha "P" in It" (feat. Playa Hamm, 2nd II None, Kam & 2-Tone)
- 16. "Hoorah 4 tha Funk (Reprise)"
- 17. "Tanqueray" (Bonus Track)
  - Sample Credit: "Get Up to Get Down" by Brass Construction

=== Kam - Made in America ===
- 04. "That's My Nigga"

== 1996 ==
=== 2Pac – All Eyez On Me ===
- 08. "Heartz of Men"

=== Tony! Toni! Tone! - House of Music ===
- 03. "Let's Get Down" (feat. DJ Quik) (Produced with G-One & Raphael Saadiq)
- 00. "Thinking 'Bout You" (Remix) (Produced with G-One & Raphael Saadiq)

=== Shaquille O'Neal - You Can't Stop the Reign ===
- 06. "Strait Playin'" (feat. Peter Gunz & DJ Quik)
- 00. "You Can't Stop the Reign (Remix)" [feat. The Notorious B.I.G.]

== 1997 ==
=== Adina Howard - Welcome to Fantasy Island ===
- 02. "(Freak) And U Know It" (Produced with G-One & Robert Bacon)

=== Luniz - Lunitik Muzik ===
- 05. "Just Mee & U" (feat. Raphael Saadiq) (Produced with G-One)
  - Sample Credit: "Just, Me & You" by Tony! Toni! Tone!

=== Various Artists - How to Be a Player (soundtrack) ===
- 03. "Hard to Get" (Rick James feat. Richie Rich)
- 18. "If U Stay Ready (Remix)" (Suga Free feat. DJ Quik & Playa Hamm)

=== Suga Free – Street Gospel ===
- 01. "Intro"
- 02. "Why U Bullshittin'?"
  - Sample Credit: "Darling Nikki" by Prince
- 03. "I'd Rather Give U My Bitch"
  - Sample Credit: "Get Down on It" by Kool & the Gang
- 04. "Doe Doe and a Skunk"
  - Sample Credit: "Nights of Pleasure" by Loose Ends
- 05. "Don't No Suckaz Live Here" (Produced with G-One & Robert Bacon)
- 06. "Tip Toe" (feat. DJ Quik & Hi-C)
- 07. "I Wanna Go Home (The County Jail Song)"
- 08. "If U Stay Ready" (feat. Playa Hamm) (Produced with G-One & Robert Bacon)
- 09. "Fly Fo Life"
- 10. "On My Way" (feat. El DeBarge)
- 11. "Secrets"
- 12. "Table Interlude"
- 13. "Dip Da" (Produced with G-One & Robert Bacon)
- 14. "Tip Toe (Reprise)"

=== The Watts Prophets - When the 90's Came ===
- 07. "Trippin'"

=== Various Artists - Soul Food (soundtrack) ===
- 090. "Boys and Girls" (Tony? Toni! Toné! featuring 2nd II None) (Produced with G-One & Raphael Saadiq)

== 1998 ==
=== Deborah Cox - One Wish ===
- 06. "One Wish" (feat. Gangsta D)

=== Various Artists - Caught Up (soundtrack) ===
- 01. Ride On/Caught Up (Snoop Doggy Dogg feat. Kurupt) (Produced with Marc N Tha Dark & Snoop Doggy Dogg)

=== DJ Quik - Rhythm-al-ism ===
- 01. "Rhythm-al-ism (Intro)"
- 02. "We Still Party"
- 03. "So Many Wayz" (feat. 2nd II None & Peter Gunz) (Produced with G-One)
- 04. "Hand In Hand" (feat. 2nd II None & El DeBarge)
- 05. "Down, Down, Down" (feat. AMG, Suga Free & Mausberg)
- 06. "You'z A Ganxta"
- 07. "I Useta Know Her" (feat. AMG)
- 08. "No Doubt" (feat. Playa Hamm & Suga Free)
- 09. "Speed"
  - Sample Credit: "Mom" by Earth, Wind, and Fire
- 10. "Whateva U Do" (Produced with G-One)
  - Sample Credit: "So In Love" by Smokey Robinson
- 11. "Thinkin' Bout U"
- 12. "El's Interlude" (feat. El DeBarge)
- 13. "Medley for A "V" (The Pussy Medley)" (feat. Snoop Dogg, Nate Dogg, 2nd II None, Hi-C, AMG & El DeBarge) (Produced with G-One)
- 14. "Bombudd II"
- 15. "Get 2Getha Again" (feat. 2nd II None, AMG, Hi-C & El DeBarge)
- 16. "Reprise (Medley for A "V")" (Produced with G-One)

=== Jermaine Dupri - Life in 1472 ===
- 14. "Three the Hard Way" (feat. Mr. Black & R.O.C.)

=== Shaquille O'Neal - Respect ===
- 03. "The Way It's Goin' Down" (feat. Peter Gunz)

=== TQ - Westside ===
- 02. Westside Part II (My Melody) [featuring DJ Quik, Hi-C, James DeBarge, Playa Hamm & Suga Free] (Produced with G-One)

=== Various Artists - Down in the Delta (soundtrack) ===
- 15. "The Rain" (Tracie Spencer)

== 1999 ==
=== 2nd II None - Classic 220 ===
- 02. "Up "N" Da Club" (feat. AMG & DJ Quik)
- 03. "Don't U Hide It"
- 04. "Whateva U Want" (feat. AMG & James DeBarge)
- 05. "Make 'Em Understand" (feat. Mausberg)
- 07. "Back Up of the Wall"
- 08. "Y?"
  - Sample Credit: "By Your Side" by Con Funk Shun
- 09. "If U Ain't Fuckin'"
- 10. "Don't Do Dat"
- 11. "Princess" (feat. James DeBarge)
  - Sample Credit: "Yesterday Princess" by Stanley Clarke
- 13. "Got a Nu Woman" (feat. AMG, Hi-C, Playa Hamm & DJ Quik)

=== Snoop Dogg - No Limit Top Dogg ===
- 13. "Doin' Too Much"
- 17. "Buss'n Rocks"
- 19. "Don't Tell" (feat. Warren G, Nate Dogg & Mausberg)

=== Various Artists - Deep Blue Sea (soundtrack) ===
- 10. "Get tha Money (Dollar Bill)" (Hi-C featuring DJ Quik)

=== Various Artists - Suge Knight Represents: Chronic 2000 ===
- 13. "We Don't Love 'Em" (Top Dogg)
- 17. "Late Night" (2Pac Feat. Outlawz & DJ Quik)

== 2000 ==
=== 8Ball & MJG - Space Age 4 Eva ===
- 06. "Buck Bounce" (feat. DJ Quik)
- 12. "Jankie" (feat. DJ Quik)

=== AMG - Bitch Betta Have My Money 2001 ===
- 03. "Perfection"
- 04. "Soak Me Baby" (feat. DJ Quik)

=== DJ Quik - Balance & Options ===
- 01. "Change Da Game" (feat. Mausberg)
- 02. "Did Y'all Feel Dat" (feat. Mausberg & Skaboobie)
- 03. "We Came 2 Play" (feat. AMG & James DeBarge)
- 04. "Pitch in on a Party"
- 05. "I Don't Wanna Party Wit U"
- 06. "Motex Records (Interlude)"
- 07. "Sexuality"
- 08. "How Come?"
- 09. "U Ain't Fresh" (feat. Erick Sermon & Kam)
- 10. "Roger's Groove"
- 11. "Motex Records II (Interlude)"
- 12. "Quikker Said Than Dunn"
  - Sample Credit: "Eazy-er Said Than Dunn" by Eazy-E
- 13. "Straight from the Streets (Interlude)"
- 14. "Speak on It" (feat. Mausberg & AMG)
- 15. "Do Whatcha Want" (feat. Digital Underground & AMG)
  - Sample Credit: "Let's Have Some Fun" by The Bar-Kays
- 16. "Well" (feat. Mausberg & Raphael Saadiq)
- 17. "Quik's Groove V"
- 18. "Do I Love Her?" (feat. Suga Free)
- 19. "Tha Divorce Song" (feat. James DeBarge)
- 20. "Balance & Options (Outro)"

=== Erick Sermon - Def Squad Presents Erick Onasis ===
- 09. "Focus" (feat. DJ Quik & Xzibit)
  - Sample Credit: "It Doesn't Really Matter" by Zapp & Roger
  - Sample Credit: "Aqua Boogie (A Psychoalphadiscobetabioaquadoloop)" by Parliament

=== Mausberg - Non Fiction ===
- 02. "Ring King"
- 04. "Get Nekkid" (feat. DJ Quik & James DeBarge)
- 05. "Tha Truth Is..." (feat. DJ Quik)
- 07. "Anyway U Want 2" (feat. Suga Free & James DeBarge)
- 09. "No More Questions" (feat. DJ Quik)
- 11. "I Can Feel That" (feat. AMG & Hi-C)
- 12. "Bank On It" (feat. 2nd II None & Playa Hamm)
- 13. "Mushrooms"
- 14. "Pimpalistics"
- 15. "Dick Ain't Free"

=== Xzibit - Restless ===
- 15. "Sorry I'm Away So Much" (feat. DJ Quik & Suga Free)

== 2001 ==
=== 2Pac - Until the End of Time ===
- 10. "Words 2 My First Born" (feat. Above the Law)

=== Big Syke - Big Syke Daddy ===
- 04. "Time Iz Money" (feat. DJ Quik & E-40)

=== Janet Jackson - All for You ===
- 02. "All for You (DJ Quik Remix)"

=== Kurupt - Space Boogie: Smoke Oddessey ===
- 06. "Can't Go Wrong" (feat. DJ Quik & Butch Cassidy

=== Won G. - No Better Than This ===
- 03. "Nothing's Wrong" (feat. DJ Quik & James DeBarge)

== 2002 ==
=== 2Pac - Better Dayz ===
- 11. "Late Night" (feat. DJ Quik & Outlawz)
  - Sample Credit: "Have Your Ass Home by 11:00" by Richard Pryor
  - Sample Credit: "Wind Parade" by Donald Byrd
  - Sample Credit: "Last Night Changed It All (I Really Had a Ball)" by Esther Williams

=== DJ Quik - Under tha Influence ===
- 01. "Tha Proem" (feat. Hi-C, Talib Kweli & Shyheim)
  - Sample Credit: "Love and Happiness" by Al Green
- 02. "Trouble" (feat. AMG)
- 03. "Come 2Nyte" (feat. Truth Hurts)
- 05. "Murda 1 Case" (feat. KK & Pharoahe Monch)
- 06. "Ev'ryday" (feat. Hi-C & James DeBarge)
- 07. "Get Loaded" (feat. AMG)
- 08. "Gina Statuatorre" (feat. Chuckey)
- 09. "50 Ways"
  - Sample Credit: "50 Ways to Leave Your Lover" by Paul Simon
- 10. "Quik's Groove 6"
- 11. "Get tha Money" (feat. Suga Free)
- 12. "One on 1"
- 13. "Sex Crymee"
- 14. "Birdz & da Beez" (feat. Hi-C & AMG)
- 15. "Oh Well"
- 16. "Out"

=== Shade Sheist - Informal Introduction ===
- 04. "John Doe" (feat. DJ Quik, AMG, Hi-C & Swift)

=== Talib Kweli - Quality ===
- 10. "Put it in the Air" (feat. DJ Quik)

=== Truth Hurts - Truthfully Speaking ===
- 02. "Addictive" (feat. Rakim)
  - Sample Credit: "Thoda Resham Lagta Hai" by Lata Mangeshkar
- 08. "Not Really Lookin'" (feat. DJ Quik)

== 2003 ==
=== Chingy - Jackpot ===
- 16. "Bagg Up"

=== E-40 - Breakin' News ===
- 18. "Quarterbackin' (DJ Quik Remix)" (feat. Clipse)

=== Frost - Somethin' 4 the Riderz ===
- 17. "Let's Make a V" (feat. DJ Quik, King Tee & James DeBarge) {from King Tee's 1998 album Thy Kingdom Come}

=== Hi-C - The Hi-Life Hustle ===
- 02. "Say Woop" (feat. Suga Free)
- 06. "Coochie Coochie"
- 07. "Let Me Know" (feat. DJ Quik & Fiedly)
  - Sample Credit: "So Ruff, So Tuff" by Roger Troutman
  - Sample Credit: "All About U" by 2Pac
- 14. "Hit Me Where It Hurts"
- 15. "Run Up, Done Up"
- 17. "Do It" (feat. DJ Quik)

=== Hot Karl - I Like to Read ===
- 05. "Sump'n Changed" (feat. will.i.am)

=== Jay-Z - The Black Album ===
- 11. "Justify My Thug"
  - Sample Credit: "Justify My Love" by Madonna
  - Sample Credit: "Rock Box" by Run DMC

=== Nate Dogg - Nate Dogg ===
- 03. "Get Up" (feat. Eve)
- 09. "There She Goes" (feat. Warren G & DJ Quik)
  - Sample Credit: "Don't Look Any Further" by Dennis Edwards

=== Rappin' 4-Tay - Gangsta Gumbo ===
- 03. "If It Wasn't 4 U" (feat. Suga Free & Nate Dogg)

=== Roscoe - Young Roscoe Philaphornia ===
- 08. "Get Flipped"

=== Various Artists - Malibu's Most Wanted (soundtrack) ===
- 11. "I Want You Girl" (Butch Cassidy)

=== Various Artists - True Crime: Streets of LA (soundtrack) ===
- 04. "Don't Fight the Pimpin" (Suga Free)

== 2004 ==
=== 2Pac - Loyal to the Game ===
- 17. "Loyal to the Game (DJ Quik Remix)" [feat. Big Syke & DJ Quik]

=== Knoc-turn'al - The Way I Am ===
- 09. "Love Slave"

=== Suga Free - The New Testament ===
- 02. "Why U Bullshittin'? (Part 2)"
- 05. "Angry Enuff"
- 06. "Born Again"
- 10. "Don't Fight Da Pimpin'"
  - Sample Credit: "Don't Fight The Feelin" by Too Short
- 13. "Yo Momma Yo Daddy"
- 14. "She Get What She Pay Foe"
- 15. "Circus Music" (feat. Chingy)

== 2005 ==
=== DJ Quik - Trauma ===
- 01. "Doctor's Office"
- 02. "Intro for Roger"
- 03. "Fandango" (feat. B-Real)
- 04. "Till Jesus Comes"
- 05. "Black Mercedes" (feat. Nate Dogg)
- 06. "Get Up" (feat. The Game & AMG)
- 07. "Get Down" (feat. Chingy)
- 08. "Ladies & Thugs" (feat. Wyclef Jean)
- 09. "Catch 22"
- 10. "Indiscretions in the Back of the Limo" (feat. T.I.)
- 11. "Spur of the Moment (Pacific Coast Remix)" (feat. Ludacris)
- 12. "Quikstrumental (Quik's Groove 7)" (feat. Jodeci)
- 13. "Jet Set"
- 14. "California" (feat. AMG)

=== Do or Die - D.O.D. ===
- 19. "Church" (feat. DJ Quik & Johnny P.)

== 2006 ==
=== Ak'Sent - International ===
- 07. "#1"

=== Maddi Madd - ===
- 01. "Holla Back (featuring Jodeci)"

=== Xzibit - Full Circle ===
- 03. "Ram Part Division"

== 2007 ==
=== Eazy-E - Featuring...Eazy-E ===
- 03. "Trust No Bitch" (Penthouse Players Clique feat. DJ Quik, AMG & Eazy-E)
  - Sample Credit: "Funky Worm" by Ohio Players
- 15. "P.S. Phuk U 2" (Penthouse Players Clique feat. DJ Quik & Eazy-E)

=== Kurupt & J. Wells - Digital Smoke ===
- 14. "I Came In the Door" (feat. Kokane) (Produced with J. Wells)

=== Snoop Dogg - Snoop Dogg Presents: Unreleased Heatrocks ===
- 03. "Wanna B'z" (feat. Young Jeezy & Nate Dogg) (Produced with Teddy Riley)

=== The Fixxers - Midnight Life ===
- 09. "Smoke II Much"

=== Twiztid - Independents Day ===
- 04. "Hurt Someone" (feat. DJ Quik & Tha Dogg Pound)

=== X-Clan - Return from Mecca ===
- 12. "Brother, Brother" (feat. DJ Quik)

=== Yung Joc - Hustlenomics ===
- 06. "Cut Throat" (feat. The Game & Jim Jones)

== 2008 ==
=== Maroon 5 - Call and Response: The Remix Album ===
- 07. "Shiver (DJ Quik Remix)"

=== Murs - Murs for President ===
- 04. "The Science" (Produced with Scoop DeVille)

=== Ray J - All I Feel ===
- 10. "Where You At" (feat. The Game)

=== Snoop Dogg - Ego Trippin' ===
- 02. "Press Play" (feat. Kurupt)
  - Sample Credit: "Voyage To Atlantis" by The Isley Brothers
- 18. "Those Gurlz" (Produced with Teddy Riley & Scoop DeVille)
  - Sample Credit: "Too Much Heaven" by The Bee Gees

=== The Game - LAX ===
- 16. "Dope Boys" (feat. Travis Barker) (Produced with 1500 or Nothin')

== 2009 ==
=== DJ Quik & Kurupt - BlaQKout ===
- 01. "BlaQKout"
- 02. "Cream N Ya Panties" (feat. Tre Mak)
- 03. "Do You Know"
  - Sample Credit: "Anniversary" by Raphael Saadiq
  - Sample Credit: "Back to Life" by Soul II Soul
- 04. "Whatcha Wanna Do" (feat. Yo-Yo & Problem)
- 05. "Ohh!"
- 06. "Fuck Y'all" (feat. Puff Johnson)
- 07. "Hey Playa! (Moroccan Blues)"
- 08. "Exodus"
- 09. "9x's Outta 10"
- 10. "Jupiter's Critic & the Mind of Mars"
- 11. "The Appeal"
- 12. "Problem: The B Stands for Beautiful"
- 13. "Whatcha Wanna Do (Alternative Version)" (feat. Yo-Yo & Problem)

=== Mike Epps - Funny Bidness: Da Album ===
- 16. "I Love the Hoes" (feat. DJ Quik)

== 2010 ==
=== Bishop Lamont - The Shawshank Redemption/Angola 3 ===
- 22. "The Preformation" (feat. Kurupt & RBX)

=== Danny Boy - It's About Time ===
- 01. "Intro"
- 02. "Blow Your Mind Away"
- 03. "How Many Times"
- 04. "Think It's About Time"
- 05. "Between Me And U" (feat. Roger Troutman)
- 07. "So In Love"
- 08. "Church Interlude"
- 09. "Can I Come Over"
- 13. "Steppin'"
- 14. "Mama Used to Say"
- 15. "Come When I Call (Remix)" (Produced with G-One)

=== Kurupt - Streetlights ===
- 15. "Pay Me" (feat. Suga Free) (iTunes Bonus Track)

== 2011 ==
=== DJ Quik - The Book of David ===
- 01. "Fire and Brimstone"
- 02. "Do Today" (feat. BlaKKazz K.K. & Jon B.)
- 03. "Ghetto Rendezvous"
- 04. "Luv of My Life" (feat. Gift Reynolds) (Produced with G-One)
- 05. "Babylon" (feat. Bizzy Bone & BlaKKazz K.K.)
- 06. "Killer Dope"
- 07. "Real Women" (feat. Jon B.)
  - Sample Credit: "Children of the World United" by Angela Bofill
- 08. "Poppin'" (feat. BlaKKazz K.K.)
- 09. "Hydromatic" (feat. Jon B. & Gift Reynolds)
  - Sample Credit: "Greased Lightnin" by John Travolta
- 10. "Across the Map" (feat. Bun B & Bizzy Bone)
- 11. "Nobody" (feat. Suga Free)
- 12. "Boogie Till You Conk Out" (feat. Ice Cube)
- 13. "Flow for Sale" (feat. Kurupt)
- 14. "So Compton" (feat. BlaKKazz K.K.)
- 15. "Time Stands Still" (feat. Dwele)
- 16. "The End?" (feat. Garry Shider)
- 17. "Quik's Groove 9"

=== Nick Cannon - Child of the Corn ===
- 17. "So Westcoast" (feat. DJ Quik) (Produced with G-One)

== 2013 ==
=== Stalley - Honest Cowboy ===
- 01. "Spaceships & Woodgrain" (Produced with Cardo)

== 2014 ==
=== DJ Quik - The Midnight Life ===
- 01. "Intro"
- 02. "That Nigga'z Crazy"
- 03. "Back That Shit Up" (feat. Tay F 3rd & David Blake II)
- 04. "Trapped on the Tracks" (feat. Bishop Lamont & David Blake II)
- 05. "El's Interlude 2" (feat. El DeBarge)
- 06. "Puffin' the Dragon"
- 07. "Pet Semetery"
- 08. "Life Jacket" (feat. Suga Free & Dom Kennedy) (Produced with David Balfour)
- 09. "That Getter" (feat. David Blake II)
- 10. "The Conduct" (feat. Mack 10)
- 11. "Shine" (featuring David Blake II)
- 12. "Bacon's Groove" (feat. Rob "Fonksta" Bacon)
- 13. "Broken Down" (feat. Suga Free & Tweed Cadillac)
- 14. "Why'd You Have to Lie" (feat. Joi)
- 15. "Fuck All Night"
- 16. "Quik's Groove 9"

== 2015 ==
=== The Game - The Documentary 2.5 ===
- 2-10. "Quik's Groove (The One)" (feat. DJ Quik, Sevyn Streeter & Micah)

== 2018 ==
=== Berner - RICO ===
- 05. "Choose Up" (feat. Ty $ & DJ Quik)

== 2025 ==
=== Wiz Khalifa - Kush + Orange Juice 2 ===
- 02. "How We Act" (feat. OT Genesis)
- 12. "Take Your Time Get Paid" (feat. DJ Quik)

== Uncertified ==
- 1999: Snoop Dogg - "Live from L.A." (feat. Ice Cube & Xzibit)
- 2006: Busta Rhymes - "Died Too Soon" (feat. DJ Quik & The Game)
- 2011: Young Ridaz - "Walk on Bye"
- 2011: Potluck - "The Good Life" (feat. Cool Nutz)

== Singles produced ==
List of singles, with selected chart positions and certifications, showing year released and album name
Title	Year	Peak chart positions					Certifications	Album
Title	Year	US	US R&B	US Rap	NZ	UK	Certifications	Album
"Be True to Yourself" (2nd II None)	1991	78	54	9	—	—		2nd II None
"Born and Raised In Compton" (DJ Quik)	1991	—	16	4	—	—		Quik Is the Name
"Tonite" (DJ Quik)	1991	49	13	3	—	—		Quik Is the Name
"Quik Is the Name" (DJ Quik)	1991	—	—	—	—	—		Quik Is the Name
"Explanation of a Player" (Penthouse Players Clique)	1992	—	—	—	—	—		Paid the Cost
"If You Want It" (2nd II None)	1992	64	33	13	—	—		2nd II None
"Jus Lyke Compton" (DJ Quik)	1992	62	37	4	—	—		Way 2 Fonky
"P.S. Phuk U 2" (Penthouse Players Clique featuring DJ Quik & Eazy-E)	1992	—	—	—	—	—		Paid the Cost
"Way 2 Fonky" (DJ Quik)	1992	—	93	—	—	—		Way 2 Fonky
"Didn't Mean to Turn You On" (2nd II None)	1994	—	—	—	—	—		Above the Rim
"Safe + Sound" (DJ Quik)	1995	81	56	21	—	—		Safe + Sound
"Dollaz + Sense" (DJ Quik)	1995	—	—	—	—	—		Safe + Sound
"Summerbreeze" (DJ Quik)	1995	—	110	—	—	—		Safe + Sound
"Let's Get Down" (Tony! Toni! Toné! featuring DJ Quik)	1996	30	4	—	8	33		House of Music
"(Freak) And U Know It" (Adina Howard)	1997	70	32	—	—	—		Welcome to Fantasy Island
"If U Stay Ready" (Suga Free featuring Playa Hamm)	1997	79	39	9	—	—		Street Gospel
"On My Way" (Suga Free featuring El DeBarge)	1997	—	—	—	—	—		Street Gospel
"Ride On/Caught Up" (Snoop Dogg featuring Kurupt)	1997	—	—	—	—	—		Caught Up
"Strait Playin'" (Shaquille O'Neal featuring DJ Quik & Peter Gunz)	1997	—	54	—	47	40		You Can't Stop the Reign
"Down, Down, Down" (DJ Quik featuring Suga Free, AMG & Mausberg)	1998	—	59	—	—	—		Rhythm-al-ism
"Hand in Hand" (DJ Quik featuring 2nd II None & El DeBarge)	1998	38	66	—	—	—		Rhythm-al-ism
"The Way It's Goin' Down" (Shaquille O'Neal featuring Peter Gunz)	1998	—	47	—	—	62		2nd II None
"You'z a Ganxta" (DJ Quik)	1998	—	59	—	—	—		Respect
"Pitch in on a Party" (DJ Quik)	1999	—	68	—	—	—		Balance & Options
"Quikker Said than Dunn" (DJ Quik)	1999	—	—	—	—	—		Balance & Options
"Do I Love Her?" (DJ Quik featuring Suga Free)	2000	—	108	—	—	—		Balance & Options
"Focus" (Erick Sermon featuring DJ Quik & Xzibit)	2000	—	63	—	—	—		Erick Onasis
"Addictive" (Truth Hurts featuring Rakim)	2002	9	2	—	30	3		Truthfully Speaking
"Get Up" (Nate Dogg featuring Eve)	2002	39	81	—	—	—		Nate Dogg
"I'm Not Really Lookin" (Truth Hurts featuring DJ Quik)	2002	—	105	—	—	—		Truthfully Speaking
"John Doe" (Shade Sheist featuring DJ Quik, AMG, Hi-C & Swift)	2002	—	66	—	—	—		Informal Introduction
"Trouble" (DJ Quik featuring AMG)	2002	—	55	—	—	—		Under tha Influence
"Let Me Know" (Hi-C featuring DJ Quik)	2003	—	74	—	—	—		The Hi-Life Hustle
"Black Mercedes" (DJ Quik featuring Nate Dogg)	2005	—	—	—	—	—		Trauma
"Fandango" (DJ Quik featuring B-Real)	2005	—	—	—	—	—		Trauma
"Get Down" (DJ Quik featuring Chingy)	2005	—	105	—	—	—		Trauma
"Ladies & Thugs" (DJ Quik featuring Wyclef Jean)	2005	—	—	—	—	—		Trauma
"Can U Werk Wid Dat" (The Fixxers)	2007	32	107	20	—	—		Midnight Life
"Dope Boys" (The Game featuring Travis Barker)	2008	—	111	—	—	—		LAX
"Those Gurlz" (Snoop Dogg)	2008	—	91	—	—	—		Ego Trippin'
"Hey Playa (Moroccan Blues)" (DJ Quik & Kurupt)	2009	—	—	—	—	—		Blaqkout
"Watcha Wan Do" (DJ Quik & Kurupt featuring Problem & Yo-Yo)	2009	—	—	—	—	—		Blaqkout
"Luv of My Life" (DJ Quik featuring Gift Reynolds)	2011	—	—	—	—	—		The Book of David
"Nobody" (DJ Quik featuring Suga Free)	2011	—	—	—	—	—		The Book of David
"Real Women" (DJ Quik featuring Jon B.)	2011	—	—	—	—	—		The Book of David
"—" denotes a recording that did not chart or was not released in that territory.
