= Erick Sermon discography =

- Studio albums: 8
- Compilation albums: 1
- Mixtapes: 1

This is a discography of American rapper and producer Erick Sermon as a solo artist.

== Studio albums ==
List of studio albums, with selected chart positions
Title	Album details	Peak chart positions				
Title	Album details	US	US R&B	FRA	UK	UK R&B
No Pressure	Released: October 19, 1993; Label: Def Jam; Formats: Cassette, CD, digital download, LP, streaming	16	2	—	—	—
Double or Nothing	Released: November 7, 1995; Label: Def Jam; Formats: Cassette, CD, digital download, LP, streaming	35	6	—	—	—
Erick Onasis	Released: May 16, 2000; Label: DreamWorks; Formats: Cassette, CD, digital download, LP, streaming	53	15	—	—	—
Music	Released: October 30, 2001; Label: J; Formats: Cassette, CD, digital download, LP, streaming	33	8	84	192	30
React	Released: November 19, 2002; Label: J; Formats: Cassette, CD, digital download, LP, streaming	72	13	112	178	29
Chilltown, New York	Released: June 22, 2004; Labels: Def Squad, Universal; Formats: CD, digital download, LP, streaming	61	16	120	—	—
E.S.P. (Erick Sermon's Perception)	Released: September 25, 2015; Labels: Def Squad, Caroline; Formats: CD, digital download, streaming	—	41	—	—	—
Vernia	Released: April 19, 2019; Label: Def Squad; Formats: Cassette, CD, digital download, LP, streaming	—	—	—	—	—
"—" denotes a recording that did not chart or was not released in that territory.

== Compilation ==
Year	Album	Peak chart positions	
Year	Album	U.S.	U.S. R&B
1996	Insomnia: Released: April 23, 1996; Label: Interscope	53	10

== Mixtapes ==
- 2012: Breath of Fresh Air
- 2017: Green Eyed Remixes
- 2018: Green Eyed Remixes 2

== Solo singles ==
List of singles with selected chart positions, showing year released and album name
Title	Year	Peak chart positions			Album
Title	Year	US	US R&B	US Rap	Album
"Hittin' Switches"	1993	—	—	14	No Pressure
"Stay Real"	1993	92	52	1	No Pressure
"Bomdigi"	1995	84	39	9	Double or Nothing
"Welcome" (featuring Keith Murray & Aaron Hall)	1996	—	41	12	Double or Nothing
"Focus" (featuring DJ Quik & Xzibit)	2000	—	—	—	Erick Onasis
"Get Da Money" (featuring Ja Rule)	2000	—	—	48	Erick Onasis
"Why Not" (featuring Slick Rick)	2000	—	—	—	Erick Onasis
"Music" (featuring Marvin Gaye)	2001	22	2	4	Music
"I'm Hot"	2001	—	49	21	Music
"React" (featuring Redman)	2002	36	12	8	React
"Love Iz" (featuring Gregory Howard)	2003	—	80	—	React
"Feel It" (featuring Sy Scott & Sean Paul)	2004	—	93	—	Chilltown, New York
"Make Room" (featuring Sheek Louch & Joell Ortiz)	2015	—	—	—	E.S.P. (Erick Sermon's Perception)
"Clutch" (featuring Method Man & Redman)	2015	—	—	—	E.S.P. (Erick Sermon's Perception)
"—" denotes a release that did not chart or was not released in that territory.

Guest Appearances
Year	Artist	Song	Album
1993	Illegal	We Getz Busy	Heads or Tails
1994	Shadz of Lingo	Mad Flavaz	A View to a KIll
1994	Shaquille O'Neal, Keith Murray	My Style, My Steelo	Shaq-Fu
1994	Ed Lover & Doctor Dre, Keith Murray	It's Goin Down	Back Up Off Me!
1994	Def Squad	Cosmic Slop	Dare Iz a Darkside
1994	Def Squad	How's That	The Most Beautifulest Thing
1995	Funk Flex	Freestyle	The Mix Tape, Vol. 1
1995	Boyz II Men, Def Squad	Vibin' (Remix)	Vibin' 12"
1995	DJ Honda	Game of Death	H
1995	Jodeci	Get on Up (Remix)	Get on Up 12"
1995	Jamal, L.O.D.	Genetic for Terror	Last Chance, No Breaks
1996	Erick	Maintain	Don't Be a Menace to South Central While Drinking Your Juice in the Hood
1996	SWV	On & On	A New Beginning
1996	Too Short, MC Breed	Buy You Some	Gettin' It (10)
1996	MC Breed	To Da Beat Ch'all	To Da Beat Ch'all
1996	Def Squad	Breaker 1, Breaker 2	The Nutty Professor
1996	Def Squad, Busta Rhymes, Jamal	Yeah!	Enigma
1998	Dave Hollister, Redman	The Weekend	Ride
1998	Keith Sweat, Playa	Love Jones	Still in the Game
1998	Def Squad	Down South MCs	Doc's da Name 2000
1999	Chico DeBarge, Redman	(Soopaman Lover Remix)	12"
1999	Ja Rule	E-Dub & Ja	Venni Vetti Vicci
1999	Funk Flex, Redman	Okay	The Tunnel
