= Jus Lyke Compton =

Single by DJ Quik

Single by DJ Quik

from the album Way 2 Fonky
- Released: May 29, 1992
- Recorded: 1992
- Genre: West Coast hip hop; gangsta rap; G-funk
- Length: 4:10
- Label: Profile
- Songwriters: Rob Bacon; David Blake
- Producers: DJ Quik; Rob "Fonksta" Bacon (co.)

DJ Quik singles chronology
"Quik Is the Name" (1991)	"Jus Lyke Compton" (1992)	"Way 2 Fonky" (1992)

Music video
- "Jus Lyke Compton" on YouTube

"Jus Lyke Compton" is a song by American rapper and record producer DJ Quik. It was released in May 1992 as the first single off his second studio album, Way 2 Fonky (1992). The song is produced by DJ Quik and Rob "Fonksta" Bacon. It peaked at numbers 54 and 62 on the US Cash Box Top 100 and Billboard Hot 100.

== Background and release ==
DJ Quik speaks about how so many cities seemed to be heavily influenced by the urban culture of Los Angeles. Some of the cities included Oakland, San Antonio, St. Louis, and Denver. However, the narrative of Denver is filled with contempt as Quik describes an incident that went down during a visit to the town.

== Track listings ==
Vinyl, 12", Promo, 33 ⅓ RPM

1. "Jus Lyke Compton" – 4:10
2. "Jus Lyke Compton (Radio Version)" – 4:10
3. "Jus Lyke Compton (Acapella)" – 1:11
4. "Niggaz Still Trippin'" (featuring AMG & Hi-C) – 4:12
5. "Jus Lyke Compton (Instrumental)" – 4:10

CD single

1. "Jus Lyke Compton (Radio Version)" – 4:10

Vinyl, 7", 45 RPM

1. "Jus Lyke Compton" – 4:10
2. "Tonite" – 5:23

== Charts ==
Chart (1992)	Peak position
US Billboard Hot 100	62
US Hot R&B Singles (Billboard)	37
US Rap Songs (Billboard)	4
US Cash Box Top 100	54
