= Swing'n =

Studio album by Hi-C
- Released: September 28, 1993
- Recorded: 1992–1993
- Studio: Skanless Studios
- Genre: Hip hop
- Length: 56:00
- Label: Skanless Records; Tommy Boy
- Producer: Steve Yano (exec.); Hi-C; Tony-A; LA Jay

Hi-C chronology
Skanless (1991)	Swing'n (1993)	The Hi-Life Hustle (2003)

Swing'n is the second studio album by American rapper Hi-C. It was released on September 28, 1993, via Skanless Records, then later re-released with two bonus tracks on August 31, 2004, by Hi-Life Records and Image Entertainment. The album peaked at number 63 on the Billboard Top R&B/Hip-Hop Albums chart and number 12 on the Heatseekers Albums chart.

== Track listing ==
No.	Title	Producer(s)	Length
1.	"Fuck a 40 Oz."	Hi-C	3:20
2.	"Swing'n"	Hi-C	3:39
3.	"Wannabe"	Tony-A	3:27
4.	"Stank" (featuring 2nd II None)	Tony-A	4:29
5.	"What's Going On"	Hi-C	3:52
6.	"Casha's Demo" (featuring Casha)		0:44
7.	"Table Dance"	Hi-C	3:44
8.	"Got It Like That" (featuring Lil' Frogg)	Tony-A	3:41
9.	"Bigger da Betta"	Hi-C	4:12
10.	"Getcha Grind On"	Tony-A	4:17
11.	"Devil Made Me Do It"	Hi-C	4:23
12.	"Stress'n" (featuring Big Jazz & Lil' Frogg)	Tony-A	3:48
13.	"Shout to Ya" (featuring Step)	L.A. Jay; Tony-A	3:38
14.	"Get the Money" (Bonus track)		4:30
15.	"Ph Ph" (Bonus track)		4:10
Total length:			56:00

== Personnel ==
- Crawford Wilkerson – main artist, producer (tracks: 1, 2, 5, 7, 9, 11)
- Kelton L. McDonald – featured artist (track 4)
- Deon Barnett – featured artist (track 4)
- Lil' Frogg – featured artist (tracks: 8, 12)
- Casha – featured artist (track 6)
- Big Jazz – featured artist (track 12)
- Step – featured artist (track 13)
- Tony Robert Alvarez – producer (tracks: 3, 4, 8, 10, 12, 13)
- John Barnes III – producer (track 13)
- Brian "B-Sly" Foxworthy – engineering, mixing
- Big Bass Brian – mastering
- Steve Yano – executive producer

== Charts ==
Chart (1993)	Peak position
US Top R&B/Hip-Hop Albums (Billboard)	63
US Heatseekers Albums (Billboard)	12
