= Get the Money (disambiguation) =

Get the Money is a 2019 album by Taylor Hawkins and the Coattail Riders.

Get the Money may also refer to:

- "Get da Money", a 2000 song by Erick Sermon
- "Get the Money", a song from the 1993 soundtrack Arizona Dream

== See also ==
- "Get Money", a song by Junior M.A.F.I.A.
- "Get Dis Money", a song by Slum Village from Fantastic, Vol. 2
