= The Book of David =

Studio album by DJ Quik
- Released: April 19, 2011
- Recorded: December 2009–December 2010
- Genre: Hip hop
- Length: 61:01
- Label: Mad Science; Fontana
- Producer: DJ Quik (also exec.); G-One

DJ Quik chronology
Blaqkout (2009)	The Book of David (2011)	The Midnight Life (2014)

Singles from The Book of David
- 1. "Luv of My Life" Released: March 8, 2011; 2. "Real Women" Released: March 29, 2011; 3. "Nobody" Released: April 19, 2011

The Book of David is the eighth studio album by American rapper and producer DJ Quik, released April 19, 2011, on Mad Science and Fontana Distribution.

The album debuted at No. 55 on the Billboard 200, selling 10,000 copies in its first week in the United States.

== Background ==
During an interview with Chuey Martinez for KIIS-FM in April 2010, DJ Quik had confirmed that he was done recording the album, but that he was just waiting for the samples to clear. In the interview he stated, "I figure how to come back to music I've done every Breakbeat every Drum pattern that you can possibly do and all the while I feel like I got away from the music that made me want to get into the industry from people like Prince, The Time, The Force M.D.s you know some of these 80's hip hop kind of records and even Michael Jackson used the Roland TR-808 drum machine so I kind of got back into raw drum machines going back to the old drums cause they all got character, so this record is kind of an old feel type of record. Me king of singing like Prince a little like this record I did with Suga Free this is me singing on that record it's just me trying new and fun things that people like me and around me like stating this is the reunion of me and Suga Free after our beef the past few years with many more songs to come also saying he's producing his next upcoming album." On September 27, 2010 a track titled "G-Shit" featuring BlaKKazz K.K. was leaked.

"The whole idea behind this project was not just to make another rap album, I wanted to focus on the overall musical performance process…not just the rapping part. It’s a smart album, it’s everything I wanted it to be."

— DJ Quik

In an interview with Mariel Concepcion from Billboard DJ Quik spoke about the album saying "Lyrically, I'm just kind of being defensive on this album; I'm pointing out some people that have really pissed me off along the way," he says. One of those people might be his sister, who put him in prison for assault in 2006. Rumors about Quik being on drugs or "afraid of the competition"—most specifically Dr. Dre and his forthcoming "Detox" album—have floated around in the past couple of years as to why he hadn't released music since 2005's "Trauma." But Quik, who learned how to play bass guitar in the interim, says that while those speculations might serve for a better story, the real reason is that a few years ago he was awarded custody of his daughter. Still, not all is drama on "David." First single "Luv of My Life" (featuring Gift Reynolds), soon-to-be-released second single "Real Women" (featuring Jon B.) (an accompanying video is currently being shot in Hawaii) and "Time Stands Still" (featuring Dwele) (about a long-distance relationship) all relate to matters of the heart. The marketing plan to roll out "David" carries the same personal theme, according to Rona Mercado, VP of marketing and strategy at the Cashmere Agency, which handles DJ Quik's marketing and publicity. While he does get personal on the album, Quik hopes, if nothing else, that fans will appreciate the workmanship he put into the album. "I know we're in a singles world with iTunes and all, but this record is an ode to the sonically genius," he says. "I hope to affect the industry again and I'm willing to work hard for it."

Confirmed guests include Ice Cube, Bizzy Bone, Bun B, Jon B., Kurupt, Dwele and Gift Reynolds, along with the aforementioned Suga Free.

== Recording ==
DJ Quik stated this was one of his quickest, fastest and smartest records he's ever done he stated in an interview that he started recording for the album in November 2009 and finished in February 2010 and he said a big reason for it being done so fast was his Co-writers from David Foreman getting the ideas out real quick and Jon B. helping with some of the greatest R&B hits they help me speed the album up faster being since I've been out of retail for 5 years If you don't come back in with something to offer and with something worth the wait then i would humbly get out of the game and get another gig, He also stated he had recorded tracks with artists such as Bizzy Bone, WC, Bun B, Ice Cube, Jon B., Dwele and Suga Free he also stated the album is finished and ready to be released there's just a few samples that need to be cleared.

DJ Quik revealed in March 2011 that the recording for the album had already been done for over a year now and the reason why it's taken so long was due to the legal work from clearing samples and guest collaborators signing off, He also revealed how he's one of the only artists to ever get a sample clearance from the 1978 musical film Grease and he also explained how his direction for the album was saying "I didn't approach it to try to do anything new as a matter a fact I tried to do everything old by doing antiquated music by artists such as El DeBarge, Curtis Mayfield, Luther Vandross."

== Singles ==
"Luv of My Life" featuring Gift is the first official single from the album. The song premiered on Power 106 LA on February 1, 2011. The song was released to iTunes on March 8, 2011. The music video was shot in a strip club on April 3, 2011, and released on April 21, 2011.

"Real Women" featuring Jon B. is the second official single from the album. The song was released to iTunes on March 29, 2011.

"Nobody" featuring Suga Free, and Ty$ was set to be the first single after appearing on KIIS-FM on March 15, 2011. The song was later released as the last single on April 19, 2011.

== Promotion ==
On June 10, 2011, to promote the album, DJ Quik performed with the Roots on Late Night with Jimmy Fallon.

== Critical response ==
Professional ratings
Aggregate scores
Source	Rating
Metacritic	79/100
Review scores
Source	Rating
AllMusic	4/5 stars
Pitchfork Media	8.4/10
RapReviews	8.5/10
The Smoking Section	4/5 stars
Spin	7/10
The Washington Post	(favorable)

Spin's Christopher R. Weingarten said that "it's from an incredible year that never existed, blending baroque '80s roller jams, velvety '90s slow-rides, contemporary Dam-Funk swooshwave, and a breakdown with the late P-Funk guitarist Garry Shider. For every vintage Quik banger, there's a rhythmically unique implosion of backmasked 'Paul Revere' drums and Madvillainous drone ('Poppin''). Lyrically, he's back to his old tricks—shitting on haters, shouting out himself, somehow rhyming 'orange' and having 'diamonds like kablooie'."

== Commercial performance ==
The album debuted at number 55 on the US Billboard 200 chart, with first-week sales of 9,700 copies in the United States. It also entered at number 5 on the Billboard Top Rap Albums chart, number 12 on the Top R&B/Hip-Hop Albums chart, and number 4 on its Independent Albums chart. As of August 17, 2012, the album has sold 27,000 copies in the United States.

== Accolades ==
Pitchfork placed the album at number 29 on its list of the "Top 50 albums of 2011". Rap Radar placed the album at number 2 on its list of "2011 Underrated Albums". Yahoo Music placed the album at number forty three of "The 100 Best Albums of 2011".

== Track listing ==
The Book of David track listing
No.	Title	Writer(s)	Producer(s)	Length
1.	"Fire and Brimstone"	David Blake	DJ Quik	3:47
2.	"Do Today" (featuring Jon B. & BlaKKazz K.K.)	Blake; Jonathan Buck; Kelton McDonald	DJ Quik	4:21
3.	"Ghetto Rendezvous"	Blake	DJ Quik	3:34
4.	"Luv of My Life" (featuring Gift Reynolds)	Blake; George Archie	DJ Quik; G-One	4:08
5.	"Babylon" (featuring BlaKKazz K.K. & Bizzy Bone)	Blake; Bryon Anthony McCane, Jr.; McDonald	DJ Quik	3:38
6.	"Killer Dope"	Blake	DJ Quik	4:50
7.	"Real Women" (featuring Jon B.)	Blake; Angela Bofill; Buck	DJ Quik	4:03
8.	"Poppin'" (featuring BlaKKazz K.K.)	Blake, McDonald	DJ Quik	3:40
9.	"Hydromatic" (featuring Gift Reynolds & Jon B.)	Blake; Buck; Jim Jacobs	DJ Quik	2:57
10.	"Across the Map" (featuring Bizzy Bone & Bun B)	Blake; Bernard Freeman; McCane	DJ Quik	2:58
11.	"Nobody" (featuring Suga Free)	Blake; Dejuan Walker	DJ Quik	3:37
12.	"Boogie Till You Conk Out" (featuring Ice Cube)	Blake; O'Shea Jackson	DJ Quik	3:07
13.	"Flow for Sale" (featuring Kurupt)	Blake; Ricardo Brown	DJ Quik	2:54
14.	"So Compton" (featuring BlaKKazz K.K.)	Blake; McDonald	DJ Quik	3:39
15.	"Time Stands Still" (featuring Dwele)	Blake; Andwele Gardner	DJ Quik	4:29
16.	"The End?" (featuring Garry Shider)	Blake; Garry Shider	DJ Quik	5:19

Sample credits

- "Real Women" contains samples of "Children of the World United", written by Angela Bofill.
- "Hydromatic" contains elements of "Greased Lightnin", written by John Travolta, Warren Casey and Jim Jacobs.

== Personnel ==
Credits for The Book of David adapted from Allmusic.

- Bun B - vocals
- Jon B. - vocals
- David Balfour - fender rhodes
- Bizzy Bone - vocals
- Jonathan "JP" Chavez - design, packaging
- Ice Cube - vocals
- Dwele - vocals
- Dave Foreman - bass, guitar, keyboards
- Suga Free - vocals
- BlaKKazz K.K. - vocals
- Kurupt - vocals
- Justin Li - A&R
- Kiki Luster - project assistant
- Terrace Martin - keyboards
- G-One - producer, vocals
- Jorge Peniche - design, packaging, photography
- DJ Quik - drum machine, drums, editing, engineer, executive producer, keyboards, mixing, operation, pro-tools, producer, programming, sequencing
- Russell Redeaux - management
- Gift Reynolds - vocals
- Garry Shider - guitar, vocals
- Derrick "D-Loc" Walker - percussion
- William "Fuzzy Fantabulous" West - project assistant

== Charts ==
Chart (2011)	Peak position
US Billboard 200	55
US Billboard Top R&B/Hip-Hop Albums	12
US Billboard Top Rap Albums	5
US Billboard Independent Albums	4
US Billboard Tastemakers	7
