= Skanless =

Studio album by Hi-C
- Released: December 10, 1991
- Recorded: 1990–1991
- Studio: Audio Achievements (Torrance, California); Skanless Studios
- Genre: West Coast hip hop
- Length: 51:50
- Label: Skanless/Hollywood
- Producer: Steve Yano (also exec.); Tony-A; Hi-C; DJ Quik

Hi-C chronology
Skanless (1991)	Swing'n (1993)

Singles from Skanless
- 1. "I'm Not Your Puppet" Released: 1991; 2. "Leave My Curl Alone" Released: 1992; 3. "Sittin' in the Park" Released: 1992

Skanless is the debut studio album by American rapper Hi-C, from Compton, California. It was released on December 10, 1991, via Skanless Records and Hollywood Records; Hollywood decided not to use its logos on the album's packaging. The album peaked at number 152 on the Billboard 200, number 53 on the Top R&B Albums chart, and number 3 on the Heatseekers Albums chart. It spawned three singles: "I'm Not Your Puppet", "Leave My Curl Alone" and "Sitting in the Park", which peaked at number 21 on the Hot Rap Songs.

== Critical reception ==
Professional ratings
Review scores
Source	Rating
AllMusic	3/5 stars
RapReviews	7.5/10

Matt Jost of RapReviews critiqued that listeners should not take the album too serious for its "indecent lyrical behaviour", highlighting "2 Drunk ta Fuck" for having the "occasional message" and a "healthy dose of self-mockery", "Jack Move" and "Punk Shit" for delivering the "more familiar, grittier side of the CPT", and "Leave My Curl Alone" and "Sittin' in the Park" for showcasing Hi-C's comedic talents with "an engaging, enthusiastic performance". Jost concluded that: "You'd have to be extremely stubborn not to realize that "Skanless" is primarily about having fun. It may bounce back and forth between adult entertainment and teenage folly, between goofy and tongue-in-cheek, but that's part of its charm. It's part of hip-hop's charm."

== Track listing ==
No.	Title	Producer(s)	Length
1.	"Intro-Scratch"		0:27
2.	"Too Greasy"		0:19
3.	"Leave My Curl Alone"	Tony-A	3:15
4.	"Punk Shit"	Hi-C; Tony-A	2:42
5.	"Funky Rap Sanga"	DJ Quik; Hi-C	4:10
6.	"Request Line" (featuring Angel Montes, Curtis Harmon, Kat Martinez & Nikki Scire)		0:49
7.	"Sittin' in the Park"	Steve Yano; Tony-A	3:28
8.	"Compton Hoochies"	DJ Quik; Hi-C	3:44
9.	"Jack Move"	Tony-A	5:30
10.	"Bullshit"	DJ Quik; Hi-C	5:13
11.	"2 Ada Time" (featuring K.K.)	Hi-C; Tony-A	2:11
12.	"Yo Dick"		0:44
13.	"Froggy Style"	Tony-A	3:08
14.	"2 Drunk ta Fuck" (featuring Big Jazz)	Tony-A	4:43
15.	"Ding-a-Ling"		1:05
16.	"I'm Not Your Puppet"	Steve Yano; Tony-A	6:00
17.	"2 Skanless" (featuring AMG, DJ Quik & K.K.)	Tony-A	4:10
Total length:			51:50

== Samples ==
I'm Not Your Puppet

- "I'm Your Puppet" by James & Bobby Purify
- "Hook and Sling - Part I" by Eddie Bo
- "Impeach the President" by the Honey Drippers
- "Have Your Ass Home by 11:00" by Richard Pryor
- "Atomic Dog" by George Clinton
- "Colors" by Ice-T
- "Dopeman" by N.W.A
- "Kissing My Love" by Bill Withers
- "Go See the Doctor" by Kool Moe Dee
- "Paul Revere" by Beastie Boys
- "Just Say No" by Toddy Tee feat. Mix Master Spade
- "La Di Da Di" by Doug E. Fresh and MC Ricky D

Leave My Curl Alone

- "Dusic" by Brick
- "Back to Life (However Do You Want Me)" by Soul II Soul

Sitting in the Park

- "Sitting in the Park" by Billy Stewart

2 Skanless

- "Tramp" by Lowell Fulson
- "Dizzy" by Tommy Roe
- "You Can Make It If You Try" by Sly & the Family Stone
- "The Payback" by James Brown

Froggy Style

- "Funky Drummer" by James Brown

Punk S***

- "Funky Drummer" by James Brown
- "All Because" by Al Green
- "The New Scooby-Doo Movies" by Hoyt Curtin
- "High" by Skyy
- "So Ruff, So Tuff" by Roger Troutman

== Personnel ==
- Crawford Wilkerson – main artist, producer (tracks: 4, 5, 8, 10, 11)
- David Marvin Blake – featured artist (track 17), producer (tracks: 5, 8, 10)
- Kelton L. McDonald – featured artist (tracks: 11, 17), backing vocals (tracks: 3, 11)
- Jason Lewis – featured artist (track 17)
- Deon Barnett – backing vocals (tracks: 3, 11)
- Angel Montes – featured artist (track 6)
- Curtis Harmon – featured artist (track 6)
- Kat Martinez – featured artist (track 6)
- Nikki Scire – featured artist (track 6)
- Big Jazz – featured artist (track 14)
- Desiree – backing vocals (track 3)
- Nicole – backing vocals (track 3)
- Robert C. Bacon Jr. – rhythm guitar (tracks: 4, 5, 8, 10, 13, 14), bass (tracks: 4, 10, 13, 14)
- Stuart Wylen – guitar & keyboards (tracks: 7, 8)
- Mike "Crazy Neck" Sims – bass & guitar (tracks: 9, 16)
- Tony Robert Alvarez – producer (tracks: 3, 4, 7, 9, 11, 13, 14, 16, 17)
- Steve Yano – producer (tracks: 7, 16), executive producer
- Brian "B-Sly" Foxworthy – engineering & mixing (tracks: 1–8, 10–15, 17)
- Donovan Smith – engineering & mixing (tracks: 9, 16)
- Ron McMaster – mastering
- Maria DeGrassi-Colosimo – art direction
- Jamile G. Mafi – design
- Susan Werner – photography

== Charts ==
Chart (1992)	Peak position
US Billboard 200	152
US Top R&B/Hip-Hop Albums (Billboard)	53
US Heatseekers Albums (Billboard)	3
