= What's the Worst That Could Happen? (soundtrack) =

What's the Worst That Could Happen? (Soundtrack)

Soundtrack album by various artists
- Released: May 29, 2001
- Recorded: 1999–2000
- Genre: R&B; hip hop
- Length: 1:07:49
- Label: NY.LA Music
- Producer: Anita Camarata (exec.); Garnett March (exec.); Louis Burrell (exec.); Bill McGee; Danja Mowf; Herb "Captain Curt" Curtis; Meech Wells; The 45 King; DeVante Swing; Devyne Stephens; Erick Sermon; Hangmen 3; Kenny Flav; Lenio Purry; Lloyd Crucial; RockHead; Terrance Davis

Singles from What's the Worst That Could Happen? soundtrack
- 1. "Wooden Horse" Released: 2000; 2. "Music" Released: June 12, 2001; 3. "Stick 'Em" Released: 2001; 4. "Bang ta Dis" Released: 2001

Professional ratings
Review scores
Source	Rating
AllMusic	3/5 stars

What's the Worst That Could Happen? is the soundtrack album of the 2001 film directed by Sam Weisman and starring Martin Lawrence and Danny DeVito. It was released on May 29, 2001 through NY.LA Music, and consists of a blend of hip hop and contemporary R&B music. The soundtrack found some success on the Billboard charts, making it to number 38 on the Billboard 200, number 6 on the Top R&B/Hip-Hop Albums and number 11 on the Top Soundtracks. Two singles and music videos were released for the songs "Music" and "Bang ta Dis".

== Track listing ==
No.	Title	Writer(s)	Producer(s)	Length
1.	"Fuck What They Say" (performed by Snoop Dogg)	Calvin Broadus; Cecil Womack Jr.	Meech Wells; Keith Clark^{[a]}	3:42
2.	"Stick 'Em" (performed by Cha Cha)	Parris Lynell Fluellen; Devyne Stephens; Marquinarius Holmes	Devyne Stephens; RockHead	4:12
3.	"Wooden Horse" (performed by Craig Mack and Frank Sinatra)		The 45 King	3:42
4.	"No Job" (performed by Sara Jane)	Sara Jane Skeete; Lloydie Crucial	Lloyd Crucial	4:29
5.	"Everywhere You Go" (performed by Queen Latifah and Sara Jane)	Dana Owens; Kenneth Dickerson; Lenio Purry	Kenny Flav; Lenio Purry	4:39
6.	"Bang ta Dis" (performed by Benzino)	Raymond Scott	Hangmen 3	3:39
7.	"What's the Worst That Could Happen?" (performed by Supafriendz)	Joe Day; Adolphus L. Maples III; Donnie Lewis; Lonnie Battle	Bill McGee; Danja Mowf	4:12
8.	"Happy Feelin's" (performed by Sam Logan)	Frankie Beverly	Herb "Captain Curt" Curtis	5:45
9.	"Whatever Jo Wants (Jo Gets)" (performed by Jo Doja)	Day; Maples III; Bill McGee; Jerry Ross; Richard Adler	Bill McGee; Danja Mowf	4:51
10.	"That's the Way Love Goes" (performed by Nina)	Janet Jackson; James Harris III; Terry Lewis	Herb "Captain Curt" Curtis	3:28
11.	"Music" (performed by Erick Sermon and Marvin Gaye)	Erick Sermon; Marvin Gaye	Erick Sermon	3:55
12.	"Ladies Are U Wit Me" (performed by Dyme)	Randy Muller	The 45 King	4:00
13.	"Shoot 'Em Up" (performed by Doggy's Angels)	Chan Gaines; Kimberly Proby; Kola Marion	Meech Wells	4:00
14.	"I Got Duvs on It" (performed by Boss Town)	A. Brooks; Terrance Davis; Anthony Gilmour; Claydes Charles Smith; Dennis Thomas; Denzil Foster; Don Boyce; Garrick Husband; George Brown; Jay King; Jerold Ellis; Richard Westfield; Robert "Kool" Bell; Robert "Spike" Mickens; Ronald Bell; Thomas McElroy	Terrance Davis	4L47
15.	"Hit the Road Jo" (performed by Jo Doja)	Day; Maples III; McGee; Percy Mayfield	Bill McGee; Danja Mowf	4:46
16.	"My Love, Your Love" (performed by Lejit)	Hassan Johnson	DeVante Swing	3:42
Total length:				1:07:49

Notes

- ^{^[a]} signifies a co-producer.

Sample credits

- Track #3 contains samples from "High Hopes" as performed by Frank Sinatra
- Track #9 contains a sample of "Whatever Lola Wants" as performed by Sarah Vaughan
- Track #10 contains elements from "Papa Don't Take No Mess"
- Track #11 contains samples from "Music" as performed by Marvin Gaye
- Track #12 contains a sample of "I'm Gonna Wash That Man Right Outa My Hair"
