= Music (Erick Sermon song) =

2001 song by Erick Sermon, featuring Marvin Gaye

Single by Erick Sermon featuring Marvin Gaye

from the album Music and What's the Worst That Could Happen?
- Released: June 12, 2001
- Recorded: 2000
- Genre: Hip hop
- Length: 3:43
- Label: Interscope, J
- Songwriters: Erick Sermon, Marvin Gaye
- Producer: Erick Sermon

Erick Sermon singles chronology
"Why Not" (2000)	"Music" (2001)	"I'm Hot" (2001)

Marvin Gaye singles chronology
"This Love Starved Heart Of Mine(It's Killing Me)" (1995)	"Music" (2001)	"Where Are We Going" (2015)

"Music" is a song by Erick Sermon featuring archived vocals from Marvin Gaye, released on June 12, 2001 and is the lead single of the album of the same name. The hip hop and soul duet featuring the two veteran performers was released as the leading song of the soundtrack to the Martin Lawrence and Danny DeVito comedy, What's the Worst That Could Happen? The song became a runaway success rising to #2 on Billboard's R&B chart and was #4 on the rap charts. It also registered at #21 pop giving Sermon his highest-charted single on the pop charts as a solo artist and giving Gaye his first posthumous hit in 10 years following 1991's R&B-charted single, "My Last Chance" also bringing Gaye his 41st and last top 40 pop hit.

There's also a remix featuring Keith Murray and Redman.

== Background and writing ==
The song was thought of by Sermon after buying a copy of Gaye's Midnight Love and the Sexual Healing Sessions album, which overlook some of the original album's earlier mixes. After listening to an outtake of Gaye's 1982 album track, "Turn On Some Music" (titled "I've Got My Music" in its initial version), Sermon decided to mix the vocals (done in a cappella) and add it into his own song. The result was similar to Natalie Cole's interpolation of her father Nat "King" Cole's hit, "Unforgettable", revisioned as a duet.

== Legacy ==
The song was featured in the 2011 Matthew McConaughey film The Lincoln Lawyer.

== Charts ==
=== Weekly charts ===
Chart (2001)	Peak position
UK Singles (OCC)	36
UK Dance (OCC)	3
UK Hip Hop/R&B (OCC)	5
US Billboard Hot 100	22
US Hot R&B/Hip-Hop Songs (Billboard)	2
US Hot Rap Songs (Billboard)	4
US Rhythmic Airplay (Billboard)	26

=== Year-End charts ===
Chart (2001)	Position
US Billboard Hot 100	83
US Hot R&B/Hip-Hop Songs (Billboard)	24
