= Music (Erick Sermon album) =

Studio album by Erick Sermon
- Released: October 30, 2001
- Recorded: 2000–2001
- Studios: L.I.T.E. Studios (Long Island, NY)
- Genre: Hip hop
- Length: 47:15
- Labels: Def Squad; J
- Producers: Bernard Alexander (exec.); Erick Sermon (also exec.); Rockwilder

Erick Sermon chronology
Erick Onasis (2000)	Music (2001)	React (2002)

Singles from Music
- 1. "Music" Released: June 12, 2001; 2. "I'm Hot" Released: September 25, 2001

Professional ratings
Review scores
Source	Rating
AllMusic	4/5 stars
Entertainment Weekly	B
Los Angeles Times	2/4 stars
RapReviews	7.5/10
The Source	3.5/5 stars
USA Today	2.5/4 stars

Music is the fourth solo studio album by American rapper Erick Sermon. It was released on October 30, 2001 via Def Squad Records and J Records, making it his debut album on the latter label. Production was handled entirely by Sermon, except for the song "It's Nuttin'", which was produced by Rockwilder. The album features guest appearances from Keith Murray, Redman, Cadillac Tah, Daytona, Khari, LL Cool J, Marvin Gaye, Olivia, Scarface and Sy Scott.

The album spawned two singles: "Music" and "I'm Hot". Its title track, "Music", which sampled vocals from Marvin Gaye and in terms of chart position is Sermon's most popular song, peaking at #22 on the Billboard Hot 100, along with inclusion on the soundtrack of the Martin Lawrence/Danny DeVito film What's the Worst That Could Happen?; the music video for the song featured scenes from the film intermixed with clips of Gaye performing in archived music videos and music programs.

The album reached number 33 on the Billboard 200 albums chart making it Sermon's second most popular solo album.

== Track listing ==
All music is composed by Erick Sermon, except for track 2 composed by Rockwilder.

No.	Title	Length
1.	"Rapture"	0:04
2.	"It's Nuttin'" (featuring Khari & Daytona)	3:12
3.	"Come Thru"	3:13
4.	"Music" (featuring Marvin Gaye)	3:43
5.	"Skit I"	1:05
6.	"Now Whut's Up" (featuring Redman, Keith Murray & Sy Scott)	3:39
7.	"I'm That Nigga"	3:11
8.	"Genius E Dub" (featuring Olivia)	3:37
9.	"Skit II"	1:43
10.	"Ain't No Future...2001"	4:11
11.	"Do-Re-Mi" (featuring LL Cool J & Scarface)	4:34
12.	"I'm Hot"	3:48
13.	"Up Them Thangs" (featuring Keith Murray & Cadillac Tah)	3:37
14.	"The Sermon"	3:04
15.	"Skit III"	1:49
16.	"Music (Remix)" (featuring Redman & Keith Murray)	3:36
Total length:		47:15

Sample credits

Come Thru

- "Freddie's Dead" by Curtis Mayfield

Music

- "I've Got My Music" (Original Vocal Version of "Turn On Some Music") from Midnight Love and the Sexual Healing Sessions by Marvin Gaye

I'm That Nigga

- "(Don't Worry) If There's a Hell Below, We're All Going to Go" by Curtis Mayfield

Genius E Dub

- "Genius of Love" by Tom Tom Club

Ain't No Future...2001

- "Ain't No Future in Yo' Frontin'" by MC Breed, "More Bounce to the Ounce" by Roger Troutman

I'm Hot

- "Sexual Healing" by Marvin Gaye, "Get Down" by Craig Mack

The Sermon

- "What I Feel/Issues" by R. Kelly

Music [Remix]

- "Turn On Some Music" by Marvin Gaye

== Chart history ==
Chart (2001)	Peak position
US Billboard 200	33
US Top R&B/Hip-Hop Albums (Billboard)	8
