= React (Erick Sermon song) =

Single by Erick Sermon featuring Redman

from the album React
- Released: December 9, 2002
- Recorded: 2002
- Genre: Hip hop
- Length: 3:37
- Label: J
- Songwriters: Erick Sermon, Reggie Noble
- Producer: Just Blaze

Erick Sermon singles chronology
"I'm Hot" (2001)	"React" (2002)	"Yeah Yeah U Know It" (2003)

Redman singles chronology
"Dirrty" (2002)	"React" (2002)	"Ride" (2003)

"React" is the lead single from Erick Sermon's fifth studio album of the same name. The song was produced by Just Blaze and featured Sermon's fellow Def Squad member Redman. The song appears on the soundtrack to the 2003 film, Honey, and in the 2003 video game, NBA Street Vol. 2.

"React" became Sermon's second and last top-40 hit, reaching No. 36 on the Billboard Hot 100.

The song's hook sampled Meena Kapoor's vocals on "Chandi Ka Badan" from the soundtrack for the Bollywood film Taj Mahal. The sample, attributed to "an Arabic chick" in the hook, translates to "If someone wants to commit suicide, what can you do?", to which Sermon responds "Whatever she said, then I'm that". The use of the sample drew criticism from the south-Asian community in New York.

== Track listing ==
No.	Title	Length
1.	"React (Radio Mix)"	3:45
2.	"React (Instrumental)"	3:44
3.	"React (Club Mix)"	3:45
4.	"React (Instrumental)"	3:44

== Charts ==
=== Weekly charts ===
Chart (2002–2003)	Peak position
Billboard Hot 100	36
Billboard Hot R&B/Hip-Hop Singles & Tracks	12
Billboard Hot Rap Singles	8
Billboard Rhythmic Top 40	28
UK Singles Chart	14

=== Year-end charts ===
Chart (2002)	Position
UK Urban (Music Week)	7
Billboard Hot R&B/Hip-Hop Singles & Tracks	98
