= Way 2 Fonky =

Studio album by DJ Quik
- Released: July 20, 1992
- Recorded: December 1991–April 1992
- Studio: Skip Saylor, Los Angeles, California
- Genre: West Coast hip-hop
- Length: 42:41
- Label: Profile
- Producer: DJ Quik

DJ Quik chronology
Quik Is the Name (1991)	Way 2 Fonky (1992)	Safe + Sound (1995)

Singles from Way 2 Fonky
- 1. "Jus Lyke Compton" Released: May 29, 1992; 2. "Way 2 Fonky" Released: August 28, 1992

Way 2 Fonky is the second studio album by American hip hop artist and producer DJ Quik, released by Profile Records on July 20, 1992. The recording sessions took place during 1991 and 1992. The album was produced by DJ Quik.

The album debuted at number ten on the US Billboard 200 chart on August 8, 1992, selling 120,000 copies in its first week in the United States. The album was certified Gold three months after its release on October 9, 1992, by the RIAA.

== Background ==
DJ Quik was beefing with rapper Tim Dog during this time who dissed him in two tracks "Step To Me", and "DJ Quick Beat Down (Skit)" on his 1991 debut album Penicillin on Wax. He responded to Tim Dog with disses on "Way 2 Fonky" and "Tha Last Word". He was also beefing with MC Eiht; the two had already been beefing for a few years at the time. Tim Dog responded to DJ Quik with "I Don't Give a Fuck" and "Breakin' North" (which is the same shout-out type song like "Tha Last Word") on his second album Do or Die.

== Singles ==
Two singles from the album were released; "Way 2 Fonky" a response to Tim Dog's West Coast diss "Fuck Compton", and "Jus Lyke Compton".

== Critical reception ==
Professional ratings
Review scores
Source	Rating
AllMusic	4/5 stars
Entertainment Weekly	B
Los Angeles Times	3.5/4 stars
RapReviews	8/10
The Source	link

Way 2 Fonky received generally positive reviews from music critics. Jonathan Gold of the Los Angeles Times wrote that "Way 2 Fonky" is a great-sounding rap record, with a giant, Jeep-worthy bottom and high, articulated, almost reggae-inflected rhyming. His lyrics celebrate the fun side of the mythical Compton experience where N.W.A.'s dwell on what could go wrong; his sleek, '70s-soul-style grooves, which he produces himself, swing, well . . . way fonky. And though he's easily as obscene as any of his peers, he seems actually to like women. Havelock Nelson of Entertainment Weekly wrote that Unlike those other rap quasars from Compton, N.W.A, DJ Quik doesn't just give us frightening images from Black Cali alleys. This near-platinum poet may involve himself in verbal gunplay and narrate a few violent street adventures, but on his sophomore set Quik is more concerned with getting paid and laid than with gang wars and bloodbaths. As he declares in "America'z Most Complete Artist," I don't go toe to toe, I go ho to ho. Quik's nasty, but he's no fool; he practices safe sex, 'cause HIV don't give a f--- about me. He's even willing to experiment musically and lyrically. Witness the sexually playful reggae track "Me Wanna Rip Your Girl," where he adopts a Jafakean (fake Jamaican) accent. On the album's other tracks, he throws his thin yet effective countrified voice against sampled grooves that for the most part bounce and shake like hard-core Jell-O. Ron Wynn of AllMusic wrote that DJ Quik proved his mettle with "Jus Lyke Compton", "a definitive bit of regional touting that proclaimed West Coast rap the style-setter and all others followers. Whether or not you bought the line, you were hooked by the rap. Nothing else on the disc matched this single's intensity and wit, but it helped him earn a second straight gold LP."

== Accolades ==
Chris Rock ranked Way 2 Fonky twenty-fourth on a 2005 list for Rolling Stone on the Top 25 Hip-Hop Albums of all time.

== Track listing ==
No.	Title	Writer(s)	Producer(s)	Length
1.	"America'z Most Complete Artist"	Andre Young; David Blake; George Clinton; Tracy Curry; Dunbar	DJ Quik	3:30
2.	"Mo' Pussy"	Blake; The Gap Band	DJ Quik	3:40
3.	"Way 2 Fonky"	Blake	DJ Quik; Rob "Fonksta" Bacon^{[c]}	3:20
4.	"Jus Lyke Compton"	Rob Bacon; Blake	DJ Quik; Rob "Fonksta" Bacon^{[c]}	4:10
5.	"Quik'z Groove II (For U 2 Rip 2)"	Blake	DJ Quik	2:32
6.	"Me Wanna Rip Ya Girl"	Blake	DJ Quik	4:37
7.	"When You're a Gee" (featuring Playa Hamm)	Blake; Milo; Strong; Norman Whitfield	DJ Quik	4:07
8.	"No Bullshit" (featuring K.K.)	Blake; Kai McDonald	DJ Quik	1:56
9.	"Only fo' tha Money" (featuring 2nd II None)	Darius Barnett; Blake; McDonald; Reeves; Russell Simmons; Smith; Spicer	DJ Quik	3:58
10.	"Let Me Rip Tonite"	Barnett; Blake; Bonner; Jones; McDonald; Middlebrooks; Morrison; Napier; Noland; Pierce; Webster	DJ Quik	4:16
11.	"Niggaz Still Trippin'" (featuring 2nd II None, AMG, Hi-C & JFN)	Barnett; Blake; Davis; Johnson; Jason Lewis; McClein; Najar; Peters; Phillips; Smith; Spri; Crawford Wilkerson	DJ Quik	4:07
12.	"Tha Last Word"	Blake	DJ Quik	2:28

- ^{^c} signifies an co producer.

Sample credits

- "America'z Most Complete Artist" contains samples of "N.T." by Kool & the Gang, "Remember the Children" by Earth, Wind & Fire, "The Big Bang Theory" performed by Parliament, and "No One Can Do It Better" by the D.O.C.
- "Mo' Pussy" contains samples of "Shake" and "I Don't Believe You Want to Get Up and Dance (Oops)" by the Gap Band.
- "Way 2 Fonky" contains a sample of "More Bounce to the Ounce" by Zapp.
- "Jus Lyke Compton" contains samples of "Hook and Sling" performed by Eddie Bo, and "Wino Dealing with Dracula" performed by Richard Pryor.
- "Quik'z Groove II [For U 2 Rip 2]" contains samples of "Africano" performed by Earth, Wind & Fire, and "Explain It to Her Mama" performed by Temprees.
- "When You're a Gee" contains samples of "I Heard It Through the Grapevine" performed by Roger Troutman, and "UFO" performed by Richard Pryor.
- "Niggaz Still Trippin'" contains samples of "Movin'" performed by Brass Construction, "Let's Dance" performed by Pleasure, "You Can Make It If You Try" performed by Sly & the Family Stone, and "Ffun" performed by Con Funk Shun.

== Personnel ==
Credits adapted from the Way 2 Fonky liner notes.

- 2nd II None - vocals (2, 8, 9)
- AMG - vocals (11)
- Robert Bacon - bass, freakboards, guitar, producer
- Courtney Branch - executive producer
- DJ Quik - arranger, engineer, executive producer, freakboards, mixing, producer
- Playa Hamm - vocals (7)
- Hi-C - vocals (11)
- JFN - vocals (11)
- Tracy Kendrick - executive producer
- Robert Lewis - photography
- Sexy Leroy - vocals (10)
- Louie Teran - engineer, mixing

== Charts ==
=== Weekly charts ===
Chart (1992)	Peak position
US Billboard 200	10
US Billboard Top R&B/Hip-Hop Albums	13

=== Year-end charts ===
Chart (1992)	Position
US Billboard Top R&B/Hip-Hop Albums	64

== Certifications ==
Region	Certification	Certified units/sales
United States (RIAA)	Gold	500,000^{^}
^{^} Shipments figures based on certification alone.
