= Dead Homiez =

1993 American film directed by Billy Wright

Dead Homiez DVD cover.

Dead Homiez is a 1993 direct-to-video drama film directed by Billy Wright. Filmed on location in South Central Los Angeles, the film stars Treyvon Green and Cynthia Berry.

Based on true events, the film features real ex-gang members and details the effect of a drive-by shooting on the community, from the families, to the friends and neighbors of the victims, and the perpetrators. It features live concert footage of the rappers Tupac Shakur and the Notorious B.I.G. near the end of the story.

== Plot ==
The film consists of the dramatization of an actual incident regarding the murder of Bloods gang member Darryl "Poo Bear" Young (director Billy Wright's cousin) who was murdered in a gang-related shooting in 1988. The dramatization is interspersed with commentary from members of several Los Angeles street gangs including The Athens Park Bloods, The Gardena Payback Crips, The Campanella Park Pirus (Who are different from the bloods), and the Grape Street Watts Crips.

== Synopsis ==
In 1988, a 19-year-old man named Devonte Jones is murdered one evening at a gas station in South Central Los Angeles, shot to death by unknown assailants as he gets out of his car. When the LAPD homicide detectives arrive at the scene they learn that Devonte is a member of the East Coast Crips street gang and went by the street moniker "'Lil Cartoon". From the eyewitness accounts of the shooting the detectives surmise that Devonte was the intended target of the shooters.

While the detectives conduct their investigation a car pulls up with several members of the East Coast Crips. One of the Crips, Devonte's best friend Cartoon (Treyvon Green), approaches the crime scene and becomes enraged at the finding of his namesake dead in the gas station lot. After being restrained by the police Cartoon and the Crips leave the scene.

Days later, at Lil Cartoon's funeral, the Crips are mourning and listening to the pastor's eulogy while outside a teenage member of the Mad Swan Bloods, a gang located in the same neighborhood as the church, notices the Crip funeral while walking down an alley across the street from the church. The young Blood leaves and returns to the area with two more Bloods, who then summon other Bloods driving by. The church deacon peeks outside a window and notices the Bloods congregating in the alley but, after thinking about it, decides against informing anyone about it in order to avoid an inevitable conflict.

Meanwhile, the Bloods in the alley drive to a nearby basketball court and inform their fellow gang members about the "E-Rickets" (a disrespectful term for East Coast Crips) funeral nearby. Just as the gang members pile into a lowrider to drive off another car with two women pulls up. One of the women asks for "Poo Bear" and a Blood points to his friend, 17-year-old Darryl "Poo Bear" Young (Shannon Luckey), who is playing basketball on the court.

The women in the car are Poo Bear's mother and sister who arrive to deliver a letter to Poo Bear from his younger brother Alton, who goes by the street name "Solo". Solo is doing time in The California Youth Authority for an unspecified crime. After asking Poo Bear for money, the women warn him to be careful because there have been a lot of murders recently. Poo Bear dismisses their warning as "Old jinxy shit" and returns to the basketball court.

As the Crip funeral continues several carloads of Bloods pull up into the alley across the street from the church, blasting loud rap music to announce their presence, and file out of the cars and into the street. One of the Crips attending the funeral looks outside of a church window and sees the gang of Bloods and promptly notifies his friends who all begin going to the windows, despite the pastors' hollow assurance that there's nothing to worry about.

Despite the pastor's plea for the young men not to go outside the Crips run out of the church and into the street to confront the Bloods who are disrespecting the funeral. After hurling taunts and insults at one another a Blood member throws a bottle of malt liquor at the Crips and a gang brawl erupts in the street which is broken up when the police arrive.

While the brawl is taking place Poo Bear is at the basketball court reading the letter from Solo, who states that he hates Youth Authority and intends to return to school and leave gang-banging alone once he's released. After the brawl two members of the Bloods are riding in a car when they come across Poo Bear driving towards them in his lowrider. The Bloods inform Poo Bear and B-Fool, who is riding in the car with Poo Bear, about the brawl with the Crips as Poo Bear was unaware that this was the reason why the Bloods left the basketball court earlier that day.

Poo Bear then drives to his girlfriend, Tuffie's house. Tuffie is immediately upset at seeing Poo Bear drive up with B-Fool, a shady Bloods gang member who has a reputation among their set for being "scandalous". Poo Bear brushes off Tuffies' concern and shows her the letter he received from Solo. As Tuffie begins to read the letter Poo Bear receives a beep from his pager. Tuffie immediately suspects that the page is from another girl despite Poo Bear's assurance that it's a drug addict paging him to cop a fix.

Tuffie tricks Poo Bear and steals his pager, promptly calling the number and confronting the girl on the other line. Poo Bear immediately hangs up the phone which upsets Tuffie. As Poo Bear leaves the house Tuffie asks him where he's going and he tells her that he's going to make some money, apparently by selling crack cocaine, and that he'll be back and for her to stay in the house.

Later in the day as Poo Bear and B-Fool walk out of an apartment they are approached by a clean cut, seemingly harmless man walking up the alley next to the apartment building. The man asks Poo Bear if he's selling "bud" (marijuana). Poo Bear rudely rebuffs the man, who simply says "Alright" and turns to walk away. It turns out that the clean cut man is Poo Bear's rival Cartoon, the Crip whose best friend was murdered at the gas station at the beginning of the film.

Because of his neat appearance Poo Bear and B-Fool don't recognize him as a rival gang member. Seconds after walking away Cartoon turns around, draws a Glock pistol and opens fire on Poo Bear and B-Fool who attempt to flee back into the apartment. While B-Fool makes it to the apartment door Poo Bear is shot twice in his back. As Poo Bear staggers towards the apartment door B-Fool closes the security door behind himself, leaving Poo Bear outside and defenseless.

As Poo Bear struggles to make it into the apartment Cartoon shoots him a third time and Poo Bear collapses in front of the apartment door. Cartoon stands over Poo Bear and fires another six shots (a total of nine rounds altogether) into him before running back down the alley into an awaiting car and drives off.

As Poo Bear's life flashes before his eyes he remembers the warning that his mother and sister gave him earlier in the day. He has a flashback about being informed of the gang brawl earlier that day, obviously realizing that he was shot in retaliation for Lil Cartoon's murder and for the Bloods subsequent disrespect of Lil Cartoon's funeral. He also has a flashback of his girlfriend Tuffie warning him about B-Fool's scandalous disposition.

A woman inside the apartment yells at B-Fool to go outside and help Poo-Bear. Just as B-Fool comes out of the apartment a carload of Bloods, apparently hearing the gunshots nearby, pull up and find Poo Bear mortally wounded in front of the apartment. One of the Bloods vomits after seeing Poo Bear's bullet-riddled body.

Another Blood immediately begins to question B-Fool who, living up to his shady reputation, lies and claims that he just arrived and didn't know what happened to Poo Bear (obviously not wanting them to know that he closed the door on Poo Bear, which allowed Cartoon to continue shooting him). The Blood who questions B-Fool is suspicious of him and they put Poo Bear into their car and rush him to the hospital.

At the hospital several Bloods stand around somber as Poo Bear's mother and sister arrive at the hospital where a doctor immediately informs them that Poo Bear has died from his wounds. When the Bloods standing in the hallway see Poo Bear's mother and sister grieving in the next room they realize he's dead. Tuffie is shown grieving in her bedroom while looking at a video of her and Poo Bear dancing around in her front yard.

Solo is released from Youth Authority on a 12-hour furlough to attend his brother's funeral with instructions to be returned to the facility by 8:00 PM. At the funeral a guest pastor speaks to the mourners. He addresses his message specifically to the Bloods in attendance. The guest pastor informs the Bloods that he's an ex-convict and talks about what his self-destructive lifestyle has cost him: his ten-year-old son. He invites the Bloods to give their lives to God and renounce gang banging.

After some initial hesitation several Bloods walk up to the altar. After burying Poo Bear the Bloods and Poo Bear's family return to his mother's house for a cookout. At the cookout B-Fool instigates a retaliation against the Crips, specifically goading Solo to seek revenge for his brother's murder. B-Fool and the Bloods peer-pressure Solo, threatening to "fuck him up" every time they see him if he doesn't retaliate. As the Bloods plan their retaliation Tuffie attacks another young woman at the cookout who she suspects was fooling around with Poo Bear and was the woman who paged him on the day he was murdered.

Later that night B-Fool and Solo, along with a Blood named Moon and the Blood who informed Poo Bear of the gang brawl, steal a Chevy Nova and prepare to ride out for a retaliatory shooting. Just as they are about to leave Solo's mother drives up and begs Solo not to retaliate, threatening to fight him if he leaves with the Bloods. She warns Solo that they won't find Poo Bear's killer, just as Poo Bear wasn't Lil Cartoon's killer. Solo relents and walks with his mother to her car.

Just as he's about to get in the car he runs back to the stolen Nova and drives off with the Bloods. The carload of Bloods drive through the streets of South Central L.A. looking for their rivals. After taking off their red bandannas when a patrol car pulls up alongside them the Bloods continue driving and spot two men standing in front of a house talking. Although they can't see their faces the Bloods make the men out as Crips based on their attire: blue khaki pants and blue flannel pendleton shirts.

B-Fool and Solo get out of the car, walk up to the men and open fire on them killing one man and wounding the other in his arm as he runs away. A young woman inside of the house is talking to a friend on the phone when she hears the gunshots. She runs outside and sees the dead man, her boyfriend, laying in the front yard. She turns him over and, to her horror, finds her dead fourteen-month-old son underneath him. It turns out the man was holding his child when B-Fool and Solo began shooting (the bullet going through both of them) and they never saw the baby. The young woman and her family grieve in the front yard of their house as the police arrive.

A postscript states that Moon continued to drive the stolen car after the shooting and was pulled over two days later by police and arrested for the double murder of the man and his son. Moon turned state's evidence and as a result he, Solo and B-Fool were sentenced to twenty-five years to life in prison. The film ends with a shot of the funeral program of the real-life Poo Bear. The director dedicates the film to Jake "Big Jake" Robles, a Campanella Park Piru and G-Twin, a member of the Athens Park Bloods who both participated in the movie.

Robles, a personal friend and bodyguard of Death Row Records CEO Suge Knight, was murdered in Atlanta, GA on September 24, 1995, after a fight outside of a birthday party being thrown by record producer Jermaine Dupri. G-Twin, the twin son of one of the founders of the Athens Park Bloods, was shot to death while riding a bicycle through a Crip neighborhood in Compton, CA. His murder was featured in the documentary "Bastards of the Party" directed by fellow Athens Park Blood gang member Cle "Bone" Sloane.

== See also ==
- List of hood films
- List of drama films
