= E.S.P. (Erick Sermon's Perception) =

2015 album by Erick Sermon

Studio album by Erick Sermon
- Released: September 25, 2015
- Genre: Hip hop
- Length: 43:58
- Label: Def Squad; Caroline
- Producer: Richie "Red" Hayes (exec.); Erick Sermon (exec.)

Erick Sermon chronology
Chilltown, New York (2004)	E.S.P. (Erick Sermon's Perception) (2015)	Vernia (2019)

E.S.P. (Erick Sermon's Perception) is the seventh solo studio album by American rapper and producer Erick Sermon. It was released on September 25, 2015 via Def Squad/Caroline Records.

== Track listing ==
No.	Title	Length
1.	"The Sermon"	2:11
2.	"Daydreamer" (featuring Too $hort & The Voice)	3:07
3.	"Angry" (featuring The Voice)	2:57
4.	"Lyrics"	0:13
5.	"Make Room" (featuring Sheek Louch & Joell Ortiz)	3:46
6.	"Serious" (featuring Syleena Johnson)	3:59
7.	"One Shot" (featuring Masspike Miles)	3:14
8.	"Jokes" (Skit)	0:34
9.	"Clutch" (featuring Method Man & Redman)	3:47
10.	"With You" (featuring Faith Evans)	3:57
11.	"Culture" (featuring Fish Grease)	4:13
12.	"Still Getting It" (featuring Krayzie Bone)	3:52
13.	"Neva Take" (featuring Keith Murray & Fred Da Godson)	4:55
14.	"Jack Move" (featuring Jarren Benton)	2:23
15.	"Impostors"	0:50
Total length:		43:58

Sample credits

- "The Sermon" contains elements from "New Beginning" by Dexter Wansel
- "Daydreamer" contains elements from "You're a Customer" by EPMD
- "Angry" contains elements from "The Cuckoo" by Tom Rush
- "Make Room" contains elements from "It's All About the Benjamins" by Puff Daddy, Lil' Kim, The Lox & Notorious B.I.G.
- "Serious" contains elements from "Sunny Monday" by Booker T. & the M.G.'s, "Takeover" by Jay-Z, and "I'm Gon' Cry" by Syleena Johnson
- "Culture" contains elements from "Soulstar" by Musiq Soulchild, "How High" and "Part II" by Method Man & Redman
- "Still Getting It" contains elements from "It's Funky Enough" by The D.O.C.
- "Jack Move" contains elements from "Cramp Your Style" by All the People & Robert Moore, "Fantastic Freaks at the Dixie" by Grandwizard Theodore & the Fantastic Five, and "Charlie Murphy vs. Rick James (Part 2)" from Chappelle's Show

== Chart history ==
Chart (2015)	Peak position
US Top R&B/Hip-Hop Albums (Billboard)	41
