= Get da Money =

2000 single by Ja Rule and Erick Sermon

"Get Da Money"

Single by Erick Onasis feat. Ja Rule

from the album Def Squad Presents Erick Onasis
- Released: 2000
- Recorded: 1999
- Genre: Hip hop, East Coast hip hop
- Length: 3:37
- Label: DreamWorks
- Songwriters: Atkins, Sermon
- Producer: Erick Sermon

Erick Onasis singles chronology
"Focus" (2000)	"Get Da Money" (2000)	"Why Not" (2000)

Ja Rule singles chronology
"You Are Everything (Remix)" (1999)	"Get Da Money" (2000)	"Between Me and You" (2000)

"Get Da Money" is a song by American hip hop artist Erick Sermon (released under the moniker Erick Onasis) recorded for his third album Def Squad Presents Erick Onasis (2000). The song, which features fellow hip hop artist Ja Rule, was released as the second single for the album in 2000.

== Track listing ==
12", Vinyl

1. "Get Da Money" (Main Pass) - 3:37
2. "Get Da Money" (Clean) - 3:37
3. "Get Da Money" (Instrumental) - 3:37
4. "Get Da Money" (A Capella) - 3:37

== Chart performance ==
Chart (2000)	Peak position
U.S. Hot Rap Singles	48
