= If You Want It (2nd II None song) =

Single by 2nd II None

from the album 2nd II None
- Released: 1992
- Recorded: 1991
- Genre: Hip hop
- Length: 3:45
- Label: Profile
- Songwriters: Deon Barnett, David Blake, Kelton McDonald
- Producer: DJ Quik

2nd II None singles chronology
"Let the Rhythm Take You" (1991)	"If You Want" (1992)	"Didn't Mean To Turn You On" (1994)

"If You Want It" is the third and final single released off 2nd II None's debut self-titled studio album, 2nd II None. The song is produced by DJ Quik and samples Isaac Hayes's Hung Up on My Baby.

== Track listings ==
CD single

1. "If You Want It (Radio Version)" – 3:28
2. "If You Want It (Remix)" – 3:48

Vinyl, 12", 33 ⅓ RPM, Promo

1. "If You Want It (Album Version)" – 3:46
2. "If You Want It (Remix)" – 3:48
3. "More Than a Player" – 3:16
4. "If You Want It (Radio Version)" – 3:28
5. "If You Want It (Instrumental)" – 3:44

== Chart performance ==
Chart (1992)	Peak position
US Billboard Hot 100	64
US Billboard Hot R&B/Hip-Hop Songs	33
US Billboard Rap Songs	13
