= Vernia (album) =

2019 album by Erick Sermon

Studio album by Erick Sermon
- Released: April 19, 2019
- Genre: Hip hop, East Coast hip hop
- Length: 44:11
- Label: Def Squad
- Producer: Erick Sermon; Rockwilder; Boogeyman; DJ Battle Cat; Kanzer; Mic Cheks; Ty Fyffe; Apathy

Erick Sermon chronology
E.S.P. (Erick Sermon's Perception) (2015)	Vernia (2019)

Vernia is the eighth solo studio album by American rapper and record producer Erick Sermon. It was released on April 19, 2019 via Def Squad Records. Together with Sermon, production was handled by eight record producers, including DJ Battlecat, Rockwilder and Ty Fyffe. The album features guest appearances from AZ, Big K.R.I.T., David Banner, Da YoungFellaz, Devin the Dude, Kaelyn Kastle, Keith Murray, Nature, No Malice, N.O.R.E., Raekwon, Ricco Barrino, RJ Payne, Styles P, Shaquille O'Neal, Too $hort, TryBishop, Xzibit, and Yummy.The song "300 E" was mixed by female producer Masaniai Muhammad Ali.

On April 16, 2019, Sermon released a Boogeyman-produced song "My Style".

== Track listing ==
This track listing has been adapted from iTunes.

No.	Title	Producer(s)	Length
1.	"Payne Intro" (featuring RJ Payne)	Kanzer	2:29
2.	"Wake Up/No Fear"	Erick Sermon	2:54
3.	"Da Wave" (featuring Yummy & Da YoungFellaz)	Rockwilder	3:05
4.	"Tha Game" (featuring AZ & Styles P)	Mic Cheks; Erick Sermon	3:48
5.	"Go" (featuring No Malice, TryBishop & Kaelyn Kastle)	Erick Sermon	3:36
6.	"My Style" (featuring Raekwon & N.O.R.E.)	Boogeyman	3:35
7.	"That Girl" (featuring Big K.R.I.T. & Ricco Barrino)	Erick Sermon	3:53
8.	"Cabinet"	Erick Sermon	2:33
9.	"Stay Real Part 2" (featuring Nature & Keith Murray)	Erick Sermon	2:57
10.	"Zion" (featuring Xzibit, David Banner & Shaquille O'Neal)	Ty Fyffe	3:45
11.	"May Sound Crazy" (featuring Too $hort & Devin the Dude)	DJ Battlecat	3:40
12.	"300 E" (featuring Kami Marsden)	Rockwilder	4:26
13.	"Vernia"	Apathy	4:24
