= React (Erick Sermon album) =

Studio album by Erick Sermon
- Released: November 19, 2002
- Recorded: 2001–2002
- Studio: L.I.T.E. Studios (Long Island, NY)
- Genre: Hip hop
- Length: 46:21
- Label: Def Squad; J
- Producer: Erick Sermon (also exec.); Just Blaze; Andre Ramseur; Kaos; Megahertz; Rick Rock

Erick Sermon chronology
Music (2001)	React (2002)	Chilltown, New York (2004)

Singles from React
- 1. "React" Released: October 1, 2002; 2. "Love Iz" Released: December 31, 2002

Professional ratings
Review scores
Source	Rating
AllMusic	3/5 stars
Blender	3/5 stars
RapReviews	7.5/10

React is the fifth solo studio album by American rapper and producer Erick Sermon. It was released on November 19, 2002 via Def Squad Records and J Records, making it his second and final album for the latter label. Recording sessions took place at L.I.T.E. Recording Studios in Long Island, New York. Production was handled primarily by Sermon, except for several tracks, which were produced by Just Blaze, Andre Ramseur, Kaos, Megahertz and Rick Rock. The album features guest appearances from Free Marie, Icarus, Keith Murray, Khari, Lyric, MC Lyte, Rah Digga, Red Café, Redman, Sy Scott and Gregory Howard.

The album spawned two singles: "React", which made it to #36 on the Billboard Hot 100, and "Love Iz". React peaked at number 72 on the Billboard 200 albums chart in the United States.

== Track listing ==
No.	Title	Producer(s)	Length
1.	"Intro"	Erick Sermon	0:40
2.	"Here I Iz"	Erick Sermon	2:01
3.	"We Don't Care" (featuring Free)	Just Blaze	3:40
4.	"Party Right"	Erick Sermon	3:00
5.	"React" (featuring Redman)	Just Blaze	3:38
6.	"Skit I"	Erick Sermon	0:57
7.	"To tha Girlz"	Megahertz	3:33
8.	"Love Iz" (featuring Gregory Howard)	Erick Sermon	3:46
9.	"Go Wit Me"	Erick Sermon; Andre Ramseur	4:16
10.	"Skit II"	Erick Sermon	1:23
11.	"Hold Up Dub" (featuring Keith Murray)	Rick Rock	3:12
12.	"Tell Me" (featuring MC Lyte & Rah Digga)	Erick Sermon	3:03
13.	"Skit III"	Erick Sermon	1:01
14.	"S.O.D." (featuring Icarus, Red Café & Sy Scott)	Kaos; Erick Sermon (co.)	4:11
15.	"Hip Hop Radio"	Erick Sermon	3:38
16.	"Skit IV (Khari)" (featuring Khari)	Erick Sermon	0:53
17.	"Don't Give Up" (featuring Lyric)	Erick Sermon	3:38
Total length:			46:21

Sample credits

Love Iz

- "Love and Happiness" by Al Green
- "King of Rock" by Run-DMC
- "La Di Da Di" by Slick Rick

Hold Up Dub

- "No Sleep till Brooklyn" by Beastie Boys
- "Let Me Clear My Throat" by Kool & the Gang
- "Shut 'Em Down" by Public Enemy

Hip Hop Radio

- "Angie Baby" by Helen Reddy, written by Alan O'Day

Don't Give Up

- "Inside Out" by Odyssey, written by Jesse Rae

React

- "Chandi Ka Badan" by Meena Kapoor, written by Sahir Ludhianvi

== Chart history ==
Chart (2002)	Peak position
US Billboard 200	72
US Top R&B/Hip-Hop Albums (Billboard)	13
