= Born and Raised in Compton =

"Born & Raised In Compton"

Single by DJ Quik

from the album Quik Is the Name
- Released: January 15, 1991
- Genre: West Coast hip-hop
- Length: 3:25
- Label: Profile
- Songwriter: David Blake
- Producer: DJ Quik

DJ Quik singles chronology
"Born & Raised In Compton" (1991)	"Tonite" (1991)

Music video
- "Born and Raised in Compton" on YouTube

"Born & Raised In Compton" is the debut single by American rapper and producer DJ Quik, released as the first official single from his debut major-label studio album, Quik Is the Name. The track was written and produced by DJ Quik himself. The song features samples from "Hyperbolicsyllabicsesquedalymistic" by Isaac Hayes, "Hardcore Jollies" by Funkadelic, "She's Not Just Another Woman" by 8th Day, and "Compton's N the House" by N.W.A. The song was released as a single on January 15, 1991.

The song debuted and peaked at number 16 on the Billboard Hot R&B/Hip-Hop Songs, becoming DJ Quik's second-highest charting song behind "Tonite".

== Track listing ==
- CD Single
1. "Born and Raised in Compton" – 3:25

== Charts ==
It debuted at number 16 on June 1, 1991 on the Billboard Hot R&B/Hip-Hop Songs and spent 14 weeks on the chart.

Chart (1991)	Peak position
US R&B/Hip-Hop Songs	16
