= Nobody (DJ Quik song) =

Single by DJ Quik featuring Suga Free

from the album The Book of David
- Released: April 19, 2011
- Recorded: 2010
- Genre: Hip hop
- Length: 3:37
- Label: Mad Science; Fontana
- Songwriters: David Blake; Dejuan Walker
- Producer: DJ Quik

DJ Quik singles chronology
"Real Women" (2011)	"Nobody" (2011)

"Nobody" is a single by American hip-hop artist DJ Quik from his eighth album The Book of David. The song features longtime collaborator Suga Free, with Ty$ appearing in the music video.

== Background ==
The snippet of the track featuring only Suga Free's verse was released on March 15, 2010. DJ Quik premiered the full and final version of the song during a radio interview with KIIS-FM in late April. Once the song was premiered DJ Quik was asked what was it like working with Suga Free again and replied "What it was like working with Suga Free again from the time we first started really never changed, just sometimes people can get involved and make things difficult. It's always the side people with their opinions and their habits, they kind of make recording not so fun sometimes. And I'm guilty too cause I had a few people on my side with opinions too, but now we're in the studio and its just us. We're both in the studio and we can both work and write. It's like fluid now. It's real simple".
