= Way 2 Fonky (song) =

1992 single by DJ Quik

Single by DJ Quik

from the album Way 2 Fonky
- Released: August 28, 1992
- Recorded: 1992
- Genre: West Coast hip hop; gangsta rap
- Length: 3:20
- Label: Profile
- Songwriter: David Blake
- Producers: DJ Quik; Rob "Fonksta" Bacon (co.)

DJ Quik singles chronology
"Jus Lyke Compton" (1992)	"Way 2 Fonky" (1992)	"Hand In Hand" (1998)

Music video
- "Way 2 Fonky" on YouTube

"Way 2 Fonky" is the second single released off DJ Quik's second studio album, Way 2 Fonky.

== Background and release ==
On the song, Quik takes time to address issues with MC Eiht and Bronx-based rapper, Tim Dog, who had released a song called "Fuck Compton". He claimed that he was growing tired of the increasing popularity of West Coast music that was causing him and other East Coast acts to be overlooked by record labels and publications alike. The song contains samples of "More Bounce to the Ounce" by Zapp and "Falstaff" by The Watts Prophets. Tim Dog responded with "I Don't Give a Fuck" and "Breakin North" off his second album Do or Die. MC Eiht and Compton's Most Wanted responded with "Def Wish II", "Duck Sick II" and "Dead Men Tell No Lies" on their third album Music to Driveby.

== Music video ==
The video featured Quik dressed in all black, surrounded by his homies in a dark warehouse setting that becomes illuminated by random flashes of light.

== Track listings ==
CD single

1. "Way 2 Fonky" – 3:18

Vinyl, 12", Promo

1. "Way 2 Fonky" (Album Version) – 3:20
2. "Way 2 Fonky" (Radio Version) – 3:20
3. "Way 2 Fonky" (Instrumental) – 3:18
4. "Way 2 Fonky" (Acapella) – 0:50
5. "Mo' Pussy" (Album Version) – 3:40
6. "Mo' Pussy" (Instrumental) – 3:38

== Chart performance ==
Chart (1992)	Peak Position
US Hot R&B/Hip-Hop Songs (Billboard)	93
