= The Hi-Life Hustle =

Studio album by Hi-C
- Released: October 21, 2003
- Genre: West Coast hip hop
- Length: 1:03:27
- Label: Rap-A-Lot
- Producer: J. Prince (exec.); Crawfdog (also exec.); DJ Quik; Rob "Fonksta" Bacon

Hi-C chronology
Swing'n (1993)	The Hi-Life Hustle (2003)

Professional ratings
Review scores
Source	Rating
RapReviews	7/10 stars

The Hi-Life Hustle is the third studio album by American rapper Hi-C from Compton, California. It was released on October 21, 2003, via Rap-A-Lot Records. The album features guest appearances from DJ Quik, Bigg Steele, E-40, Nate Dogg, Too Swift, Suga Free, Diamonique, Sly Boogy, James DeBarge, and Pryncezz.

== Track listing ==
No.	Title	Producer(s)	Length
1.	"Hi Life" (Intro)		0:41
2.	"Say Woop" (featuring Suga Free)	Crawf Dog	4:01
3.	"I Don't Wanna Know" (featuring Nate Dogg)	Crawf Dog; Robert "Fonksta" Bacon	4:26
4.	"Talk" (featuring E-40 & Sly Boogie)	Crawf Dog	4:13
5.	"Coochie" (Intro)		0:31
6.	"Coochie Coochie" (featuring DJ Quik & Diamonique)	Crawf Dog	3:57
7.	"Let Me Know" (featuring DJ Quik & Fieldy)	DJ Quik	4:05
8.	"Pop It" (featuring Bigg Steele & Pryncezz)	Crawf Dog	3:24
9.	"Hey Hey" (featuring Bigg Steele & Pryncezz)	Crawf Dog	3:33
10.	"Big Girls Need Love Too"	Crawf Dog	4:09
11.	"Stalker"		0:42
12.	"Fo a Buck"	Crawf Dog	4:56
13.	"So Good" (featuring James DeBarge)	Crawf Dog	4:14
14.	"Hit Me Where It Hurts"	DJ Quik	3:52
15.	"Run Up, Done Up" (featuring Swift)	DJ Quik	4:02
16.	"X Pills"	Crawf Dog	4:26
17.	"Do It"	DJ Quik	8:15
Total length:			1:03:27

Sample credits

- Track 2 contains elements from "Funkin' for Fun" by Parliament (1976)
- Track 4 contains elements from "Easin' In" by Edwin Starr (1974)
- Track 6 contains elements from "Give Me Some of That Good Old Love" by Willie Hutch (1974)
- Track 7 contains elements from "So Ruff, So Tuff" by Roger Troutman (1981) and "All Bout U" by 2Pac (1996)
- Track 8 contains elements from "Mo' Pussy" by DJ Quik (1992)
- Track 10 contains elements from "You're Getting a Little Too Smart" by The Detroit Emeralds (1973)
- Track 17 contains elements from "Do It Roger" by Roger Troutman (1981) and "Wino & Junkie" by Richard Pryor (1974)
