= Chilltown, New York =

Studio album by Erick Sermon
- Released: June 22, 2004
- Recorded: 2003–04
- Studios: L.I.T.E. Studios (Long Island, NY)
- Genre: Hip hop
- Length: 52:23
- Labels: Def Squad; Universal; Universal Motown
- Producers: Kedar Massenburg (exec.); Erick Sermon (also exec.)

Erick Sermon chronology
React (2002)	Chilltown, New York (2004)	E.S.P. (Erick Sermon's Perception) (2015)

Singles from Chilltown, New York
- 1. "Relentless/I'm Not Him" Released: February 17, 2004; 2. "Feel It" Released: March 23, 2004

Chilltown, New York is the sixth solo studio album by American rapper and producer Erick Sermon. It was released on June 22, 2004 via Def Squad/Universal/Universal Motown Records Group. Recording sessions took place at L.I.T.E. Recording Studios in Long Island, New York. Production was handled solely by Sermon. The album features guest appearances from Sy Scott, Redman, 11/29, Dahlia Anderson, Keith Murray, Khari, Slimkid3, Talib Kweli and Whip Montez. The album spawned two singles: "Relentless"/"I'm Not Him" and "Feel It".

The album peaked at number 61 on the Billboard 200 albums chart in the United States.

== Critical reception ==
Professional ratings
Aggregate scores
Source	Rating
Metacritic	74/100
Review scores
Source	Rating
AllMusic	3/5 stars
HipHopDX	3/5
Pitchfork	7.4/10
RapReviews	8/10

Chilltown, New York received generally positive reviews from critics. At Metacritic, which assigns a normalized rating out of 100 to reviews from mainstream publications, the album received an average score of 74, based on 8 reviews. Lee Henderson of PopMatters stated, "As strong as anything Sermon's done". Steve Juon of RapReviews praised the album saying, "Chilltown, New York proves itself a worthy successor not only to 2002's React but to the rest of Sermon's long and storied rap career". Jamin Warren of Pitchfork said, "No doubt, Chilltown consistently delivers solid hip-hop cuts. But in comparison to his 2002 release React, Sermon's well of creativity might be running dry". AllMusic reviewer Andy Kellman said, "Chilltown won't be thought of as a classic down the line, but it hardly weakens the MC/producer's reputation".

== Track listing ==
All music is composed by Erick Sermon.

No.	Title	Writer(s)	Length
1.	"Home" (Intro)	E. Sermon; M. Berto	3:26
2.	"Wit Ee's"	E. Sermon	3:13
3.	"Relentless"	E. Sermon; D. Ingle; E. Brann	3:20
4.	"Jackin' For Rhymes" (Skit)	E. Sermon	1:23
5.	"Street Hop" (featuring Redman & Tre)	E. Sermon; R. Noble; N. Jones; S. Remi; J. Lordan; D. Anderson; T. Ruff	3:47
6.	"Chillin'" (featuring Talib Kweli & Whip Montez)	E. Sermon; T. Greene; W. Almonte; K. Robinson; C. Ridenhour; E. Sadler; H. Boxley; G. Clinton Jr.	3:30
7.	"Like Me" (featuring Sy Scott & Khari)	E. Sermon; K. Santiago; S. Scott; T. Shaw	3:02
8.	"Matrix" (Skit)	E. Sermon	0:54
9.	"God Sent"	E. Sermon	3:05
10.	"I'm Not Him"	E. Sermon; C. Ridenhour; E. Sadler; H. Boxley; G. Clinton Jr.	3:41
11.	"MC One Bar" (Skit)	E. Sermon	1:35
12.	"Feel It" (featuring Sy Scott)	E. Sermon; S. Scott; S. Henriques; D. McDaniels; J. Simmons; A. Kelly	3:40
13.	"Future Thug" (featuring Redman & 11/29)	E. Sermon; R. Noble; E. Willensky; A. Johnson	3:41
14.	"Do You Know" (featuring Dahlia Anderson)	E. Sermon; D. Anderson; G. Goffin; M. Masser	3:52
15.	"Listen" (featuring Sy Scott & Keith Murray)	E. Sermon; K. Murray; S. Scott	3:32
16.	"Hip Hop" (Skit)	E. Sermon	0:22
17.	"Can U Hear Me Now"	E. Sermon; K. Walker	3:54
Total length:			52:23

Sample credits

Relentless

- "Real Fright" by Iron Butterfly

Street Hop

- "Made You Look" by Nas

Chillin'

- "Top Billin'" by Audio Two
- "Bring the Noise" by Public Enemy

I'm Not Him

- "Bring the Noise" by Public Enemy

Feel It

- "Like Glue" by Sean Paul
- "Here We Go (Live)" by Run-DMC

Do You Know

- Contains an interpolation of "Theme from Mahogany" by Diana Ross

Can U Hear Me Now

- "AJ Scratch" by Kurtis Blow
- "Bring the Noise" by Public Enemy

== Chart history ==
Chart (2004)	Peak position
US Billboard 200	61
US Top R&B/Hip-Hop Albums (Billboard)	16
US Top Rap Albums (Billboard)	9
