= Quik Is the Name =

Studio album by DJ Quik
- Released: January 15, 1991
- Recorded: 1990
- Studio: Westlake (Los Angeles)
- Genres: West Coast hip-hop; gangsta rap; G-funk
- Length: 43:21
- Label: Profile
- Producers: Courtney Branch (also exec.); DJ Quik; Greg Jessie (exec.); Tracy Kendrick (also exec.)

DJ Quik chronology
Quik Is the Name (1991)	Way 2 Fonky (1992)

Singles from Quik Is the Name
- 1. "Born and Raised in Compton" Released: January 15, 1991; 2. "Tonite" Released: June 10, 1991; 3. "Quik Is the Name" Released: November 11, 1991

Quik Is the Name is the debut studio album by American hip hop artist and producer DJ Quik, released by Profile Records on January 15, 1991. The album was produced by DJ Quik and his executive producers Courtney Branch and Tracy Kendrick. The recording sessions took place in 1990 at Westlake Recording Studios in Los Angeles, California, with a production budget of $30,000.

The album debuted and peaked at No. 29 on the US Billboard 200 chart, selling over 50,000 copies in its first week in America. The album was certified Gold four months after its release on May 30, 1991, and Platinum four years later on July 26, 1995. As of 2005, the album has sold over 1,068,203 copies in United States.

== Background ==
DJ Quik was signed by Profile Records in the summer of 1990, after they heard his demo mixtape The Red Tape. He was the most expensive signee that Profile had ever acquired and was also the first artist to have received a six-figure deal on the label. Quik revealed to Vibe that "Quik Is the Name was originally supposed to be a mixtape that I was going to sell in the 'hood. I recorded it on a Tascam four-track. I did all the over-dubs, all the blending, and mixed it down on one of those Maxell metal tapes they used to sell. But along comes Dave from Profile Records looking for me like, 'Hey dude, I heard your cassette, man. Come sign with us.' [laughs] There was a bidding war between Fred Munao at Select Records and Cory Robbins and Profile. Cory ultimately ended up beating Fred out and I signed with Profile."

== Recording ==
You're taking this from the man that wrote the synthesizer part to the song that I did released and fucking in 1991, called "Tonite", that's him!

— Blake, David (April 5, 2010). "DJ Quik X EatUmUP Video X The Gooneez". RICHWORLD TV (Interview). Interviewed by The Real Richie Rich. Los Angeles. Archived from the original on March 10, 2016.

In an interview, Quik revealed that Profile Records gave him a $30,000 budget to mix the record over. He said: "If you do the math: a $1000 a-day studio ... if we get Quik Is the Name done in less than a month, that's more money in my pocket. So we got it done in 17 days. We dumped everything out of the SP-1200, brought the turntables into the studio, scratched all the hooks, did all the overdubs and brought in a bass guitar player to fatten up the sound because we would lose a lot of the bass from sampling. We recorded some of the album at Westlake Recording Studios in Santa Monica, which is where Michael Jackson did Thriller. It was a trip being in there mixing 'Tonite' on those big boards knowing that Michael was coming in and out of there". The "Tonite" synth was programmed by LA Dream Team's former member and producer, the Real Richie Rich.

== Singles ==
The album's lead single, "Born and Raised in Compton", was released on December 4, 1990. It peaked at number 16 on the Billboard Hot R&B/Hip-Hop Songs and spent 14 weeks on the chart. The album's second single, "Tonite" was released on June 10, 1991. It peaked at number 49 on the US Billboard Hot 100 and number 3 on the US Rap Songs chart. The song became his most successful and highest charting single to date. The album's third and final single, "Quik Is the Name", was released in 1991. The single did not chart.

== Critical response ==
Professional ratings
Review scores
Source	Rating
AllMusic	4/5 stars
Robert Christgau	(dud)
Entertainment Weekly	B+
RapReviews	8/10

Alex Henning of Rhapsody wrote that "Quik's debut set the groundwork for the G-funk era, largely due to the success of 'Tonite'. Much like Warren G, Quik focuses less on violence and more on mind-altering substances, ladies and cold chillin'. The optimistic 'Born and Raised in Compton' offers a remedy to the hard life in the ghetto." Alex Henderson of AllMusic wrote that "1991 begged the question: does rap really need yet another gangsta rapper? Indeed, by that time, rap had become saturated with numerous soundalike gangsta rappers – most of whom weren't even a fraction as interesting as such pioneers of the style as Ice-T, N.W.A, and Schoolly D. Nonetheless, rapper/producer Quik turned out to be more noteworthy than most of the gangsta rappers who debuted that year. Lyrically, the former gang member (who grew up in the same L.A. ghetto as N.W.A, Compton) doesn't provide any major insights. His sex/malt liquor/gang-banging imagery was hardly groundbreaking in 1991. But his hooks, beats, and grooves (many of which owe a debt to 1970s soul and funk) are likeable enough." Entertainment Weekly writer James Bernard said that "[T]he secrets of this debut's success – it has sold over half a million copies – are its unashamed, down-to-earth warmth and its full, thumpin' beats, which sound better in your car than at home. Through it all, DJ Quik, who wrote, arranged, and produced Is the Name, raps to us as if we were his best friends, hearing him talk about his weekend on Monday morning during first period at school."

== Accolades ==
Quik Is the Name appeared on several critics' top albums lists. In 1998, the album was listed on The Source's list of the 100 Greatest Rap Albums of All Time. The album was listed at number 28 of "The 50 Greatest Debut Albums in Hip-Hop History" by Complex. In 2022, Rolling Stone placed the album at number 156 on its list of the 200 Greatest Hip-Hop Albums of All Time. The magazine's writer Mosi Reeves said, "[T]he instrumental track 'Quik's Groove' is further evidence that Quik's dynamic musicianship offers funky multitudes that can't be limited by 'gangsta rap' stereotypes." American rapper Kendrick Lamar named it as his favorite album of all time.

== Track listing ==
No.	Title	Writer(s)	Producer(s)	Length
1.	"Sweet Black Pussy"	David Blake	DJ Quik	4:20
2.	"Tonite"	Blake	DJ Quik	5:23
3.	"Born and Raised in Compton"	Blake	DJ Quik	3:25
4.	"Deep" (featuring 2nd II None & AMG)	Blake; Darius Barnett; Jason Lewis; Kai McDonald	DJ Quik	3:42
5.	"Tha Bombudd"	Blake	DJ Quik	3:47
6.	"Dedication"	Blake; Barnett; McDonald	DJ Quik	1:30
7.	"Quik Is the Name"	Blake	DJ Quik	2:46
8.	"Loked Out Hood"	Blake	DJ Quik	2:50
9.	"8 Ball"	Blake	DJ Quik; Courtney Branch^{[a]}; Tracy Kendrick^{[a]}	3:30
10.	"Quik's Groove"	Blake	DJ Quik	1:50
11.	"Tear It Off" (featuring AMG)	Blake; Lewis	DJ Quik	3:46
12.	"I Got That Feelin'"	Blake	DJ Quik	3:38
13.	"Skanless" (featuring AMG, Hi-C & 2nd II None)	Blake; Barnett; Lewis; McDonald; Crawford Wilkerson	DJ Quik	2:54

- ^{^a} signifies an additional producer.

== Personnel ==
- 2nd II None - vocals
- AMG - vocals
- Courtney Branch - engineer, executive producer, mixing, producer
- Hi-C - vocals
- Greg Jessie - executive producer
- The Real Richie Rich - engineer, synth programmer
- Stan Jones - bass, guitar
- Tracy Kendrick - engineer, executive producer, mixing, producer
- DJ Quik - keyboards, mixing, producer
- Joe Shay - engineer
- Liz Sroka - engineer
- Howie Weinberg - mastering

== Charts ==
=== Weekly charts ===
Chart (1991)	Peak position
US Billboard 200	29
US Top R&B/Hip-Hop Albums (Billboard)	9

=== Year-end charts ===
Chart (1991)	Position
US Billboard 200	64
US Top R&B/Hip-Hop Albums (Billboard)	17

== Certifications ==
Region	Certification	Certified units/sales
United States (RIAA)	Platinum	1,068,203
