= Luv of My Life =

Single by DJ Quik featuring Gift Reynolds

from the album The Book of David
- Released: March 8, 2011
- Recorded: 2010
- Genre: Hip hop
- Length: 4:12
- Label: Mad Science; Fontana
- Songwriters: David Blake; George Archie
- Producers: DJ Quik; G-One

DJ Quik singles chronology
"Black Mercedes" (2005)	"Luv of My Life" (2011)	"Real Women" (2011)

Gift Reynolds singles chronology
"Luv of My Life" (2011)

"Luv of My Life" is the first single released off DJ Quik's eight studio album, The Book of David. It features and introduces Gift Reynolds, an artist signed to his label Mad Science Recordings.

== Background and release ==
"Luv of My Life" featuring Gift Reynolds is the first official single from the album. The song was premiered on Power 106 LA on February 1, 2011. The song was released to iTunes on March 8, 2011. It was already garnering heavy spins from top regional radio stations, including Los Angeles’ Power 106, San Francisco’s KMEL, Seattle’s KUBE, Phoenix’s KKFR and more. The song has been getting great reviews saying that his skills are just as precise now as they were two decades ago, Quik's music remains relevant and essential. “The Book of David” is yet another fine addition to the catalogue of an immensely gifted artist.

== Music video ==
The music video was shot on April 3, 2011 in a strip club and features an appearance from Compton rapper Problem. The music video was released on DJ Quik's official YouTube account on April 27, 2011.

== Track listing ==
Digital download

1. "Luv of My Life" (featuring Gift Reynolds) - 4:12

== Live performances ==
DJ Quik performed the song live along with The Roots on Late Night with Jimmy Fallon on June 10, 2011 to help promote the single and album. He also performed the song live on Fox 5 San Diego on June 23, 2011.
