= 2nd II None (album) =

Studio album by 2nd II None
- Released: October 8, 1991
- Recorded: 1991
- Studio: Kitchen Sync (Los Angeles)
- Genres: Hip hop, gangsta rap
- Length: 48:19
- Label: Profile
- Producer: DJ Quik

2nd II None chronology
2nd II None (1991)	Classic 220 (1999)

Singles from 2nd II None
- 1. "Be True to Yourself" Released: 1991; 2. "If You Want It" Released: 1992

2nd II None is the debut album by Compton hip hop duo 2nd II None. The album was released on October 8, 1991, under Profile Records and was produced by DJ Quik. It sold more than 350,000 copies in its first nine months of release.

== Critical reception ==
Professional ratings
Review scores
Source	Rating
AllMusic	4.5/5 stars
The Source	3.5/5 stars

Jonathan Gold of the Los Angeles Times praised the "bouncy, irresistible beats, clear, articulated rapping, catchy hooks and a bittersweet street sensibility that can mist you up when you least expect it." Stanton Swihart of AllMusic critiqued that the album was not groundbreaking with its "concepts and rhymes", noting the "conventional gangsta braggadocio" and "blatant strain of misogyny" the duo delivered with little "insight or ability to tweak" into a "trenchant ghetto philosophy", but praised DJ Quik's production for masking the explicit content and the duo's smooth R&B crooning in the choruses, saying they "deserve credit for breaking gangsta rap out of its aversion to the more melodious aspects of urban music."

== Track listing ==
All tracks produced by DJ Quik

No.	Title	Length
1.	"Intro"	0:55
2.	"More Than a Player"	3:16
3.	"If You Want It"	3:46
4.	"Be True to Yourself"	2:45
5.	"Let the Rhythm Take You" (featuring AMG)	4:45
6.	"Comin' Like This" (featuring DJ Quik, AMG & Hi-C)	4:54
7.	"Underground Terror"	3:39
8.	"Just Ain't Me"	2:54
9.	"The Life of a Player"	3:33
10.	"Ain't Nothin' Wrong" (featuring DJ Quik)	3:19
11.	"What Goes Up"	3:12
12.	"Mystic"	2:47
13.	"Punk Mutha Fuckaz"	2:32
14.	"Niggaz Trippin'" (featuring DJ Quik, AMG & Hi-C)	6:12

== Personnel ==
- HI-C: Additional Vocals on "Comin' Like This" and "Niggaz Trippin'"
- DJ Quik: Keyboards
- Robert Bacon: Guitars and Bass

Production

- Arranged by DJ Quik
- Produced by DJ Quik and 2nd II None
- Recorded by Sean Freehill and DJ Quik
- Mixed by DJ Quik at Skip Saylor Studios (Los Angeles)
- Mastered by Howie Weinberg at Masterdisk
- All songs published by Protoons, Inc./Greedy Greg Music, except "What Goes Up" (which contains a portion of "Spinning Wheel" as written by David Clayton Thomas). "What Goes Up" published by Protoons, Inc./Greedy Greg Music/EMI Blackwood Music Inc. and Bay Music Ltd.

== Charts ==
=== Weekly charts ===
Chart (1991)	Peak position
US Billboard 200	83
US Heatseekers Albums (Billboard)	3
US Top R&B/Hip-Hop Albums (Billboard)	26

=== Year-end charts ===
Chart (1992)	Position
US Top R&B/Hip-Hop Albums (Billboard)	43
