= Tonite (DJ Quik song) =

Single by DJ Quik

from the album Quik Is the Name
- Released: June 10, 1991
- Recorded: 1990
- Genre: West Coast hip-hop; G-funk
- Length: 5:23
- Label: Profile
- Songwriter: David Blake
- Producer: DJ Quik

DJ Quik singles chronology
"Born and Raised In Compton" (1990)	"Tonite" (1991)	"Quik Is the Name" (1991)

Music video
- "Tonite" on YouTube

"Tonite" is a song by American rapper and producer DJ Quik, released as the second single from his debut studio album Quik Is the Name. The song contains samples from "Tonight" performed by Kleeer, "Tonight Is the Night" performed by Betty Wright and "Last Night Changed It All (I Really Had a Ball)" performed by Esther Williams. Complex deemed it the 44th best of "The Best L.A. Rap Songs". The synthesizer part was programmed by LA Dream Team's former producer The Real Richie Rich.

You're taking this from the man that wrote the synthesizer part to the song that I did released and fucking in 1991, called "Tonite", that's him!

— Blake, David (April 5, 2010). "DJ Quik X EatUmUP Video X The Gooneez". RICHWORLD TV (Interview). Interviewed by The Real Richie Rich. Los Angeles. Archived from the original on 2016-03-10.

== Track listings ==
U.S. CD single

1. "Tonite" (Album Version) – 5:23
2. "Tonite" (Instrumental) – 5:13
3. "Tonite" (Seasoning Salt Remix) – 5:25
4. "Tonite" (Seasoning Salt Instrumental) – 5:16

U.S. 12" single

1. "Tonite" (Album Version) – 5:23
2. "Tonite" (Radio Edit) – 3:29
3. "Tonite" (Instrumental) – 5:12
4. "Tonite" (Seasoning Salt Remix) – 5:25
5. "Tonite" (Seasoning Salt Instrumental) – 5:16

U.S. Cassette single

1. "Tonite" – 5:23
2. "Tonite" (Seasoning Salt Remix) – 5:25

U.S. promo CD single

1. "Tonite" (Radio Edit) – 3:29
2. "Tonite" (Full-Length Radio Version) – 5:22

UK 12" single

1. "Tonite" (Album Version) – 5:23
2. "Tonite" (Radio Edit) – 3:59
3. "Tonite" (Seasoning Salt Remix) – 5:25
4. "Tonite" (Seasoning Salt Instrumental) – 4:49

== Charts ==
Chart (1991)	Peak position
U.S. Billboard Hot 100	49
U.S. Billboard Hot Dance Music/Maxi-Singles Sales	38
U.S. Billboard Hot R&B/Hip-Hop Songs	13
U.S. Billboard Hot Rap Tracks	3
