= Erick Onasis =

Def Squad Presents Erick Onasis

Studio album by Erick Sermon
- Released: June 27, 2000
- Recorded: 1999–2000
- Studio: L.I.T.E. Recording Studios (Long Island, NY); Mirror Image Recorders (New York); Masterdisk (New York); Urban House Studios, Inc. (Atlanta, GA)
- Genre: Hip hop
- Length: 47:09
- Label: Def Squad; DreamWorks
- Producer: DJ Scratch; Erick Sermon; Redman; Suave House Productions, Inc.

Erick Sermon chronology
El Niño (1998)	Def Squad Presents Erick Onasis (2000)	Music (2001)

Singles from Def Squad Presents Erick Onasis
- 1. "Focus" Released: 2000; 2. "Get da Money" Released: 2000; 3. "Why Not" Released: 2000

Professional ratings
Review scores
Source	Rating
AllMusic	3/5 stars
RapReviews	7.5/10

Def Squad Presents Erick Onasis is the third solo studio album by American rapper and record producer Erick Sermon. It was released on June 27, 2000, via Def Squad Records and DreamWorks Records.

The recording sessions took place at L.I.T.E. Recording Studios in Long Island, Mirror Image Recorders and Masterdisk in New York, and Urban House Studios, Inc. in Atlanta. The album was produced by Sermon, DJ Scratch, Redman, and Suave House Productions, Inc. It features guest appearances from Khari, Redman, Sy Scott, Big Kim, Billy Billions, Boe & Ruck, Dave Hollister, DJ Quik, Eazy-E, Ja Rule, Keith Murray, Noah, Nolan Epps, Peter Moore, PMD, Slick Rick, Too $hort, and Xzibit. It also features the recording debut of rapper Rick Ross, who went by his original name Teflon da Don.

The album peaked at number 53 on the Billboard 200 and number 15 on the Top R&B/Hip-Hop Albums charts in the United States. It was supported with three singles: "Focus", "Get da Money" and "Why Not".

== Album title significance ==
The album title is based on an alias that Sermon briefly adopted at the time for this particular album. In regards to the meaning, he stated:

"The name is something I came up with when I was watching the [coverage of the] death of JFK Jr. They [were] talking about him and his family and his mom came up, and then Aristotle came up. Then I read something on him, about four or five pages. And it was interesting to me, about how he was, how spiritual he was, how he was just coming up in the game until he mastered his field and became who he became. So I took that name".

Another reason for the album's title was due to contractual issues stemming from Sermon's previous label Def Jam Recordings. Because of the issue, Def Squad Presents Erick Onasis was promoted as a compilation album, despite Sermon's appearance and production on most of the songs.

== Track listing ==
No.	Title	Writer(s)	Producer(s)	Length
1.	"Talk to Me" (Intro)	Erick Sermon	Erick Sermon	1:41
2.	"I Do 'Em"	E. Sermon; George Spivey	DJ Scratch	2:23
3.	"Don't Get Gassed"	E. Sermon; James Boxley; Carlton Ridenhour; Eric Sadler	Erick Sermon	2:41
4.	"Why Not" (featuring Slick Rick)	E. Sermon; Richard Walters	Erick Sermon; Darryl "Pop" Trotterr (co.)	3:00
5.	"Live It up (Interlude)" (featuring Redman and Khari)	E. Sermon; Reginald Noble; Khari Santiago	Redman	2:40
6.	"Hostility" (featuring Redman and Keith Murray)	E. Sermon; Noble; Keith Murray	Erick Sermon	2:52
7.	"Mastering With E" (Skit)	E. Sermon; T. Gist	Erick Sermon	0:28
8.	"So Sweet" (featuring Eazy-E)	E. Sermon; Eric Wright; Rick Rubin; Adam Horovitz; Nathaniel Yauch; Michael Diamond	Erick Sermon	3:17
9.	"Focus" (featuring DJ Quik and Xzibit)	E. Sermon; David Blake; Alvin Joiner; Roger Troutman; Larry Troutman	Erick Sermon; DJ Quik (add.)	4:25
10.	"Feel Me Baby" (featuring Khari and Sy Scott)	E. Sermon; Santiago; Sy Scott	Erick Sermon	3:16
11.	"Can't Stop" (featuring Dave Hollister and Peter Moore)	E. Sermon; Dave Hollister; Peter Moore; Malik Taylor; Ali Shaheed Muhammad; Ronnie Foster; Jonathan Davis	Erick Sermon	4:05
12.	"Get da Money" (featuring Ja Rule)	E. Sermon; Jeffrey Atkins	Erick Sermon	3:38
13.	"Ain't Shhh to Discuss" (featuring Rick Ross and Noah)	E. Sermon; William Roberts; Noah Stephenson; Triston Jones	Suave House Productions, Inc.	3:36
14.	"Sermon" (Speech)	E. Sermon	Erick Sermon	0:56
15.	"Vangundy" (featuring Big Kim, Sy Scott, Nolan Epps, Boe & Ruck, Billy Billions and PMD)	E. Sermon; Kim Sermon; Scott; Nolan Epps; T. Warren; Robert Sherman; Harrell Dixon; Parrish Smith	Erick Sermon	4:51
16.	"Fat Gold Chain" (featuring Too $hort)	E. Sermon; Todd Shaw	Erick Sermon	3:20
Total length:				47:09

Sample credits

- Track 3 contains excerpts from "Don't Believe the Hype" written by James Boxley, Carlton Ridenhour and Eric Sadler, performed by Public Enemy.
- Track 6 contains excerpts from Public Enemy's It Takes a Nation of Millions to Hold Us Back.
- Track 8 contains excerpts from "New Style" written by Rick Rubin, Adam Horovitz, Adam Yauch and Michael Diamond, performed by the Beastie Boys.
- Track 9 contains an interpolation from "I Play the Talk Box" written by Larry Troutman and Roger Troutman.
- Track 11 contains excerpts from "Electric Relaxation" written by Malik Taylor, Ali Muhammed-Jones, Ronnie Foster and John Davis, performed by A Tribe Called Quest.

== Personnel ==
- Erick Sermon – vocals, producer (tracks: 1, 3, 4, 6–12, 14–16), mixing (tracks: 13, 15), executive producer, sleeve notes
- Richard "Slick Rick" Walters – vocals (track 4)
- Reginald "Redman" Noble – vocals (tracks: 5, 6), producer (track 5)
- Khari Santiago – vocals (tracks: 5, 10)
- Keith Murray – vocals (track 6)
- Eric "Eazy-E" Wright – vocals (track 8)
- David "DJ Quik" Blake – vocals and additional producer (track 9)
- Alvin "Xzibit" Joiner – vocals (track 9)
- Sy Scott – vocals (tracks: 10, 15)
- Dave Hollister – vocals (track 11)
- Peter Moore – vocals (track 11)
- Jeffrey "Ja Rule" Atkins – vocals (track 12)
- William "Rick Ross" Roberts – vocals (track 13)
- Noah Stephenson – vocals (track 13)
- Kim "Big Kim" Sermon – vocals (track 15)
- Nolan Epps – vocals (track 15)
- T. Warren – vocals (track 15)
- Robert Sherman – vocals (track 15)
- Harrell Dixon – vocals (track 15)
- Parrish "PMD" Smith – vocals (track 15)
- Todd "Too $hort" Shaw – vocals (track 16)
- George "DJ Scratch" Spivey – producer (track 2)
- Triston "T-Mix" Jones – producer (track 13)
- Darryl "Pop" Trotter – co-producer (track 4)
- Tommy Uzzo – engineering & mixing (tracks: 2, 4, 11)
- Marc Berto – engineering & mixing (tracks: 3, 5, 8–10, 12, 15, 16)
- Troy Hightower – engineering & mixing (track 6)
- Bernard Alexander – executive producer, marketing
- Jaycen Joshua – associate executive producer
- Johnny Sparkles – art direction, design
- Jonathan Mannion – photography
- Ron Handler – A&R
- Kisha Maldonado-Madrid – A&R, project management
- Chris Tricarico – project coordinator
- Deborah Mannis-Gardner – sample clearances

== Chart history ==
Chart (2000)	Peak position
US Billboard 200	53
US Top R&B/Hip-Hop Albums (Billboard)	15
