= 2nd II None =

American rap duo from Compton, California

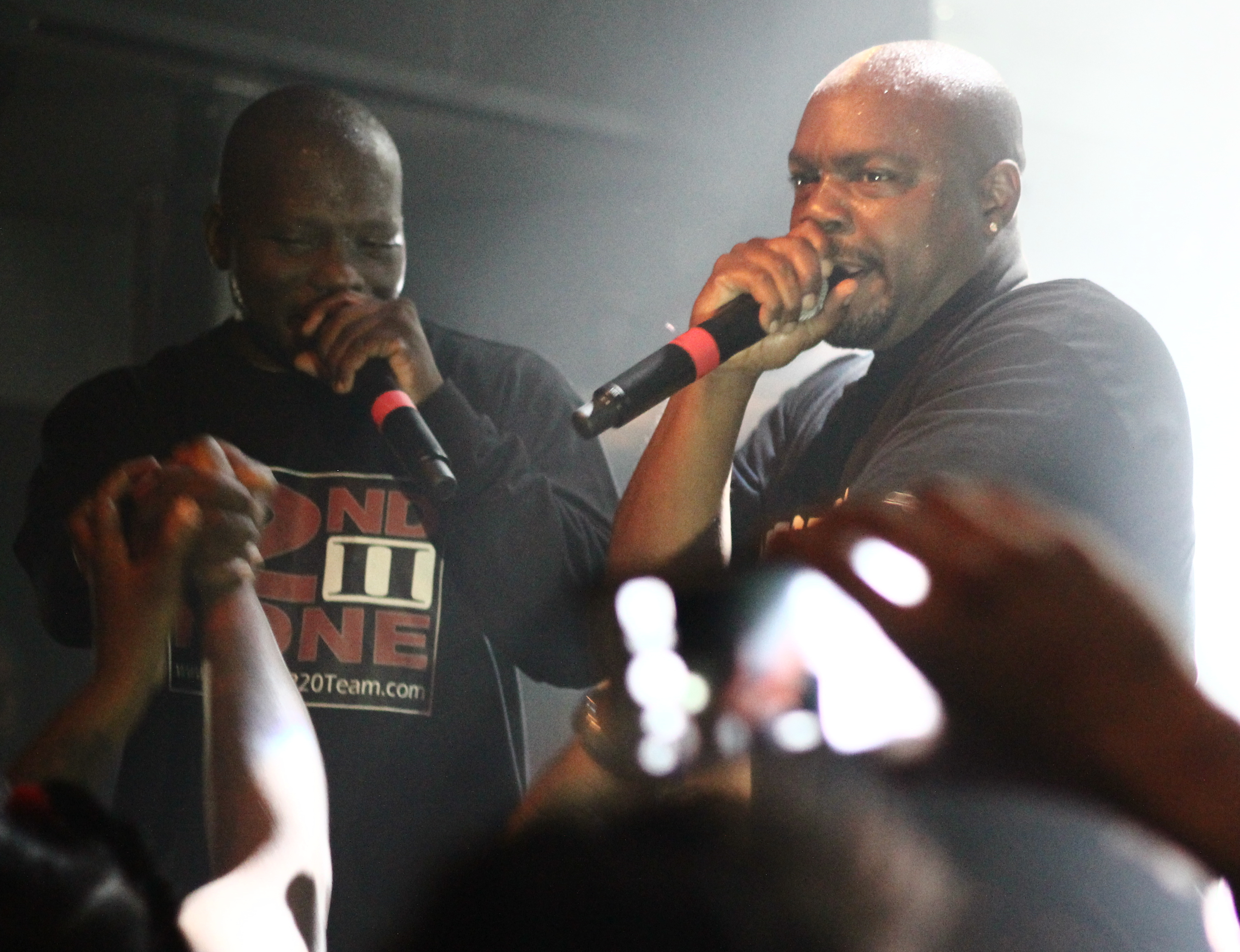
- 2nd II None in 2014

Background information
- Origin: Compton, California, U.S.
- Genre: West Coast hip hop
- Years active: 1987–present
- Labels: Profile; Arista; Death Row
- Members: BlaKKazz K.K.; Tha Dee a.k.a Gangsta D

2nd II None is a hip hop duo from Compton, California, consisting of cousins KK ( L. McDonald) and Tha Dee a.k.a Gangsta D (Deon Barnett). Closely associated with producer-rapper DJ Quik, the pair released their self-titled debut on Profile Records in 1991 and Classic 220 on Arista in 1999, followed by the independent album Compton Muzik in 2014. Their songs “Be True to Yourself” and “If You Want It” brought national notice in the early 1990s, and “Up ’N Da Club” later appeared in the 2000 The Sopranos episode “Full Leather Jacket.”

== History ==
After early work alongside childhood friend DJ Quik, 2nd II None signed to Profile Records and issued their debut album, 2nd II None, in 1991. Quik handled the bulk of production and also appeared as a guest. In February 1992, the duo shared a Los Angeles bill with Cypress Hill, a show the Los Angeles Times singled out for its stylistic contrast and energy.

The group returned with Classic 220 in 1999 on Arista, with contributions from Quik and longtime affiliates; its single “Up ’N Da Club” later gained renewed exposure via The Sopranos. In 2014 the duo self-released Compton Muzik, produced primarily by Gangsta D and collaborators, marking their first full-length in 15 years.

In 2022, KK released a solo album, DediKKated, under the name BlaKKazz KK.

== In popular culture ==
- The song “Up ’N Da Club” is featured in The Sopranos, Season 2, episode 8 (“Full Leather Jacket”).

== Discography ==
=== Studio albums ===
Title	Release	Label	Peak chart positions
2nd II None	1991	Profile	US Billboard 200: 83; US Top R&B/Hip-Hop Albums: 26; US Heatseekers: 3
Classic 220	1999	Arista	US Billboard 200: 162; US Top R&B/Hip-Hop Albums: 40
Compton Muzik	2014	220 Entertainment	—

=== Compilation albums ===
- 2nd II None Presents: Tha Kollective (2009, RBC/BMG)

=== Unreleased albums ===
- The Shit

=== Singles ===
Title	Year	US R&B	US Rap	Album
"Be True to Yourself"	1991	54	—	2nd II None
"If You Want It"	1992	54	19	2nd II None
"Didn't Mean to Turn You On"	1994	—	—	Above the Rim soundtrack
"Up ’N Da Club"	1999	—	—	Classic 220
