= DJ Quik discography =

- Studio albums: 9
- Extended plays: 1
- Live albums: 1
- Compilation albums: 3
- Singles: 20
- Music videos: 13
- Mixtapes: 3

This is the discography of DJ Quik, an American hip-hop artist and record producer. This list includes all of the official album and single releases, including his albums, Quik Is the Name, which debuted at No. 29 on the US Billboard 200 chart, and No. 9 on the Top R&B/Hip-Hop Albums in 1991. Way 2 Fonky, which debuted at No. 10 on the US Billboard 200 chart, and No. 13 on the Top R&B/Hip-Hop Albums in 1992. Safe + Sound, which debuted at No. 14 on the US Billboard 200 chart, and No. 1 on the Top R&B/Hip-Hop Albums in 1995. Rhythm-al-ism, which debuted at No. 63 on the US Billboard 200 chart, and No. 13 on the Top R&B/Hip-Hop Albums in 1995. Balance & Options, which was his first album not to chart and not to receive a RIAA certification in 2000. Under tha Influence, which debuted at No. 27 on the US Billboard 200 chart, and No. 7 on the Top R&B/Hip-Hop Albums in 2002. Trauma, which debuted at No. 43 on the US Billboard 200 chart, No. 13 on the Top R&B/Hip-Hop Albums, No. 9 on the Rap Albums, and No. 1 on the Independent Albums in 2005.

== Albums ==
=== Studio albums ===
List of studio albums, with selected chart positions, sales figures and certifications
Title	Album details	Peak chart positions				Sales	Certifications
Title	Album details	US	US R&B	US Rap	US Ind	Sales	Certifications
Quik Is the Name	Released: January 15, 1991; Label: Profile; Format: CD, LP, cassette, digital download	29	9	—	—	US: 1,068,203	RIAA: Platinum
Way 2 Fonky	Released: July 20, 1992; Label: Profile; Format: CD, LP, cassette, digital download	10	13	—	—	US: 500,000	RIAA: Gold
Safe + Sound	Released: February 21, 1995; Label: Profile; Format: CD, LP, cassette, digital download	14	1	—	—	US: 500,000	RIAA: Gold
Rhythm-al-ism	Released: November 10, 1998; Label: Profile, Arista; Format: CD, LP, cassette, digital download	63	13	—	—	US: 502,000	RIAA: Gold
Balance & Options	Released: May 16, 2000; Label: Arista; Format: CD, LP, cassette, digital download	18	5	—	—	US: 324,000	
Under tha Influence	Released: June 4, 2002; Label: Ark 21, Bungalo; Format: CD, LP, cassette, digital download	27	7	—	—	US: 138,000	
Trauma	Released: September 13, 2005; Label: Mad Science, Fontana; Format: CD, LP, digital download	43	13	9	1	US: 100,000	
The Book of David	Released: April 19, 2011; Label: Mad Science, Fontana; Format: CD, LP, digital download	55	12	5	4	US: 27,000	
The Midnight Life	Released: October 14, 2014; Label: Mad Science, Ingrooves; Format: CD, LP, digital download	63	11	7	11	US: 5,097	
"—" denotes a recording that did not chart or was not released in that territory.

=== Collaborative albums ===
List of collaborative albums, with selected chart positions and sales figures
Title	Album details	Peak chart positions				Sales
Title	Album details	US	US R&B	US Rap	US Ind	Sales
Blaqkout (with Kurupt)	Released: June 9, 2009; Label: Mad Science, Fontana; Format: CD, digital download	61	11	6	9	US: 30,000
Rosecrans: The Album (with Problem)	Released: April 20, 2017; Label: Diamond Lane; Format: Digital download	—	—	—	—	

=== Compilation albums ===
List of compilation albums, with selected chart positions
Title	Album details	Peak chart positions	
Title	Album details	US R&B	US Rap
The Best of DJ Quik: Da Finale	Released: November 19, 2002; Label: Arista; Format: CD, LP	43	—
Platinum & Gold Collection	Released: June 17, 2004; Label: BMG Heritage, Arista; Format: CD	—	—
Born and Raised in Compton: The Greatest Hits	Released: August 8, 2006; Label: Arista; Format: CD	—	—
"—" denotes a title that did not chart, or was not released in that territory.

=== Live albums ===
List of live albums, with selected chart positions
Title	Album details	Peak chart positions	
Title	Album details	US R&B	US Rap
Greatest Hits: Live at the House of Blues	Released: June 6, 2006; Label: Mad Science, Fontana; Format: CD	36	20

=== Instrumental albums ===
Title	Album details
Trauma Instrumentals	Released: January 24, 2006; Label: Mad Science, Fontana; Format: CD, LP

== Extended plays ==
Title	EP details
The Death Row Sessions EP	Released: December, 2007; Label: Death Row; Format: CDr

== Mixtapes ==
- 1989 or 1990: The Red Tape
- 2005: The Trauma Mixtape
- 2011: The Audio Biography of David

== Singles ==
=== As lead artist ===
List of singles, with selected chart positions
Title	Year	Peak chart positions			Album
Title	Year	US	US R&B	US Rap	Album
"Born and Raised in Compton"	1990	—	16	4	Quik Is the Name
"Tonite"	1991	49	13	3	Quik Is the Name
"Quik Is the Name"	1991	—	—	—	Quik Is the Name
"Jus Lyke Compton"	1992	62	37	4	Way 2 Fonky
"Way 2 Fonky"	1992	—	93	—	Way 2 Fonky
"Safe + Sound"	1995	81	56	21	Safe + Sound
"Summer Breeze"	1995	—	110	—	Safe + Sound
"You'z a Ganxta"	1998	—	59	—	Rhythm-al-ism
"Hand in Hand" (featuring 2nd II None & El DeBarge)	1998	—	66	—	Rhythm-al-ism
"Down, Down, Down" (featuring AMG, Suga Free & Mausberg)	1998	—	59	—	Rhythm-al-ism
"Pitch in on a Party"	1999	—	68	—	Balance & Options
"Quikker Said than Dunn"	1999	—	—	—	Balance & Options
"Do I Love Her?" (featuring Suga Free)	2000	—	108	—	Balance & Options
"Put It on Me" (featuring Dr. Dre & Mimi)	2001	—	58	—	Training Day (soundtrack) / Under tha Influence
"Trouble" (featuring AMG)	2002	—	55	—	Under tha Influence
"What They Think Of You"	2004	—	103	—	Non-album single
"Black Mercedes" (featuring Nate Dogg)	2005	—	—	—	Trauma
"Fandango" (featuring B-Real)	2005	—	—	—	Trauma
"Get Down" (featuring Chingy)	2005	—	105	—	Trauma
"Ladies & Thugs" (featuring Wyclef Jean)	2005	—	—	—	Trauma
"Luv of My Life" (featuring Gift Reynolds)	2011	—	—	—	The Book of David
"Real Women" (featuring Jon B.)	2011	—	—	—	The Book of David
"Nobody" (featuring Suga Free)	2011	—	—	—	The Book of David
"Black Friday"	2016	—	—	—	
"World Girl"	2018	—	—	—	
"Class"	2023	—	—	—	
"—" denotes a title that did not chart, or was not released in that territory.

=== As featured artist ===
List of singles, with selected chart positions
Title	Year	Peak chart positions				Album
Title	Year	US	US R&B	NZ	UK	Album
"Trust No Bitch" (Penthouse Players Clique featuring DJ Quik, AMG, Eazy-E)	1992	—	—	—	—	Paid the Cost
"P.S. Phuk U 2" (Penthouse Players Clique featuring DJ Quik, Eazy-E)	1992	—	—	—	—	Paid the Cost
"Let's Get Down" (Tony! Toni! Toné! featuring DJ Quik)	1996	30	4	8	33	House of Music
"Strait Playin'" (Shaquille O'Neal featuring DJ Quik & Peter Gunz)	1997	—	33	13	—	You Can't Stop the Reign
"Up "N" Da Club" (2nd II None featuring DJ Quik & AMG)	1999	—	107	—	—	Classic 220
"Focus" (Erick Sermon featuring DJ Quik & Xzibit)	2000	—	55	—	—	Erick Onasis
"Buck Bounce" (8Ball & MJG featuring DJ Quik)	2000	—	—	—	—	Space Age 4 Eva
"I'm Not Really Lookin" (Truth Hurts featuring DJ Quik)	2002	—	105	—	—	Truthfully Speaking
"John Doe" (Shade Sheist featuring DJ Quik, Hi-C, AMG & Swift)	2002	—	64	—	—	Informal Introduction
"Let Me Know" (Hi-C featuring DJ Quik)	2003	—	73	—	—	The Hi-Life Hustle
"Rise to Glory" (E.S. Posthumus featuring DJ Quik & Bizarre)	2005	—	—	—	—	Non-album single
"I'm Toe Up (Remix)" (Problem featuring DJ Felli Fel, DJ Quik, Kurupt, Terrace Martin and Snoop Dogg)	2008	—	—	—	—	—N/a
"Let Me Tell You" (Sammattick and Egypt Criss featuring D. Blake)	2019	—	—	—	—	Levelz
"—" denotes a title that did not chart, or was not released in that territory.

== Guest appearances ==
List of non-single guest appearances, with other performing artists, showing year released and album name
Title	Year	Other performer(s)	Album
"Hip House"	1990	Uzi $ Bros, Calvin Crush 20/20, Playa Hamm, Richie Rich	Kick That Thang
"Comin' Like This"	1991	2nd II None, AMG, Hi-C	2nd II None
"Ain't Nothin' Wrong"	1991	2nd II None	2nd II None
"Niggaz Trippin"	1991	2nd II None, AMG, Hi-C	2nd II None
"Skanless"	1991	Hi-C, AMG, K.K.	Skanless
"Juvenile Thang"	1993	Juvenile Committee, Playa Hamm	Free Us Colored Kids
"Can't Fuck wit a Nigga"	1993	—N/a	Menace II Society (soundtrack)
"Dollaz & Sense"	1994	—N/a	Murder Was the Case / Safe + Sound
"Tip Toe"	1997	Suga Free, Hi-C	Street Gospel
"Three the Hard Way"	1998	J. Dupri, Mr. Black, R.O.C.	Life in 1472
"Westside Part II (My Melody)"	1998	TQ, James DeBarge, Hi-C, Playa Hamm, Suga Free	—N/a
"It's Like Everyday"	1999	R. Kelly	Life (soundtrack)
"Funkin' Till 2000 Comz"	1999	The Gap Band, Snoop Dogg	Y2K: Funkin' Till 2000 Comz
"Got a Nu Woman"	1999	2nd II None, AMG, Hi-C, Playa Hamm	Classic 220
"Get tha Money (Dollar Bill)"	1999	Hi-C, El DeBarge	Swing'n / Deep Blue Sea (soundtrack)
"Get Nekkid"	2000	Mausberg	Non Fiction
"Tha Truth Is..."	2000	Mausberg	Non Fiction
"No More Questionz"	2000	Mausberg	Non Fiction
"Jankie"	2000	8Ball & MJG	Space Age 4 Eva
"Soak Me Baby"	2000	AMG	Bitch Betta Have My Money 2001
"Sorry I'm Away So Much"	2000	Xzibit, Suga Free	Restless
"I Wanna See"	2000	Hi-C	The Konnectid Project, Vol. 1
"Hotel Motel"	2000	Suga Free, Madd Nation	The Konnectid Project, Vol. 1
"Pimpin"	2000	Suga Free, Playa Hamm, James DeBarge, Double M	The Konnectid Project, Vol. 1
"Don't Walk Away"	2000	Suga Free	The Konnectid Project, Vol. 1
"Can't Go Wrong"	2001	Kurupt, Butch Cassidy	Space Boogie: Smoke Oddessey
"Dance"	2001	Christopher Williams, Hi-C	Real Men Do
"Time Iz Money"	2001	Big Syke, E-40	Big Syke Daddy
"Nothing's Wrong"	2002	Won G, James DeBarge	Explosion
"Put It in the Air"	2002	Talib Kweli	Quality
"Late Night"	2002	2Pac, Outlawz	Better Dayz
"Let's Make a V"	2002	King Tee, Frost, James DeBarge	Thy Kingdom Come
"So Cold"	2002	Butch Cassidy	—N/a
"There She Goes"	2003	Nate Dogg, Warren G	Nate Dogg
"Coochie Coochie"	2003	Hi-C	The Hi-Life Hustle
"Shine"	2004	Jadakiss, Snoop Dogg	Kiss of Death
"Spur of the Moment"	2004	Ludacris, Kimmi J.	The Red Light District
"Loyal to the Game (DJ Quik Remix)"	2004	2Pac, Big Syke	Loyal to the Game
"Church"	2005	Do or Die, James Prince	D.O.D.
"No Problem (Remix)"	2005	Lil Scrappy	Whut It Dew, Vol. 1
"Ridin' (West Coast Remix)"	2006	Chamillionaire, The Game, Crooked I	—N/a
"Poppin' Off"	2006	Xzibit, King Tee	Full Circle
"Hurt Someone"	2007	Twiztid, Tha Dogg Pound	Independents Day
"Bounce, Rock, Skate"	2008	Terrace Martin, DJ Drama, Snoop Dogg, Kurupt	Locke High
"Hello"	2008	Terrace Martin, J. Black, Kurupt	Locke High
"Died Too Soon"	2008	Busta Rhymes, The Game	Surrender
"Like Me"	2009	Yung Berg, Kay L	—N/a
"Certified Boss"	2009	Down AKA Kilo, Detail	Cholo Skate
"I Love the Hoes"	2009	Mike Epps	Funny Bidness: Da Album
"Bounce, Rock, Skate (Kurupted Mix)"	2010	Kurupt, DJ Drama, Terrace Martin, Snoop Dogg	Streetlights
"L.O.V.E."	2010	Frank Nitt, J. Black	Jewels In My Backpack
"I Wanna"	2010	Dwele	W.ants W.orld W.omen
"So Westcoast"	2010	Nick Cannon	Child of the Corn
"Take It Off"	2011	Kurupt	Penagon Rydaz
"Fill Your Cup"	2012	Jon B.	Comfortable Swagg
"Amsterdam"	2012	Mann	FMOV: Freshmann On Varsity
"The World Be Like?"	2012	Two-J	The World Be Like? (digital download only)
"Hypnotize You"	2014	Bishop Lamont	—N/a
"Bicken Back Bein Bool"	2014	YG, Mack 10, Big Wy	Blame It on the Streets
"Addicted"	2015	TeeFlii, Snoop Dogg	Starr
"Quik's Groove"	2015	The Game, Sevyn Streeter, Micah	The Documentary 2.5
"Fuck Em'All"	2016	Boogie, Mozzy	Thirst 48, Part II
"How the West Was On"	2016	Big Tray Deee, Rodney O	The 3rd Coming
"Choose Up"	2018	Berner, Ty Dolla $ign	Rico
"Hearts"	2019	Suga Free, E.D.I. Mean	The Resurrection
"I Feel Great"	2020	Xzibit, Demrick, B-Real	Summer of Sam
"105 West"	2024	Jay Worthy, Dam-Funk, A-Trak, Ty Dolla $ign, Channel Tres	Magic Hour
Take Your Time Get Paid	2025	Wiz Khalifa	Kush & OJ 2

== Music videos ==
=== As lead artist ===
List of music videos as lead artist, showing year released and director
Year	Title	Director	Album
1990	"Born and Raised In Compton"	Ian Fletcher	Quik Is the Name
1991	"Tonite"	Ian Fletcher	Quik Is the Name
1991	"Quik Is the Name"	Eric Meza	Quik Is the Name
1992	"Jus Lyke Compton"	—N/a	Way 2 Fonky
1992	"Way 2 Fonky"	—N/a	Way 2 Fonky
1995	"Safe + Sound"	Michael T. Martin	Safe + Sound
1998	You'z a Ganxta	—N/a	Rhythm-al-ism
1998	"Hand in Hand" (featuring 2nd II None & El DeBarge)	Terry Heller	Rhythm-al-ism
2000	"Pitch in on a Party"	Patrick Hoelck	Balance & Options
2000	"Sweet Black Pussy"	—N/a	Quik Is the Name
2002	"Trouble" (featuring AMG)	J. Jesses Smith	Under tha Influence
2009	"Blue Line Family Running Things" (featuring Terrace Martin)	—N/a	—N/a
2011	"Luv of My Life" (featuring Gift Reynolds)	Hilton Carter	The Book of David
2011	"Nobody" (featuring Suga Free)	Daniel Czernilofsky	The Book of David
2013	"Life Jacket"	Jon Casey	The Midnight Life
2014	"Trapped on the Tracks" (featuring Bishop Lamont & David Blake)	RILLAH	The Midnight Life

=== Collaboration videos ===
List of music videos as lead artist, showing year released and director
Year	Title	Director	Album
2005	"Rise to Glory" (with E.S. Posthumus & Bizarre)		—N/a
2007	"Can U Werk Wid Dat" (as The Fixxers)	—N/a	Midnight Life
2009	"9x's Outta 10" (with Kurupt)	D. Baker	Blaqkout
2009	"Do You Know" (with Kurupt)	D. Baker	Blaqkout
2009	"Hey Playa (Moroccan Blues)" (with Kurupt)	Erick "Ketchup" Peyton	Blaqkout

=== Featured music videos ===
List of music videos as lead artist, showing year released and director
Year	Title	Director	Album
1992	"P.S. Phuk U 2" (Penthouse Players Clique featuring DJ Quik & Eazy-E)	—N/a	Paid the Cost
1993	"Juvenile Thang" (Juvenile Committee featuring DJ Quik & Playa Hamm)	—N/a	Free Us Colored Kids
1996	"Let's Get Down" (Tony! Toni! Toné! featuring DJ Quik)	Joseph Kahn	House of Music
1997	"Strait Playin'" (Shaquille O'Neal featuring Peter Gunz & DJ Quik)	Cameron Casey	You Can't Stop the Reign
1999	"Up N Da Club" (2nd II None featuring DJ Quik & AMG)	G. Thomas	Classic 220
2000	"Focus" (Erick Sermon featuring DJ Quik & Xzibit)	Diane Martel	Erick Onasis
2000	"Buck Bounce" (8Ball & MJG featuring DJ Quik)	Gifted Talents	Space Age 4 Eva
2011	"Bounce, Rock, Skate" (Terrace Martin featuring DJ Quik, Snoop Dogg & Kurupt)	Matt Alonzo	Locke High
2025	Take Your Time Get Paid (Wiz Khalifa feat. DJ Quik)	Jo Lenz + Nobody Else	Kush & OJ 2

=== Cameo appearances ===
- 1991: "Be True To Yourself" by 2nd II None
- 1991: "Leave My Curl Alone" by Hi-C
- 1994: "Bringin' The Funk" by STR8-G
- 1996: "California Love (RMX)" by 2Pac feat. Dr. Dre and Roger Troutman
- 1997: "If U Stay Ready" by Suga Free feat. Playa Hamm
- 1998: "The Way It's Goin' Down" by Shaquille O'Neal feat. Peter Gunz
- 2001: "Get Your Walk On" by Xzibit
- 2001: "Nothing's Wrong" by Won G. feat. James DeBarge
- 2002: "Addictive" by Truth Hurts feat. Rakim
- 2004: "How We Do" by The Game feat. 50 Cent
- 2006: "Cali Iz Active" by Tha Dogg Pound feat. Snoop Dogg
- 2007: "Lift Me Up" by Jay Rock
- 2009: "Pronto" by Snoop Dogg feat. Soulja Boy
- 2010: "And U Do Know That" by Mac Shawn
- 2010: "Rocketeer" by Far East Movement feat. Ryan Tedder
- 2010: "New Year's Eve" by Snoop Dogg feat. Marty James
- 2010: "On Point" by Strong Arm Steady feat. Too Short
- 2010: "Tell A Friend 2 Tell A Friend" by Mann
- 2011: "That's How I Roll Up" by Flesh-n-Bone
- 2012: "Way Too Gone" by Young Jeezy feat. Future
