= List of songs recorded by DJ Quik =

The following is a list of songs by DJ Quik organized by alphabetical order. The songs on the list are all included in official label-released albums, soundtracks and singles, but not white label or other non-label releases. Next to the song titles is the album, soundtrack, or single on which it appears. Remixes and live versions of songs are listed as bullet points below the original song, but clean, explicit, a cappella and instrumental tracks are not included.

Contents:	Top - 0-9 A B C D E F G H I J K L M N O P Q R S T W Y External links

== 0-9 ==
1. "2 Skanless" by Hi-C; featuring DJ Quik, AMG & KK (Skanless, 1991)
2. "50 Ways" featuring Wanya Morris (Under tha Influence, 2002)
3. "8 Ball" (Quik Is the Name, 1991)
4. "9x's Outta 10" with Kurupt (BlaQKout, 2009)

== A ==
1. "Across the Map" featuring Bun B & Bizzy Bone (The Book of David, 2011)
2. "Ain't Nothin' Wrong" by 2nd II None; featuring DJ Quik (2nd II None, 1991)
3. "America'z Most Complete Artist" (Way 2 Fonky, 1992)

== B ==
1. "Babylon" featuring Bizzy Bone & BlaKKazz K.K. (The Book of David, 2011)
2. "Balance & Options (Outro)" (Balance & Options, 2000)
3. "Bees to the Honey" with Kurupt (BlaQKout, 2009)
4. "Birdz & da Beez" featuring Hi-C & AMG (Under tha Influence, 2002)
5. "Black Mercedes" featuring Nate Dogg (Trauma, 2005)
6. "BlaQKout" with Kurupt (BlaQKout, 2009)
7. "Blueline Family Runnin' Thangs" with Terrace Martin (Leaked, 2009)
8. "Bombudd II" (Rhythm-al-ism, 1998)
9. "Boom" (The Death Row Sessions EP, 2007)
10. "Boogie Till You Conk Out" featuring Ice Cube (The Book of David, 2011)
  - "Boogie Till You Conk Out (Remix)" featuring Ice Cube ("The Audio Biography of David," 2011)
11. "Born and Raised In Compton" (Quik Is the Name, 1991)
12. "Bounce, Rock, Shake" by Terrace Martin; featuring DJ Drama, DJ Quik, Terrace Martin, Snoop Dogg & Kurupt (Locke High, 2008)
  - "Bounce, Rock, Shake (Kurupted Mix)" by Kurupt; featuring DJ Drama, DJ Quik, Terrace Martin & Snoop Dogg (Streetlights, 2010)
13. "Buck Bounce" by 8Ball & MJG; featuring DJ Quik (Space Age 4 Eva, 2000)

== C ==
1. "California" featuring AMG (Trauma, 2005)
2. "Can I Eat It?" featuring Crystal Cerrano (Safe + Sound, 1995)
3. "Can You Werk Wid Dat" by The Fixxers (Midnight Life, 2007)
  - "Can You Werk Wid Dat (Remix)" featuring Jim Jones (Midnight Life, 2007)
4. "Can't Go Wrong" by Kurupt; featuring DJ Quik & Butch Cassidy (Space Boogie: Smoke Oddessey, 2001)
5. "Catch 22" (Trauma, 2005)
6. "Certified Boss" by Down AKA Kilo; featuring DJ Quik & Detail (Cholo Skate , 2009)
7. "Change da Game" featuring Mausberg (Balance & Options, 2000)
8. "Church"; Do or Die featuring DJ Quik & James Prince (D.O.D., 2005)
9. "Come 2Nyte" featuring Truth Hurts (Under tha Influence, 2002)
10. "Comin' Like This" by 2nd II None; featuring AMG, Hi-C & DJ Quik (2nd II None, 1991)
11. "Coochie Coochie" by Hi-C; featuring DJ Quik (The Hi-Life Hustle, 2003)
12. "Cream N Ya Panties" with Kurupt featuring Tre Mak (BlaQKout, 2009)

== D ==
1. "Dedication" (Quik Is the Name, 1991)
2. "Deep" featuring 2nd II None & AMG (Quik Is the Name, 1991)
3. "Did Y'all Feel Dat" featuring Mausberg & Skaboobie (Balance & Options, 2000)
4. "Died Too Soon" by Busta Rhymes; featuring Game & DJ Quik (Unreleased, 2006)
5. "Diggin' U Out" (Safe + Sound, 1995)
  - "Diggin' U Out (Remix)" (Unreleased, 1995)
6. "Do I Love Her?" featuring Suga Free (Balance & Options, 2000)
7. "Do Today" featuring BlaKKazz K.K. & Jon B. (The Book of David, 2011)
8. "Do Whatcha Want" featuring Digital Underground & AMG (Balance & Options, 2000)
9. "Do You Know" with Kurupt (BlaQKout, 2009)
10. "Doctor's Office (Intro)" (Trauma, 2005)
11. "Doe" by The Fixxers (Midnight Life, 2007)
12. "Does the Good Life Exist" featuring Shawn Anthony (The Trauma Mixtape, 2005)
13. "Dollaz + Sence" (Safe + Sound, 1995)
14. "Don't You Eat It! (Interlude)" (Safe + Sound, 1995)
15. "Dough" (The Trauma Mixtape, 2005)
16. "Down, Down, Down" featuring Suga Free, AMG & Mausberg (Rhythm-al-ism, 1998)

== E ==
1. "El's DeBarge" featuring El DeBarge (Rhythm-al-ism, 1998)
2. "Ev'ryday" featuring Hi-C & James DeBarge (Under tha Influence, 2002)
3. "Exodus" with Kurupt (BlaQKout, 2009)

== F ==
1. "Fandango" featuring B-Real (Trauma, 2005)
2. "Fill Your Cup" by Jon B.; featuring DJ Quik (Unreleased, 2010)
3. "Fire and Brimstone" (The Book of David, 2011)
4. "Flow for Sale" featuring Kurupt (The Book of David, 2011)
5. "Focus" by Erick Sermon; featuring DJ Quik & Xzibit (Def Squad Presents Erick Onasis, 2000)
6. "Fuck Y'all" with Kurupt featuring Puff Johnson (BlaQKout, 2009)
7. "Funkin' Till 2000 Comz" by The Gap Band; featuring DJ Quik & Snoop Dogg (Funkin' Till 2000 Comz, 1999)

== G ==
1. "Get 2Getha Again" featuring 2nd II None, AMG, Hi-C & El DeBarge (Rhythm-al-ism, 1998)
2. "Get at Me" (Safe + Sound, 1995)
3. "Get Down" featuring Chingy (Trauma, 2005)
4. "Get Loaded" featuring AMG (Under tha Influence, 2002)
5. "Get Nekkid" by Mausberg; featuring DJ Quik & James DeBarge (Non-Fiction, 2000)
6. "Get tha Money" featuring Suga Free (Under tha Influence, 2002)
7. "Get tha Money (Dollar Bill)" by Hi-C; featuring DJ Quik (Deep Blue Sea (soundtrack), 1999)
8. "Get Up" featuring The Game & AMG (Trauma, 2005)
9. "Ghetto Rendezvous" (The Book of David, 2011)
10. "Gina Statuatorre" featuring Chuckey (Under tha Influence, 2002)
11. "Got a Nu Woman" by 2nd II None; featuring AMG, Hi-C, Playa Hamm & DJ Quik (Classic 220, 1999)

== H ==
1. "Hand In Hand" featuring 2nd II None & El DeBarge (Rhythm-al-ism, 1998)
2. "I'm Toe Up (Remix)" by Terrace Martin; featuring DJ Quik, Kurupt, Tone & J. Black (Locke High, 2008)
3. "Hey Playa (Moroccan Blues)" with Kurupt (BlaQKout, 2009)
4. "Hoorah 4 tha Funk (Reprise)" featuring Garry Shider (Safe + Sound, 1995)
5. "How Come?" (Balance & Options, 2000)
6. "Hurt Someone" by Twiztid; featuring DJ Quik & Tha Dogg Pound (Independents Day, 2007)
7. "Hydromatic" featuring Jon B. & Gift Reynolds (The Book of David, 2011)

== I ==
1. "I Don't Wanna Party Wit U" (Balance & Options, 2000)
2. "I Got That Feelin'" (Quik Is the Name, 1991)
3. "I Love the Hoes" by Mike Epps; featuring DJ Quik (Funny Bidness: Da Album, 2009)
4. "I Useta Know Her" featuring AMG (Safe + Sound, 1995)
5. "I Wanna" by Dwele; featuring DJ Quik (W.ants W.orld W.omen, 2010)
6. "Indiscretions In The Back Of The Limo" featuring T.I. (Trauma, 2005)
7. "Intro for Roger" (Trauma, 2005)
8. "I'm Not Really Lookin'" by Truth Hurts; featuring DJ Quik (Truthfully Speaking, 2002)
9. "I'm Toe Up (Remix)" by Terrace Martin; featuring DJ Quik, Kurupt, Snoop Dogg & Problem (Locke High, 2008)
10. "It's Like Everyday" by DJ Quik; featuring Mausberg & R. Kelly (Life (soundtrack), 1999)
11. "It'z Your Fantasy" featuring Dionne Knighton (Safe + Sound, 1995)

== J ==
1. "Jet Set" featuring Tai Elton Phillips (Trauma, 2005)
2. "John Doe" by Shade Sheist; featuring DJ Quik, AMG, Hi-C & Swift (Space Boogie: Smoke Oddessey, 2001)
3. "Jupiter's Critic & the Mind of Mars" with Kurupt (BlaQKout, 2009)
4. "Jus Lyke Compton" (Way 2 Fonky, 1992)
5. "Juvenile Committee" by Juvenile Committee; featuring DJ Quik & Playa Hamm (Free Us Colored Kids, 1993)

== K ==
1. "Keep tha "P" In It" featuring Kam, Hi-C, 2nd II None, Playa Hamm & 2-Tone (Safe + Sound, 1995)
2. "Killer Dope" (The Book of David, 2011)

== L ==
1. "L.O.V.E." by Frank Nitt; featuring Yung Berg & DJ Quik (Leaked, 2009)
2. "Ladies & Thugs" featuring Wyclef Jean (Trauma, 2005)
3. "Late Night" by 2Pac; featuring DJ Quik & Outlawz (Better Dayz, 2002)
4. "Let's Make a V" by King Tee; featuring DJ Quik, El DeBarge & Frost (The Kingdom Come, 2004)
5. "Let's Get Down" by Tony! Toni! Toné!; featuring DJ Quik (House of Music, 1996)
6. "Let Me Know" by Hi-C; featuring Fieldy & DJ Quik (House of Music, 1996)
7. "Let Me Rip Tonite" (Way 2 Fonky, 1992)
8. "Let You Havit" (Safe + Sound, 1995)
9. "Like Me" by Kay L; featuring Yung Berg & DJ Quik (Leaked, 2009)
10. "Loked Out Hood" (Quik Is the Name, 1991)
11. "Love Angles Live Trailer" by Ta Smallz; featuring DJ Quik & B-Real (Who Killed My Mama?, 2010)
12. "Like Me" by Kay L; featuring Yung Berg & DJ Quik (Leaked, 2009)
13. "Loyal to the Game (DJ Quik Remix)"; 2Pac featuring Big Syke & DJ Quik (Loyal to the Game, 2004)
14. "Luv of My Life" featuring Gift Reynolds (The Book of David, 2011)

== M ==
1. "Me Wanna Rip Ya Girl" (Way 2 Fonky, 1992)
2. "Medley For A "V" (The Pussy Medley)" featuring Snoop Dogg, Nate Dogg, Hi-C, AMG, 2nd II None & El DeBarge (Rhythm-al-ism, 1998)
3. "Middle" by The Fixxers (Midnight Life, 2007)
4. "Mo' Pussy" (Way 2 Fonky, 1992)
5. "Motex Records I (Interlude)" (Balance & Options, 2000)
6. "Motex Records II (Interlude)" (Balance & Options, 2000)
7. "Murda 1 Case" featuring KK & Pharoahe Monch (Under tha Influence, 2002)

== N ==
1. "Niggaz Still Trippin'" featuring AMG, 2nd II None, Hi-C & JFN (Way 2 Fonky, 1992)
2. "No Bullshit" featuring KK (Way 2 Fonky, 1992)
3. "No Doubt" featuring Playa Hamm & Suga Free (Rhythm-al-ism, 1998)
4. "No More Questions" by Mausberg; featuring DJ Quik (Non-Fiction, 2000)
5. "No Problem (Remix)"; Lil Scrappy featuring DJ Quik (What It Duw, 2006)
6. "Nobody" featuring Suga Free (The Book of David, 2011)
7. "Nothing's Wrong" by Won G.; featuring James DeBarge & DJ Quik (Nothing's Wrong, 2001)

== O ==
1. "Off da Hook" by The Fixxers featuring Twista (Midnight Life, 2007)
2. "Offshore Flow" by The Fixxers (Midnight Life, 2007)
3. "Ohh!" with Kurupt (BlaQKout, 2009)
4. "Oh Well" featuring Will Hudspeth (Under tha Influence, 2002)
5. "One on 1" featuring El DeBarge (Under tha Influence, 2002)
6. "Only Fo' Tha Money" featuring 2nd II None (Way 2 Fonky, 1992)
7. "Out" (Under tha Influence, 2002)

== P ==
1. "P.S. Phuk U 2" by Penthouse Players Clique; featuring DJ Quik & Eazy-E (Paid the Cost, 1992)
2. "Pacific Coast Remix" featuring Ludacris & Kimmi J. (Trauma, 2005)
3. "Pitch In on a Party" (Balance & Options, 2000)
4. "Poppin'" featuring BlaKKazz K.K. (The Book of David, 2011)
5. "Poppin' Off" by Xzibit; featuring DJ Quik & King Tee (Full Circle, 2006)
6. "Problem: The B Stands for Beautiful" with Kurupt featuring Problem (BlaQKout, 2009)
7. "Put It In the Air" by Talib Kweli; featuring DJ Quik (Quality, 2002)
8. "Put It on Me" featuring Dr. Dre & Mimi (Under tha Influence, 2002)

== Q ==
1. "Quik Is the Name" (Quik Is the Name, 1991)
2. "Quik's Groove" (Quik Is the Name, 1991)
3. "Quik'z Groove II [For U 2 Rip 2]" (Way 2 Fonky, 1992)
4. "Quik's Groove III" (Safe + Sound, 1995)
5. "Quik's Groove IV" a.k.a. Reprise (Medley For A "V") ( Rhythm-al-ism, 1998)
6. "Quik's Groove V" (Balance & Options, 2000)
7. "Quik's Groove 6" (Under tha Influence, 2002)
8. "Quik's Groove VII" (The Best of DJ Quik: Da Finale, 2002)
9. "Quik's Groove 7" a.k.a. "Quikstrumental" featuring Jodeci (Trauma, 2005)**
10. "Quik's Groove 9" (The Book of David, 2011)
11. "Quikker Said than Dunn" (Balance & Options, 2000)
- ** "Quik's Groove 7" is really "Quik's Groove 8", but because The Best of DJ Quik: Da Finale wasn't a major album release it continued the numbering pattern as #7 for each major album release. This is noted by how Quik's Groove 9 is on The Book of David, but there's no "Quik's Groove 8" on any major release between the two album)

== R ==
1. "Real Women" featuring Jon B. (The Book of David, 2011)
2. "Rhythm-al-ism (Intro)" (Rhythm-al-ism, 1998)
3. "Rise to Glory" The NFL on CBS
4. "Ridin' (West Coast Remix)"; Chamillionaire featuring DJ Quik & Game (Ridin', 2006)
5. "Roger's Groove" (Balance & Options, 2000)
6. "Run Up Done Up" by Hi-C; featuring DJ Quik (The Hi-Life Hustle, 2003)

== S ==
1. "Safe + Sound" (Safe + Sound, 1995)
2. "Sex Crymee" featuring Will Hudspeth (Under tha Influence, 2002)
3. "Sexuality" (Balance & Options, 2000)
4. "Shine" by Jadakiss; featuring Snoop Dogg & DJ Quik (Kiss of Death, 2004)
5. "Sippi Sippi" by The Fixxers (Midnight Life, 2007)
6. "Skanless" featuring AMG, 2nd II None & Hi-C (Quik Is the Name, 1991)
7. "Smoke II Much" by The Fixxers (Midnight Life, 2007)
8. "So Cold" featuring Butch Cassidy (Unreleased, 2004)
9. "So Compton" featuring BlaKKazz K.K. (The Book of David, 2011)
10. "So Good" by The Fixxers featuring Rich Boy (Midnight Life, 2007)
11. "So Many Wayz" featuring 2nd II None & Peter Gunz (Rhythm-al-ism, 1998)
12. "So Westcoast" by Nick Cannon; featuring DJ Quik (Child of the Corn, 2011)
13. "So Westcoast (Remix)" by Nick Cannon; featuring Snoop Dogg, E-40 & DJ Quik (Child of the Corn, 2011)
14. "Soak Me Baby" by AMG; featuring DJ Quik (Bitch Betta Have My Money 2001, 2000)
15. "Somethin' 4 tha Mood" (Safe + Sound, 1995)
16. "Sorry I'm Away So Much" by Xzibit; featuring DJ Quik & Suga Free (Restless, 2000)
17. "Speak on It" featuring Mausberg & AMG (Balance & Options, 2000)
18. "Speed" (Rhythm-al-ism, 1998)
19. "Spur of the Moment"; Ludacris featuring DJ Quik & Kimmi J. (The Red Light District, 2004)
20. "Straight From the Street (Interlude)" (Balance & Options, 2000)
21. "Strait Playin'" by Shaquille O'Neal; featuring Peter Gunz & DJ Quik (You Can't Stop the Reign, 1996)
22. "Street Level Entrance" (Safe + Sound, 1995)
23. "Sucka Free" featuring Playa Hamm (Safe + Sound, 1995)
24. "Summer Breeze" featuring Dionne Knighton (Safe + Sound, 1995)
  - "Summer Breeze (Remix)" (Unreleased, 1995)
25. "Sweet Black Pussy" (Quik Is the Name, 1991)

== T ==
1. "Tanqueray" (Safe + Sound, 1995)
2. "Tear It Off" featuring AMG (Quik Is the Name, 1991)
3. "Time Iz Money" by Big Syke; featuring E-40 & DJ Quik (Big Syke Daddy, 2001)
4. "Tha Bombudd" (Quik Is the Name, 1991)
5. "Tha Divorce Song" featuring James DeBarge (Balance & Options, 2000)
6. "Tha Ho In You" featuring Hi-C & 2nd II None (Safe + Sound, 1995)
7. "Tha Last Word" (Way 2 Fonky, 1992)
8. "Tha Proem" featuring Hi-C, Talib Kweli & Shyheim (Under tha Influence, 2002)
9. "Tha Truth Is..." by Mausberg; featuring DJ Quik (Non-Fiction, 2000)
10. "The Appeal" with Kurupt (BlaQKout, 2009)
11. "The End?" featuring Garry Shider (The Book of David, 2011)
12. "The Maze" (The Trauma Mixtape, 2005)
13. "There She Goes" by Nate Dogg; featuring DJ Quik & Warren G (Nate Dogg, 2003)
14. "Thinkin' Bout U" (Rhythm-al-ism, 1998)
15. "Til Jesus Comes" (Trauma, 2005)
16. "Time Stands Still" featuring Dwele (The Book of David, 2011)
17. "Tip Toe" by Suga Free; featuring Hi-C & DJ Quik (Street Gospel, 1997)
18. "Tonite" (Quik Is the Name, 1991)
19. "Total Auto" (The Trauma Mixtape, 2005)
20. "Trouble" featuring AMG (Under tha Influence, 2002)
21. "Trust No Bitch" by Penthouse Players Clique; featuring DJ Quik, AMG & Eazy-E (Paid the Cost, 1992)

== U ==
1. "U Ain't Fresh" featuring Erick Sermon & Kam (Balance & Options, 2000)
2. "Up N Da Club" by 2nd II None; featuring AMG & DJ Quik (Classic 220, 1999)

== W ==
1. "Way 2 Fonky" (Way 2 Fonky, 1992)
2. "We Came 2 Play" featuring AMG & James DeBarge (Balance & Options, 2000)
3. "We Still Party" (Rhythm-al-ism, 1998)
4. "Well" featuring Mausberg & Raphael Saadiq (Balance & Options, 2000)
5. "What That Is" by Baby Eagle; featuring DJ Quik (The Death Row Sessions EP, 2008)
6. "What They Think" featuring Nate Dogg (Unreleased, 2004)
7. "Whatcha Wan Do" with Kurupt featuring Problem & Yo-Yo (BlaQKout, 2009)
8. "Whatcha Wan Do (Alternative Mix)" with Kurupt featuring Problem & Yo-Yo (BlaQKout, 2009)
9. "Whateva U Do" (Rhythm-al-ism, 1998)
10. "When You're a Gee" featuring Playa Hamm (Way 2 Fonky, 1992)
11. "Winning" by The Fixxers (Midnight Life, 2007)

== Y ==
1. "You'z a Ganxta" (Rhythm-al-ism, 1998)
