= Greatest Hits: Live at the House of Blues =

Greatest Hits: Live at the House of Blue

Live album by DJ Quik
- Released: 2006
- Genres: West Coast hip hop Gangsta rap
- Label: Profile
- Producer: DJ Quik

DJ Quik chronology
Trauma (2005)	Greatest Hits: Live at the House of Blue (2006)	Midnight Life (2007)

Professional ratings
Review scores
Source	Rating
RapReviews.com	8/10 stars

Greatest Hits: Live at the House of Blues is a live album released by rapper and producer, DJ Quik. It was recorded in February 2006 during a series of sold-out shows, and released later that year. A 'Clean' edition was also released.

== Track listing ==
1. "Intro for Roger"
2. "Mo Pussy"
3. "Jus Lyke Compton"
4. "Trouble"
5. "Pitch In on a Party"
6. "Fandango"
7. "Tha Bombudd"
8. "Sweet Black Pussy"
9. "Get Down"
10. "Down, Down, Down"
11. "Safe & Sound"
12. "Do I Love Her?"
13. "Quik's Groove"
14. "Get Up"
15. "'Til Jesus Comes"
16. "Hand In Hand"
17. "Medley For A V"
18. "We Still Party"
19. "Tonite"
20. "Born and Raised In Compton"
