= The Best of DJ Quik: Da Finale =

Greatest hits album by DJ Quik
- Released: November 19, 2002
- Genre: West Coast hip hop
- Length: 77:46
- Label: Arista
- Producer: DJ Quik (also exec.); G-One

DJ Quik chronology
Under tha Influence (2002)	The Best of DJ Quik: Da Finale (2002)	Trauma (2005)

Professional ratings
Review scores
Source	Rating
AllMusic	4/5 stars
HipHopDX.com	4.5/5

The Best of DJ Quik: Da Finale is a greatest hits album by rapper and producer DJ Quik. The album charted at number 43 of Billboard's Top R&B/Hip-Hop Albums chart.

== Track listing ==
No.	Title	Writer(s)	Producer(s)	Length
1.	"Quik Is The Name (Intro)"	David Blake	DJ Quik	0:35
2.	"Sweet Black Pussy"	Blake; Clarence Reid	DJ Quik	4:20
3.	"Tonite"	Blake; Charlotte Caffey; Peter Case; Jane Wiedlin	DJ Quik	5:23
4.	"Born and Raised In Compton"	Blake	DJ Quik	3:24
5.	"Loked Out Hood"	Blake	DJ Quik	2:50
6.	"Safe + Sound"	George Archie; Blake	DJ Quik; G-One (co.)	4:43
7.	"Dollaz + Sense"	Blake	DJ Quik	5:53
8.	"Summer Breeze"	Blake; Jerome Louis "J.J." Jackson	DJ Quik	4:32
9.	"Quik's Groove VII"	Blake	DJ Quik	3:49
10.	"Jus Lyke Compton"	Rob Bacon; Blake	DJ Quik; Rob "Fonksta" Bacon (co.)	4:10
11.	"So Many Wayz" (featuring 2nd II None & Peter Gunz)	Archie; Darius Barnett; Blake; Kelton McDonald; Peter Pankey	DJ Quik; G-One (co.)	5:39
12.	"Hand In Hand" (featuring 2nd II None & El DeBarge)	Barnett; Blake; Eldra Patrick DeBarge; McDonald	DJ Quik	4:18
13.	"Down, Down, Down" (featuring Suga Free, AMG & Mausberg)	Blake; Johnny Burns; Jason Lewis; Dejuan Walker	DJ Quik	4:43
14.	"You'z a Ganxta"	Blake	DJ Quik	4:22
15.	"Speed"	Blake; Lewis; Maurice White; Verdine White	DJ Quik	3:20
16.	"Pitch in on a Party"	Blake	DJ Quik	4:07
17.	"Do I Love Her?" (featuring Suga Free)	Blake; Walker	DJ Quik	4:11
18.	"Streets Iz Callin'" (featuring Chuckey)	Blake	DJ Quik	3:45
19.	"Trouble" (featuring AMG)	Blake; Lewis	DJ Quik	3:41

• (co.) Co-producer
