= Classic 220 =

Studio album by 2nd II None
- Released: October 12, 1999
- Recorded: 1999
- Genre: West Coast hip hop
- Label: Arista
- Producer: DJ Quik, 2nd II None

2nd II None chronology
2nd II None (1991)	Classic 220 (1999)	Tha Shit (2008)

Singles from Classic 220
- 1. "Up 'n da Club" Released: 1999

Classic 220 is the second album by the West Coast hip hop group 2nd II None. It was released by Arista Records in 1999. The album peaked at No. 162 on the Billboard 200.

== Production ==
The album was produced by DJ Quik and 2nd II None.

== Critical reception ==
Professional ratings
Review scores
Source	Rating
AllMusic	3/5 stars
The Encyclopedia of Popular Music	3/5 stars

AllMusic called the album "an intriguing return to form for a hip-hop crew that never made as many records as they should have."

== Track listing ==
No.	Title	Producer(s)	Length
1.	"Stragglaz"	The Noma	5:00
2.	"Up 'n da Club" (featuring the Fixxers)	DJ Quik	4:54
3.	"Don't U Hide It"	DJ Quik, 2nd II None	5:18
4.	"Whateva U Want" (featuring AMG & James DeBarge)	DJ Quik	4:05
5.	"Make 'Em Understand" (featuring Mausberg)	DJ Quik	4:31
6.	"Pawdy" (featuring Playa Hamm)	Robert Bacon	4:34
7.	"Back Up Off the Wall" (featuring DJ Quik)	DJ Quik	6:07
8.	"Y?"	DJ Quik	4:20
9.	"If U Ain't Fuckin'"	DJ Quik	4:44
10.	"Don't Do Dat"	2nd II None	4:38
11.	"Princess" (featuring James DeBarge)	DJ Quik	4:19
12.	"Love U"	Sean Freehill	3:30
13.	"Got a Nu Woman" (featuring the Fixxers, Hi-C & Playa Hamm)	DJ Quik	8:49

Sample credits

- "Back Up Off the Wall" contains a sample of "Get Down on It" by Kool & the Gang.
- "Y?" contains a sample of "By Your Side" by Con Funk Shun.
- "Princess" contains a sample of "Yesterday Princess" by Stanley Clarke.
