= Greensleeves Rhythm Album 30: Bollywood =

Greensleeves Rhythm Album #30: Bollywood

Compilation album by Various artists
- Released: October 29, 2002
- Recorded: 2002
- Genre: Dancehall
- Label: Greensleeves
- Producer: Bryon Murray; Clifford Smith

Various artists chronology
Sledge (2002)	Greensleeves Rhythm Album #30: Bollywood (2002)	Belly Skin (2002)

Professional ratings
Review scores
Source	Rating
Allmusic	3/5 stars

Greensleeves Rhythm Album #30: Bollywood is an album in Greensleeves Records' rhythm album series. It was released in October 2002 on CD and LP. The album features various artists recorded over the "Bollywood" riddim. The riddim was produced by Byron Murray and Clifford Smith for the In The Streetz label. The riddim is an interpolation of the DJ Quik-produced record Addictive by singer Truth Hurts and samples the song "Thoda Resham Lagta Hai" by Indian singer Lata Mangeshkar.

== Track listing ==
1. "Lock Up" - Capleton
2. "Heat is On" - Sizzla
3. "Girls, Girls" - Lexxus
4. "Dig Up" - Harry Toddler
5. "Addiction" - Tanya Stephens
6. "Red Red" - Beenie Man & Robyn
7. "Hot For Real" - Danny English & Egg Nog
8. "Diggin Me" - Keri
9. "War" - Mr. Vegas
10. "In The Streez Mega Mix" - Elephant Man
11. "Drunken Master" - Future Troubles
12. "More Fire" - Determine
13. "Roll Up" - Ward 21
14. "More Marijuana" - Frisco Kid
15. "Street Thugz" - Alozade
16. "Buss a Shot" - Captain Barkey
17. "Cocky She Want" - Mr. Vegas
18. "Bounce Yuh Girl" - Mr. G
19. "Come Out a Mi Place" - Wickerman
20. "Good O" - Galaxy P
