= Balance & Options =

Studio album by DJ Quik
- Released: May 16, 2000
- Recorded: 1999–2000
- Studio: The Hospital Studio (Los Angeles, California); Skip Sailor Recordings (Los Angeles, California)
- Genre: Hip hop; R&B
- Length: 70:41
- Label: Arista
- Producer: DJ Quik (also exec.); Courtney Branch; Warryn Campbell; G-One

DJ Quik chronology
Rhythm-al-ism (1998)	Balance & Options (2000)	Under tha Influence (2002)

Singles from Balance & Options
- 1. "Pitch in on a Party" Released: October 28, 1999; 2. "Quikker Said than Dunn" Released: December 9, 1999; 3. "Do I Love Her?" Released: 2000

Balance & Options is the fifth album by West Coast rapper and producer, DJ Quik. It was released on May 16, 2000, on Arista Records (who inherited DJ Quik's contract when they bought Profile Records). The album debuted at number 18 on the U.S. Billboard 200 chart, with 68,000 copies in its first-week of sales. It was his first album not certified by the RIAA. It features the single "Pitch in on a Party" whose video was directed by photographer Patrick Hoelck.

== Critical reception ==
Professional ratings
Review scores
Source	Rating
AllMusic	2.5/5 stars
Los Angeles Times	3/4 stars
RapReviews	9/10
Rolling Stone	3.5/5 stars
The Source	3/5 stars
The Village Voice	(3-star Honorable Mention)
USA Today	2.5/4 stars

Balance & Options received positive reviews from contemporary music critics. Joseph Patel, in his review for Rolling Stone, wrote that it "could be the most unexpectedly progressive hip-hop album of the year". Soren Baker, writing for Los Angeles Times, thought that "the music on Balance & Options is among the most innovative and textured hip-hop has to offer", while also commending DJ Quik's lyrics that "show tremendous insight and depth". Steve Juon of RapReviews called it "an A+ summer album to ride to", commending its "excellent guest roster". Steve Jones of USA Today thought the album "pulsates with the kind of woofer-rattling funk you've come to expect from the West Coast", adding that it lacks "surprises or innovation". Vibe's Dimitri Ehrlich thought that DJ Quik "managed to strike a balance between the thuggery of his youth and the peacefulness to which he now aspires".

Ed Rice of The Source wrote: "In days past, Balance & Options would be a respectable offering, but it stumbles against the current field and falls short of the quality of even Quik's last effort." He concluded the review saying that the album's best parts, which show the album's potential, are "scattered like buried treasure, weighing heavily toward the LP's end". Nathan Rabin from The A.V. Club called the album a "mixed bag". He praised it for "moving away from gangsta-oriented lyrics in favor of a more self-consciously 'positive' worldview", but also criticized it for its "rampant misogyny and homophobia", which he found "ideologically troubling" as he believed it does not fit the album's overall feel.

=== Accolades ===
In 2012, Kendrick Lamar included the album on his "Complex Top 25 Favorite Albums" list and wrote that "My homeboy Earl would play that album all day. One of the first songs on there 'I Don't Wanna Party Wit U' is one I could remember that really jumps out to me and really gave me that feel. It was summertime, we was running around and that was always playing."

== Commercial performance ==
The album debuted at number 18 on the Billboard 200 chart and number 5 on the Top R&B/Hip-Hop Albums, selling 68,000 copies in its first week. It spent 13 weeks on the Billboard 200. As of March 21, 2002, the album has sold over 324,000 copies in the United States. It was his first album not certified by the RIAA.

Looking back, DJ Quik said: "Balance & Options was the record that didn't sell as much as the other ones. Music started to change. Downloads came in around that time, that's when the MP3 thing started to explode, more than just Shawn Fanning and Napster. People started stealing music and the business was changing."

== Track listing ==
No.	Title	Writer(s)	Producer(s)	Length
1.	"Change da Game" (featuring Mausberg)	David Blake; Johnny Burns	DJ Quik	4:04
2.	"Did Y'all Feel Dat" (featuring Mausberg & Skaboobie)	Blake; Burns	DJ Quik	3:27
3.	"We Came 2 Play" (featuring AMG & James DeBarge)	Blake; James DeBarge; Jason Lewis	DJ Quik	3:49
4.	"Pitch in on a Party"	Blake	DJ Quik	4:06
5.	"I Don't Wanna Party wit U"	Blake	DJ Quik	5:06
6.	"Motex Records I (Interlude)"	Blake	DJ Quik	1:43
7.	"Sexuality"	Blake	DJ Quik	4:03
8.	"How Come?"	Blake	DJ Quik	3:53
9.	"U Ain't Fresh" (featuring Erick Sermon & Kam)	Blake; Joe Malloy; Craig Miller; Erick Sermon; Rudy Sheriff; William Stroman	DJ Quik	3:54
10.	"Roger's Groove"	Blake	DJ Quik	2:48
11.	"Motex Records II (Interlude)"	Blake	DJ Quik	0:36
12.	"Quikker Said Than Dunn"	Andre Young; Blake; Antoine Carraby; Eddie Floyd; O'Shea Jackson; Rahiem Thomas; Eric Wright	DJ Quik	3:44
13.	"Straight from the Streets (Interlude)"	Blake	DJ Quik	1:30
14.	"Speak on It" (featuring AMG & Mausberg)	Blake; Burns; Lewis	DJ Quik	2:32
15.	"Do Whatcha Want" (featuring Digital Underground & AMG)	Blake; Ron Brooks; Ronnie Caldwell; Ben Cauley; Gregory Jacobs; Lewis	DJ Quik	5:08
16.	"Well" (featuring Mausberg & Raphael Saadiq)	Blake; Courtney Branch; Burns; Warryn Campbell; Charles Wiggins	DJ Quik; Warryn Campbell (co.); Courtney Branch (co.)	5:42
17.	"Quik's Groove V"	Blake	DJ Quik	4:58
18.	"Do I Love Her?" (featuring Suga Free)	Blake; Dejuan Walker	DJ Quik	4:00
19.	"Tha Divorce Song" (featuring James DeBarge)	George Archie; Blake; DeBarge	DJ Quik; G-One (co.)	3:33
20.	"Balance & Options (Outro)"	Blake	DJ Quik	1:08
Total length:				70:41

Note

- • (co.) Co-producer

Sample credits

- "Pitch In Ona Party" contains sample of "We Still Party" - earlier Quik's track, from his previous album, Rhythm-al-ism.
- "You Ain't Fresh" contains portions of "You Ain't Fresh" by Boogie Boys.
- "Quikker Said Than Dunn" contains samples of "Eazy-er Said Than Dunn" by Eazy-E.
- "Do Whatcha Want" contains samples of "Let's Have Some Fun" by the Bar-Kays.

== Personnel ==
Credits for Balance & Options adapted from AllMusic.

- AMG – performer, primary artist
- Courtney Branch – performer, primary artist
- El DeBarge – guest artist, vocals
- James DeBarge – performer, primary artist
- Digital Underground – performer, primary artist
- DJ Quik – bass, featured artist, guest artist, performer, primary artist
- Brian Gardner – mastering
- Will Hudspeth – featured artist
- Kam – featured artist
- Jonathan Mannion – photography
- Marco Polo – background vocals
- Mausberg – performer, primary artist
- Raphael Saadiq – featured artist, primary artist
- Erick Sermon – performer, primary artist
- Skaboobie – featured artist
- Suga Free – performer, primary artist
- Charles Veal – concert master
- Courtney Walter – design
- Warryn Campbell – producer
- Benjamin Wright – orchestral arrangements

== Charts ==
Chart (2000)	Peak position
US Billboard 200	18
US Top R&B/Hip-Hop Albums	5
