= Hi-C (rapper, born 1973) =

American rapper

- Also known as: Crawf Dog
- Born: Crawford Wilkerson; December 7, 1973 (age 52)
- Origin: Compton, California, U.S.
- Genre: Hip-hop
- Occupations: Rapper; singer
- Years active: 1989–present

Crawford Wilkerson (born December 7, 1973) better known by his stage name Hi-C, is an American rapper from Compton, California. He is known for his collaborations with DJ Quik, AMG and 2nd II None. He was also a member of the Tree Top Piru.

== Discography ==
=== Studio albums ===
- Skanless (1991)
- Swing'n (1993)
- The Hi-Life Hustle (2003)

=== Singles ===
Title	Release	Album
"I'm Not Your Puppet"	1991	Skanless
"Leave My Curl Alone"	1992	Skanless
"Sitting in the Park"	1992	Skanless
"Got It Like That"	1993	Swing'n
"Let Me Know"	2003	The Hi-Life Hustle
"Steez"	2004	The Hi-Life Hustle

=== Soundtrack appearances ===
Year	Album
1992	Encino Man
1992	South Central
1993	CB4
1999	Deep Blue Sea
2003	Malibu's Most Wanted
2003	Head of State

=== Guest appearances ===
Year	Song	Artist	Other featured performers	Album
1991	"Skanless"	DJ Quik	AMG & 2nd II None	Quik Is the Name
1991	"Comin' Like This"	2nd II None	DJ Quik & AMG	2nd II None
1991	"Niggaz Trippin'"	2nd II None	DJ Quik & AMG	2nd II None
1992	"Another One Bites The Dust (Chyskillz Remix)"	Queen	Ice Cube, Chyskillz	BASIC Queen Bootlegs
1992	"Niggaz Still Trippin'"	DJ Quik	2nd II None, AMG, Hi-C & JFN	Way 2 Fonky
1995	"The Ho in You"	DJ Quik	2nd II None	Safe + Sound
1995	"Keep Tha P In It"	DJ Quik	Playa Hamm, Kam, & 2nd II None	Safe + Sound
1997	"Tip Toe"	Suga Free	DJ Quik	Street Gospel
1998	"Medley For A "V" (The Pussy Medley)"	DJ Quik	Snoop Dogg, Nate Dogg, AMG, El DeBarge & 2nd II None	Rhythm-al-ism
1998	"Get 2Getha Again"	DJ Quik	AMG, El DeBarge & 2nd II None	Rhythm-al-ism
1999	"Got a Nu Woman"	2nd II None	DJ Quik, AMG & Playa Hamm	Classic 220
2000	"In My Face"	Various	Xzibit	The Konnectid Project, Vol. 1
2000	"I Wanna See"	Various	DJ Quik	The Konnectid Project, Vol. 1
2000	"I Can Feel That"	Mausberg	AMG	Non Fiction
2002	"Tha Proem"	DJ Quik	Talib Kweli & Shyheim	Under tha Influence
2002	"Birdz & da Beez"	DJ Quik	AMG	Under tha Influence
2004	"Pay Me"	Suga Free		The New Testament (The Truth)

== Filmography ==
- Dead Homiez (1996)
- Malibu's Most Wanted (2003)
