= Rhythm-al-ism =

Studio album by DJ Quik
- Released: November 24, 1998
- Studio: Skip Saylor Recording (Los Angeles)
- Genre: Hip hop; R&B
- Length: 70:10
- Label: Profile; Arista
- Producer: DJ Quik (exec.); Sheppard Lane (also exec.); G-One

DJ Quik chronology
Safe + Sound (1995)	Rhythm-al-ism (1998)	Balance & Options (2000)

Singles from Rhythm-al-ism
- 1. "You'z a Ganxta" Released: July 14, 1998; 2. "Hand in Hand" Released: September 29, 1998; 3. "Down, Down, Down" Released: December 22, 1998

Rhythm-al-ism is the fourth studio album by American West Coast hip hop recording artist and producer DJ Quik, released on November 24, 1998, by Arista Records and was certified Gold by the RIAA on July 7, 1999. It peaked at number 63 on the US Billboard 200 chart. He recorded the album at Skip Sailor Recordings in Los Angeles, and worked with producer G-One. The album featured the singles "You'z a Ganxta", "Hand In Hand" featuring 2nd II None & El DeBarge, and "Down, Down, Down" featuring Suga Free, Mausberg & AMG.

== Background and recording ==
In an interview with Complex, DJ Quik spoke on the background and recording process of Rhythm-al-ism stating, “With the Rhythm-al-ism album, even though it didn't have a home because Profile Records was going through something and I was fighting them for back royalties and they had me on suspension because they didn't want to pay me. I understood, those were some big checks, I wouldn't want to pay DJ Quik either. "I think that's when I lost my rough edges, I lost the gangster and became like an R&B pretty boy. "The name Rhythm-al-ism alone tells you what I was doing. I was mixing up rhythms. I was meshing R&B with hip-hop and jazz. And a little bit of comedy".

The cover art and some aspects of the album were inspired by L.A. rock band the Doors, confirmed by Quik himself via Instagram.

== Critical reception ==
Professional ratings
Review scores
Source	Rating
AllMusic	2.5/5 stars
Los Angeles Times	3/4 stars
RapReviews	9/10
The Source	4/5 stars
USA Today	3/4 stars

Rhythm-al-ism received mixed reviews from contemporary music critics. AllMusic wrote, "Considering its guest list—packed with enough star power (El DeBarge, Snoop Dogg, Nate Dogg, Peter Gunz, Hi-C, AMG, and 2nd II None) to fill a 'Wrestlemania' card—Rhythm-al-ism promises more than it actually delivers." Soren Baker of the Los Angeles Times felt that DJ Quik delivered "his richest music to date", saying the vibrant production makes the "explicit sexual romps" more friendly and wholesome than other rap acts' "menacing and evil" tales, concluding that "the music is so enjoyable, it's easy to overlook the collection's clever wordplay." Pedro 'DJ Complejo' Hernandez of RapReviews said the record "exhibits all the characteristics that make Quik the underground star he is. It's a recommended addition to anybody's collection and a testament to the fact that though outshined by its East Coast counterparts at times, the West Coast keeps partying as strong as ever."

=== Accolades ===
In 2012, Kendrick Lamar included the album on his "Complex Top 25 Favorite Albums" list and wrote that: "'Down, Down, Down,' that used to be crazy. I came across this record in middle school. Middle school, just playing 'Down, Down, Down' all day. Going on the bus and bumping that. 'Speed' was crazy, 'Hand In Hand.' 'Speed' was crazy. The interlude was crazy too, he always has a lot of crazy interludes." In 2025, Pitchfork placed it at number 34 on their list of the "100 Best Rap Albums of All Time". The website's writer Joshua Minsoo Kim said that while DJ Quik "raps on here like your impish best friend, Rhythm-al-ism's hedonistic celebrations feel urgent, valorizing that most important thing in life: having a good time."

== Commercial performance ==
The album debuted at number sixty three on the US Billboard 200 and spent 29 weeks on the chart. It also debuted at number thirteen on the US Top R&B/Hip-Hop Albums charts and spent 39 weeks on the chart as well. The album was certified Gold on July 27, 1999, by the RIAA for selling over 500,000 copies.

== Track listing ==
No.	Title	Writer(s)	Producer(s)	Length
1.	"Rhythm-al-ism (Intro)"	David Blake	DJ Quik	1:40
2.	"We Still Party"	Blake	DJ Quik	5:13
3.	"So Many Wayz" (featuring 2nd II None and Peter Gunz)	George Archie; Darius Barnett; Blake; Kelton L. McDonald; Peter Pankey	DJ Quik; G-One (co.)	5:41
4.	"Hand in Hand" (featuring 2nd II None & El DeBarge)	Barnett; Blake; Eldra Patrick DeBarge; McDonald	DJ Quik	4:18
5.	"Down, Down, Down" (featuring Suga Free, AMG & Mausberg)	Blake; Johnny Burns; Jason Lewis; Dejuan Walker	DJ Quik	4:43
6.	"You'z a Ganxta"	Blake	DJ Quik	4:21
7.	"I Useta Know Her" (featuring AMG)	Blake; Lewis	DJ Quik	3:50
8.	"No Doubt" (featuring Playa Hamm & Suga Free)	Blake; Wilbert Milo; Walker	DJ Quik	4:12
9.	"Speed"	Blake; Lewis; Maurice White; Verdine White	DJ Quik	3:20
10.	"Whateva U Do"	Archie; Blake; Smokey Robinson	DJ Quik; G-One (co.)	7:47
11.	"Thinkin' Bout U"	Blake	DJ Quik	4:04
12.	"El's Interlude" (featuring El DeBarge)	Blake; DeBarge	DJ Quik	4:06
13.	"Medley for a "V" (The Pussy Medley)" (featuring Snoop Dogg, Nate Dogg, Hi-C, 2nd II None, AMG & El DeBarge)	Archie; Barnett; Blake; Calvin Broadus; DeBarge; Nathaniel Hale; Lewis; McDonald; Crawford Wilkerson	DJ Quik; G-One (co.)	6:26
14.	"Bombudd II"	Blake	DJ Quik	2:59
15.	"Get 2Getha Again" (featuring 2nd II None, AMG, Hi-C & El DeBarge)	Barnett; Blake; DeBarge; Lewis; McDonald; Wilkerson	DJ Quik	4:40
16.	"Reprise (Medley for a "V")"	Archie; Blake	DJ Quik; G-One (co.)	2:40
Total length:				70:10

• (co.) Co-producer

Sample credits

- "We Still Party" contains samples of "Verb: That's What's Happening" by Zachary Sanders.
- "Down, Down, Down" contains a sample of "So Fine" by Howard Johnson.
- "I Useta Know Her" contains a sample of "Flash Light (Extended)" by Parliament.
- "Speed" contains samples of "Mom" by Earth, Wind & Fire, "Rapper Dapper Snapper" by Edwin Birdsong and "You and Love Are the Same" by the Grassroots.
- "Whateva U Do" contains a sample of "So in Love" by Smokey Robinson.
- "You'z a Ganxta" contains a sample of "Rapper's Delight" by Sugarhill Gang.
- "Get 2Getha Again" contains a sample of "Do It, Fluid" by the Blackbyrds.

== Personnel ==
Credits for Rhythm-al-ism adapted from liner notes.

- 2nd II None – performer, primary artist
- AMG – performer, primary artist
- Del Atkins – bass
- Robert Bacon – guitar
- Agnes Baddoo – stylist
- Kenneth Crouch – fender rhodes, piano
- El DeBarge – guest artist, performer, primary artist
- Dee – background vocals
- DJ Quik – bass, drums, executive producer, mixing, percussion, primary artist, producer, synthesizer
- Sheppard Lane – executive producer
- Nate Dogg – guest artist
- Charles Green – horn
- Bernie Grundman – mastering
- Peter Gunz – guest artist, performer, primary artist
- Playa Hamm – guest artist, performer, primary artist
- Anthony Harrison, Jr. – art direction
- Hi-C – guest artist, performer, primary artist
- Stan Jones – guitar
- Dionne Knighton – background vocals
- Mausberg – guest artist, primary artist
- Eric McCaine – percussion
- Chris Puram – assistant engineer
- Snoop Dogg – guest artist, performer, primary artist
- Suga Free – guest artist, performer, primary artist
- Ron Townsend – flute
- Marvin Watkins – guitar
- Michael Wong – photography

== Charts ==
Chart (1998)	Peak position
US Billboard 200	63
US Top R&B/Hip-Hop Albums	13

=== Year-end charts ===
Chart (1999)	Position
US Billboard Top R&B/Hip-Hop Albums	61

=== Singles ===
Song	Chart (1998–99)	Peak position
"You'z a Ganxta"	US Billboard Hot R&B Airplay	66
"You'z a Ganxta"	US Billboard Hot R&B/Hip-Hop Songs	59
"Hand in Hand"	US Billboard Hot R&B Airplay	54
"Hand in Hand"	US Billboard Hot R&B/Hip-Hop Songs	66
"Hand in Hand"	US Billboard Rhythmic Top 40	38
"Down, Down, Down"	US Billboard Hot R&B Airplay	51
"Down, Down, Down"	US Billboard Hot R&B/Hip-Hop Songs	59

== Certifications ==
Region	Certification	Certified units/sales
United States (RIAA)	Gold	500,000^{^}
^{^} Shipments figures based on certification alone.

== Release history ==
Region	Date	Label	Format
United States	November 10, 1998	Arista Records	CD, Cassette, LP
Canada	November 23, 1998	Arista Records	CD, Cassette
United Kingdom	November 24, 1998	Arista Records	CD, Cassette
