= Ballin' Outta Control =

Studio album by AMG
- Released: June 6, 1995
- Recorded: 1994–95
- Studio: Kiva West Studios (Encino, CA)
- Genre: Dirty rap
- Label: Select
- Producer: AMG

AMG chronology
Bitch Betta Have My Money (1992)	Ballin' Outta Control (1995)	Bitch Betta Have My Money 2001 (2000)

Singles from Ballin' Outta Control
- 1. "Butt Booty Naked" Released: May 3, 1994; 2. "Around the World" Released: May 2, 1995

Professional ratings
Review scores
Source	Rating
AllMusic	2.5/5 stars
The Source	3.5/5 stars

Ballin' Outta Control is the second full-length studio album by American rapper AMG. It was released on June 6, 1995 via Select Records. Recording sessions took place at Kiva West Studios in Encino, Los Angeles. Produced entirely by AMG himself, it featured guest appearance from Pee Bee Flexzure. The album debuted at number 100 on the Billboard 200 and number 22 on the Top R&B/Hip-Hop Albums chart in the United States. It was preceded by two singles: "Butt Booty Naked" and "Around the World".

== Track listing ==
No.	Title	Writer(s)	Length
1.	"Pimp of the Century"	Jason A. Lewis	3:46
2.	"304 Thang"	Jason A. Lewis	4:23
3.	"Leather and Wood"	Jason A. Lewis	3:56
4.	"A Playerz Analysis"	Lewis; Terence Kirkland	0:52
5.	"Be Mai Bitch"	Lewis; "T-Bone" Williams; Malik H. Miller	5:30
6.	"Baby Is It Maybe?"	Jason A. Lewis	4:03
7.	"Around the World"	Jason A. Lewis	4:09
8.	"Sucka for Luv"	Jason A. Lewis	4:30
9.	"The Fly Way"	Lewis; Williams; R. Sherrer	4:33
10.	"Butt Booty Naked" (featuring Pee Bee Flexzure)	Lewis; Miller	3:57
11.	"Ballin' Outta Control"	Lewis; Williams	5:26

Sample credits

- Track 3 contains a sample of "Juicy Fruit" by Mtume.
- Track 7 contains portions of "What Would I Do If I Could Feel" (Smalls) from The Wiz and portions of "The Show" by Doug E. Fresh.
- Track 8 contains portions of "Close The Door" written by Gamble and Huff and performed by Teddy Pendergrass.

== Personnel ==
- Jason "AMG" Lewis – vocals, producer, mixing, sleeve notes
- Pee Bee Flexzure – featured artist (track 10)
- Howard Willing – engineering, mixing
- Herb Powers – mastering
- Michael Miller – photography
- Benny Glickman – management
- Cheryl Dickerson – management
- Mark J. Cheatham – booking

== Charts ==
Chart (1995)	Peak position
US Billboard 200	100
US Top R&B/Hip-Hop Albums (Billboard)	22
