= Pitch In on a Party =

Single by DJ Quik

from the album Balance & Options
- Released: October 28, 1999
- Genre: G-funk
- Length: 4:06
- Label: Arista
- Songwriter: David Blake
- Producer: DJ Quik

DJ Quik singles chronology
"Down, Down, Down" (1998)	"Pitch In on a Party" (1999)	"Quikker Said Than Dunn" (1999)

Music video
- "Pitch in on a Party" on YouTube

"Pitch In on a Party" is a song by American rapper and producer DJ Quik, released as the first single from his fifth studio album Balance & Options.

== Track listings ==
U.S. CD Single

1. "Pitch In ona Party" (Radio Mix) – 3:58
2. "Pitch In ona Party" (Instrumental) – 3:58
3. "Call Out Research Hook" – 0:10

U.S. Promo Vinyl

1. "Pitch In ona Party" (Club Mix) – 4:07
2. "Pitch In ona Party" (Acapella) – 3:23
3. "Do I Love Her?" (feat. Suga Free) (Acapella) – 4:15

== Charts ==
Chart (2000)	Peak position
U.S. Billboard Hot R&B/Hip-Hop Airplay	60
U.S. Billboard Hot R&B/Hip-Hop Songs	68
