= Under tha Influence =

Studio album by DJ Quik
- Released: June 4, 2002
- Recorded: 2001–2002
- Genre: Hip hop
- Length: 66:12
- Label: Ark 21; Bungalo; Universal
- Producer: DJ Quik (also exec.); Dr. Dre

DJ Quik chronology
Balance & Options (2000)	Under tha Influence (2002)	The Best of DJ Quik: Da Finale (2002)

Singles from Under tha Influence
- 1. "Put It on Me" Released: August 6, 2001; 2. "Trouble" Released: April 25, 2002

Under tha Influence is the sixth album by rapper/producer DJ Quik. It was released on June 4, 2002, on Ark 21 and was his first album to be released on an independent record label. The album included the singles "Trouble", featuring AMG, and "Put It on Me", featuring Dr. Dre. The album debuted at twenty seven on the U.S. Billboard 200 chart, with 41,000 sold in its first-week.

== Reception ==
=== Critical response ===
Professional ratings
Review scores
Source	Rating
AllMusic	4/5 stars
RapReviews	9/10
The Source	4/5 stars
Vibe	3/5 stars

- AllMusic - "DJ Quik still sounds a bit ordinary as a rapper, but his production work here is nothing short of amazing and amazingly varied. The result is his best work in years -- perhaps even his most accomplished work to date."
- RapReviews - "By turns humerous, [sic] clever, hardcore and smooth, the ubiquitous Quik never runs out of ammunition in his glock, his beats OR his raps."
- Vibe - "A case study in high-energy rap. Undeniable street cred and gritty production values combine to make UNDER THA INFLUENCE yet another successful stage in this veteran performer's career."

== Track listing ==
All tracks are produced by DJ Quik, except for "Put It on Me", which is produced by Dr. Dre.

No.	Title	Writer(s)	Length
1.	"Tha Proem" (featuring Hi-C, Talib Kweli & Shyheim)	David Blake; Shyheim Franklin; Talib Greene; Crawford Wilkerson	5:09
2.	"Trouble" (featuring AMG)	Blake; Jason Lewis	3:40
3.	"Come 2Nyte" (featuring Truth Hurts)	Blake; Shari Watson	4:09
4.	"Put It on Me" (featuring Dr. Dre & Mimi)	Blake; Royal Harbor; Andre Young	5:00
5.	"Murda 1 Case" (featuring KK & Pharoahe Monch)	Blake; Troy Jamerson; Kelton McDonald	3:38
6.	"Ev'ryday" (featuring Hi-C & James DeBarge)	Blake; James DeBarge; Wilkerson	3:21
7.	"Get Loaded" (featuring AMG)	Blake; Lewis	4:45
8.	"Gina Statuatorre" (featuring Chuckey)	Blake	3:52
9.	"50 Ways" (featuring Wanya Morris)	Blake; Wanya Morris; Phil Ramone; Paul Simon	3:39
10.	"Quik's Groove 6"	Blake	4:12
11.	"Get tha Money" (featuring Suga Free)	Blake; Dejuan Walker	2:43
12.	"One on 1"	Blake	3:00
13.	"Sex Crymee"	Blake	3:33
14.	"Birdz & da Beez" (featuring Hi-C & AMG)	Blake; Lewis; Wilkerson	3:46
15.	"Oh Well/Out"	Blake	11:35

Sample credits

- "50 Ways" contains samples of "50 Ways to Leave Your Lover" by Paul Simon.

== Charts ==
Chart (2002)	Peak position
US Billboard 200	27
US Top R&B/Hip-Hop Albums	7
