= Midnight Life =

Studio album by The Fixxers
- Released: Shelved, 2007
- Recorded: 2006–2007
- Genre: Hip hop; snap; crunk
- Label: Interscope; Dirty West
- Producer: The Fixxers (exec.); AMG; DJ Quik; Pop Traxxx

The Fixxers chronology
Midnight Life (2007)	Street Masterpiece (2008)

Singles from The Fixxers
- 1. "Can U Werk Wid Dat" Released: March 27, 2007

Midnight Life is a shelved studio album by hip hop duo The Fixxers that was set to be released December 7, 2007.

== Background ==
When Quik was released from a prison sentence for parole violation, he decided to form the duo with longtime friend AMG. The group's name was chosen by AMG and Quik's manager Greedy Greg, and in their own words refers to their desire to "fix music" - "We're fixing music out here. We're interchanging our LA people. Right now. Where it was all dry before, we're giving them a breath of fresh air that's homegrown" - Quik. The group's debut album, Midnight Life, was supposed to be released in 2007, but never received a physical release; It was sold via the MySpace page of the Secret Music Group, with Quik claiming this was an unauthorized, unfinished version of the album, sold by a former business partner who had hacked Quik's MySpace to make the release look official.

== Single ==
The group signed a singles deal with Interscope Records after their track "Can U Werk Wit Dat" received regular airplay on Los Angeles radio, the label going on to release it as a single. It was chosen as number 22 on Vibe's "44 Best Songs of 2007". The single became a favorite on LA radio stations and was featured on the HBO TV show Entourage. It also featured on several Billboard charts: #7 on the Bubbling Under Hot 100 Singles chart, #20 on the Hot Rap Tracks chart, #21 on the Rhythmic Top 40 chart, and #74 on the Hot R&B/Hip-Hop Airplay chart.

== Track listing ==
(as released on iTunes)

No.	Title	Length
1.	"Worldwide Am"	3:55
2.	"Off Tha Hook" (featuring Twista)	4:42
3.	"Can You Werk Wit Dat"	3:04
4.	"Dough"	4:03
5.	"The Middle"	4:23
6.	"So Good" (featuring Rich Boy)	4:45
7.	"Winnin'"	3:56
8.	"Smoke 2 Much"	4:02
9.	"U Need A Drink"	4:20
10.	"Do It Like Me" (featuring Yung Berg))	4:14
11.	"Sippy Sippy"	2:29
12.	"V.I.P." (featuring Frankie J & Amazin')	4:33
13.	"Offshore Flow" (featuring Don Quon)	3:35
14.	"Can U Werk Wit Dat (Remix)" (featuring Jim Jones (rapper))	4:20
