= Hand in Hand (DJ Quik song) =

Single by DJ Quik featuring 2nd II None & El DeBarge

from the album Rhythm-al-ism
- Released: September 29, 1998
- Genre: Hip hop; R&B
- Length: 4:18
- Label: Arista
- Songwriters: Darius Barnett; David Blake; Eldra Patrick DeBarge; Kelton L. McDonald
- Producer: DJ Quik

DJ Quik singles chronology
"Way 2 Fonky" (1992)	"Hand in Hand" (1998)	"Down, Down, Down" (1998)

Music video
- "Hand in Hand" on YouTube

"Hand In Hand" is a song by American rapper and producer DJ Quik, released as the second single from his fourth studio album Rhythm-al-ism (1998). The song features additional vocals from fellow rap duo 2nd II None and American singer El Debarge.

In the song, DJ Quik momentarily pays homage to the Almond Joy jingle "Sometimes You Feel Like a Nut", written by Leo Corday and Leon Carr.

== Track listings ==
CD single

1. "Hand In Hand" (Radio Mix) (featuring 2nd II None & El DeBarge) – 4:20
2. "Hand In Hand" (Instrumental) – 4:20
3. "Hand In Hand" (Call Out Research Hook) – 0:10

== Music video ==
The music video has cameos of actresses Nadine Velazquez and Shannyn Sossamon.

== Charts ==
Chart (1998–1999)	Peak position
US Billboard Hot R&B Airplay	54
US Hot R&B Singles	66
US Rhythmic Top 40	38
