= Bitch Betta Have My Money 2001 =

Studio album by AMG
- Released: December 5, 2000
- Genre: Dirty rap
- Label: Lightyear
- Producers: AMG; The Noma; DJ Quik; Bosko; Rhythum D; The Original Crew; Maddball Tony D

AMG chronology
Ballin' Outta Control (1995)	Bitch Betta Have My Money 2001 (2000)

Professional ratings
Review scores
Source	Rating
AllMusic	link

Bitch Betta Have My Money 2001 is the third studio album by American rapper AMG. It was released on December 5, 2000, by Lightyear Records.

== Track listing ==
1. "Bitch 2001"
2. "Jack Off" (featuring Jiboh)
3. "Perfection"
4. "Soak Me Baby" (featuring DJ Quik)
5. "She's Paid" (featuring Dru Down, Bosko)
6. "All Over U"
7. "Pimp the World"
8. "Reallionaire.com"
9. "Bounce"
10. "Come Inside" (featuring Paperboy)
11. "F.M.S.M. 2" (featuring LQ, Jiboh)
12. "Yo Luv"
