= Paid the Cost =

Studio album by Penthouse Players Clique
- Released: April 28, 1992
- Recorded: 1991–1992
- Studios: Skip Saylor Recording, Studio A (Los Angeles, CA); Audio Achievements (Torrance, CA)
- Genre: Hip hop
- Labels: Ruthless; Priority
- Producers: DJ Quik; Penthouse Players Clique; DJ Battlecat

Singles from Paid the Cost
- 1. "Explanation of a Playa" Released: 1992; 2. "Trust No Bitch" Released: 1992; 3. "P.S. Phuk U 2" Released: 1992

Paid the Cost is the only studio album by American rap duo Penthouse Players Clique. It was released on April 28, 1992, via Ruthless Records and Priority Records.

The recording sessions for the album took place at Skip Saylor Recording Studio A in Los Angeles, with additional recording at Audio Achievements in Torrance, California. The album was produced by DJ Quik, except for two tracks that were produced by the Penthouse Players Clique themselves and DJ Battlecat. The album peaked at number 76 on the Billboard 200, number 28 on the Top R&B/Hip-Hop Albums and number one on the Heatseekers Albums charts. Three singles were released, "Explanation of a Playa", "Trust No Bitch" which featured Quik, Eazy-E and AMG, and "P.S. Phuk U 2", however only "Explanation of a Playa" would make it to the Billboard charts. "Explanation of a Playa" and "P.S. Phuk U 2" both had music videos, with the former featuring cameos from Eazy, Quik, AMG and MC Ren while the latter also featured cameos from Eazy and Quik. This would mark the duos' only album as they would disband a year later. The single "Trust No Bitch" later appeared on the platinum selling compilation album The N.W.A Legacy, Vol. 1: 1988–1998.

== Critical reception ==
Professional ratings
Review scores
Source	Rating
AllMusic	2/5 stars
Entertainment Weekly	C

Alex Henderson of AllMusic wrote that "the Penthouse Players didn't record this album to please hip-hop's intelligentsia. Paid the Cost isn't remarkable, although it's sometimes amusing and fun if you have a taste for off-color humor." James Bernard of Entertainment Weekly critiqued that the record's attempt to "match the pimp-daddy swagger" of Eazy E and DJ Quik comes across "sounding more eager than convincing", and that the latter's "exciting burst of vocal energy" makes listeners more excited for his next record.

== Track listing ==
No.	Title	Producer(s)	Length
1.	"N-Trance"	DJ Quik	0:54
2.	"Undaground Boss"	Penthouse Players Clique	5:20
3.	"Chekmate"	DJ Quik	5:01
4.	"Trust No Bitch" (featuring AMG, DJ Quik and Eazy-E)	DJ Quik	5:01
5.	"U Cain't Check Me"	DJ Quik	2:28
6.	"Jealous Knukle Heads"	DJ Quik	0:59
7.	"Jus 2 Kep Yo Attenchun" (featuring D-Nasty)	Penthouse Players Clique; DJ Battlecat	4:38
8.	"P.L.F."	DJ Quik	4:13
9.	"Blak Iz a Poet"	DJ Quik	5:35
10.	"Explanation of a Playa"	DJ Quik	4:28
11.	"They Don't Know"	DJ Quik	3:51
12.	"Nathen's Changed"	DJ Quik	4:36
13.	"P.S. Phuk U 2" (featuring DJ Quik and Eazy-E)	DJ Quik	3:23
14.	"Smooth"	DJ Quik	5:16
15.	"Handle Yo Bizness"	DJ Quik	2:24
16.	"Pimp Lane"	DJ Quik	3:32
17.	"X-It"	DJ Quik	0:54
Total length:			1:02:33

- Tracks 1 and 17 contains elements from "Introducing the Players" by Ohio Players
- Track 2 contains elements from "The Boss" by James Brown
- Track 3 contains elements from "Life of Fortune & Fame" by Sly Stone and "I'm the One" by Average White Band
- Track 4 contains elements from "Funky Worm" by Ohio Players, "Feel Good" by Fancy and "Just Ain't Me" by 2nd II None
- Track 5 contains elements from "Can You Feel It" by the Voices of East Harlem and "God Make Me Funky" by the Headhunters & Pointer Sisters
- Track 7 contains elements from "Knucklehead" by Grover Washington Jr. and "Convoy" by Blowfly
- Track 8 contains elements from "Pimpin', Leaning', and Feanin'" by the Watts Prophets and "Four Play" by Fred Wesley & the Horny Horns
- Track 9 contains elements from "I Know You Got Soul" by Bobby Byrd, "Fool's Paradise" by The Sylvers, "Impeach the President" by the Honey Drippers and "Funky President" by James Brown
- Track 10 contains elements from "N.T." by Kool & the Gang, "Fool Yourself" by Little Feat and "Peter Piper" by Run-DMC
- Track 11 contains elements from "Who Knows" by Jimi Hendrix
- Track 12 contains elements from "When the Levee Breaks" by Led Zeppelin
- Track 13 contains elements from "Synthetic Substitution" by Melvin Bliss, "Wino Dealing With Dracula" by Richard Pryor and "The Breakdown (Part II)" by Rufus Thomas
- Track 14 contains elements from "So I Can Love You" by the Emotions
- Track 15 contains elements from "Sunday and Sister Jones" by Roberta Flack
- Track 16 contains elements from "Who'd She Coo?" by Ohio Players

== Personnel ==
- Wilbert Bryan Milo – main artist, producer (tracks: 2, 7)
- Tweed Cadillac – main artist, producer (tracks: 2, 7)
- David Marvin Blake – featured artist (tracks: 4, 13), producer
- Eric Wright – featured artist (track 4, track 13), executive producer
- Jason Lewis – featured artist (track 4)
- D-Nasty – vocals (track 7)
- Malik – additional vocals (track 14)
- Kevin Gilliam – scratches & producer (track 7)
- Robert "Fonksta" Bacon – keyboards (track 5), guitar & bass
- Stan "The Guitar Man" Jones – guitar & bass (track 11)
- Mike "Crazy Neck" Sims – additional guitar (track 12)
- Louie Teran – engineering
- Donovan "The Dirtbiker" Smith – engineering
- Brian Knapp Gardner – mastering
- Mark Machado – artwork
- Dino Paredes – design
- Dean Karr – photography

== Charts ==
Chart (1992)	Peak position
US Billboard 200	76
US Top R&B/Hip-Hop Albums (Billboard)	28
US Heatseekers Albums (Billboard)	1
