= The Midnight Life =

Studio album by DJ Quik
- Released: October 14, 2014
- Recorded: July 2013–July 2014
- Genre: Hip hop
- Length: 59:15
- Labels: Mad Science; INgrooves Music Group
- Producer: DJ Quik (also exec.)

DJ Quik chronology
The Book of David (2011)	The Midnight Life (2014)	Rosecrans (2017)

Singles from The Midnight Life
- 1. "Life Jacket" Released: September 24, 2014; 2. "Pet Semetery" Released: September 30, 2014

The Midnight Life is the ninth studio album by American rapper DJ Quik. The album was released on October 14, 2014, by Mad Science Recordings and INgrooves Music Group.

The album spawned the singles "Life Jacket" and promo single "That Getter". The Midnight Life features guest appearances from Mack 10, El DeBarge, David Blake II, Bishop Lamont, Joi, Rob "Fonsksta" Bacon, Suga Free, Tay F 3rd Tweed Cadillac & Dom Kennedy. The album's production was handled mainly by DJ Quik himself.

== Background ==
On December 9, 2013 in an interview with The Arsenio Hall Show's Extended Play in Los Angeles, Quik announced he received a budget for his upcoming ninth studio album and revealed his intention to channel the DJ Quik from 1989. The album title and release date were confirmed on September 17, 2014 in a press release from DJ Quik.

== Singles ==
On September 24, 2014, DJ Quik released the album's first single, titled "Life Jacket", featuring frequent collaborator Suga Free and Dom Kennedy. The song was produced by DJ Quik himself. The snippet for the song along with a short music video for "Life Jacket", directed by Jon Casey, was released on June 11, 2013.

== Critical reception ==
Professional ratings
Review scores
Source	Rating
AllMusic	4/5 stars
Complex	4/5 stars
Exclaim!	8/10
HipHopDX	4/5 stars
Pitchfork Media	8.2/10
The Smoking Section	4/5 stars
XXL	3/5 (XL)

The Midnight Life received generally positive reviews from music critics. Fred Thomas of AllMusic said, "The album ... is a fun-loving affair, frequently switching styles from jazzy, sophisticated R&B workouts like "Pet Cemetery" to heavier trap and gangsta rap beats." Jayson Greene of Pitchfork Media stated, "The enlivening Quik touch is everywhere: 25 years into his career, he is still discovering how 2 or 3 sounds can make you momentarily forget how rap songs usually go." Darryl Robertson of XXL said, "The Midnight Life shows that Quik has a passion for making music, even if it necessarily doesn’t bless the ears of today’s hip-hop fans. In a genre where styles and flows change, Quik—including his content–remains the same, which validates his authenticity. However, he fails to adjust his style to the newer generation."

== Commercial performance ==
The album debuted at number 63 on the Billboard 200, with sales of 5,097 copies in the United States.

== Track listing ==
No.	Title	Writer(s)	Producer(s)	Length
1.	"Intro"	David Blake	DJ Quik	1:45
2.	"That Nigga'z Crazy"	Blake	DJ Quik	3:54
3.	"Back That Shit Up" (featuring Tay F 3rd & David Blake II)	Blake; Blake, Jr.; D. Kim	DJ Quik	3:55
4.	"Trapped on the Tracks" (featuring Bishop Lamont & David Blake II)	Blake; Blake, Jr, Philip Martin	DJ Quik	4:51
5.	"El's Interlude 2" (featuring El DeBarge)	Blake; Eldra DeBarge	DJ Quik	0:41
6.	"Puffin' the Dragon"	Blake	DJ Quik	3:43
7.	"Pet Semetery"	Blake	DJ Quik	4:06
8.	"Life Jacket" (featuring Suga Free & Dom Kennedy)	Blake; Dominic Hunn; Dejuan Walker	DJ Quik; David Balfour	4:26
9.	"That Getter" (featuring David Blake II)	Blake, Blake, Jr.	DJ Quik	4:56
10.	"The Conduct" (featuring Mack 10)	Blake; Dedrick Rolison	DJ Quik	3:38
11.	"Shine" (featuring David Blake II)	Blake; Blake, Jr.	DJ Quik	3:13
12.	"Bacon's Groove" (featuring Rob "Fonksta" Bacon)	Blake; Robert Bacon, Jr.	DJ Quik	5:14
13.	"Broken Down" (featuring Suga Free & Tweed Cadillac)	Blake; Brown; Walker	DJ Quik	4:15
14.	"Why'd You Have to Lie" (featuring Joi)	Blake; Gilliam	DJ Quik	3:37
15.	"Fuck All Night"	Blake	DJ Quik	3:48
16.	"Quik's Groove 9"	Blake	DJ Quik	3:12
Total length:				59:15

== Personnel ==
Credits for The Midnight Life adapted from Allmusic.

- Richie Abbott – Project Manager, Publicity
- Jason Allen – Keyboards
- Rob "Fonksta" Bacon – Bass, Composer, Featured Artist, Guitar, Moog Synthesizer
- David "Preach" Bal4 – Keyboards, Piano, Producer
- David Blake II – Drum Programming, Featured Artist, Keyboards, Programming, Vocals
- Tweed Cadillac – Vocals
- El DeBarge – Composer, Featured Artist, Keyboards
- DJ Quik – Bass, Drum Programming, Drums, Horn, Instrumentation, Keyboards, Primary Artist, Producer
- David Foreman – Bass, Guitar
- Eboni Foster – Vocals
- Kenya Frank – Photography
- Brian Gardner – Mastering
- Joi – Vocals
- Dom Kennedy – Vocals
- Bishop Lamont – Vocals
- Mack 10 – Vocals
- Marco Olivia – Design, Packaging
- Rillah – Photography
- Courtney Robertson – Guitar
- Keith Ross – Bass, Composer
- Stephen Sletten – Engineer
- Keisha Smith – Vocals
- Suga Free – Vocals
- Tayf3rd – Vocals
- D-Loc Walker – Drums

== Charts ==
Chart (2014)	Peak position
US Billboard 200	63
US Top R&B/Hip-Hop Albums (Billboard)	11
US Top Rap Albums (Billboard)	7
US Independent Albums (Billboard)	11
US Indie Store Album Sales (Billboard)	9

== Release history ==
Regions	Dates	Label(s)	Ref.
United States	October 14, 2014	Mad Science, INgrooves	
