= Soren Baker =

American journalist

- Education: Xavier University
- Occupations: Journalist, Hip hop and rap writer, author, director, producer, screenwriter
- Website: Unique Access Ent.

Soren Baker is an American journalist specializing in hip-hop coverage. He is widely recognized for his six-year tenure as a senior editor at The Source. Over the course of his career, Baker has contributed more than 3,500 articles to a variety of major publications, including The New York Times, Los Angeles Times, Chicago Tribune, XXL, The Source, HipHopDX, and RedBullUSA.com.

Baker has written liner notes for albums by 2Pac, Ice Cube, N.W.A, Gang Starr, and others. In addition to his work in music journalism, he has contributed to television programs for VH1 and Fuse.

Beyond music, Baker has extensively covered sports, with a focus on the NFL, and has authored books about the Baltimore Ravens. He has also written, produced, and directed multiple DVDs, including Tech N9ne: The Psychumentary.

From 2014 to 2016, Baker co-hosted Open Bar Radio alongside Xzibit on KDAY in Los Angeles.

Baker has been interviewed multiple times, including by Rolling Stone, ESPN, BET, and TV One, among others. From 2013 to 2016 he served as the news editor of HipHopDX. In March 2016 he founded Unique Access Entertainment which delivers original, exclusive video content with A-List entertainers, including MC Ren, Nice & Smooth, Ice-T, G Perico, T. Rodgers, MC Eiht, Skeme, Dana Dane, CJ Mac, Big Tray Deee, RBX, Mitchy Slick, and Slink Johnson. The network has logged more than 10 million views on YouTube and aired more than 1,400 videos.

Soren Baker's book The History Of Gangster Rap: From Schoolly D to Kendrick Lamar, the Rise of a Great American Art form was published October 2, 2018, by Abrams Books.

With Gucci Mane, Soren Baker co-authored The Gucci Mane Guide To Greatness, which was published October 13, 2020 by Simon & Schuster. On November 9, 2021, the paperback edition of the book was published.

Baker's next book, Chronicles of the Juice Man with Juicy J, is slated for a September 5, 2023 release via Hanover Square Press.

== Bibliography ==
Baker has authored or co-authored more than 10 books.

- Baker, Soren (June 7, 2011). I'm The White Guy – The Tech N9ne Edition. Takoma Ridge Media. ISBN 978-0983638216.
- Baker, Soren (August 1, 2011). I'm The White Guy – The Jay-Z Edition. Takoma Ridge Media. ISBN 978-0983638254.
- Game., Baker, Soren (August 26, 2011). The Making of Game's The R.E.D Album. Takoma Ridge Media. ISBN 978-0983638278.
- Glasses Malone., Baker, Soren (September 6, 2011). The Making Of Glasses Malone's Beach Cruiser. Greenwood Hill Press. ISBN 978-0983638292.
- Young Bleed., Baker, Soren (October 17, 2011). The Making of Young Bleed's Preserved. Takoma Ridge Media. ISBN 978-0979786815.
- Murs., Baker, Soren (January 12, 2012). The Making Of Murs' Love & Rockets Vol 1 The Transformation. Takoma Ridge Media. ISBN 978-0979786839.
- Baker, Soren (March 1, 2012). "One Catch Away : The Story of the 2011 Baltimore Ravens". Takoma Ridge Media. ISBN 978-0979786853.
- Gobeille, Todd., Baker, Soren (March 5, 2012). My Journey Home: How I Went From Pimping and Drug Pushing To Peace and Positivity. BakerGobeille Books. ISBN 978-0615613338.
- Baker, Soren (June 22, 2012). The Music Library: The History of Rap and Hip-Hop. Lucent. ISBN 978-1420508222.
- Baker, Soren (April 17, 2013). I'm The White Guy – The Snoop Dogg Edition. Takoma Ridge Media. ISBN 978-0984691272.
- Baker, Soren (October 2, 2018). The History Of Gangster Rap: From Schoolly D to Kendrick Lamar, the Rise of a Great American Art form. Abrams Books. ISBN 978-1419729157.
- Mane, Gucci., Baker, Soren (October 13, 2020). The Gucci Mane Guide To Greatness. Simon & Schuster. ISBN 978-1982146788.
