= Blaqkout =

Studio album by DJ Quik & Kurupt
- Released: June 9, 2009
- Recorded: 2008–2009
- Genre: West Coast hip hop; gangsta rap; hardcore hip hop
- Length: 41:53
- Label: Mad Science; Penagon; Fontana Distribution
- Producer: DJ Quik (also exec.); Kurupt (exec.); Terrace Martin

DJ Quik chronology
Trauma (2005)	Blaqkout (2009)	The Book of David (2011)

Kurupt chronology
Same Day, Different Shit (2006)	Blaqkout (2009)	Streetlights (2010)

Singles from Blaqkout
- 1. "Hey Playa (Moroccan Blues)" Released: May 5, 2009; 2. "Whatcha Wan Do" Released: May 5, 2009

Blaqkout (stylized as "BlaQKout") is a collaboration album by rapper/record producer DJ Quik and rapper Kurupt. It is completely produced by DJ Quik. The album debuted at No. 61 on the Billboard 200, selling 10,000 copies its first week.

== Background ==
While putting the finishing touches on Snoop Dogg’s acclaimed Ego Trippin album in early 2008, DJ Quik had an idea. The rapper-producer-musician-entrepreneur wanted to do a full-length album with Kurupt, the Dogg Pound member and Snoop Dogg affiliated-rapper he’d known since Death Row Records’ mid-1990s heyday and had worked with sparingly over the years. The inspiration for the name of the album was taken from the Method Man & Redman collaborative albums Blackout! and Blackout! 2 since this was also a collaboration album. It was modified to include the letter Q to represent DJ Quik and the letter K to represent Kurupt. Kurupt revealed the album was recorded within 6 months.

== Critical reception ==
Professional ratings
Aggregate scores
Source	Rating
Metacritic	83/100
Review scores
Source	Rating
AllMusic	3.5/5 stars
The A.V. Club	B+
The Boston Phoenix	4/4 stars
Christgau’s Consumer Guide	(choice cut)
Cokemachineglow	70%
HipHopDX	3.5/5 stars
Pitchfork	8.2/10
RapReviews	8.5/10
URB	3.5/5 stars

Blaqkout received widespread critical acclaim from contemporary music critics. AllMusic wrote, "Just like the similarly titled 2009 album from Method Man and Redman, DJ Quik and Kurupt's Blaqkout is a throwback triumph that succeeds thanks to the hip-hop veterans' superior chemistry and informal attitude. Anyone expecting a courageous game changer will be disappointed by all the swaggering, sexual bragging, and irresponsible pimping the duo frontload onto the effort, but coming to terms with the overall weekend attitude is quick and easy, thanks to rock-solid hooks and Quik's production. On 'Ohh!' he creates a head-bobbing backing track out of chopped-up vocals and Smooth jazz keyboards, offering a G-funk alternative to Timbaland's 'Indian Flute'. Key track 'Do You Know' finds him blending blissed-out ambience and a Soul II Soul hook, but 'F**k Y'All' employs Quik's classic formula with that West Coast funk over thumping bass." The A.V. Club rated the album with a B+ and wrote DJ Quik has long been one of the most consistent producers in Hip hop, as well as a skilled (though sometimes ridiculously sexist) MC. But he’s seldom been in the lean, adventurous form he explores on BlaQKout, a collaboration with Dogg Pound member Kurupt. Quik’s tracks are head-turning throughout: The blistering single “9X Outta 10” features Kurupt at his steeliest and takes the minimal slam-beats aesthetic of Clipse’s 2002 hit “Grindin'” to a lush new place, especially when a couple of cut-up female vocals enter the mix. “Do You Know” is cinematic soul with his usual easy-gliding groove slipping around under it; “Ohh!” calls up early-’80s Zapp and early-’00s 2-step garage (more cut-up vocals); North African overtones spice the heavy stomp of “Hey Playa (Moroccan Blues).” The lyrics aren’t going to win awards for thematic originality, and there’s an especially egregious spoken-word bit poorly justifying the excessive use of the word “bitch,” but most of the time, Quik and Kurupt sound invigorated by each other. Or as Quik ends a verse in “Hey Playa,” in slow motion, “I’m that much quicker.” The Phoenix gave the album 4/4 stars and wrote LA hip-hop has two threads, and DJ Quik pulls both of them. The first is g-funk, a production style that relies on deep, open grooves and an endless parade of funk samples. The second is West Coast backpacker rap, which is what happens when guys with enormous vocabularies smoke a lot of weed. The fact that Quik has inhabited both worlds for two decades is a pretty nifty trick: he can go "out there" without disappearing completely, and he can talk about problems in the ghetto without sounding as if he lived at the Gap. On BlaQKout, his collaboration with the Philadelphia/LA MC Kurupt, his sonics range far and wide. "Do You Know" has a glamorous sweep that suggests something like wise retrospection, and it leads right into "Watcha Wan Do," which could be the funky soundtrack to a Zelda game. Eventually, there's "9X Outta 10," which sounds as if somebody had handed turntables to the Terminator. This one has Kurupt rapping as if he were hypnotized — "It's gonna start again where it started at/Ended up, and restart again." It all might seem like preamble when you finally get to "Jupiter's Critic and the Mind of Mars," which may be the weirdest slice of rap genius since "A Milli." Quik has some of Prince's little-guy arrogance, and here it's nearly schizoid: "It's character, you miss it?/It's America, you visit?/Did you get on a boat without a ticket?" Uh, yes? What? This makes him sound crazier than he actually is, though. Quik knows what he's doing. You can hear it on every track of this symphonic mini-masterpiece.

== Commercial performance ==
The album debuted at number sixty-one on the Billboard 200, selling 8,800 copies in its first week. It also entered at number six on Billboard's Top Rap Albums, number eleven on Top R&B/Hip-Hop Albums and number nine on Independent Albums. In its second week, it dropped to number one-hundred-ninety-one on the Billboard 200 with sales of 3,000. As of April 24, 2012, BlaQKout has sold 30,000 copies in the United States.

== Accolades and legacy ==
BlaQKout appeared on several critics' year-end top albums lists. Rhapsody deemed it the 20th best album of 2009. The album was ranked at number 25 by Pitchfork Media.

Later DJ Quik said he's very pleased with the album: "I love Blaqkout. We only sold a measly 30,000 records, no marketing. No international distribution because Fontana doesn't have that, my distributor. That record was done for the sake of art. Not even hip-hop, just art. New gear, new Pro Tools system. New recording technique. New microphones, new samples. Let's go! If you don't mind, it's not going to be a gangster rap record. It's going to be eclectic, and avant-garde, and enigmatic and all this weird shit. It's just gonna be some funky new shit. He (Kurupt) was like, 'Push the button.' Every time I pushed the button, we'd be in there quirk-ing out, funking out. And I kept my sound; it's still raw, still funky. At the same time, Kurupt sounds great, I sound pretty good I think. We did a record that is for the sake of music. It makes sense."

== Track listing ==
No.	Title	Writer(s)	Producer(s)	Length
1.	"BlaQKout"	David Blake; Ricardo Brown	DJ Quik	3:01
2.	"Cream n Ya Panties" (featuring Tre Mak)	Blake; Brown; Cole	DJ Quik	4:05
3.	"Do You Know"	Blake; Brown; Nellee Hooper; Simon Law; Timothy Christian Riley; Trevor Romeo; Raphael Saadiq; Caron Wheeler; D'wayne Wiggins	DJ Quik	3:28
4.	"Whatcha Wan Do" (featuring Problem and Yo-Yo)	Blake; Brown; Jason Martin; Yolanda Whittaker	DJ Quik	3:33
5.	"Ohh!"	Blake; Brown	DJ Quik	3:15
6.	"Fuck Y'all" (featuring Puff Johnson)	Blake; Brown; Ewanya Johnson	DJ Quik	3:14
7.	"Hey Playa (Moroccan Blues)"	Blake; Brown	DJ Quik	4:21
8.	"Exodus"	Blake; Brown	DJ Quik	3:02
9.	"9x's Outta 10"	Blake; Brown	DJ Quik	2:55
10.	"Jupiter's Critic & the Mind of Mars"	Blake; Brown	DJ Quik	2:28
11.	"The Appeal"	Blake; Brown; Terrace Martin	DJ Quik; Terrace Martin^{[a]}	3:37
12.	"Problem: The B Stands for Beautiful"	Blake; Brown; Martin	DJ Quik	1:20
13.	"Whatcha Wan Do" (Alternative Version) (featuring Problem and Yo-Yo)	Blake; Brown; Martin; Whittaker	DJ Quik	3:34
Total length:				41:53

iTunes bonus track
No.	Title	Writer(s)	Producer(s)	Length
14.	"Bees to the Honey"	Blake; Brown	DJ Quik	3:58
Total length:				45:51

Notes

- ^{^[a]} signifies a co-producer

Sample credits

- "Do You Know" contains samples of "Anniversary" by Tony! Toni! Toné! and "Back to Life (However Do You Want Me)" by Soul II Soul

== Personnel ==
Credits for Blaqkout adapted from liner notes.

- Desiree Anderson – vocals
- George Archie – keyboard
- Robert Bacon, Jr. – guitar
- Keith Crouch – moog synthesizer, synthesizer bass
- DJ Quik – audio production, drums, keyboards, mixing, percussion, sequencers, synthesizer, vocals
- Scott Elgin – audio engineer
- Joshua Barner – audio engineer
- Dave Foreman – bass, guitar
- Shawn Germany – audio engineer
- Puff Johnson – vocals
- Kurupt – vocals
- Terrace Martin – audio production
- Tai "Missy" Phillips – vocals
- Problem – vocals
- John T. Smith – guitar
- Tre Mak – vocals
- Derrick Walker – percussion
- Yolanda Whittaker – vocals

== Charts ==
Chart (2009)	Peak position
US Billboard 200	61
US Billboard Top R&B/Hip-Hop Albums	11
US Billboard Independent Albums	9
US Billboard Top Rap Albums	6
