= Trauma (DJ Quik album) =

Studio album by DJ Quik
- Released: September 13, 2005 (US)
- Recorded: June 2003–June 2005
- Genre: Hip hop
- Length: 44:37
- Labels: Mad Science; Fontana Distribution
- Producer: DJ Quik (also exec.)

DJ Quik chronology
The Best of DJ Quik: Da Finale (2002)	Trauma (2005)	Blaqkout (2009)

Singles from Trauma
- 1. "Black Mercedes" Released: April 15, 2005; 2. "Fandango" Released: June 30, 2005; 3. "Get Down" Released: August 9, 2005; 4. "Ladies & Thugs" Released: December 21, 2005

Trauma is the seventh album by rapper/producer DJ Quik. It was released in 2005 and sold 100,000 copies through his own independent label Mad Science Records. The album debuted at number forty three on the U.S. Billboard 200 chart, with 24,000 copies sold in its first-week. An all instrumental version of the album was also released.

== Background ==
Tha album was originally supposed to be released in March 2005 on Warner Bros. Records, but he changed labels and got a distribution deal with Fontana.

DJ Quik spoke on the album with an interview with DubCNN and said "It's the dopest album I've ever done. It's better than "Quik Is the Name", it's a classic. It's hot, it's a new sound. I got the best collaborations, I got some real talented people. I made everybody sound the same, it's not like Nate Dogg sounds better than Wyclef Jean. It's not like that, it's a uniform record. Every record goes into the next record the right way. It's like a movie, it's not even like an album. It's real visual, you can see it and you can feel it. It's recorded real well, I used a lot of real new equipment. And I worked with some of the best musicians on the planet. So it's a unstoppable record, and I look forward to send all these fuckin producers back to the drawing board. And I'm the shit, I think I'm the best right now. Matter of fact, when you hear "Trauma", you gonna think I'm the best too".

== Critical response ==
Professional ratings
Review scores
Source	Rating
AllMusic	3.5/5 stars
DubCNN.com	4.5/5 stars
HipHopDX.com	3/5 stars
Los Angeles Times	3/4 stars
Rapreviews.com	4/5 stars

Trauma received mixed reviews from contemporary music critics. Allmusic gave the album 3.5/5 stars and wrote DJ Quik is the essence of West Coast hip-hop, having been there from the early days when Compton was asserting itself as the voice of rap as the 1980s bled into the '90s, and Trauma, the rapper/producer's seventh album and first in three years, finds Quik as relevant and potent in both lyrics and beats as when he dropped Quik Is the Name. Never flashy, Quik finds art in simplicity, as with the laid-back groove of "Black Mercedes," and the rapid-fire spitting about relationships and distractions on "Catch 22." Soren Baker of the Los Angeles Times wrote that On his seventh album, Quik enhances both his musicianship and his rapping, updating his sound by focusing on an airy, crisp production style that tones down the funk backbone and draws attention to the groove-driven guitar, horn, drum and turntable work that propels the sonic side of the album.

== Commercial performance ==
The album debuted at number forty three on the US Billboard 200 chart, with first-week sales of 24,000 copies in the United States. It also entered at number nine on Billboard's Top Rap Albums, number thirteen on Top R&B/Hip-Hop Albums and number one on Independent Albums. As of January 31, 2006 the album has sold over 100,000 copies in the United States.

== Track listing ==
No.	Title	Writer(s)	Length
1.	"Doctor's Office (Intro)"	David Blake	0:19
2.	"Intro for Roger"	Blake	2:58
3.	"Fandango" (featuring B-Real)	Blake; Louis Freese	3:36
4.	"Till Jesus Comes"	Blake	3:04
5.	"Black Mercedes" (featuring Nate Dogg)	Blake; Nathaniel Hale	3:56
6.	"Get Up" (featuring The Game & AMG)	Blake; Jason Lewis; Jayceon Taylor	3:07
7.	"Get Down" (featuring Chingy)	Blake; Howard Bailey, Jr.	3:07
8.	"Ladies & Thugs" (featuring Wyclef Jean)	Blake; Wyclef Jean	3:47
9.	"Catch 22"	Blake	3:33
10.	"Indiscretions in the Back of the Limo" (featuring T.I.)	Blake; Clifford Harris, Jr.	3:44
11.	"Spur Of The Moment" (featuring Ludacris & Kimmi J.)	Blake; Christopher Bridges; T. Moore	4:20
12.	"Quikstrumental (Quik's Groove 7)" (featuring Jodeci)	Blake; Dalvin DeGrate; Cedric Hailey; Joel Hailey; Derek DeGrate; Donald DeGrate	3:06
13.	"Jet Set" (featuring Tai Elton Phillips)	Blake; Tai Phillips	2:46
14.	"California" (featuring AMG)	Blake; Lewis	3:15

== Personnel ==
Credits for Trauma adapted from liner notes.

- John Allis - Engineer
- AMG - Primary Artist
- B-Real - Guest Artist, Primary Artist
- Robert Bacon - Guitar, Horn
- Big Kuntry King - Background Vocals
- David Blake - Composer
- Keith Boskonvich - Background Vocals
- Gina Brucato - Assistant
- Chingy - Guest Artist, Primary Artist
- Erik "Baby Jesus" Coomes - Bass, Guitar
- Adam Deitch - Drums, Percussion
- DJ Coke-E - Scratching
- DJ Quik - Primary Artist
- Nate Dogg - Guest Artist, Primary Artist
- Dave Foreman - Guitar
- The Game - Primary Artist
- Faryal Ganjehei - Stylist
- Brian Gardner - Mastering
- Keith Gretlein - Engineer
- Bernie Grundman - Mastering
- Nathaniel Hale - Composer
- T.I. - Composer
- Willie Hudspeth - Background Vocals
- Wyclef Jean - Guest Artist, Primary Artist
- JellyRoll - Piano
- Jodeci - Guest Artist, Primary Artist
- Ludacris - Guest Artist, Primary Artist
- Midwestern Gluryslappers - Handclaps
- Marcus Miller - Horn
- Cornelius Mims - Bass, Strings
- Todd Moore - Composer
- Jaime Sickora - Engineer
- Adam Shmeans Smirnoff - Guitar
- T.I. - Guest Artist, Primary Artist
- Mark Valentine - Engineer
- German Villacorta - Engineer

== Charts ==
Chart (2005)	Peak position
US Billboard 200	43
US Billboard Top R&B/Hip-Hop Albums	13
US Billboard Top Rap Albums	9
US Billboard Independent Albums	1

== See also ==
- List of Billboard 200 number-one independent albums
