= Safe + Sound =

Studio album by DJ Quik
- Released: February 21, 1995
- Studio: Skip Saylor Recording (Los Angeles)
- Genres: West Coast hip-hop; gangsta rap; g-funk; jazz rap
- Length: 67:28
- Label: Profile
- Producers: DJ Quik; G-One; Courtney Branch; Tracy Kendrick; Robert Bacon

DJ Quik chronology
Way 2 Fonky (1992)	Safe + Sound (1995)	Rhythm-al-ism (1998)

Singles from Safe + Sound
- 1. "Safe + Sound" Released: 1995; 2. "Summer Breeze" Released: 1995

Safe + Sound is the third album by rapper/producer DJ Quik. It was released on February 21, 1995, on Profile Records. It peaked at number 14 on the Billboard 200 on March 11, 1995, number one on the Top R&B/Hip-Hop Albums chart the same date, and was certified Gold by the RIAA on July 11, 1995. The album was executive-produced by Suge Knight. The album featured the singles "Safe + Sound" and "Summer Breeze". A music video was produced for "Safe + Sound".

== Critical reception ==
Professional ratings
Review scores
Source	Rating
AllMusic	3/5 stars
RapReviews	8.5/10
The Source	4/5 stars
Vibe	(favorable)

AllMusic's John Bush wrote: "Caught up with extolling his sexiness and success with women, DJ Quik raps about little else on his third album. The lyrics are funny though, and his G-funk grooves do help things." Pete T. of RapReviews praised Quik for utilizing more live instrumentation to craft "full-blown masterpieces" throughout the track listing, highlighting the record's "rich soundscapes and masterfully arranged orchestrations with dense layers of sounds, intricate rhythms, and well-balanced songwriting." While giving note of the "lewd subject matter" being a turn off for listeners, Pete T. called Quik's Safe + Sound "an absolute musical gem and a quintessential summer album featuring his signature "p-funk" that stands out even among the myriad commercial and critical hits from L.A. in '95."

== Track listing ==
No.	Title	Writer(s)	Producer(s)	Length
1.	"Street Level Entrance"	David Blake	DJ Quik	1:52
2.	"Get at Me"	Larry Blackmon; Blake; Byron Byrd	DJ Quik	4:07
3.	"Diggin U Out"	Blake	DJ Quik	4:48
4.	"Safe + Sound"	George Archie; Blake	DJ Quik; G-One^{[c]}	4:48
5.	"Somethin' 4 tha Mood"	Archie; Blake; George Clinton, Jr.	DJ Quik; G-One^{[c]}	5:55
6.	"Don't You Eat It!"	Blake	DJ Quik	1:07
7.	"Can I Eat It?"	Archie; Blake	DJ Quik	4:59
8.	"It'z Your Fantasy"	Archie; Blake	DJ Quik; G-One^{[c]}	4:22
9.	"Tha Ho in You" (featuring Hi-C & 2nd II None)	Archie; Darius Barnett; Blake; Kelton L. McDonald; Crawford Wilkerson	DJ Quik	4:44
10.	"Dollaz + Sense"	Blake	DJ Quik	5:52
11.	"Let You Havit"	Blake	DJ Quik	3:40
12.	"Summer Breeze"	Blake; Jerome Louis "J.J." Jackson	DJ Quik; Courtney Branch; Tracy Kendrick^{[c]}	4:33
13.	"Quik's Groove III"	Archie; Robert Bacon; Blake	DJ Quik; Robert Bacon; G-One^{[c]}	2:37
14.	"Sucka Free" (featuring Playa Hamm)	Blake	DJ Quik	2:10
15.	"Keep tha "P" in It" (featuring Playa Hamm, Hi-C, 2nd II None & Kam)	Barnett; Blake; McDonald; Craig Miller; Wilkerson	DJ Quik	5:24
16.	"Hooray 4 tha Funk (Reprise)"	Blake; Garry Shider	DJ Quik	2:12
17.	"Tanqueray" (Hidden bonus track)	Blake	DJ Quik	4:19
Total length:				63:21

- ^{^c} signifies an additional producer.

== Personnel ==
Credits for Safe + Sound adapted from AllMusic.

- George Archie - Composer, Drums, Instrumental, Liner Notes, Multi Instruments, Producer, Background Vocals
- Del Atkins - Bass
- Robert Bacon - Bass, Composer, Guitar, Producer
- Darius Barnett - Composer
- Larry Blackmon - Composer
- David Blake - Primary Artist, Producer, Vocals, Bass, Composer, Drum Programming, Drums, Instrumental, Multi Instruments, Strings, Synthesizer, Talk Box
- Courtney Branch - Producer
- Byron Byrd - Composer
- Warryn Campbell - Electric Piano, Strings
- Crystal Cerrano - Vocals, Background Vocals
- George Clinton - Composer
- Kenneth Crouch - Piano, Electric Piano
- Alex Al - Bass
- Dave Foreman - Guitar
- LaSalle Gabriel - Guitar
- Reggie Green - Piano, Background Vocals
- Charles Greene - Flute, Saxophone
- J. J. Jackson - Composer
- Tracy Kendrick - Producer
- Suge Knight - Executive Producer
- Dionne Knighton - Vocals
- K. McCord - Composer
- Marvin McDaniel - Guitar
- Kelton McDonald - Vocals
- Rebecca Meek - Art Direction, Design
- Garry Shider - Vocals
- Norma Vega - Background Vocals
- Crawford Wilkerson - Vocals
- Bernie Worrell - Piano

== Charts ==
=== Weekly charts ===
Chart (1995)	Peak position
US Billboard 200	14
US Top R&B/Hip-Hop Albums (Billboard)	1

=== Year-end charts ===
Chart (1995)	Position
US Billboard 200	182
US Top R&B/Hip-Hop Albums (Billboard)	36

== Certifications ==
Region	Certification	Certified units/sales
United States (RIAA)	Gold	500,000^{^}
^{^} Shipments figures based on certification alone.

== See also ==
- List of number-one R&B albums of 1995 (U.S.)
