= The Fixxers =

American hip hop group

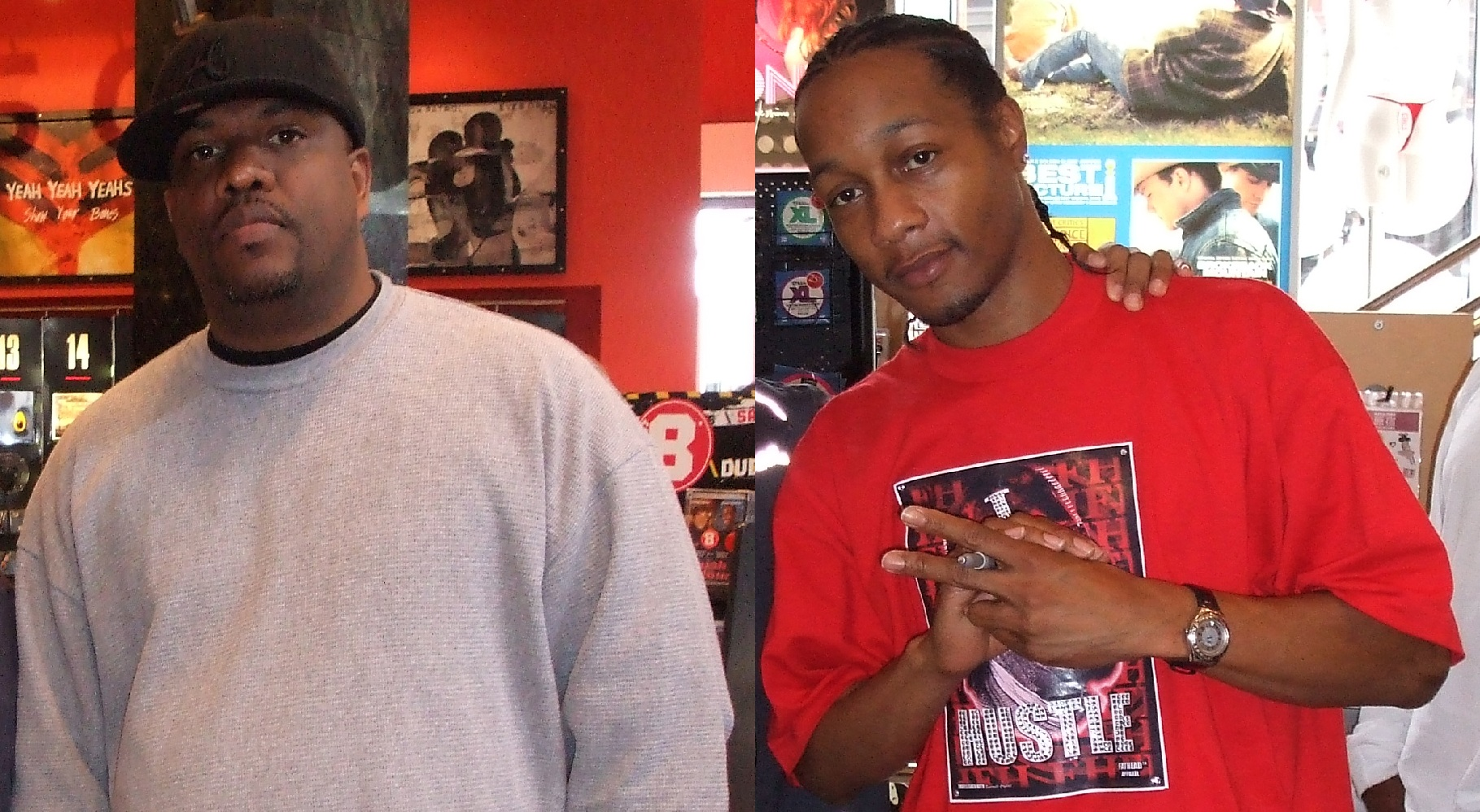
- AMG (left) and DJ Quik (right)

Background information
- Origin: Compton, California
- Genres: Hip hop
- Years active: 2006–2008
- Labels: Interscope; Secret Music Group; Dirty West
- Members: DJ Quik; AMG
- Website: thefixxers.com

The Fixxers is an American hip hop supergroup, formed in late 2006 by two Compton-based West Coast rap veterans DJ Quik and AMG.

Quik and AMG had worked together some years earlier when Quik (then known as DJ Quik) produced some records that AMG appeared on. When Quik was released from a prison sentence for parole violation, he decided to form the duo with long-time friend AMG. The group's name was chosen by AMG and Quik's manager Greedy Greg, and in their own words refers to their desire to "fix music" - "We're fixing music out here. We're interchanging our LA people. Right now. Where it was all dry before, we're giving them a breath of fresh air that's homegrown" - Quik. The group signed a singles deal with Interscope Records after their track "Can U Werk Wit Dat" received regular airplay on Los Angeles radio, the label going on to release it as a single. It was chosen as number 22 on Vibe's "44 Best Songs of 2007". The single became a favorite on LA radio stations and was featured on the HBO TV show Entourage. It also featured on several Billboard charts: #7 on the Bubbling Under Hot 100 Singles chart, #20 on the Hot Rap Tracks chart, #21 on the Rhythmic Top 40 chart, and #74 on the Hot R&B/Hip-Hop Airplay chart, The group's debut album, Midnight Life, was supposed to be released in 2007, but never received a physical release; It was sold via the MySpace page of the Secret Music Group, with Quik claiming this was an unauthorized, unfinished version of the album, sold by a former business partner who had hacked Quik's MySpace to make the release look official.

The duo toured in 2007 as part of the Ball 4 Real Streetball Tour.

Their 2008 album Street Masterpiece received some positive reviews.

== Discography ==
=== Albums ===
- Midnight Life (2007)
- Street Masterpiece (2008) Secret Music Group

=== Singles ===
- "Can U Werk Wit Dat" (2007) Interscope
