= Penthouse Players Clique =

American hip hop group

- Also known as: Penthouse Players; P.P.C.
- Origin: Los Angeles, California
- Genres: West Coast hip hop; gangsta rap
- Years active: 1990–1993, 2001, 2007
- Labels: Ruthless; Priority Records
- Past members: Playa Hamm; Tweed Cadillac

Penthouse Players Clique was an American hip hop duo that consisted of rappers Playa Hamm (born Wilbert Bryan Milo) and Tweed Cadillac.

== Career ==
Initially under the stage name "Penthouse Players", the group released their first songs in 1990 with the singles "They Don't Know" and "Droppen Bombs". The group also featured on the Class Act soundtrack in 1992 with the song "Class Act II (Rap Version)". That same year, they were signed to Eazy-E's Ruthless Records, for which they released their debut and only album to date, Paid the Cost which featured production by DJ Quik, and guest verses by Quik, Eazy-E, D-Nasty and AMG. The album spawned three singles, the first of which "Explanation of a Playa" featured a music video with cameos from Eazy, Quik, AMG and MC Ren and charted at #50 on the Hot Rap Songs. The second single "Trust No Bitch" featured DJ Quik, Eazy-E, and AMG. The third single featured Quik and Eazy and also featured a music video. The group also appeared on the Trespass soundtrack later in 1992 with the song "I'm A Playa (Bitch)". However, just after this in 1993 the group disbanded due to a multitude of internal issues.

== Aftermath ==
After the group disbanded, Playa Hamm would remain close to DJ Quik, appearing on his albums Way 2 Fonky , Safe + Sound and Rhythm-al-ism . Tweed Cadillac featured on Mackadelics album Exposed To The Game in 1996. The group's two members reunited in 2001 for Playa Hamm's debut solo album Layin' Hands, on the tracks "Break the Bank" and "Grindin'". Tweed Cadillac released his own solo debut Toast 2 Tha Foolz in 2007, which had a feature from Playa Hamm on the track "Still A Playa". From 2014 onwards, Tweed Cadillac made more music which was exclusively released on his website tweedcadillac.com. Tweed Cadillac also featured on The Midnight Life CD by DJ Quik. Tweed Cadillac received a Legend award at The Westcoast Hip-Hop Awards in Oakland, California in 2017.

== Discography ==
=== Studio albums ===
| Title | Album details | Peak chart positions | | |
| Title | Album details | US | US R&B | US Heat. |
|---|---|---|---|---|
| Paid the Cost | Released: 1992; Label: Ruthless/Priority | 76 | 28 | 1 |

=== Singles ===
- "They Don't Know"/"Droppen Bombs" (1990)
- "Explanation of a Playa" (1992) - #50 on the Hot Rap Songs
- "Trust No Bitch" featuring DJ Quik, Eazy-E and AMG (1992)
- "P.S. Phuk U 2" featuring DJ Quik and Eazy-E (1992)

=== Solo projects ===
==== Playa Hamm ====
- Layin' Hands (2001)
- The Boss Playa Project with Bossolo (2011)

==== Tweed Cadillac ====
- Toast 2 Tha Foolz (2007)
- The Presidential Pimp Squad: Pearl Tongue (2012-2013)
- Age Dont Count N The Booth (2014)
- Suave EP (2015)
- Greatest Spits (2019)
- Cactus Cooler (2020)
- Classic 6 Pack Vol 1 (2021)
- Classic 6 Pack Vol.2 (2022)

==== As featured artist ====
List of singles as featured artist
| Title | Year | Album |
|---|---|---|
| "Str8 Og" (Natalac featuring Tweed Cadillac) | 2018 | Pimp of the Nation |
