= AMG (rapper) =

American rapper (born 1970)

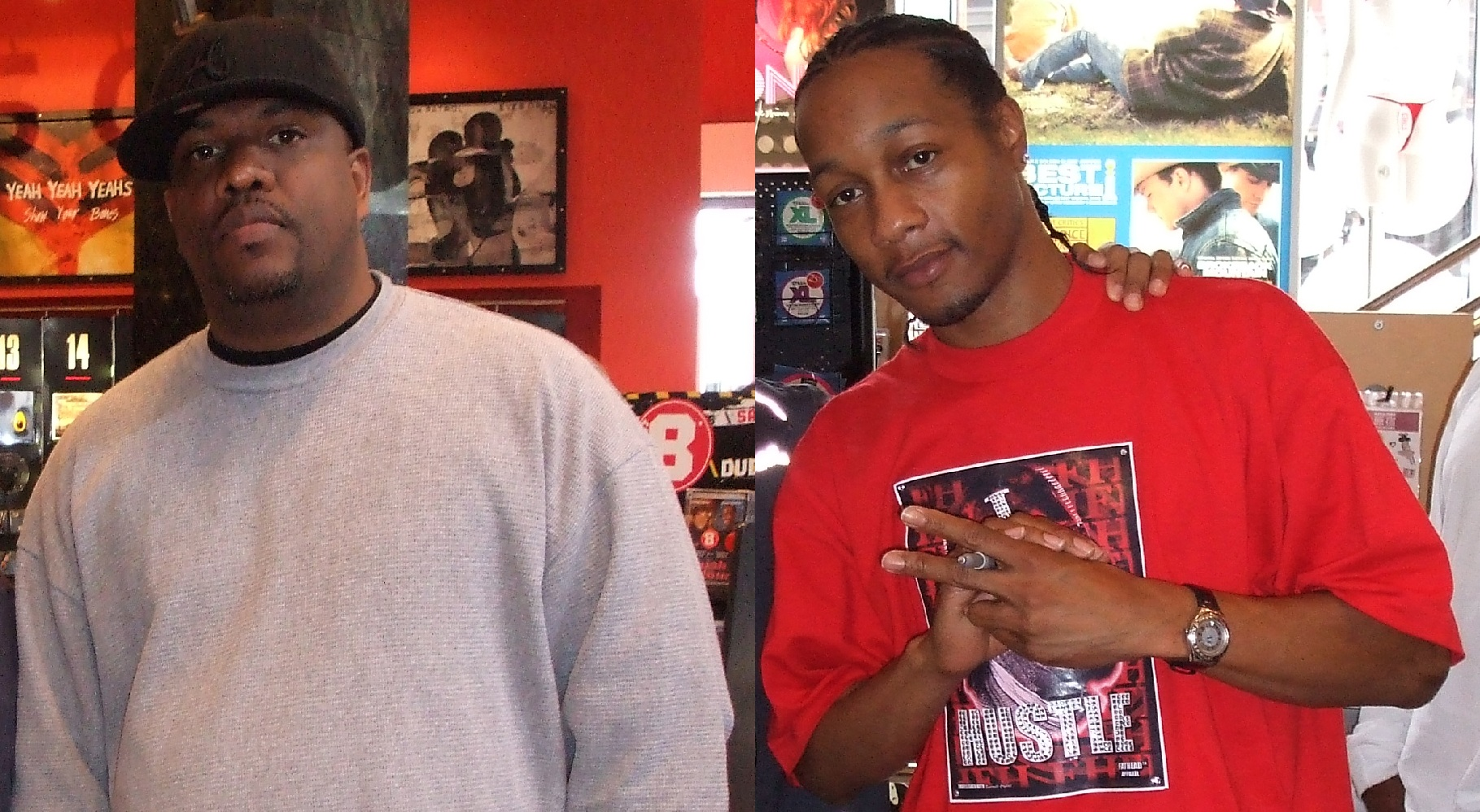
- AMG (left) with DJ Quik (right) as The Fixxers, 2010

Background information
- Born: Jason Lewis; September 29, 1970 (age 56)
- Origin: Inglewood, California, United States
- Genre: Dirty rap
- Occupation: Rapper
- Years active: 1987–present
- Label: Getti Records
- Website: www.myspace.com/gettirecords

Jason Lewis (born September 29, 1970), better known by his stage name AMG, is an American rapper.

== Career ==
AMG made his debut appearance in 1991 on the album Quik Is the Name by DJ Quik, on the songs "Deep", "Tear It Off" and "Skanless". His association with DJ Quik helped him secure a record deal with Select Records, who he signed to in 1991. That same year, he released his debut album, Bitch Betta Have My Money, which featured the singles "Bitch Betta Have My Money", "Jiggable Pie", "Vertical Joyride" and "I Wanna Be Yo Ho". AMG produced almost the entire album by himself, with DJ Quik serving as an additional producer on one song. The album was a moderate success commercially, reaching No. 63 on the US Billboard 200.

AMG is known for his sexually explicit lyrics, and most notably for songs like "Bitch Betta Have My Money" and "Jiggable Pie".

AMG appeared on porn star-turn-singer Midori's album Miss Judged in 2001. In 2007, AMG began recording an album with DJ Quik under the name "The Fixxers". They released a single through Interscope Records titled "Can U Werk Wit Dat". The album, Midnight Life, was scheduled to be released in mid-to-late 2007 but was shelved due to material being leaked prior to its release.

== Discography ==
=== Studio albums ===
Title	Album details	Peak chart positions		
Title	Album details	US	US R&B	US Rap
Bitch Betta Have My Money	Released: December 3, 1991; Label: Select; Format: CD, LP, cassette	63	20	—
Ballin' Outta Control	Released: June 6, 1995; Label: Select; Format: CD, LP, cassette	100	22	—
Bitch Betta Have My Money 2001	Released: December 5, 2000; Label: 304, Lightyear; Format: CD, LP, cassette	—	—	—

=== Compilation albums ===
Title	Album details
Greatest Humps Volume One	Released: 2016; Label: 304, Lightyear; Format: CD

=== Singles ===
Title	Release	Peak chart positions	Album
Title	Release	US Rap	Album
"Bitch Betta Have My Money"	1991	5	Bitch Betta Have My Money
"Jiggable Pie"	1991	11	Bitch Betta Have My Money
"Vertical Joyride"	1992	—	Bitch Betta Have My Money
"I Wanna Be Yo Ho"	1992	—	Bitch Betta Have My Money
"Don't Be a 304"	1992	—	Trespass (soundtrack)
"Butt Booty Naked"	1993	—	House Party 3 (soundtrack)
"Around the World"	1995	—	Ballin' Outta Control
"Pimp of the Century"	1995	—	Ballin' Outta Control
"Pimp's Anthem"	1997	—	non-album single
"Perfection"	2000	—	Bitch Betta Have My Money 2001
"No"	2003	—	Greatest Humps Volume 1
"Somethin' Nasty"	2004	—	non-album single
