= Shaquille O'Neal discography =

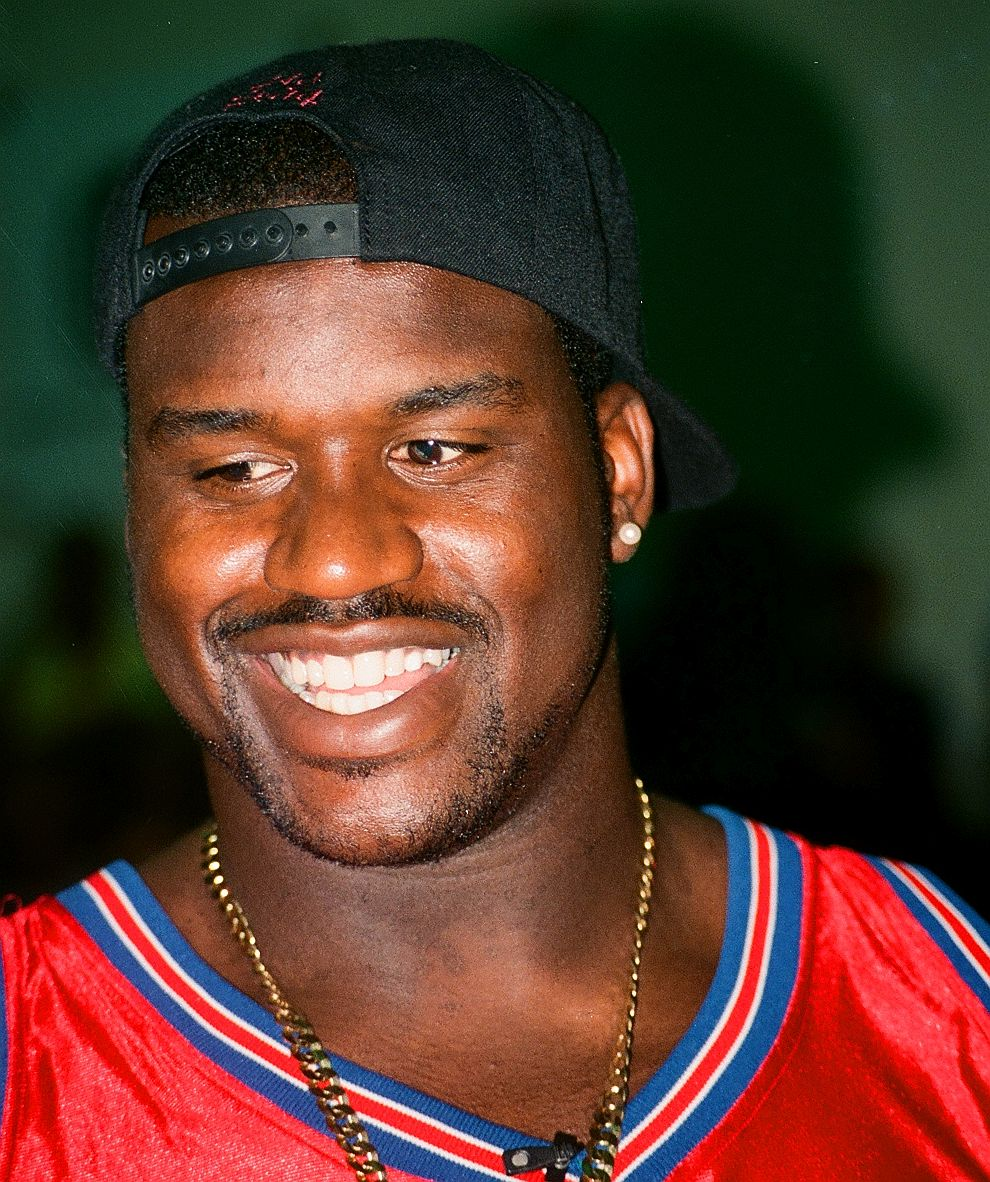
- O'Neal in 1998
- Studio albums: 5
- Extended plays: 1
- Soundtrack albums: 1
- Singles: 9
- Unreleased albums: 1

The discography of former professional basketball player, rapper, and DJ Shaquille O'Neal consists of five studio albums, two compilation albums, two soundtracks, one unreleased album, and 19 singles. O'Neal played in the NBA from 1992 until 2011. Around 1993, O'Neal was signed to Jive Records where he released his debut album, Shaq Diesel, in that year. The album peaked at number 25 on the Billboard 200, number 10 on R&B/Hip-Hop Albums, and was certified platinum by the Recording Industry Association of America (RIAA). Shaq Diesel produced four singles. The first, "What's Up Doc? (Can We Rock)", peaked at number 39 on the Billboard Hot 100, number 56 on R&B/Hip-Hop Songs, number 22 on Rap Songs, and was certified gold by the RIAA. The second, "(I Know I Got) Skillz", peaked at number 35 on the Billboard Hot 100, number 20 on R&B/Hip-Hop Songs, number 3 on Rap Songs, and was certified gold by the RIAA. It also peaked at number 34 on the New Zealand Singles Chart. The third, "I'm Outstanding", peaked at number 47 on the Billboard Hot 100, number 29 on R&B/Hip-Hop Songs, and number 6 on Rap Songs. Internationally, it peaked at number 43 on the New Zealand Singles Chart and number 70 on the UK Singles Chart. The fourth, "Shoot Pass Slam", did not chart.

Shaq Fu: Da Return (1994) was the rapper's second album. It peaked at number 67 on the Billboard 200, number 19 on R&B/Hip-Hop Albums, and was certified gold by the RIAA. The album spawned two singles: "Biological Didn't Bother" and "No Hook". The first peaked at number 78 on the Billboard Hot 100, 54 on R&B/Hip-Hop Songs, and 18 on Rap Songs. The second peaked at number 66 on R&B/Hip-Hop Songs and 16 on Rap Songs. O'Neal released his third album, You Can't Stop the Reign, in 1996. It peaked at number 82 on the Billboard 200 and number 21 on R&B/Hip-Hop Albums. You Can't Stop the Reign had two singles. The first, "You Can't Stop the Reign", peaked at number 54 on R&B/Hip-Hop Songs, 47 on the New Zealand Singles Chart, and 40 on the UK Singles Chart. The second single, "Strait Playin'," peaked at number 33 on R&B/Hip-Hop Songs and number 17 on the New Zealand Singles Chart. He followed the release with his first compilation, The Best of Shaquille O'Neal (1996), and two soundtracks, Kazaam (1996) and Steel (1997). The last peaked at number 185 on the Billboard 200 and number 26 on R&B/Hip-Hop Albums.

O'Neal released his fourth album, Respect, in 1996. It peaked at number 58 on the Billboard 200 and number 8 on R&B/Hip-Hop Albums. Only one single, "The Way It's Goin' Down", was released. It peaked at number 47 on R&B/Hip-Hop Songs and 62 on the UK Singles Chart. The rapper had a fifth album, Shaquille O'Neal Presents His Superfriends, Vol. 1, planned to release in 2001; however, it was cancelled. Although the album was cancelled, three singles were released, but they did not chart. In 2006, O'Neal's second compilation album was released, but it did not chart.

O'Neal's fifth studio album, Gorilla Warfare, was released in 2023 under the O'Neal's DJ name DIESEL, and marked a transition into dubstep and electronic dance music while retaining rap and hip-hop influences.

== Albums ==
=== Studio albums ===
List of albums, with selected chart positions
Title	Album details	Peak chart positions		Certifications
Title	Album details	US	US R&B	Certifications
Shaq Diesel	Released: October 26, 1993; Label: Jive; Format: CD, digital download, LP	25	10	RIAA: Platinum
Shaq Fu: Da Return	Released: November 8, 1994; Label: Jive; Format: CD, digital download, LP	67	19	RIAA: Gold
You Can't Stop the Reign	Released: November 19, 1996; Label: Interscope / A&M; Format: CD, digital download, LP	82	21	
Respect	Released: September 15, 1998; Label: Interscope / A&M; Format: CD, digital download, LP	58	8	
Gorilla Warfare (Note: Performing as DJ Diesel.)	Released: August 18, 2023; Label: Monstercat; Format: Digital download	—	—	
"—" denotes releases that did not chart.

=== Soundtrack albums ===
List of soundtrack albums, with selected chart positions
Title	Album details	Peak chart positions	
Title	Album details	US	US R&B
Steel	Released: July 29, 1997; Label: Warner Bros.	185	26

=== Unreleased albums ===
List of unreleased albums
Title	Album details
Shaquille O'Neal Presents His Superfriends, Vol. 1	Planned release: October 9, 2001; Label: Trauma

== Extended plays ==
Title	Details
M.D.E	Released: July 18, 2025; Label: Monstercat; Formats: Digital download

== Singles ==
List of singles, with selected chart positions
Title	Year	Peak chart positions					Certifications	Album
Title	Year	US	US R&B	US Rap	NZ	UK	Certifications	Album
"What's Up Doc? (Can We Rock)" (with Fu-Schnickens)	1993	39	56	22	—	—	RIAA: Gold	Shaq Diesel / Nervous Breakdown
"(I Know I Got) Skillz" (featuring Def Jef)	1993	35	20	3	34	—	RIAA: Gold	Shaq Diesel
"I'm Outstanding"	1993	47	29	6	43	70		Shaq Diesel
"Shoot Pass Slam"	1994	—	—	—	—	—		Shaq Diesel
"Biological Didn't Bother"	1994	78	54	18	—	182		Shaq Fu: Da Return
"No Hook" (Note: "No Hook" did not enter the Billboard Hot 100, but peaked at number 3 on Bubbling Under Hot 100 Singles.) (featuring RZA & Method Man)	1995	103	66	16	—	—		Shaq Fu: Da Return
"You Can't Stop the Reign" (featuring The Notorious B.I.G.)	1997	—	54	—	47	40		You Can't Stop the Reign
"Strait Playin'" (featuring Peter Gunz & DJ Quik)	1997	—	33	—	17	—		You Can't Stop the Reign
"Men of Steel" (with Ice Cube, B-Real, Peter Gunz & KRS-One)	1997	82	53	10	—	—		Steel (soundtrack)
"The Way It's Goin' Down" (featuring Peter Gunz)	1998	—	47	—	—	62		Respect
"Connected" (Note: "Connected" did not enter R&B/Hip-Hop Songs, but peaked at number 4 on Bubbling Under Hot R&B/Hip-Hop Singles.) (feat. WC and Nate Dogg)	2001	—	104	—	—	—		Shaquille O'Neal Presents His Superfriends, Vol. 1
"Do It Faster"	2001	—	—	—	—	—		Shaquille O'Neal Presents His Superfriends, Vol. 1
"In the Sun" (Note: "In The Sun" did not enter R&B/Hip-Hop Songs, but peaked at number 9 on Bubbling Under Hot R&B/Hip-Hop Singles.) (featuring Common, Black Thought & Joi)	2001	—	109	—	—	—		Shaquille O'Neal Presents His Superfriends, Vol. 1
"Extortion" (featuring Fat Joe & Big Pun)	2013	—	—	—	—	—		"Nightmare Concert" of The White Shadow of Norway
"Bang" (with Nghtmre & Lil Jon)	2019	—	—	—	—	—		Non-album singles
"Tear It Up" (with Eliminate)	2020	—	—	—	—	—		Non-album singles
"Welcome to the Playhouse" (with Steve Aoki)	2022	—	—	—	—	—		Non-album singles
"Bang Your Head" (with Hairitage)	2023	—	—	—	—	—		Gorilla Warfare
"Heat" (with Crankdat)	2023	—	—	—	—	—		Gorilla Warfare
"No Fear" (with Jessica Audiffred)	2023	—	—	—	—	—		Gorilla Warfare
"Chaos" (with Gawne)	2023	—	—	—	—	—		Non-album singles
"Next LVL" (with Level Up)	2024	—	—	—	—	—		Non-album singles
"Never Come Back" (with Sullivan King & Kompany)	2024	—	—	—	—	—		Chaos Will Bring Peace
"Damage" (with Virtual Riot)	2025	—	—	—	—	—		M.D.E
"Pay Respect" (with GorillaT & Fraxure)	2025	—	—	—	—	—		M.D.E
"Run It" (with Ivory)	2025	—	—	—	—	—		M.D.E
"Bring the Pain" (with Layz)	2025	—	—	—	—	—		M.D.E

== Guest appearances ==
List of songs, with selected chart positions
Title	Year	Peak chart positions	Album
Title	Year	UK	Album
"Intro" (Quincy Jones featuring Shaq & other announcers)	1995		Q's Jook Joint
"Stomp" (Quincy Jones featuring Melle Mel, Coolio, Yo-Yo, Shaquille O'Neal, & The Luniz)	1995	28	Q's Jook Joint
"2 Bad" (Michael Jackson featuring Shaq "Bad" Diesel)	1995	—	HIStory: Past, Present and Future, Book I
"Hit Me Off (N.E. Spyder & Shaq D)" (New Edition featuring Shaq)	1996		Non-album single
"Bow Down (Remix)" (Westside Connection featuring Shaq)	1996		Non-album single
"Strawberries" (Computer Love Remix) (Smooth featuring Shaquille O'Neal and Roger Troutman)	1997	—	Reality
"D.O.G. in Me" (Public Announcement featuring Shaq)	1998		All Work, No Play
"MVPs" (Mr. Short Khop featuring Shaq)	2001		Da Khop Shop
"MVP" (Corey featuring Shaq)	2002		I'm Just Corey
"Zion" (Erick sermon featuring Shaq, David Banner & Xzibit)	2019		Vernia
"Shaq & Kobe" (remix) (Rick Ross and Meek Mill featuring Shaquille O'Neal and Dame D.O.L.L.A.)	2023	—	Too Good to Be True
"Lite It Up" (Redman featuring NJ All-Stars)	2024		Muddy Waters 2
"3 Lokos" (Coyote featuring Shaquille O’Neal)	2024		L.Aliens

== Music videos ==
Title	Year	Director(s)
"What's Up Doc?"	1993	Sarah Pirozek
"Shoot Pass Slam"	1993	Jim Swaffield
"I'm Outstanding"	1993	Jim Swaffield
"(I Know I Got) Skillz"	1993	Scott Kalvert
"No Hook"	1994	Lionel C. Martin
"Biological Didn't Bother"	1994	Lionel C. Martin
"You Can't Stop the Reign"	1996	Joseph Kahn
"Strait Playin'"	1997	Cameron Casey
"Connected"	2001	Marcus Warren

Music videos featured in

Title	Year	Artist(s)	Director(s)
"Make 'Em Say Uhh!"	1998	Master P featuring Fiend, Silkk the Shocker, Mia X & Mystikal	Michael Martin
"Still D.R.E."	1999	Dr. Dre featuring Snoop Dogg	Hype Williams
"That's How I Beat Shaq"	2001	Aaron Carter	Bernard Gourley
"You Wouldn't Believe"	2001	311	Mark Kohr
"Bad Boy for Life"	2001	P. Diddy, Black Rob and Mark Curry	Chris Robinson
"Dance with My Father"	2003	Luther Vandross	Diane Martel
"Vanilla Twilight"	2010	Owl City	Steve Hoover
"Don't Wanna Know"	2016	Maroon 5	David Dobkin
"My Cloud"	2018	Grabbitz	Zach Frank
"Todo de Ti"	2021	Rauw Alejandro	Marlon P
