= The Gorilla Mystery =

1930 film by Burt Gillett

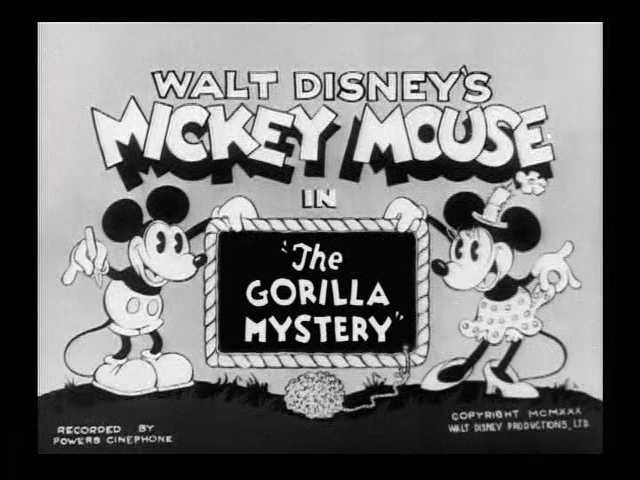
- Directed by: Burt Gillett
- Produced by: Walt Disney
- Music by: Bert Lewis
- Color process: Black and white
- Production company: Walt Disney Productions
- Distributed by: Columbia Pictures
- Release date: September 22, 1930
- Running time: 7:27
- Country: United States

The Gorilla Mystery is a 1930 American animated short film directed by Burt Gillett. It is the 22nd film of the Mickey Mouse series.

The short is a spoof of the 1925 play The Gorilla by Ralph Spence, which had been made into a 1927 silent film and a sound remake.

Due to being published in 1930, the cartoon entered the public domain on January 1, 2026.

The film

== Plot ==
Mickey Mouse reads in the newspaper that a gorilla has escaped from the zoo, and he calls Minnie to warn her. She is not afraid, and sings a song to Mickey over the phone. Then the gorilla breaks into her house and kidnaps her, and Mickey—hearing her screams over the telephone—rushes to save the damsel in distress. The gorilla takes Minnie upstairs to the attic and ties her up, then plays cat and mouse with Mickey. At the end, the gorilla trips over the rope, knocking him senseless. Mickey and Minnie dance to celebrate their narrow escape.

== Production ==
While the gorilla in the short isn't named, it was retroactively identified as the same gorilla seen in the 1933 shorts Mickey's Mechanical Man and The Pet Store, named Beppo.

The 1944 short Donald Duck and the Gorilla has a similar plot to this film, with a killer gorilla named Ajax escaping from the local zoo.

== Reception ==
In Mickey's Movies: The Theatrical Films of Mickey Mouse, Gijs Grob observes: "The Gorilla Mystery is noteworthy for the extensive dialogue in the beginning. By now the Disney animators had mastered lip-sync, and neither Mickey nor Minnie show any awkward faces while talking. Even more interesting is the cartoon's elaborately drawn gorilla, which in several scenes is staged to show its huge size. The gorilla and the clever use of light and shadow make The Gorilla Mystery look more sophisticated than earlier Mickey Mouse cartoons. Even The Fire Fighters of only three months earlier starts to look primitive".

Motion Picture News (December 6, 1930): "This is not up to the standard of other Mickey Mouse cartoons, but it is a good comedy, nevertheless. The telephone sequence is especially good".

== Voice cast ==
- Mickey Mouse: Walt Disney
- Minnie Mouse: Marcellite Garner
- Beppo the Gorilla: Purv Pullen
- Duck/Hens/Rooster: Larry Steers
- Parrot/Cucko: George Magrill

== Home media ==
The short was released on December 2, 2002, on Walt Disney Treasures: Mickey Mouse in Black and White.

== See also ==
- Mickey Mouse (film series)
