= Gorilla (disambiguation) =

The gorilla is a genus of great ape containing two extant species.

Gorilla, Gorillas, etc., may also refer to:

== Film ==
- The Gorilla (1927 film), a silent film based on the play.
- The Gorilla (1930 film), a sound remake of the 1927 film.
- The Gorilla (1939 film), a remake starring the Ritz Brothers.
- The Gorillas (film), a 1964 French comedy film.
- Gorilla (film), a 2019 Indian heist comedy film.

== Literature ==
- The Gorilla (play), a 1925 American play by Ralph Spence.
- Gorilla, a 1983 book by Anthony Browne.

== Music ==
- The Gorillas, also known as The Hammersmith Gorillas, a 1970s UK rock group.
- Gorillaz, an English music band created by Damon Albarn and Jamie Hewlett, which was originally named "Gorilla".

=== Albums ===
- Gorilla (Bonzo Dog Doo-Dah Band album), 1967.
- Gorilla (James Taylor album), 1975.
- Gorilla (EP), by Pentagon, 2017.
- Gorillaz (album), by Gorillaz, 2001.

=== Songs ===
- "Gorilla" (song), a 2013 song by Bruno Mars
- "Gorilla", a 1969 song by Warren Zevon from Wanted Dead or Alive.
- "If You Could See Her (The Gorilla Song)", a song from the musical Cabaret.
- "Gorilla", a 1987 song by Doctor and the Medics from I Keep Thinking It's Tuesday.
- "The Gorilla Song", a 1994 song by Raffi from Bananaphone.

== Other uses ==
- Gorilla (advertisement), a 2007 advertisement for Cadbury Dairy Milk in the United Kingdom.
- Gorillas (video game), a 1991 computer game.
- Gorillas (company), an on-demand grocery delivery company.
- Gorilla (sculpture), a sculpture by David Wynne .
- Josiah Judah or the Gorilla, American super middleweight boxer.
- Gorilla, a BBC Two station ident from 1997 until 2001.
- A nickname for Richard S. Fuld Jr..
- The mascot of the Phoenix Suns.

== People with the name ==
- Gorilla Monsoon, American professional wrestler.
- Gorilla Zoe, American rapper.

== See also ==
- 800-pound gorilla
- 100 men versus a gorilla
- Garrison's Gorillas, a 1967 American TV series.
- Gorilla Glass, a brand of specialized toughened glass.
- Gorilla Glue, a glue product.
- Gorilla suit, a full bodied costume.
- Gorilla Warfare (disambiguation)
- Guerrilla (disambiguation)
- Magilla Gorilla, the main character of The Magilla Gorilla Show.
- The Magilla Gorilla Show, an animated television series.
