= Shaquille O'Neal Presents His Superfriends, Vol. 1 =

Studio album by Shaquille O'Neal
- Released: 2001 (scheduled)
- Recorded: 1999–2001
- Genres: Hip hop; West Coast hip hop
- Labels: Trauma; T.W.IsM.; Fireworks Distribution
- Producers: Shaquille O'Neal (exec.); Dr. Dre; Big Tank; Soopafly; Darrell Diaz; L. T. Hutton; Daz Dillinger; Chris Goodman; Denaun Porter; Rick Rock; Amir Questlove; Che Pope

Shaquille O'Neal chronology
Respect (1998)	Shaquille O'Neal Presents His Superfriends, Vol. 1 (2001)	Gorilla Warfare (2023)

Shaquille O'Neal Presents His Superfriends, Vol. 1 is an unreleased album by Shaquille O'Neal. Completed in 2001, it was intended to be the NBA star's fifth solo album. Producers for the album included Denaun Porter, Big Tank, L. T. Hutton, Rick Rock, and Dr. Dre. The original release date was slated for September 11, 2001, but was pushed back to October 9 of the same year. After much delay, the album was completely abandoned and never released.

== Background ==
O'Neal had released four albums before Superfriends: 1993's platinum-certified Shaq Diesel; 1994's platinum-certified Shaq-Fu: Da Return; 1996's gold-certified Can't Stop the Reign; and 1998's Respect. O'Neal also released a "Best Of" album that debuted in 1996.

O'Neal originally began the "Superfriends" project telling The Source Magazine that the album was going to be "revolutionary" and that he wanted to "bring together all genres." In 2000, he told the New York Times that he was working on negotiations with Pink, Limp Bizkit, Dr. Dre, and George Clinton. Although Shaq did not land all of the performers he had in mind, he still managed to gather a notable cast of "Superfriends."

When I decided to record this album I wanted to make it a collaboration of various styles of rap and voices of thought. I wanted to include talented artists both mainstream and underground. I wanted to celebrate the essence and energy of rap that is created by people from different walks of life. I like the mainstream MCs with their jiggy style and the underground MCs who speak conscious rap.

In 2001, Shaquille O'Neal performed a rendition of Rob Base and DJ E-Z Rock's platinum 1988 hit "It Takes Two" at the Los Angeles Lakers back-to-back championship victory parade in front of the Los Angeles Staples Center. It was later stated in an interview that O'Neal had already begun production for the track after the Lakers first championship win in 2000. The song was scheduled to a part of his "Superfriends" compilation and featured vocalist Nicole Scherzinger (formerly from Eden's Crush and now of The Pussycat Dolls).

== Contributors ==
As the title suggests, the album was to host many of Shaq's musical associates. Scheduled to appear on the album were Nate Dogg, R.L. of Next, Peter Gunz, Fieldy of Korn, Thor-El, Dr. Dre, Shawn Stockman of Boyz II Men, Lord Tariq, 112, Jayo Felony, WC of Westside Connection, Trina, Ludacris, Joi of Lucy Pearl, Black Star, Nicole Scherzinger, Common, Black Thought of The Roots, Nick Hexum and Chad Sexton of 311, Black Rob, Twista, George Clinton, Memphis Bleek, Snoop Dogg, and Angie Stone.

== Singles ==
Because the project was abandoned, the only available music from album was released in singles by Fireworks Productions. Most of the singles that were released were only given to "Shaq Team" members, a group of the American public that volunteered to promote and distribute the material. Singles were released on both 12" vinyl and compact discs.

The first single off the "Superfriends" album, "Connected," was a West Coast success. The song received large radio play from California hip-hop stations such as Power 106, KDAY, and 100.3 The Beat. The following singles "Do It Faster" and "In the Sun" were not as well received.

== Reception ==
Professional ratings
Review scores
Source	Rating
AllMusic	4/5 stars

Music may be Shaq's hobby, but he doesn't mess around. Shaquille O'Neal Presents His Superfriends, Vol. 1 likely won't appeal to any new fans. But those who have been along for the ride will be rewarded with his new CD.

— J.T. Griffith, AllMusic

== Track listing ==
No.	Title	Producer(s)	Length
1.	"That's Me" (unreleased, featuring Dr. Dre)	Dr. Dre
2.	"Connected" (featuring Nate Dogg, WC)	Big Tank
3.	"Bounce" (featuring Jayo Felony, Peter Gunz)
4.	"Make It Hot" (featuring Peter Gunz, Big Tank)
5.	"Strawberry Letter" (featuring Shawn Stockman)
6.	"I Don't Care" (featuring R.L.)
7.	"Do It Faster" (featuring Twista, Trina)
8.	"Atomic Dog" (unreleased, featuring George Clinton, Snoop Dogg)
9.	"In the Sun" (featuring Common, Black Thought, Joi)	Questlove
10.	"Y'all Don't Really Want It" (featuring Black Rob, Thor-El)
11.	"The One" (unreleased, featuring Shawn Stockman)
12.	"Big Hat Club" (unreleased, featuring Ludacris)
13.	"Psycho" (featuring Fieldy, Nick Hexum, Chad Sexton)
14.	"All in a Day" (featuring Black Star, Common, Angie Stone)
15.	"No Words" (featuring 112)

=== Cut tracks ===
- "You'd Be Lyin'" (featuring Peter Gunz)
- "I Don't Give a Fuck" (featuring The Lady of Rage)
- "4 Commandments" (featuring Sixx John)
- "It Takes Two" (featuring Nicole Scherzinger) (*)
