= Guerrilla (disambiguation) =

A guerrilla is an individual or group engaged in irregular warfare and combat.

Guerrilla may also refer to:

== Film and television ==
- Guerrilla filmmaking, a form of independent filmmaking characterized by low budgets
- Guerrilla, the subtitle for part two of the 2008 biopic Che about Che Guevara starring Benicio del Toro
- Guerrilla (1985 film), an Indian Malayalam film
- Guerrilla (2011 film), a Bangladeshi film about the Liberation war of Bangladesh
- Guerrilla (TV series), a 2017 British drama
- The Guerrilla (1908 film), a silent film directed by D. W. Griffith
- The Guerrilla (1973 film), a French-Spanish film

== Music ==
- Guerrilla gig, a type of concert performed in a non-traditional setting or arranged in an unusual fashion
- Guerrilla (album), a 1999 album by Super Furry Animals
- Guerilla Records, [sic] a British record label
- "Guerrilla", a 2022 song by Ateez

== Gaming ==
- Red Faction: Guerrilla, a 2009 open world video game with destructible environment
- Guerrilla Games, a Dutch video game developer

== Other uses ==
- Guerrillas (novel), a 1975 novel by V.S. Naipaul
- Guerrilla communication, a method of intervening in the process of communication to provoke subversive effects
- Guerrilla gardening, gardening on land that is not normally used for that
- Guerrilla marketing, an unconventional system of promotions on a very low budget
- Guerrilla diplomacy, a method of diplomacy and an alternative approach to international relations
- Guerilla (newspaper) a Toronto underground newspaper published from the 1970 to 1974

== See also ==
- Guerrilla Unit
- Guerrilla Warfare (disambiguation)
- Gorilla Warfare (disambiguation)
- Gorilla (disambiguation)
