= The Best of Shaquille O'Neal =

Greatest hits album by Shaquille O'Neal
- Released: November 12, 1996
- Recorded: 1993–1994
- Genre: Rap
- Length: 48:05
- Label: Jive Records
- Producer: Def Jef; Redman; Erick Sermon; Warren G

Shaquille O'Neal chronology
Shaq-Fu: Da Return (1994)	The Best of Shaquille O'Neal (1996)	You Can't Stop the Reign (1996)

Professional ratings
Review scores
Source	Rating
Allmusic	4/5 stars

The Best of Shaquille O'Neal is the first compilation and third overall album by NBA player/rapper, Shaquille O'Neal. The album was released on November 12, 1996, just days before his third studio album, You Can't Stop the Reign, and was his last for Jive Records. Due to its release date, the album only featured songs from his first two albums, Shaq Diesel and Shaq-Fu: Da Return, as well as the Fu-Schnickens song, "What Up Doc? (Can We Rock)" from their album Nervous Breakdown.

== Track listing ==
1. "I'm Outstanding"- 4:07
2. "Shoot Pass Slam"- 3:30
3. "What's Up Doc? (Can We Rock?)" feat. Fu-Schnickens- 3:53
4. "Biological Didn't Bother" (G-Funk Version)- 5:07
5. "Mic Check 1-2" feat. Ill Al Skratch- 3:47
6. "Where Ya At?" feat. Phife Dawg- 4:45
7. "(I Know I Got) Skillz" feat. Def Jef- 4:23
8. "No Hook" feat. RZA & Method Man- 3:17
9. "Boom"- 3:00
10. "Newark to C.I." feat. Keith Murray- 3:57
11. "My Style, My Stelo" feat. Erick Sermon & Redman- 3:41
12. "Biological Didn't Bother (Original Flow)"- 4:38
