= Julio G =

American radio DJ

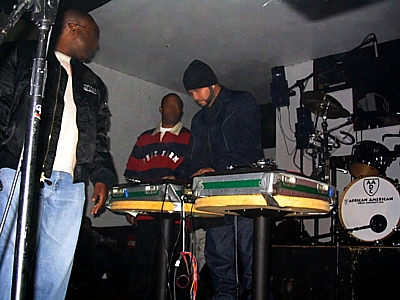
- Julio G in 2003
- Born: Julio Gonzalez; Lynwood, California
- Occupation(s): Radio presenter, Disc jockey
- Known for: Presenting shows on KDAY, and performing on records by Def Jef, touring with Cypress Hill and presenting the fictional Radio Los Santos in the 2004 video game Grand Theft Auto: San Andreas

Julio Gonzalez better known as Julio G (born 1969 in Lynwood, California) is an American radio DJ, musician and actor known for his influence on the West Coast Hip Hop scene, particularly on KDAY.

He was featured on Def Jef's 1989 debut album Just a Poet with Soul, as well as the 1990 Kid Frost album Hispanic Causing Panic.

He made his acting debut in the 2001 film, The Wash. From 2004 - 2014, Gonzalez was a touring DJ with Cypress Hill.

== Voice acting ==
Julio G is the host of the Radio Los Santos radio station in the 2004 video game Grand Theft Auto: San Andreas.
