= The Way It's Goin' Down =

"The Way It's Goin Down"

Single by Shaquille O'Neal featuring Peter Gunz

from the album Respect
- Released: July 27, 1998
- Recorded: 1997
- Studio: Larrabee Sound Studios (West Hollywood, CA); Skip Saylor Recording (Hollywood, CA)
- Genre: Hip hop
- Length: 4:29
- Label: T.W.IsM. Records
- Songwriters: Shaquille O'Neal; Peter Pankey; David Blake
- Producer: DJ Quik

Shaquille O'Neal singles chronology
"Men of Steel" (1997)	"The Way It's Goin Down" (1998)	"Connected" (2001)

"The Way It's Goin' Down" (subtitled Twism for Life) is a hip hop song performed by American rappers Shaquille O'Neal and Peter Gunz. It was released on July 27, 1998 via T.W.IsM. Records as the lead single from O'Neal's fourth studio album Respect. Recording sessions took place at Larrabee Sound Studios and Skip Saylor Recording in Hollywood. Written by O'Neal, Gunz and DJ Quik, it was produced by the latter.

In the United States, the song peaked at number 47 on the R&B/Hip-Hop Airplay and number 39 on the Mainstream R&B/Hip-Hop Airplay charts. It found more success in the United Kingdom, reaching number 62 on the UK singles chart, number 35 on the Official Dance Singles Chart and number 13 on the Official Hip Hop and R&B Singles Chart.

The song became Shaq's second straight solo single to feature Peter Gunz and DJ Quik after "Strait Playin'". The trio performed the song live on The Tonight Show with Jay Leno in 1998.

== Track listing ==
No.	Title	Length
1.	"The Way It's Goin' Down (Twism For Life)" (LP Version)
2.	"The Way It's Goin' Down (Twism For Life)" (Radio Edit)
3.	"The Way It's Goin' Down (Twism For Life)" (Instrumental)
4.	"The Way It's Goin' Down (Twism For Life)" (A Cappella)

== Personnel ==
- Shaquille O'Neal – rap vocals
- Peter "Peter Gunz" Pankey – rap vocals
- David "DJ Quik" Blake – producer, recording, mixing
- Chris Puram – recording, mixing, executive producer (track 1)
- George "G-1" Archie – recording, mixing
- Tom Sturges – executive producer
- Ken Bailey – executive producer (tracks: 2–4)

== Charts ==
Chart (1998)	Peak position
UK Singles (Official Charts)	62
UK Dance (Official Charts)	35
UK Hip Hop/R&B (Official Charts)	13
US R&B/Hip-Hop Airplay (Billboard)	47
