= (I Know I Got) Skillz =

Single by Shaquille O'Neal

Single by Shaquille O'Neal featuring Def Jef

from the album Shaq Diesel
- Released: September 7, 1993
- Recorded: 1993
- Genre: Hip hop
- Length: 4:23
- Label: Jive
- Songwriters: Shaquille O'Neal; Def Jef
- Producers: Def Jef; Meech Wells

Shaquille O'Neal singles chronology
"What's Up Doc? (Can We Rock)" (1993)	"(I Know I Got) Skillz" (1993)	"I'm Outstanding" (1993)

Music video
- "(I Know I Got) Skillz" on YouTube

"(I Know I Got) Skillz" is the debut single released from American NBA star and rapper Shaquille O'Neal's debut album, Shaq Diesel (1993). The song, which saw its official release on September 7, 1993 by Jive Records, was produced by Def Jef and Meech Wells and featured a guest verse from Def Jef as well. It samples "It's My Thing" by EPMD and "Large Professor" by Main Source. "(I Know I Got) Skillz" was a success, peaking at 35 and 32 on the US Billboard Hot 100 and Cash Box Top 100, becoming Shaq's only solo top-40 hit in the US, although he managed to avoid one hit wonder status as he previously scored a hit as a featured guest on the Fu-Schnickens hit "What's Up Doc? (Can We Rock)". The single was certified gold by the RIAA on December 21, 1993, for shipping of 500,000 copies. The accompanying music video was directed by Scott Kalvert. The song was also featured on Shaq's compilation album, The Best of Shaquille O'Neal and appeared in the film Pineapple Express. Shaq performed the track at Lollapallooza 2019 in Grant Park, Chicago.

== Single track listing ==
=== A-side ===
1. "(I Know I Got) Skillz" (LP / radio version)- 4:23
2. "(I Know I Got) Skillz" (remix)- 4:23

=== B-side ===
1. "(I Know I Got) Skillz" (LP / radio instrumental)- 4:08
2. "(I Know I Got) Skillz" (remix instrumental)- 4:18

== Charts ==
Chart (1993–1994)	Peak position
US Billboard Hot 100	35
US Hot R&B/Hip-Hop Singles & Tracks (Billboard)	20
US Hot Rap Singles (Billboard)	3
US Hot Dance Music/Maxi-Singles Sales (Billboard)	25
US Cash Box Top 100	32

== Certifications ==
Region	Certification	Certified units/sales
United States (RIAA)	Gold	500,000^{^}
^{^} Shipments figures based on certification alone.
