= Steel (soundtrack) =

Music From And Inspired By The Motion Picture Steel

Soundtrack album by various artists
- Released: July 29, 1997
- Recorded: 1996–97
- Genre: Hip hop; R&B
- Length: 52:07
- Label: Qwest; Warner Bros.
- Producer: Andre Betts; Antonina Armato; Darryl Anthony Hawes; DJ Quik; G-One; Havoc; Hen-Gee; Jon-John; Marc Kinchen; Oliver Leiber; Poke & Tone; Teddy Riley

Singles from Steel
- 1. "Strait Playin'" Released: January 18, 1997; 2. "Men of Steel" Released: July 29, 1997

Professional ratings
Review scores
Source	Rating
AllMusic	4/5 stars

Music From And Inspired By The Motion Picture Steel is the soundtrack to Kenneth Johnson's 1997 superhero film Steel. It was released on July 29, 1997, through Qwest/Warner Bros. Records. Production was handled by Jon-John, Antonina Armato, Andre Betts, Darryl Anthony Hawes, DJ Quik, G-1, Havoc, Hen-Gee, Marc Kinchen, Oliver Leiber, Teddy Riley and Trackmasters. It features contributions from the film star Shaquille O'Neal, Peter Gunz, Az Yet, Blackstreet, B-Real, Gina Breedlove, Ice Cube, Jia, Jon B., KRS-One, Maria Christina, Mobb Deep, S.H.E., Spice 1 and Tevin Campbell. The album reached number 185 on the Billboard 200 and number 26 on the Top R&B/Hip-Hop Albums charts in the United States. Its lead single, a posse cut "Men of Steel", peaked at number 82 on the Billboard Hot 100 and number 53 on the Hot R&B/Hip-Hop Songs in the US.

Kansas City rapper Tech N9ne had written and recorded a song for the film titled "Strange", but the song was not included.

== Track listing ==
No.	Title	Writer(s)	Producer(s)	Length
1.	"Mobb of Steel" (performed by Mobb Deep)	Kejuan Muchita; Albert Johnson	Havoc	3:56
2.	"No More Fighting" (performed by Tevin Campbell)	Antonina Armato; Warryn Campbell	Jon-John; Ian Alexander (co.)	4:15
3.	"Strait Playin' (Superman Remix)" (performed by Shaquille O'Neal)	Shaquille O'Neal; Peter Pankey; David Blake; George Archie; Sean Hamilton	DJ Quik; G-One	3:43
4.	"Breakout" (performed by Jia)	Marc Kinchen; Latrece Kinchen; Lotonia Saunderson	Marc Kinchen	3:59
5.	"Anything for Your Love" (performed by Jon B.)	Joey Elias; Darryl Anthony Hawes; Gloria Stewart	Jon-John; Darryl Anthony Hawes	4:15
6.	"Free to Be Me" (performed by Gina Breedlove)	Gina Breedlove; Andre Betts	Andre Betts	5:25
7.	"Men of Steel" (performed by Shaquille O'Neal, Ice Cube, B-Real, Peter Gunz and KRS-One)	O'Neal; O'Shea Jackson; Louis Freese; Pankey; Lawrence Parker; Samuel Barnes; Jean-Claude Olivier	Poke and Tone; Ken Ross (exec.)	4:35
8.	"We've Got Heart" (performed by S.H.E.)	Armato	Antonina Armato	3:54
9.	"Coming Home to You" (performed by Blackstreet)	Teddy Riley; Chauncey Hannibal; Karen Anderson; Markell Riley	Teddy Riley; Chauncey Hannibal (co.)	4:48
10.	"Nothing Compares" (performed by Az Yet)	Jonathan Robinson	Jon-John; Joey Elias (co.)	4:44
11.	"Alone in the Crowd" (performed by Maria Christina)	Armato; Oliver Leiber	Antonina Armato; Oliver Leiber	5:02
12.	"Mind on My Money" (performed by Spice 1)	Robert Lee Green Jr.; Henry Garcia; Jean-Yves G. Ducornet	Hen-Gee; Jeeve (co.)	3:31
Total length:				52:07

Notes

- Tracks 1, 4–7, 9–12 did not appear in the film. Instead, Young MC's "Bust a Move", Kenny Lamar's "Bust That Rhythm", James Brown's "I Got You (I Feel Good)", Mobb Deep's "More Trife Life", Rodney Jerkins' "Dark Energy" and Marvin Winans' "Steel Yourself" can be heard in the actual film.

== Charts ==
Chart (1997)	Peak position
US Billboard 200	185
US Top R&B Albums (Billboard)	28
