= Guerrilla Warfare (disambiguation) =

Guerrilla warfare is irregular warfare and combat.

Guerrilla Warfare or Guerrilla War may also refer to:

- Guerrilla Warfare (book), a 1961 book by Che Guevara
- Guerrilla Warfare (album), a 1999 musical album by Hot Boys
- Guerrilla War (video game), a 1987 run and gun video game

== See also ==
- Guerrilla (disambiguation)
- Gorilla Warfare (disambiguation)
