= Biological Didn't Bother =

Single by Shaquille O'Neal

from the album Shaq Fu: Da Return
- Released: October 17, 1994
- Recorded: 1994
- Genre: Hip hop
- Length: 5:07
- Label: Jive
- Songwriter: Shaquille O'Neal
- Producers: Warren G (g-funk version); The LG Experience (original version)

Shaquille O'Neal singles chronology
"Shoot Pass Slam" (1994)	"Biological Didn't Bother" (1994)	"No Hook" (1995)

Music video
- "Biological Didn't Bother (G-Funk Version)" on YouTube

"Biological Didn't Bother" is the first single released from Shaquille O'Neal's second album, Shaq Fu: Da Return. It was released on October 17, 1994 with production from the LG Experience and Warren G. The single was a minor success, making it to number 78 on the Billboard Hot 100. The song is dedicated to Shaq's stepfather, Phillip A. Harrison, and samples "They Reminisce Over You (T.R.O.Y.)" by Pete Rock & CL Smooth.

== Music video ==
The music video portrays a simplified biography of O'Neal's early days living in Newark, New Jersey. It discusses his estrangement from his biological father Joseph Toney, with whom he would not reconcile until 2016. O'Neal refers to his stepfather Phillip A. Harrison with the lyrics, "Phil is my father."

The song is referenced by Roger in season 7 of American Dad! during the episode "Seasons Beatings".

== Samples ==
This song samples a line from the song "They Reminisce Over You" by Pete Rock & CL Smooth in which CL Smooth raps the line "Biological Didn't Bother" in the second verse.

== Single track listing ==
=== A-Side ===
1. "Biological Didn't Bother" (G-Funk Version)- 5:07
2. "Biological Didn't Bother" (Original Flow)- 4:39
3. "Biological Didn't Bother" (Dr. Ceuss Remix)- 4:45

=== B-Side ===
1. "Biological Didn't Bother" (Straight From Tha Funk Crib Remix)- 5:13
2. "Biological Didn't Bother" (G-Funk Instrumental)- 5:07
3. "Biological Didn't Bother" (Original Flow Instrumental)- 4:39

== Charts ==
Chart (1994)	Peak position
UK Hip Hop/R&B (Official Charts)	23
