= Just a Poet with Soul =

Studio album by Def Jef
- Released: November 14, 1989
- Recorded: 1988–89
- Genre: Hip hop
- Length: 51:25
- Label: Delicious Vinyl
- Producers: Def Jef; Dust Brothers; Michael Ross

Def Jef chronology
| Just a Poet with Soul (1989) | Soul Food (1991) |

Singles from Just a Poet with Soul
- 1. "Droppin Rhymes on Drums" Released: November 6, 1989; 2. "Black to the Future" Released: May 7, 1990; 3. "Poet with Soul" Released: July 1, 1991

Just a Poet with Soul is the debut studio album by American rapper and record producer Def Jef. It was released on November 14, 1989, through Delicious Vinyl. The album was produced by the Dust Brothers, Def Jef, and Michael Ross, who also served as executive producer. It features contributions from N'Dea Davenport and Etta James on vocals, Kevin O'Neal on bass, Michael Kory on piano, and Julio G on turntables. The album produced three singles: "Droppin Rhymes on Drums", "Black to the Future" and "Poet with Soul".

== Critical reception ==
Professional ratings
Review scores
| Source | Rating |
|---|---|
| AllMusic | 4.5/5 stars |
| Los Angeles Times | 3.5/5 stars |
| The Village Voice | B+ |

The Houston Chronicle opined that Def Jef "spends more time bragging about how cleverly he can say what he says than he does actually saying anything—an all-too-common rap trick... But the album is redeemed as entertainment by the Dust Brothers' funky Cali co-production and inventive use of sampling."

== Track listing ==
| No. | Title | Writer(s) | Producer(s) | Length |
|---|---|---|---|---|
| 1. | "Droppin' Rhymes on Drums" (featuring Etta James) | Jeffrey Fortson; Eric Harris | Def Jef | 4:21 |
| 2. | "Givin'em Rhythm" | Fortson; Erick Vaan | Def Jef; D.J. Eric Vaan^{[a]} | 4:09 |
| 3. | "On the Real Tip" | Fortson | Def Jef | 4:09 |
| 4. | "Poet with Soul" | Fortson | Def Jef | 4:12 |
| 5. | "Give It Here" | Fortson; Peter Brown | Def Jef; Dust Brothers^{[c]} | 4:07 |
| 6. | "Do You Wanna Get Housed" | Fortson | Def Jef | 4:42 |
| 7. | "Black to the Future" | Fortson | Def Jef | 5:16 |
| 8. | "Do It Baby" (featuring N'Dea Davenport) | Fortson; John King; Matt Dike; Michael Simpson | Dust Brothers | 6:17 |
| 9. | "God Made Me Funky" | Fortson; Kevin O'Neal; King; Simpson | Dust Brothers; Def Jef^{[c]} | 3:57 |
| 10. | "Downtown" | Fortson; Dike; Michael Ross | Def Jef | 4:30 |
| 11. | "Just a Poet" | Fortson; King; Dike; Ross | Dust Brothers; Michael Ross | 5:26 |

Notes

- ^{^[a]} signifies an assistant producer.
- ^{^[c]} signifies a co-producer.

== Personnel ==
- Jeffrey "Def Jef" Fortson – vocals, producer (tracks: 1–7, 10), co-producer (track 9), sleeve notes
- Etta James – additional vocals (track 1)
- Julio "Julio G." Gonzalez – scratches (track 5)
- N'Dea Davenport – vocals (track 8)
- Kevin O'Neal – bass (track 9)
- Michael Kory – piano (track 11)
- DJ Erick Vaan – assistant producer (track 2)
- John "King Gizmo" King – producer (tracks: 8, 9, 11), co-producer (track 5)
- Matt Dike – producer (tracks: 8, 9, 11), co-producer (track 5)
- Michael "E.Z. Mike" Simpson – producer (tracks: 8, 9, 11), co-producer (track 5)
- Michael Ross – producer (track 11), executive producer
- Brian Foxworthy – engineering
- Mario Caldato Jr. – engineering
- Darren Mora – additional engineering
- Salomon Emquies – art direction, photography
