= Deadly Venoms =

American all-female hip hop group

- Genres: Hip Hop
- Years active: 1993–2002
- Labels: A&M/PolyGram Records; DreamWorks/Interscope/Universal Records; Rocks the World/Caroline/Virgin/EMI Records; Famous Records Corp.
- Past members: N-Tyce; Champ MC; J-Boo; Finesse; Lin Que

Deadly Venoms is an American Wu-Tang Clan-affiliated all-female hip hop group formed in 1997 consisting of N-Tyce, J-Boo, Champ MC, and Finesse. X Clan-affiliated rapper Lin Que was initially intended to be part of the group but departed soon after its inception due to business decisions. Each member of the group were experienced rappers prior to joining the collective. Finesse recorded an album with rapper Synquis named Soul Sisters in 1988, Champ released her debut album Ghetto Flava on East West America/Atlantic Records, and N-Tyce was signed to Wild Pitch/EMI in the mid 1990s and released a few singles including the RZA-produced "Hush Hush Tip" featuring Method Man. The Deadly Venoms was J-Boo's professional introduction.

A legal dispute with A&M/PolyGram Records and the then-forthcoming merger between the MCA and PolyGram families of labels that formed the Universal Music Group forced its debut album, Antidote, to remain in its vaults, although the single “One More to Go” (featuring Inspectah Deck, Method Man, Cappadonna, Street Life, and GZA) b/w “Bomb Threat,” was released and the album was later leaked. Despite not being properly released, the album got positive reviews. The group was also featured on NBA All-Star and rapper Shaquille O'Neal's 1998 album Respect. Deadly Venoms' second album, Pretty Thugs, was also never properly released because of similar label disputes, this time with DreamWorks/Interscope/Universal Records. However, as with Antidote, copies of the record were leaked, and a promo CD was pressed.

After the departure of Finesse due to undisclosed business reasons, the group finally managed to release an album with 2002's Still Standing, on Rocks the World/Caroline/Virgin/EMI Records. Pretty Thugs, however, was finally released in 2017 with the title Venom Everywhere as a digital download on Famous Records Corp.

== Discography ==
=== Albums ===
- The Antidote (1998) (A&M/PolyGram Records 540 962, unreleased)
- Pretty Thugs (2000) (DreamWorks/Interscope/Universal Records 450 244, unreleased)
- Still Standing (2002) (Rocks the World/Caroline/Virgin/EMI Records 8236 6 60001 2 8, 2002)

=== Singles ===
- "One More to Go" (1998)
- "Venom Everywhere" (1999)
- "Don't Give Up" (2000)
