= Soul Food (Def Jef album) =

Studio album by Def Jef
- Released: September 22, 1991
- Recorded: 1990–91
- Genre: Hip hop
- Label: Delicious Vinyl
- Producers: Def Jef, DJ Mark the 45 King, Brand New Heavies, Devastatin'

Def Jef chronology
Just a Poet with Soul (1989)	Soul Food (1991)

Soul Food is the second album by the American musician Def Jef. It was released on September 22, 1991, on Delicious Vinyl, and featured production from Def Jef, DJ Mark the 45 King, Brand New Heavies, and Devastatin'. Two singles were released, "Here We Go Again" and "Cali's All That". Def Jef promoted the album by touring with Brand New Heavies.

== Critical reception ==
Professional ratings
Review scores
Source	Rating
AllMusic	3/5 stars
Robert Christgau	(1-star Honorable Mention)

The Washington Post wrote that "Def Jef's black nationalist microphone rhetoric, his intellectually challenging lyrics and his hardy, Bronx-accented voice rival the skills of other rapping activists such as KRS-One and Public Enemy's Chuck D." The State determined that Def Jef "takes his poetry more seriously than the other MCs... Not only do the words mean more, the backing tracks are also spicier, laced with tasty nuggets of funk and classic R&B."

== Track listing ==
1. "A Poet's Prelude" - 1:43
2. "Get Up 4 the Get Down" - 3:46
3. "Soul Provider" - 4:00
4. "Here We Go Again" - 4:09
5. "Cali's All That" - 4:52 (featuring Tone Loc)
6. "Brand New Heavy Freestyle" - 4:54 (featuring the Brand New Heavies)
7. "Soul Is Back" - 4:51
8. "Shadow of Def" - 4:18
9. "Fa Sho Shot" - 4:45
10. "Don't Sleep (Open Your Eyes)" - 3:30
11. "Soul Food (A Hip Hop Duet)" - 4:38 (featuring Funkytown Pros)
12. "Voice of a New Generation" - 5:44
13. "God Complex" - 4:07

== Samples ==
Here We Go Again

- "Here We Go (Live at the Funhouse)" by Run-DMC
- "Children's Story" by Slick Rick

Cali's All That

- "8th Wonder" by Sugarhill Gang
- "Bon Bon Vie" by T.S. Monk
- "West Coast Poplock" by Ronnie Hudson & the Street People

Soul Is Back

- "Drumbeat" by Jim Ingram
- "Blow Your Head" by Fred Wesley and the J.B.'s

Fa Sho Shot

- "Shack Up" by Banbarra
- "(Every Time I Turn Around) Back in Love Again" by L.T.D.

Soul Food

- "The Thrill Is Gone" by B.B. King
- "Think (About It)" by Lyn Collins
