= Gina Breedlove =

American singer, songwriter, and actress

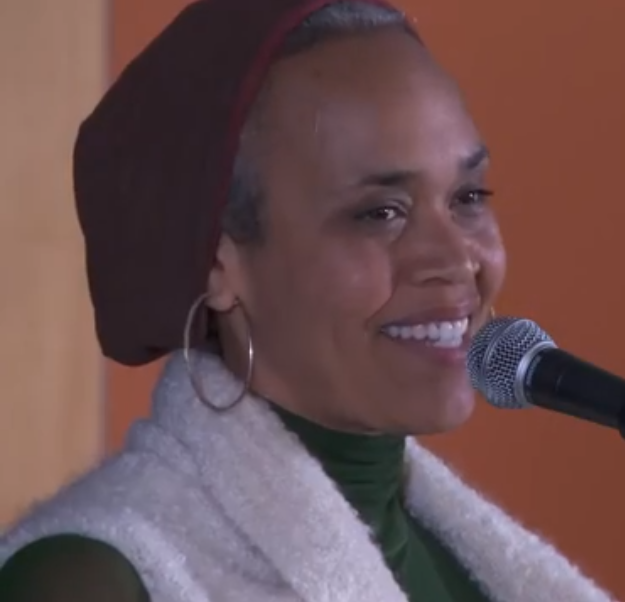
- Performing at the San Francisco Public Library in 2016
- Born: Brooklyn, New York, US
- Occupations: Stage actress, singer, songwriter
- Years active: 1987–present
- Website: www.ginabreedlove.com

Gina Louise Breedlove is an American singer, songwriter and stage actress.

== Work ==
In 1997, she originated the role of Sarabi in the Broadway production of The Lion King. She has appeared in the 1987 Broadway musical Sophisticated Ladies. Breedlove sang in 1995 with Harry Belafonte at the Orange County Performing Arts Center in Costa Mesa, where their duets on "Skin to Skin" and "How Do You Keep the Music Playing?" were praised by the Los Angeles Times. In 1996, she was part of the cast of Sheila's Day. She also contributed a song to the soundtrack of the 1997 Shaquille O'Neal film Steel.
