= Gorilla Warfare =

Gorilla Warfare or Gorilla War—a pun on the phrase guerrilla warfare—may refer to:

- "Gorilla Warfare" (Dad's Army), episode 3 of season 7 (1974)
- "Gorilla Warfare" (The Flash), episode 7 of season 2 (2015)
- "Gorilla Warfare" (Beast Wars), episode 10 of season 1 (1996)
- "JLApe: Gorilla Warfare!", a 1999 DC Comics crossover event
- Gorilla Warfare, a 2014 storyline in The Flash comic book series
- GorillaWarfare (Molly White), an American software engineer, Wikipedia editor, and cryptocurrency critic
- Gorilla Warfare (album), a 2023 album by Shaquille O'Neal
- The Navy Seal copypasta is sometimes referred to as "Gorilla Warfare" because of a misspelling contained within.
- "Gorilla War", an episode of the 2019 TV series Ghosts
- "Gorilla War", an episode of the documentary series Shadow Force
- "Gorilla War", a documentary co-directed by Alfred de Montesquiou

== See also ==
- Guerrilla Warfare (disambiguation)
- Gorilla (disambiguation)
- Chimpanzee war
