= Joe Frisco =

American actor

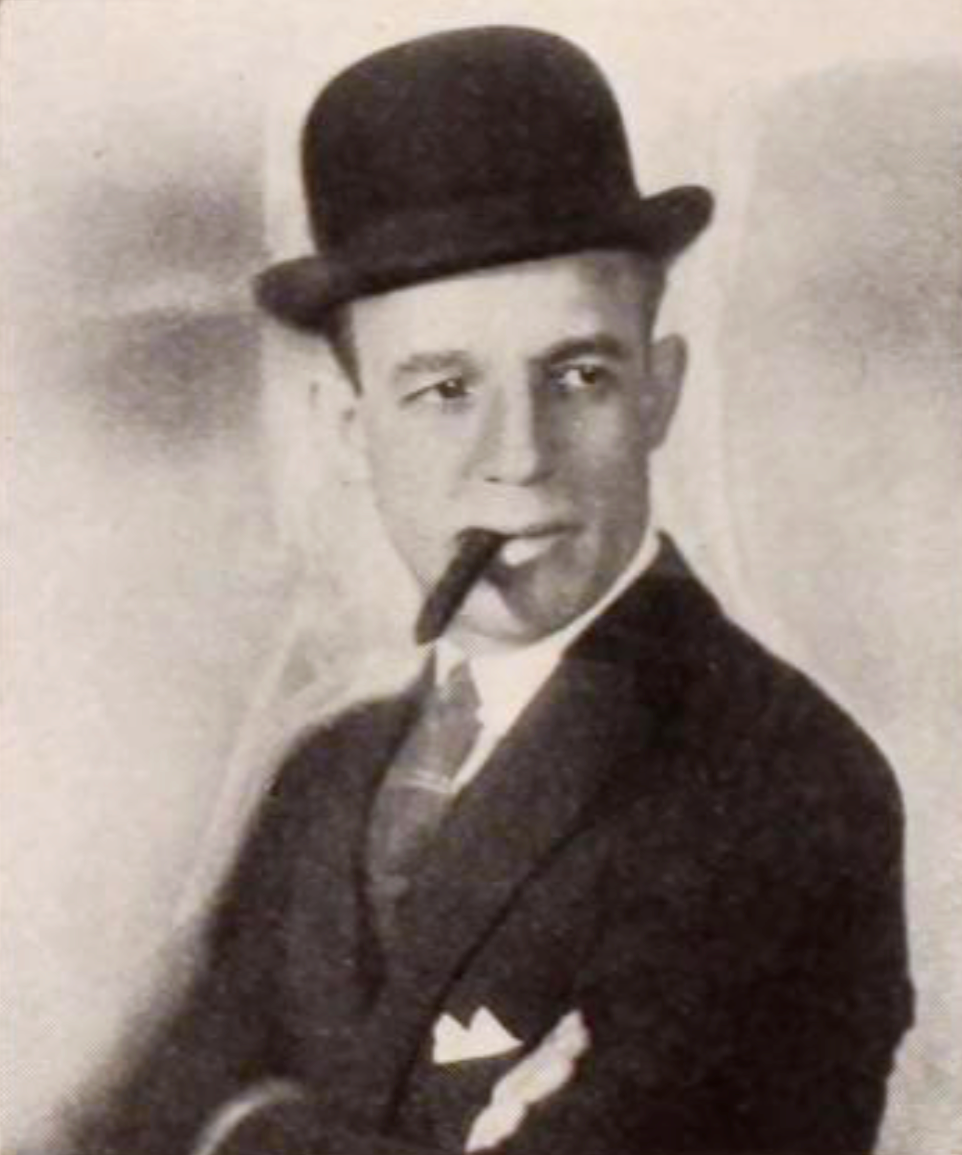
Joe Frisco in 1923.

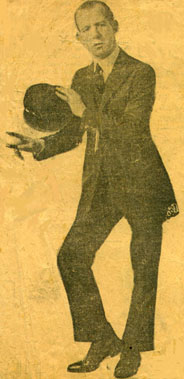
Joe Frisco in the 1910s

Joe Frisco (born Louis Wilson Joseph; November 4, 1889 – February 18, 1958) was an American vaudeville performer who first made his name on stage as a jazz dancer, but later incorporated his stuttering voice to his act and became a popular comedian.

== Life and career ==
He was born Louis Wilson Joseph in Milan, Illinois on November 4, 1889. In the mid and late 1910s, he performed with some of the first jazz bands in Chicago and New York City, including Tom Brown's Band from Dixieland, the Original Dixieland Jass Band, and the Louisiana Five. He made his Broadway debut in the Ziegfeld Follies in 1918. Frisco was a mainstay on the vaudeville circuit in the 1920s and 1930s. His popular jazz dance act, called by some the "Jewish Charleston", was a choreographed series of shuffles, camel walks and turns. It was usually performed to Darktown Strutters' Ball. It, or at least a minute or so of it, can be seen in the film Atlantic City (1944). He typically wore a derby hat, and had a king-sized cigar in his mouth as he danced. He often performed in front of a backing danceline of beautiful women wearing leotards, short jackets and bowler hats—and "puffing" on big prop cigars.

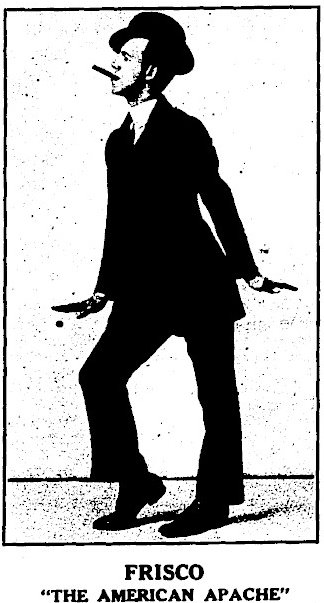
Frisco, The American Apache

Joe Frisco died of cancer at the age of 68 on February 18, 1958, at the Motion Picture Country House and Hospital in Woodland Hills, Los Angeles, California.

== Filmography ==
Year	Title	Role	Notes
1930	The Benefit	Himself	Short
1930	The Song Plugger	Himself	Short
1930	The Happy Hottentots	Joe / Reese Brother	Short
1930	The Gorilla	Garrity	
1930	The Border Patrol	Himself	Short
1933	Mr. Broadway	Himself	
1938	Western Jamboree	Himself	
1940	Ride, Tenderfoot, Ride	Haberdasher	
1944	Atlantic City	Himself	
1945	Shady Lady	Tramp	
1947	That's My Man	Willie Wagonstatter	
1950	Riding High	Himself	
1957	Sweet Smell of Success	Herbie Temple	(final film role)

== In popular culture ==
- Frisco was so well known for his jazz dance that writer F. Scott Fitzgerald makes reference to him in his 1925 novel The Great Gatsby when he describes how an actress at one of Gatsby's parties starts the revelry: "Suddenly one of the gypsies, in trembling opal, seizes a cocktail out of the air, dumps it down for courage and, moving her hands like Frisco, dances out alone on the canvas platform." The Great Gatsby, chapter 3.
- The Marx Brothers referred to Frisco in an early version of their "Theatrical Agency" sketch in On the Balcony. The Frisco reference was replaced by Maurice Chevalier when they filmed the sequence in Monkey Business.

== See also ==
- List of dancers
