= Strait Playin' =

Single by Shaquille O'Neal featuring DJ Quik and Peter Gunz

from the album You Can't Stop the Reign and Steel (soundtrack)
- B-side: "No Love Lost"
- Released: January 18, 1997
- Recorded: 1996
- Studio: Skip Saylor (Los Angeles, California)
- Genre: Hip hop
- Length: 4:35
- Label: Interscope
- Songwriter: Shaquille O'Neal
- Producer: DJ Quik

Shaquille O'Neal singles chronology
"You Can't Stop the Reign" (1996)	"Strait Playin'" (1997)	"Men of Steel" (1997)

Music video
- "Strait Playin'" on YouTube

"Strait Playin'" is the second single released from Shaquille O'Neal's third album, You Can't Stop the Reign. It was produced by DJ Quik and featured verses from Quik and Peter Gunz. The song was a slight improvement from the album's first single, peaking at number 33 on the Hot R&B/Hip-Hop Singles & Tracks. The song was also featured on the soundtrack to the film Steel starring O'Neal himself.

== Track listing ==
=== A-Side ===
1. "Strait Playin'" (Superman Extended Mix)- 6:05
2. "Strait Playin'" (Superman Extended Instrumental)- 5:30

=== B-Side ===
1. "No Love Lost" (LP Version)- 3:51
2. "No Love Lost" (King Tech Remix)- 4:27
3. "No Love Lost" (Acapella)- 3:46
