= No Hook =

Single by Shaquille O'Neal featuring RZA and Method Man

from the album Shaq Fu: Da Return
- Released: February 6, 1995
- Recorded: 1994
- Genre: Horrorcore
- Length: 3:17
- Label: Jive
- Songwriters: Shaquille O'Neal; Robert Diggs; Clifford Smith
- Producer: RZA

Shaquille O'Neal singles chronology
"Biological Didn't Bother" (1994)	"No Hook" (1995)	"You Can't Stop the Reign" (1996)

Music video
- "No Hook" on YouTube

"No Hook" is a hardcore hip hop song written and performed by American rappers Shaquille O'Neal, RZA and Method Man. It was released on February 6, 1995 via Jive Records as the second single off of Shaq's second studio album Shaq Fu: Da Return. Production was handled by RZA.

The song peaked at number 66 on the Hot R&B/Hip-Hop Songs and number 16 on the Hot Rap Songs in the United States.

An accompanying music video was directed by Lionel C. Martin.

== Track listing ==
12" vinyl
No.	Title	Producer(s)	Length
1.	"No Hook" (Radio Version)	RZA
2.	"No Hook" (Niles Flip DaScrip Mix)	RZA
3.	"No Hook" (Waterbed Remix)	RZA
4.	"No Hook" (RZA's Remix)	RZA
5.	"No Hook" (Niles Radio Remix)	RZA
6.	"(So U Wanna Be) Hardcore"	Chyskillz

== Charts ==
Chart (1995)	Peak position
US Bubbling Under Hot 100 (Billboard)	3
US Hot R&B/Hip-Hop Songs (Billboard)	66
US Hot Rap Songs (Billboard)	16
