= Men of Steel (song) =

Single by Shaquille O'Neal, Ice Cube, B-Real, Peter Gunz and KRS-One

from the album Music From and Inspired by the Motion Picture Steel
- Released: August 26, 1997
- Recorded: 1997
- Genre: Hip hop
- Length: 4:35
- Label: Qwest Records
- Songwriters: Shaquille O'Neal; O'Shea Jackson; Louis Freese; Peter Pankey; Lawrence Parker; Jean-Claude Olivier; Samuel Barnes
- Producers: Ken Ross (exec.); Poke and Tone

Shaquille O'Neal singles chronology
| "Strait Playin'" (1997) | "Men of Steel" (1997) | "The Way It's Goin' Down" (1998) |

Ice Cube singles chronology
| "The World Is Mine" (1997) | "Men of Steel" (1997) | "Only in California" (1997) |

B-Real singles chronology
| "Hit 'Em High (The Monstars' Anthem)" (1997) | "Men of Steel" (1997) | ""Dr. Greenthumb" (with Cypress Hill)" (1998) |

KRS-One singles chronology
| "A Friend" (1997) | "Men of Steel" (1997) | "Digital" (1998) |

Music video
- "Men of Steel" on YouTube

"Men of Steel" is a song performed by American rappers Shaquille O'Neal, Ice Cube, B-Real, Peter Gunz and KRS-One from the soundtrack to Kenneth Johnson's film Steel. It was released on August 26, 1997 through Qwest Records as the only single issued specifically for the album. Production was handled by Poke and Tone with Ken Ross serving as executive producer.

The single peaked at number 82 on the Billboard Hot 100, number 53 on the Hot R&B/Hip-Hop Songs, number 10 on the Hot Rap Songs in the US.

== Track listing ==
| No. | Title | Length |
|---|---|---|
| 1. | "Men of Steel" (album version) | 4:35 |
| 2. | "Men of Steel" (instrumental) | 4:35 |
| 3. | "Men of Steel" (a cappella) | 4:31 |

== Personnel ==
- Shaquille O'Neal – vocals
- O'Shea Jackson – vocals
- Louis Freese – vocals
- Peter Pankey – vocals
- Lawrence Parker – vocals
- Jean-Claude Olivier – producer
- Samuel Barnes – producer
- Ken Ross – executive producer
- Mark D. Persaud – co-executive producer
- Ian Alexander – associate executive producer
- Jay Brown – associate executive producer
- Gregory Gilmer – artwork

== Charts ==
| Chart (1997) | Peak position |
|---|---|
| US Billboard Hot 100 | 82 |
| US Hot R&B/Hip-Hop Songs (Billboard) | 53 |
| US Hot Rap Songs (Billboard) | 10 |
