= Chimpanzee war =

Chimpanzee War may refer to:

- Gombe Chimpanzee War (1974–1978)
- Ngogo Chimpanzee War (2015–present)
