= The Gorilla (1930 film) =

1930 film

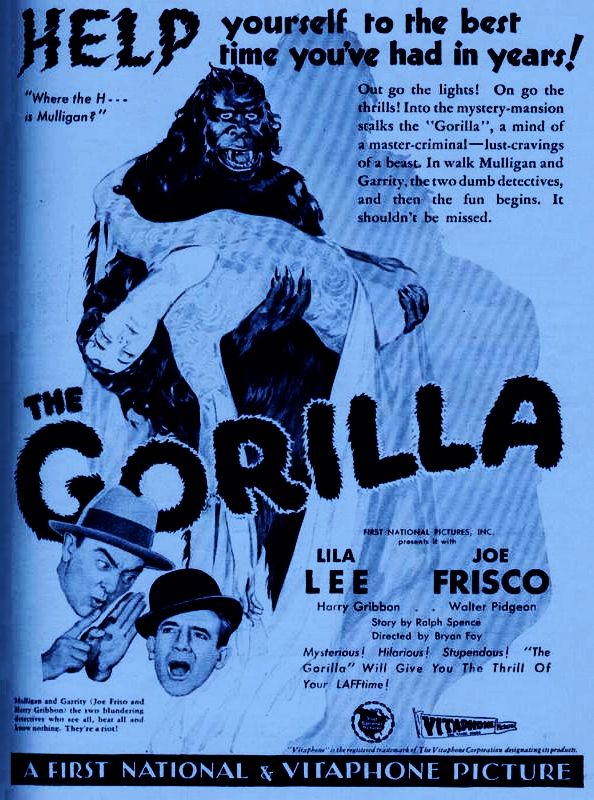
- theatrical release poster
- Directed by: Bryan Foy
- Written by: Adaptation: Herman Ruby; B. Harrison Orkow
- Based on: The Gorilla; 1925 play by Ralph Spence
- Starring: Joe Frisco; Harry Gribbon; Walter Pidgeon; Lila Lee
- Cinematography: Sidney Hickox
- Edited by: George Amy
- Production company: First National Pictures
- Distributed by: Warner Bros. Pictures
- Release date: November 2, 1930 (US); (limited release)
- Running time: 70 minutes
- Country: United States
- Language: English

The Gorilla is a 1930 American pre-Code mystery-comedy film produced by First National Pictures, distributed by Warner Bros. Pictures, and directed by Bryan Foy. It stars Joe Frisco, Harry Gribbon, Walter Pidgeon and Lila Lee, and is based on the 1925 play of the same name by Ralph Spence. The 1930 film version was a sound remake of the 1927 silent version, also produced by First National Pictures.

The Gorilla is presumed lost; none of its visual elements are known to survive. The soundtrack, which was recorded on Vitaphone disks, may survive in private hands.

In the film, a man is warned by a threatening letter that a killer gorilla will arrive at his home before midnight. The man hires two detectives to guard him. One of them is persuaded to wear a gorilla suit in hopes of enticing the real gorilla. When the gorilla does arrive, it turns the tables and has the disguised detective hunted down by its enemies.

== Plot ==
A murder is supposedly caused by a gorilla. Police catch only a glimpse of a gorilla's shadow, cast against a brick wall, before it disappears. When Cyrus Stevens receives a note that the gorilla will arrive at his home before midnight, he hires detectives Garrity and Mulligan to help protect him.

Stevens lives with his ward, Alice Denby, who is in love with Arthur Marsden. Garrity and Mulligan stand guard outside the house until close to midnight, but do not see anything suspicious. Mulligan persuades Garrity to don a gorilla suit to entice the gorilla and trap him. To avoid being shot by those searching for the gorilla, Garrity wears a white ribbon around his neck.

While Garrity searches for the gorilla, the real gorilla appears and chases Mulligan, who climbs a tree and calls for help, but no one arrives. The gorilla breaks off a branch of the tree and Mulligan falls to the ground. The gorilla then finds Garrity, who has hidden in another tree. He reaches for Garrity, but simply removes the white ribbon and places it around his own neck. The real gorilla then wanders freely, leaving Garrity, unable to remove his costume's head, hunted as the real gorilla.

Garrity finally removes the head, but is still pursued and shot at in the dark until he reaches a lighted area. Marsden, who turns out to be an undercover detective, discovers that Stevens, in a gorilla suit of his own, is the real murderer.

== Cast ==
- Joe Frisco as Garrity
- Harry Gribbon as Mulligan
- Walter Pidgeon as Arthur Marsden
- Lila Lee as Alice Denby
- Purnell Pratt as The Stranger
- Edwin Maxwell as Cyrus Stevens
- Roscoe Karns as Simmons
- William H. Philbrick as Jeff
- Landers Stevens as Inspector
- Charles Gemora as The Gorilla

== See also ==
- List of lost films
