= I'm Outstanding =

Single by Shaquille O'Neal

from the album Shaq Diesel
- B-side: "Ode to Shaquille"
- Released: November 10, 1993
- Recorded: 1993
- Genre: Hip hop
- Length: 4:07
- Label: Jive
- Songwriters: Shaquille O'Neal; Alisa Yarbrough; Erick Sermon; Raymound Calhoun
- Producer: Erick Sermon

Shaquille O'Neal singles chronology
"(I Know I Got) Skillz" (1993)	"I'm Outstanding" (1993)	"Shoot Pass Slam" (1994)

Music video
- "I'm Outstanding" on YouTube

"I'm Outstanding" is a song by American former professional basketball player Shaquille O'Neal, released in November 1993 by Jive Records as the second single from his debut album, Shaq Diesel (1993). The song was co-written by O'Neal with producer Erick Sermon, Alisa Yarbrough and Raymound Calhoun. The single features several samples and was a minor success, making it to number 47 on the US Billboard Hot 100 and number 70 on the UK Singles Chart. Its accompanying music video was directed by Jim Swaffield and shot in Orlando, Florida.

== Samples ==
"I'm Outstanding" sampled the following songs:

- "Don't Stop the Music" by Yarbrough & Peoples
- "The Payback" by James Brown
- "Outstanding" by The Gap Band
- "Jingling Baby" by LL Cool J

== Critical reception ==
Larry Flick from Billboard magazine commented, "Basketball superstar edges closer to getting much-desired hip-hop credibility with this Erick Sermon-produced kicker, which is fueled by a well-placed sample from 'Outstanding' by the Gap Band. O'Neal's lyrical chops are as puffed up and boastful as any rapper worth his salt. He displays a lot of promise here, and is aided by a radio-friendly hook that could connect with open-minded programmers." Pan-European magazine Music & Media wrote, "The 7 foot 3 master of disaster of the basketball pitch slowly raps his own impressive biography—about the young, gifted and black who made it outside of the gettho."

== Music video ==
The music video for "I'm Outstanding" was directed by American director Jim Swaffield and shot in Orlando, Florida. Roger Tonry directed photography, and J. Nardelli, Chris Wagoner and Keith Milton produced.

== Single track listing ==
=== A-side ===
1. "I'm Outstanding" (LP version) – 4:07
2. "I'm Outstanding" (Funk Lord remix) – 3:55

=== B-side ===
1. "I'm Outstanding" (808 instrumental) – 4:04
2. "I'm Outstanding" (Funk Lord remix instrumental) – 3:56
3. "Ode to Shaquille" – 2:07

== Charts ==
Chart (1994)	Peak position
UK Singles (OCC)	70
UK Dance (Music Week)	19
UK Club Chart (Music Week)	76
US Billboard Hot 100	47
US R&B/Hip-Hop Songs (Billboard)	29
US Hot Rap Singles (Billboard)	6
US Hot Dance Music/Maxi-Singles Sales (Billboard)	17
