= You Can't Stop the Reign (song) =

Single by Shaquille O'Neal featuring The Notorious B.I.G.

from the album You Can't Stop the Reign
- Released: October 20, 1996
- Recorded: 1996
- Genre: Hip hop
- Length: 4:40
- Label: Interscope
- Songwriters: Shaquille O'Neal; Christopher Wallace; Christopher Jones
- Producer: Chris Large

Shaquille O'Neal singles chronology
"No Hook" (1995)	"You Can't Stop the Reign" (1996)	"Strait Playin'" (1997)

The Notorious B.I.G. singles chronology
"Only You" (1996)	"You Can't Stop the Reign" (1996)	"Hypnotize" (1997)

"You Can't Stop the Reign" is the first single released from Shaquille O'Neal's third album, You Can't Stop the Reign. The song was moderately successful, making it to 54 on the Hot R&B/Hip-Hop Singles & Tracks. Three versions of the song were released, the single version featuring three verses from Shaq, the album version (entitled "Still Can't Stop the Reign), which featured 2 verses from The Notorious B.I.G. and a remix that was made by DJ Quik. The Notorious B.I.G.'s verse would later be posthumously re-used on "Unbreakable", the opening track of Michael Jackson's 2001 album Invincible. The song contains a sample of 1987 hit "You Can't Stop the Rain" by Loose Ends.

The album version was officially released onto streaming platforms as a single on June 14, 2024, with the rest of the album being available two weeks later on June 28.

== Single track listing ==
=== A-Side ===
1. "You Can't Stop the Reign" (Single Version)- 4:40
2. "Still Can't Stop the Reign" (Album Version)- 4:43

=== B-Side ===
1. "You Can't Stop the Reign" (Remix)- 4:38
2. "You Can't Stop the Reign" (Single Instrumental)- 4:38

== Charts ==
Chart (1996–97)	Peak position
UK Dance (Official Charts)	17
UK Hip Hop/R&B (Official Charts)	9
UK Singles (Official Charts)	40
US R&B/Hip-Hop Airplay (Billboard)	54
