= Guerilla (newspaper) =

Canadian underground newspaper

- Type: Underground newspaper
- Editor: Mike Constable
- Founded: 1970
- Ceased publication: 1974
- Political alignment: New Left, counterculture
- Headquarters: Toronto, Ontario, Canada

Guerilla was a Canadian underground newspaper published in Toronto, Ontario, from 1970 until 1974. Associated with the city's New Left and counterculture, it covered radical politics, the anti–Vietnam War movement, gay liberation, the women's liberation movement, communal and alternative lifestyles, local activism and the arts. In 1974, the newspaper was renamed the Toronto Free Press, which continued for several more months.

Historian David S. Churchill described Guerilla as a clearinghouse for New Left politics, hippie culture and local events in Toronto.

Guerilla
- Type: Underground newspaper
- Editor: Mike Constable
- Founded: 1970
- Ceased publication: 1974
- Political alignment: New Left, counterculture
- Headquarters: Toronto, Ontario, Canada

Guerilla was a Canadian underground newspaper published in Toronto, Ontario, from 1970 until 1974. Associated with the city's New Left and counterculture, it covered radical politics, the anti–Vietnam War movement, gay liberation, the women's liberation movement, communal and alternative lifestyles, local activism and the arts. In 1974, the newspaper was renamed the Toronto Free Press, which continued for several more months.

== History ==
Guerilla began publication in Toronto in 1970.

The newspaper's founding collective included Sharon Fronczak, Bill Saunders, Jim Brophy and Robert Macdonald, while artist and political cartoonist Mike Constable served as editor.

American draft resisters and deserters who had moved to Toronto played a prominent role in the paper. Historian David S. Churchill identifies Jim Brophy, Robert Macdonald, Tom Needham and Jim Christie among the Americans associated with Guerilla, alongside Canadian activists including Maureen Jackman and Sharon Fronczak.

The newspaper initially operated from an office on Dundas Street West and later from 201 Queen Street East.

The newspaper was produced collectively. Disagreements arose among its contributors over the balance between political reporting and countercultural subjects.

In 1974, Guerilla was renamed the Toronto Free Press, which ceased publication a few months later.

== Content and politics ==
Guerilla combined political reporting and commentary with coverage of Toronto's alternative culture. It reported on the Vietnam War, American campus unrest, the Black Panther Party, anti-war organizing and other radical movements in Canada and the United States.

The paper covered and supported local activist causes, including opposition to the proposed Spadina Expressway. It also reported on community health clinics, food co-operatives and other alternative social institutions.

The newspaper carried regular material concerning Rochdale College, Toronto's experimental free university and countercultural residence. Dr. David Collins of the Toronto Free Youth Clinic contributed medical advice, while economist and Canadian nationalist Mel Watkins contributed book reviews.

Guerilla also reprinted material from American underground publications, including Ramparts and the Berkeley Barb.

== Gay liberation ==
Guerilla covered the emerging gay liberation movement in Toronto before the establishment of The Body Politic in 1971. It published news, announcements and commentary concerning gay and lesbian organizing.

The newspaper published material associated with early Toronto gay-liberation groups and, during the summer of 1971, serialized Carl Wittman's A Gay Manifesto.

Gay activists sometimes criticized the newspaper's treatment of gay-liberation issues. Guerilla nevertheless continued to publish material concerning the movement.

== Women's movement ==
In February 1972, a meeting of women interested in establishing a feminist newspaper was held at the Guerilla office.

The discussions contributed to the creation of The Other Woman, whose first issue appeared in May–June 1972.

== Archives ==
Issues of Guerilla are held by the Toronto Reference Library. A selection of issues has also been digitized by the Connexions Archive.

== See also ==
- Underground press
- Counterculture of the 1960s
- Vietnam War resisters in Canada
- The Body Politic
- Rochdale College

== Content and politics ==
Guerilla combined political reporting and commentary with coverage of Toronto's alternative culture. It reported on the Vietnam War, American campus unrest, the Black Panther Party, anti-war organizing and other radical movements in Canada and the United States.

At the local level, the paper covered and supported a variety of activist causes, including opposition to the proposed Spadina Expressway. It also reported on community health clinics, food co-operatives and other alternative social institutions.

The newspaper carried regular material concerning Rochdale College, Toronto's experimental free university and countercultural residence. Dr. David Collins of the Toronto Free Youth Clinic contributed medical advice, while economist and Canadian nationalist Mel Watkins contributed book reviews.

Guerilla also reprinted material from American underground publications including Ramparts and the Berkeley Barb, reflecting connections between Toronto's counterculture and similar movements in the United States.

== Gay liberation ==
Guerilla was among the Toronto alternative publications that provided sustained coverage of the emerging gay liberation movement before the establishment of The Body Politic in 1971. It published news, announcements and commentary concerning gay and lesbian organizing.

The newspaper published material associated with early Toronto gay-liberation groups and, during the summer of 1971, serialized Carl Wittman's A Gay Manifesto.

Its relationship with gay activists was sometimes contentious, and activists at times criticized the newspaper's treatment of gay-liberation issues. Nevertheless, Guerilla provided an important publishing outlet for gay-liberation material at a time when such subjects received little sympathetic treatment in Toronto's mainstream press.

== Women's movement ==
Guerilla was also connected with Toronto's emerging women's liberation movement. In February 1972, a meeting of women interested in establishing a feminist newspaper was held at the Guerilla office.

The discussions contributed to the creation of The Other Woman, whose first issue appeared in May–June 1972.

== Legacy and archives ==
Guerilla formed part of the broader network of underground and alternative publications that flourished in Toronto during the late 1960s and early 1970s. Its pages documented the interaction of anti-war activists, American expatriates, feminists, gay-liberation activists, student radicals and other movements active in the city during the period.

Issues of Guerilla are held by the Toronto Reference Library. A substantial selection of issues has also been digitized by the Connexions Archive.

== See also ==
- Underground press
- Counterculture of the 1960s
- Vietnam War resisters in Canada
- The Body Politic
- Rochdale College
