= You Can't Stop the Reign =

Studio album by Shaquille O'Neal
- Released: November 19, 1996
- Recorded: 1996
- Studio: T.W.IsM. Studios (Orlando, Florida); Skip Saylor Studios (Los Angeles, California); Bosstown Recording Studios (Atlanta, Georgia)
- Genre: Hip-hop
- Length: 68:38
- Label: T.W.IsM.; Interscope
- Producer: Bobby Brown; Chris Large; Dave Atkinson; Darkchild; DJ Quik; Domingo; Easy Mo Bee; G-1; I-Roc; Jammin' James Carter; Mobb Deep; Poke & Tone; Ralph Tresvant; Ross "Spyda" Sloan

Shaquille O'Neal chronology
Shaq Fu: Da Return (1994)	You Can't Stop the Reign (1996)	Respect (1998)

Singles from You Can't Stop the Reign
- 1. "You Can't Stop the Reign" Released: October 20, 1996; 2. "Strait Playin'" Released: January 18, 1997

Professional ratings
Review scores
Source	Rating
AllMusic	2.5/5 stars
Entertainment Weekly	B−
Muzik	2.5/5 stars

You Can't Stop the Reign is the third studio album by American basketball player and rapper Shaquille O'Neal. It was released on November 19, 1996, through T.W.IsM./Interscope Records. Recording sessions took place at T.W.IsM. Studios in Orlando, Skip Saylor in Los Angeles and Bosstown Recording Studios in Atlanta, with additional recordings done at Soundtrack Studios and The Hit Factory in New York. Production was handled by Dave Atkinson, Ross "Spyda" Sloan, Domingo, Trackmasters, Darkchild, Bobby Brown, Chris Large, DJ Quik, Easy Mo Bee, G-1, I-Roc, Jammin' James Carter, Mobb Deep and Ralph Tresvant. It features guest appearances from The Notorious B.I.G., Nas, Lord Tariq and Peter Gunz, S.H.E., Bobby Brown, Jay-Z, Mobb Deep and Peaches.

The album was moderately successful, peaking at number 82 on the Billboard 200 and number 21 on the Top R&B/Hip-Hop Albums in the United States. It was supported by two singles with accompanying music videos for "You Can't Stop the Reign" and "Strait Playin'".

Its lead single, "You Can't Stop the Reign", made it to No. 54 on the Billboard R&B/Hip-Hop Airplay in the United States, No. 40 on the UK singles chart, No. 17 on the Official Dance Singles Chart and No. 9 on the Official Hip Hop and R&B Singles Chart in the United Kingdom and No. 47 in New Zealand. The song has multiple versions, including one that features a verse from The Notorious B.I.G., which was re-used in 2001 for Michael Jackson's song "Unbreakable" from his Invincible album. The "Still Can't Stop the Reign" version peaked at No. 36 on the US Billboard Mainstream R&B/Hip-Hop Airplay chart.

The second single from the album, "Strait Playin'", reached No. 72 on the Radio Songs, No. 33 on the R&B/Hip-Hop Airplay, No. 32 on the Mainstream R&B/Hip-Hop Airplay and No. 40 on the Rhythmic Airplay in the US, and No. 17 in New Zealand. Its "Superman Remix" version was included in 1997 Music From and Inspired By the Motion Picture Steel soundtrack album.

On June 28, 2024, the album was officially re-released onto streaming platforms, now featuring the original unreleased version of "No Love Lost", which included a verse from Nas.

== Track listing ==
No.	Title	Writer(s)	Producer(s)	Length
1.	"Shaquille (Interlude)"	Shaquille O'Neal		0:58
2.	"Still Can't Stop the Reign" (featuring The Notorious B.I.G.)	O'Neal; Christopher Wallace; Craig Williams; Chris Jones; Carl McIntosh; Jane Eugene; Steve Nichols	Chris "Large" Jones; Ross "Spyda" Sloan (add.); Dave Atkinson (add.)	4:43
3.	"D.I.V.A. Radio (Interlude)" (performed by Peaches)			0:55
4.	"It Was All a Dream"	O'Neal; Peter Pankey; Sean Hamilton; Dave Atkinson; Ross Sloan	Dave Atkinson; Ross "Spyda" Sloan	4:43
5.	"No Love Lost" (featuring Jay-Z and Lord Tariq)	O'Neal; Shawn Carter; Hamilton; Jean-Claude Olivier; Samuel Barnes	Poke & Tone	3:51
6.	"Strait Playin'"	O'Neal; Pankey; David Blake; George Archie	DJ Quik; G-One	4:35
7.	"Best to Worst" (featuring Peter Gunz)	O'Neal; Pankey; Hamilton; Domingo Padilla	Domingo	3:58
8.	"Legal Money" (featuring Mobb Deep)	O'Neal; Kejuan Muchita; Albert Johnson; Hamilton; Thom Bell; Linda Creed	Mobb Deep	4:36
9.	"Edge of Night" (featuring Bobby Brown)	O'Neal; Pankey; Hamilton; Williams; Padilla	Domingo; Dave Atkinson (add.); Ross "Spyda" Sloan (add.)	4:26
10.	"S.H.E. (Interlude)" (performed by S.H.E.)	Jania Foxworth; Tyren Perry; Jaimee Foxworth		0:30
11.	"Let's Wait a While" (featuring Jania)	O'Neal; Williams; Olivier; S. Barnes; James Harris III; Terry Lewis	Poke & Tone	4:04
12.	"Can I Play" (featuring Peter Gunz)	O'Neal; Pankey; Hamilton; Rodney Jerkins	Darkchild	4:24
13.	"Just Be Good to Me"	O'Neal; Pankey; Hamilton; Atkinson; Sloan; Harris III; Lewis	Dave Atkinson; Ross "Spyda" Sloan	4:32
14.	"More to Life"	Bobby Brown; Ralph Tresvant; Kenneth Finnel; Darryl Barnes; Pankey; Thomas Reyes	Bobby Brown; Ralph Tresvant; Ken Finnel (co.)	4:24
15.	"Big Dog Stomp"	O'Neal; Todd Gaither; James Carter; Sherwin Charles	Jammin' James Carter; I-Roc; Pat & Jimbob (add.)	4:11
16.	"Game of Death"	O'Neal; William Griffin; Pankey; Hamilton; Osten S. Harvey	Easy Mo Bee	4:12
17.	"Outtro (Interlude)" (performed by Lord Tariq)	Hamilton		1:20
18.	"Player (Bonus Track)" (performed by S.H.E.)	Bernadette Cosgrove; Kevin Bruce Clark; Antonina Armato	Antonina Armato	4:15
19.	"Don't Wanna Be Alone (Bonus Track)" (performed by 1 Accord)	Japhe Tejeda; Charles Paul; Jerkins	Darkchild	4:01
Total length:				1:08:38

2024 streaming release
No.	Title	Writer(s)	Producer(s)	Length
5.	"No Love Lost" (featuring Jay-Z, Nas and Lord Tariq)	O'Neal; Shawn Carter; Nasir Jones; Hamilton; Jean-Claude Olivier; Samuel Barnes	Poke & Tone	4:55

Sample credits

- Track 1 contains elements of "Superman Theme" by John Williams.
- Track 2 contains elements of "You Can't Stop the Rain" by Loose Ends.
- Track 4 contains elements of "Don't Do Me This Way" by Alicia Myers.
- Track 8 contains elements of "Stop, Look, Listen (To Your Heart)" by Diana Ross and Marvin Gaye.
- Track 9 contains elements of "In the Air Tonight" by Phil Collins.
- Track 11 contains elements of "Let's Wait Awhile" by Janet Jackson.
- Track 13 contains elements of "Just Be Good to Me" by The S.O.S. Band.

Notes

- Track 2 features uncredited rap vocals by Notorious B.I.G.
- Track 14 features uncredited rap vocals by Smooth B.
- Track 16 features uncredited rap vocals by Rakim.

== Personnel ==
- Shaquille O'Neal – vocals (tracks: 1, 2, 4–9, 11–16), executive producer
- Jane Eugene – background vocals (track 2)
- Nanci Fletcher – background vocals (track 2)
- Peaches – vocals (track 3)
- Peter "Peter Gunz" Pankey – vocals (track 12), background vocals (tracks: 4, 6, 7)
- Sherry Watson – additional background vocals (track 4)
- Shawn "Jay-Z" Carter – vocals (track 5)
- Sean "Lord Tariq" Hamilton – vocals (tracks: 5, 17), background vocals (track 8)
- Enrico Consilus Gates – background vocals (track 5), A&R
- David "DJ Quik" Blake – background vocals & producer (track 6)
- Kejuan "Havoc" Muchita – vocals & producer (track 8)
- Albert "Prodigy" Johnson – vocals & producer (track 8)
- Bobby Brown – vocals (track 9), background vocals & producer (track 14)
- Jania Foxworth – vocals (track 10), background vocals (track 11)
- Tyren Perry – vocals (track 10), background vocals (track 11)
- Jaimee Foxworth – vocals (track 10), background vocals (track 11)
- Alicia "Blue" Renee – lead vocals (track 13), background vocals (tracks: 12, 13)
- Ralph Tresvant – background vocals & producer (track 14)
- Dave Atkinson – keyboard programming (track 2), keyboards (tracks: 4, 9), producer (tracks: 4, 13), additional producer (tracks: 2, 9), additional mixing (tracks: 8, 14)
- Ross "Spyda" Sloan – drum programming (track 4), producer (tracks: 4, 13), additional producer (tracks: 2, 9), additional mixing (track 14)
- Jean-Claude "Poke" Olivier – keyboards (track 5), keyboard programming (track 11), producer (tracks: 5, 11)
- Samuel "Tone" Barnes – drum programming (track 5), producer (tracks: 5, 11)
- Kenneth Crouch – additional keyboards (track 6)
- Domingo Padilla – drum programming (track 7), producer (track 7, 9)
- Sherwin "I-Roc" Charles – additional keyboards & producer (track 15)
- Osten S. "Easy Mo Bee" Harvey Jr. – keyboards, drum programming & producer (track 16)
- Chris "Large" Jones – producer (track 2)
- George "G-One" Archie – producer (track 6)
- Rodney "Darkchild" Jerkins – producer (track 12)
- "Jammin'" James Carter – producer (track 15)
- Ken Finnel – co-producer & engineering (track 14)
- Pat & Jimbob – additional producers (track 15)
- Fred McGuinn – engineering (tracks: 2, 4, 5, 9, 12, 13, 15, 16), mixing assistant (track 2)
- Gary Platt – mixing (tracks: 2, 4), engineering (track 13)
- Dexter Simmons – mixing (tracks: 3, 8, 9, 12, 13, 15)
- Bill Esses – mixing (tracks: 5, 11)
- Chris Puram – engineering & mixing (track 6), editing, sequencing
- Tony Smalios – mixing (track 7)
- Mario Rodriguez – mixing (track 8)
- Eric Lynch – engineering & mixing (track 16)
- Robert Vosgien – mastering
- Frank Edwards – editing, sequencing, executive producer, A&R
- Leonard Armato – executive producer
- Hasan Pore – associate producer, A&R
- Kevin Mitchell – associate producer, A&R
- Paul Palmer – A&R
- Rob Kahane – A&R
- Sharon Ronen – album coordinator
- Cindy Cooper – album coordinator

== Charts ==
Chart (1996)	Peak position
US Billboard 200	82
US Top R&B/Hip-Hop Albums (Billboard)	21
