= The Gorilla (play) =

1925 three-act play written by Ralph Spence

The Gorilla is a three-act play written by Ralph Spence. Donald Gallaher produced it on Broadway, where it opened at the Selwyn Theatre on April 28, 1925. The play was a success and ran on Broadway for 257 performances. A production opened in London at the New Oxford Theatre on June 30, 1925, and ran for 134 performances. The play was a parody of popular theatrical mysteries such as The Bat and The Cat and the Canary. Its advertisements claimed it "outbats The Bat".

== Plot ==
Alice Denby visits her uncle, Cyrus Stevens, at his old, dark mansion on Long Island. She brings along Arthur Madsen, who has written a mystery play about a criminal called "the Gorilla". Alice asks her uncle to consider investing in the play. As he begins to read it, elements from Arthur's play begin to appear in the house. Detectives arrive looking for the Gorilla. The lights go out suddenly at midnight. A gorilla (an ape, not the criminal) escapes from captivity and carries Alice away. In a twist ending, the strange happenings on stage are revealed to be the imagined events of Arthur's play within the play.

== Adaptations ==
The Gorilla was adapted as a silent film of the same name in 1927 and was filmed again in 1930 and 1939, the latter as a vehicle for The Ritz Brothers. The play also served as source material for the 1937 Warner Bros. comedy Sh! The Octopus, starring Hugh Herbert and Allen Jenkins, with the gorilla converted to an octopus.

== See also ==
- The Murders in the Rue Morgue by Edgar Allan Poe
