= The Gorilla (1927 film) =

1927 film by Alfred Santell

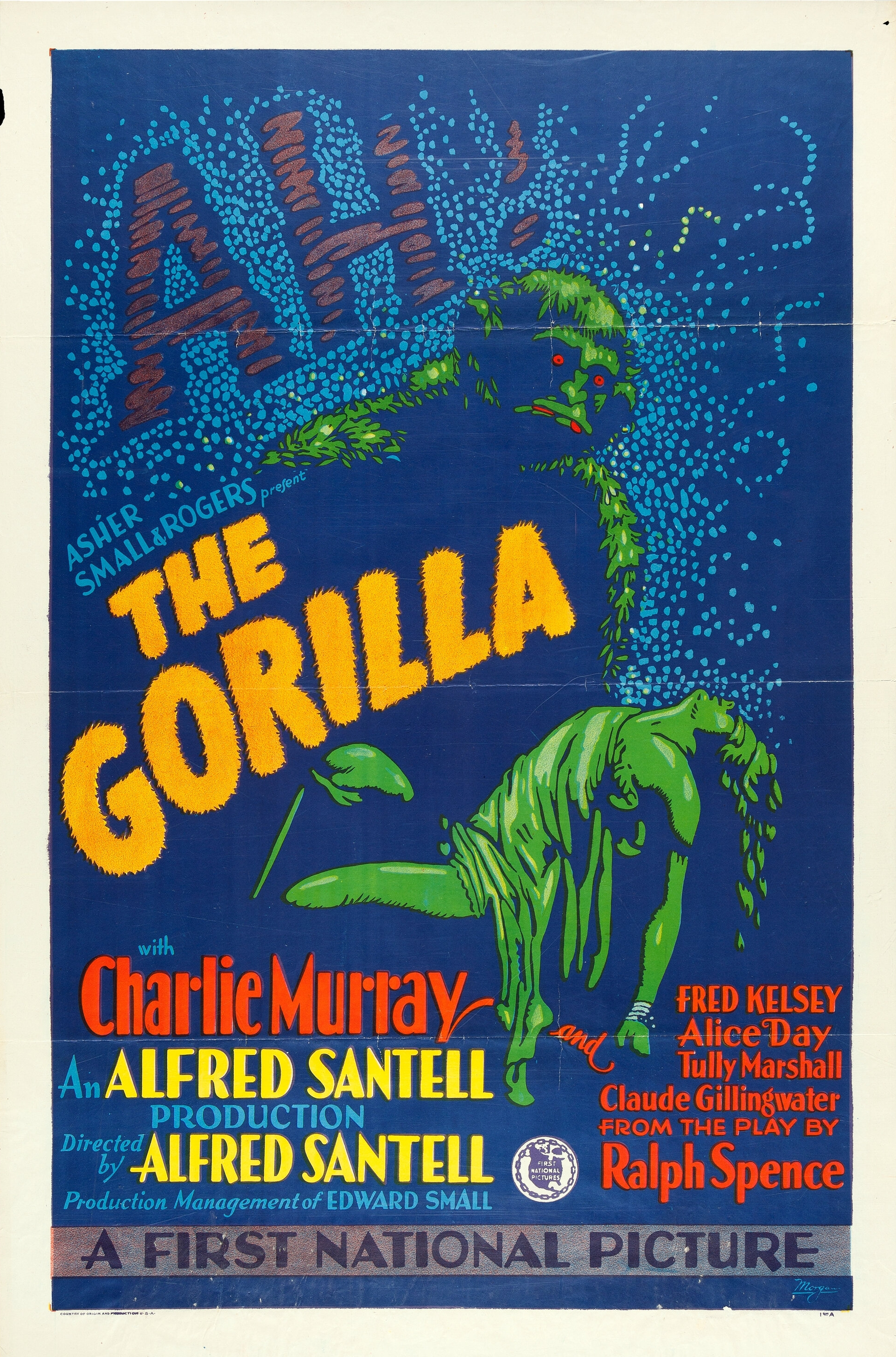
- Directed by: Alfred Santell
- Screenplay by: Al Cohn; Henry McCarty
- Based on: The Gorilla; 1925 play by Ralph Spence
- Produced by: Asher-Small-Rogers
- Starring: Charles Murray; Fred Kelsey; Walter Pidgeon; Alice Day
- Cinematography: Arthur Edeson
- Production company: First National Pictures, Inc.
- Distributed by: First National Pictures, Inc.
- Release date: 5 November 1927
- Running time: 72 minutes
- Country: United States
- Language: Silent (English intertitles)

The Gorilla is a 1927 American silent mystery film directed by Alfred Santell based on the play The Gorilla by Ralph Spence. It stars Charles Murray, Fred Kelsey, and Walter Pidgeon.

Following the success of Spence's play on Broadway, production on a film adaptation was set to start in March 1927, while principal photography only began in August 1927. The Gorilla premiered in Cleveland and Toledo, Ohio and in St. Louis, Missouri on November 5, 1927. The film received positive reviews from The Chicago Tribune, Variety, and Harrison's Reports while being dismissed by The New York Times.

The play was adapted again as a talkie in 1930 and later with the Ritz Brothers in 1939. Prior to its 2024 restoration and reissue, the 1927 version of the film was considered a lost film.

== Plot ==
As the film was considered a lost film for so long, specific details on the plot are not clear. This plot summary combines details from the Library of Congress, the AFI Catalog of Feature Films, and the Harrison's Reports. Some plot details remain unclear, such as whether the murders are done by a real gorilla or a man in the suit in the story.

Mystery surrounds the brutal murder of several persons, with the killer believed to be a gorilla who has murdered Cyrus Townsend, father of Alice, in his home leading to suspicions being put on Arthur Marsden, his secretary and his partner Alice. The circumstances of the murder are similar to the other gorilla killings. As Alice, Marsden and a friend of Townsend with Stevens gather about the library tablem they discover a note that warns them to leave before midnight. At ten minutes to twelve they are terrified by a loud knocking at the door. It turns out to be Garrity and Mulligan, who announce they are detectives sent to solve the mystery.

They begin to search for the killer, whom they are certain is one of the people present. People suddenly vanish, doors open and shut, strange noises are heard and lights go off and on. Meanwhile, a real gorilla is discovered on the premises.

A sailor confesses to being the Gorilla, but Marsden, who reveals himself to be a detective, finds that Stevens is the true culprit.

== Cast ==
- Charles Murray as Garrity
- Fred Kelsey as Mulligan
- Walter Pidgeon as Stevens
- Alice Day as Alice Townsend
- Brooks Benedict as Reporter
- Syd Crossley as Butler
- Claude Gillingwater as Cyrus Townsend
- Tully Marshall as William Townsend
- Gaston Glass as Marsden
- John Gough as Sailor
- Aggie Herring as Cook

== Production ==
=== Background ===
The Gorilla based on the play of the play The Gorilla, a Mystery Comedy in Three Acts by Ralph Spence. Spencer was previously done work in Broadway for The Ziegfeld Follies and made a bet with other playwrights over dinner that he could write a play in just three days. Producer Al H. Woods overheard this and took him on his bet, leading to Spence writing the play The Gorilla which debuted on Broadway on April 28, 1925.

The Gorilla was a humorous variation on Broadway plays like The Bat and The Cat and the Canary. It stayed on Broadway for 257 performances while other productions were also productions performed in London, Boston and Chicago. On January 3, 1927, Film Daily announced an adaptation of the play as a film titled The Gorilla as a forthcoming feature from the independent production company Asher-Small-Rogers. Asher-Small-Rogers would produce the film for First National Pictures, Inc., as the second of their three-picture deal with the company, that started with the film McFadden's Flats.

=== Production ===
Initially, Paul Schofield had been hired to write an adaption but he did not remain with the project. The play was adapted by James T. O'Donohoe with a scenario written by Al Cohn and Henry McCarty. The film eliminates the play-within-a-play gimmick and turns the black servant Jefferson into a disdainful British butler portrayed by Syd Crossley.

Alfred Santell was announced as the film's director on February 25, 1927 with production scheduled to star in March 1927. Production on the film would then later announced to on May 27, 1927 by Motion Picture News that June 1927 was the star of filming and announced the co-leads being Charles Murray and George Sidney. Alice Day received her role that had originally been announced for Dorothy Revier. Some of First National's publicity reports still note Revier being on set in error.

Later, Film Daily again declared that principal photography would be on August 1, 1927, while Variety reported that filming began on August 9, 1927.

The ape suit in the film was created by Charles Gemora, it was his first gorilla creation he made which led to a long Hollywood career involving ape suits. Originally, producer Edward Small thought of using a real Gorilla and contracted the person who captured and trained one for the Ringing Brother Circus.

== Release ==
The Gorilla premiered in Cleveland and Toledo, Ohio and in St. Louis, Missouri on November 5, 1927. It later opened in Los Angeles on November 17, 1927 and in New York on November 21, 1927.

The film was remade as a sound film by First National in 1930 as The Gorilla (1930) with only Walter Pidgeon re-appearing in the film as a different character. The 1930 one is reportedly more close to the play than the original story. The story was adapted again by 20th Century Fox in 1939 again as The Gorilla by Allan Dwan and starring The Ritz Brothers . In the 1940s, there were discussions of a fourth version of the film, but nothing came of the project.

The original 1927 version of the film was long considered a lost film.

The film has been found and was shown at the 2024 San Francisco Silent Film Festival.

== Reception ==
From contemporary reviews, the authors of American Silent Horror, Science Fiction and Fantasy Feature Films, 1913-1929 noted that "most critics felt The Gorilla, in addition to delivering a few scares, largely captured the zaniness of the play." The Chicago Tribune stated that the film had splendid acting and direction. The Harrison's Reports reviewer noted that scenes involving the gorilla on the roof would "take one breath away" while "the scenes that show the heroine coming face to face with the gorilla and swooning, being taken by the gorilla in her arms, are other scenes that will stop one's breath completely." Variety commented "Except in a few serious instances, the story is done in broad comedy. Sets are highly atmospheric. Effective direction by Santell." The New York Times opined "Excitement and amusement are linked in [the film] [...] but here are there, this film slumps into horseplay and silly stunts. Very much as if Mack Sennett had turned to Edgar Allan Poe's Murders in the Rue Morgue and decided to adapt it to the screen."

Some reviewers, such as the Los Angeles Times noted the film's basic premise of an old man killed in a house full of his prospective heirs was not unlike that of The Cat and the Canary, with the newspapers specifically noting that the film was stylistically similar as well, declaring tha "there are some seemingly similar tricks of having the shadows over the building, the play of lights in the windows and odd camera angles."
