= Shaq Fu: Da Return =

Studio album by Shaquille O'Neal
- Released: November 8, 1994
- Recorded: 1994
- Genre: Hip hop
- Length: 43:04
- Label: Jive
- Producers: Chyskillz; Erick Sermon; LoRider; Redman; RZA; The LG Experience; Warren G

Shaquille O'Neal chronology
Shaq Diesel (1993)	Shaq Fu: Da Return (1994)	You Can't Stop the Reign (1996)

Singles from Shaq Fu: Da Return
- 1. "Biological Didn't Bother" Released: October 17, 1994; 2. "No Hook" Released: February 6, 1995

Shaq Fu: Da Return is the second studio album by American basketball player and rapper Shaquille O'Neal. It was released on November 8, 1994, via Jive Records. Production was handled by Erick Sermon, LoRider, The LG Experience, Chyskillz, Redman and Warren G. It features guest appearances from Erick Sermon, General Sha, Ill Al Skratch, Keith Murray, Method Man, Mr. Ruffneck, Redman and RZA.

The album peaked at number 67 on the Billboard 200 and number 19 on the Top R&B/Hip-Hop Albums charts in the United States. It was certified gold by the Recording Industry Association of America on January 11, 1995 for selling 500,000 copies in the US alone.

The album was supported with two singles "Biological Didn't Bother" and "No Hook" with accompanying music videos. Its lead single, "Biological Didn't Bother" (which discusses O'Neal's estrangement from his biological father, with whom he would not reconcile until 2016), reached number 78 on the Billboard Hot 100, number 54 on the Hot R&B/Hip-Hop Songs and number 18 on the Hot Rap Songs. The second single off of the album, "No Hook", made it to number 3 on the Bubbling Under Hot 100, number 66 on the Hot R&B/Hip-Hop Songs and number 16 on the Hot Rap Songs.

The kanji 風—meaning 'wind'—is used on the cover, which can be pronounced as 'fu' in Japanese. It has no relation to the fu (夫) in kung fu (功夫), whose name the album's title references.

== Critical reception ==
Professional ratings
Review scores
Source	Rating
AllMusic	2.5/5 stars
Christgau's Consumer Guide: Albums of the '90s	(2-star Honorable Mention)
Entertainment Weekly	C
NME	7/10
Select	2/5 medals

NME reviewer found the album "doesn't have as sense of continuity". David Thigpen of Entertainment Weekly wrote that "Shaquille O’Neal settles for soggy, tired old beats and raps in a monotone so relentlessly laid-back that he sometimes seems to vanish into himself". In his Christgau's Consumer Guide: Albums of the '90s book, Robert Christgau highlighted both of the album's singles, stating "he's got skillz, connectionz, a wicked laugh--and he can rhyme some".

In a retrospective review for AllMusic, JT Griffith called the album "a solid (but not outstanding) rap CD that takes another step forward in that no-man's land between legitimacy and novelty act".

== Track listing ==
No.	Title	Writer(s)	Producer(s)	Length
1.	"No Hook" (featuring RZA and Method Man)	Shaquille O'Neal; Ken Bailey; RZA; Method Man	RZA	3:17
2.	"Newark to C.I." (featuring Keith Murray)	O'Neal; Bailey; Keith Murray; Reggie Noble	Redman	3:57
3.	"Biological Didn't Bother" (G-Funk Version)	O'Neal; Patrick Harvey; Tony Prendatt	Warren G	5:07
4.	"My Dear"	O'Neal; Warren Griffin	Warren G	3:42
5.	"Shaq's Got It Made"	Edward Archer; Howie Tee	Erick Sermon; Redman	3:57
6.	"Mic Check 1-2" (featuring Ill Al Skratch)	O'Neal; Lorenzo Grooms; Harvey; Prendatt; Alphonso Constant	The LG Experience; LoRider	3:47
7.	"My Style, My Stelo" (featuring Erick Sermon and Redman)	O'Neal; Sermon; Noble	Erick Sermon	3:41
8.	"(So U Wanna Be) Hardcore"	O'Neal; Chylow Parker	Chyskillz	3:27
9.	"Nobody"	O'Neal; Sermon	Erick Sermon	3:48
10.	"Freaky Flow" (featuring Mr. Ruffneck and General Sha)	O'Neal; Parker; Davone Williams; Norald Saunders	Chyskillz	3:43
11.	"Biological Didn't Bother" (Original Flow)	O'Neal; Harvey; Prendatt	The LG Experience; LoRider	4:38
Total length:				43:04

Bonus tracks
No.	Title	Producer(s)	Length
12.	"Shaq-Fu: Stand & Deliver"	Def Jef; Meech Wells
13.	"Biological Didn't Bother" (Dr. Ceuss Remix)

Notes

- Track 3 is remixed by Warren G.

Sample credits

- "Newark to C.I." contains a sample of "Fire"; written by Clarence Satchell, Melvin Pierce, Ralph Middlebrook, Marshall Jones, Leroy Bonner, James Williams, and Willaim Beck; performed by the Ohio Players.
- "Biological Didn't Bother" contains a sample of "They Reminisce Over You (T.R.O.Y.)", written by Corey Penn and Peter Phillips, performed by Pete Rock & CL Smooth.
- "Shaq's Got It Made" is an adaptation of "I Got It Made", written by Edward Archer and Howie Tee, and performed by Special Ed.
  - "I Got It Made" contains a sample of "Rat-Tat-Tat-Tat", written by Andre Young and Tracy Lynn Curry, and performed by Dr. Dre.
- "(So I Wanna Be) Hardcore" contains a sample of "Machine Gun Funk", written and performed by The Notorious B.I.G.
- "Nobody" contains samples from:
  - "Nobody Can Be You", written by Steve Arrington and Charles Carter, and performed by Steve Arrington's Hall of Fame.
  - "It Ain't Hard to Tell", written by Nasir Jones and William Mitchell, and performed by Nas.
- "Freaky Flow" contains a sample of "Come Clean", written by Christopher Martin and Kendrick Davis, and performed by Jeru the Damaja.

== Charts ==
Chart (1994)	Peak position
US Billboard 200	67
US Top R&B/Hip-Hop Albums (Billboard)	19

== Certifications ==
Region	Certification	Certified units/sales
United States (RIAA)	Gold	500,000^{^}
^{^} Shipments figures based on certification alone.
