= Ralph Spence (screenwriter) =

American screenwriter (1890–1949)

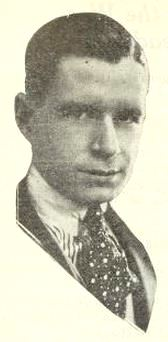
- Spence in 1921
- Born: November 4, 1890; Key West, Florida, U.S.
- Died: December 21, 1949 (aged 59); Woodland Hills, Los Angeles, U.S.
- Years active: 1912–1946

Ralph Spence (November 4, 1890 – November 21, 1949) was an American screenwriter and playwright. Born in Key West, Florida in 1890, he wrote for more than 120 films between 1912 and 1946. His play, The Gorilla, was produced on Broadway in 1925, and was the basis for several films. He also wrote material for a number of presentations of the Ziegfeld Follies and Earl Carroll's Vanities. Spence died in Woodland Hills, Los Angeles from a heart attack.

== Broadway credits ==
Spence worked on several Broadway productions:

- Ziegfeld Follies of 1921 – dialogue
- Ziegfeld Follies of 1922 – book and lyrics
- Ziegfeld Follies of 1923 (summer edition) – sketches
- Earl Carroll's Vanities (1924) – book
- The Gorilla (1925) – playwright
- Earl Carroll's Vanities (1931) – book

== Partial filmography ==
- The Yankee Way (1917)
- On the Jump (1918)
- I'll Say So (1918)
- The Oath (1921)
- Hickville to Broadway (1921)
- After Your Own Heart (1921)
- The Rough Diamond (1921)
- A Ridin' Romeo (1921)
- For Big Stakes (1922)
- Do and Dare (1922)
- Sure Fire Flint (1922)
- Let's Go (1923)
- Six Cylinder Love (1923)
- In Fast Company (1924)
- On Time (1924)
- His Darker Self (1924)
- The Speed Spook (1924)
- Mademoiselle Modiste (1926)
- 3 Bad Men (1926)
- Johnny Get Your Hair Cut (1927)
- Spring Fever (1927)
- The Gorilla (1927)
- Bringing Up Father (1928)
- The Patsy (1928)
- Excess Baggage (1928)
- Cracked Nuts (1931)
- Laugh and Get Rich (1931)
- Her Bodyguard (1933)
- Everybody Dance (1936)
- The Great Barrier (1937)
- King Solomon's Mines (1937)
- Sweet Devil (1938)
- The Gorilla (1939)
- The Flying Deuces (1939)
- Higher and Higher (1943)
