= Gorilla Warfare (album) =

Studio album by Shaquille O'Neal
- Released: August 18, 2023
- Genre: Hip hop; EDM; Dubstep
- Label: Monstercat
- Producer: DIESEL (exec.); Brian Bayati

Shaquille O'Neal chronology
Respect (1998)	Gorilla Warfare (2023)	M.D.E (2025)

Gorilla Warfare is the fifth studio album by American former basketball player and rapper Shaquille O'Neal and the first under the stage name DIESEL, released on August 18, 2023 through Monstercat. A dubstep, house, trap, and hip-hop record, it is O'Neal's first studio album since 1998's Respect released 25 years prior.

== Track listing ==
All tracks are written by Shaquille O'Neal and Brian Bayati.

No.	Title	Producer(s)	Length
1.	"Warfare" (with Celo)	Shaquille O'Neal; Brian Bayati; Marcel Clota	2:36
2.	"Bang Your Head" (with Hairitage)	O'Neal; Bayati; Aaron LeClair	3:24
3.	"No Fear" (with Jessica Audifred)	O'Neal; Bayati; Jessica Audiffred Reina	2:54
4.	"Watch Ur Back" (with VRG and Blackway)	O'Neal; Bayati; Daniel Pacheco; Yaw Sintim-misa	2:25
5.	"Romany Adventures" (with Soltan)	O'Neal; Bayati; Show Lex	3:48
6.	"Heat" (with Crankdat)	O'Neal; Bayati; Christian John Smith	3:15
7.	"Middle Fu" (with Kompany)	O'Neal; Bayati; Kyle Hagberg	3:25
8.	"Kxlla" (with Trxggx)	O'Neal; Bayati; Berge Komorian	2:45
9.	"Warzone" (with Rated R)	O'Neal; Bayati; Frankie Sicoli	3:12
10.	"Hit Em' Like" (with Chassi and Kozmoz)	O'Neal; Bayati; Ilya Pinchassi; Matthias Seyss	3:37
Total length:			31:26
