= Respect (Shaquille O'Neal album) =

Studio album by Shaquille O'Neal
- Released: September 15, 1998
- Recorded: 1997–1998
- Genre: Hip hop
- Length: 63:50
- Labels: T.W.IsM.; A&M
- Producers: DJ Clark Kent; DJ Quik; Duran Ramos; Dutch; Japhe Tejeda; Majah League; Rodney Jerkins; Russell "Russ Prez" Pressley; Sean "Barney" Thomas; The Storm

Shaquille O'Neal chronology
You Can't Stop the Reign (1996)	Respect (1998)	Gorilla Warfare (2023)

Singles from Respect
- 1. "The Way It's Goin' Down" Released: July 3, 1998

Respect is the fourth studio album by American basketball player and rapper Shaquille O'Neal. It was released on September 15, 1998, through T.W.IsM./A&M Records. Production was handled by DJ Clark Kent, DJ Quik, Duran Ramos, Dutch, Japhe Tejeda, Ken Bailey, Majah League, Rodney Jerkins, Russell "Russ Prez" Pressley, Sean "Barney" Thomas and The Storm. It features guest appearances from K-Raw, Peter Gunz, Sonja Blade, 1 Accord, Deadly Venoms, Loon, Public Announcement, Sauce Money and Trigga, as well as O'Neal's Los Angeles Lakers teammate Kobe Bryant performs at the start of the track "3 X's Dope", though his name was not listed on the credits.

It peaked at number 58 on the Billboard 200 and number 8 on the Top R&B/Hip-Hop Albums. As of 2004, the album has sold 104,000 units.

== Critical reception ==
Professional ratings
Review scores
Source	Rating
AllMusic	2.5/5 stars
The Source	3/5 stars
The Village Voice	(dud)

Respect received mixed reviews from music critics. Noah Callahan-Bever of Vibe believed that all tracks on the album "straddle the line between mediocre and unlistenable". Brent Rollins, in his review for The Source, wrote that the album "surely won't have anyone crying for him to give up his day job for a full-time rap career". He highlighted the improvement of Shaquille O'Neal's vocal performance, but added that "at his best [he] doesn't match up well when he's sharing mic time with rap professionals". Stephen Thomas Erlewine of AllMusic thought that Respect is a "well-constructed album that isn't devoid of good moments [...] but it's also not particularly distinctive". Describing it as "background party music", he added that "the musicians who made the record probably had a better time than the listeners at home". Julian Walker of Rap Pages wrote that Shaquille O'Neal "displays the ability to come off hard, without being vulgar or obscene", while also commending his "vast improvement in the delivery, patterns, phrasings, and complexities of his rhymes".

== Track listing ==
No.	Title	Writer(s)	Producer(s)	Length
1.	"Intro"			0:41
2.	"Fiend '98"	Shaquille O'Neal; Todd Gaither; Clark Kent; Eric Barrier; William Griffin	Clark Kent	3:50
3.	"The Way It's Goin' Down (T.W.Is M. for Life)" (featuring Peter Gunz)	O'Neal; Peter Gunz; DJ Quik	DJ Quik	4:29
4.	"Voices" (featuring Sauce Money)	Sting	Dutch	4:21
5.	"Fly Like an Eagle" (featuring Trigga)	Thomas Cassidy; Russell Pressley	Russ Prez	3:59
6.	"The Light of Mine (Interlude)"			0:57
7.	"Go to Let Me Know"	O'Neal; Gaither; Rick Cousin; Jonathan Nettlesbey; Terry Coffey; Howard Hewett	Dutch	4:59
8.	"Rivers (Interlude)" (performed by 1 Accord)	Japhe Tejeda; Jermaine Paul	Rodney Jerkins; Japhe Tejeda	2:38
9.	"Heat It Up" (featuring Loon)	Grace Jones	Clark Kent	4:06
10.	"Pool Jam"	O'Neal; Leonard Bunn; Stevie Wonder	Majah League	4:06
11.	"Make This a Night to Remember" (featuring Peter Gunz and Public Announcement)	O'Neal; Gunz; Duane Ramos; Dana Meyers; Charmaine Sylvers; Nidra Sylvers	Duane "Da Rock" Ramos	3:52
12.	"Blaq Supaman"	O'Neal; Karen Chatman; Sean Thomas; Jimmy Russell; Gregory Hutchinson; Kevin Gulley; Anthony Stewart	Sean "Barney" Thomas	4:49
13.	"Psycho Rap (Interlude)" (performed by Dirt)		Ken Bailey	0:41
14.	"Deeper" (featuring Sonja Blade and K-Raw)	Kent; Sonja Holder	Clark Kent	3:40
15.	"The Bomb Baby" (featuring Deadly Venoms and K-Raw)	Amma Brown; Kimberly Johnson; Sidney Hall; Judy Rann; Norman Bell	Storm	4:57
16.	"3 X's Dope" (featuring Sonja Blade)	O'Neal; Holder; Kent; Chauncey Hawkins	Clark Kent	3:41
17.	"Like What"	O'Neal; Amos Stokes; Leslie Callaway	Majah League	4:24
18.	"48 @ the Buzzer"	O'Neal; Gaither; Kent; Herbie Hancock	Clark Kent	3:40
Total length:				1:03:50

Sample credits

- "Fiend '98" contains samples from:
  - "School Boy Crush"; written by Onnie McIntyre, Alan Gorrie, Roger Ball, Malcolm Duncan, Steve Ferrone, and James Stuart; as recorded by Average White Band.
  - "Microphone Fiend" written by Eric Barrier and William Griffin, as recorded by Eric B. & Rakim.
- "Voices" contains a sample from "Voices Inside My Head", written by Sting, as recorded by The Police.
- "Got to Let Me Know" contains an interpolation of "Show Me", written by Jonathan Nettlesbey, Terry Coffey, and Howard Hewett.
- "Heat It Up" contains a sample from "Feel Up", written and recorded by Grace Jones.
- "Pool Jam" contains a sample from "You Haven't Done Nothin'", written and recorded by Stevie Wonder.
- "Make This a Night to Remember" contains a sample from "A Night to Remember"; written by Dana Meyers, Charmaine Sylvers, and Nidra Sylvers; as recorded by Shalamar.
- "Blaq Supaman" contains a sample from "Black Superman"; written by Jimmy Russell, Gregory Hutchison, Kevin Gulley, and Anthony Stewart; as recorded by Above the Law.
- "48 @ the Buzzer" contains a sample from "Watermelon Man", written and recorded by Herbie Hancock.

== Charts ==
Chart (1998)	Peak position
US Billboard 200	58
US Top R&B/Hip-Hop Albums (Billboard)	8
