= Steel (1997 film) =

Superhero film by Kenneth Johnson

- Theatrical release poster
- Directed by: Kenneth Johnson
- Written by: Kenneth Johnson
- Based on: Steel by: Louise Simonson; Jon Bogdanove
- Produced by: David Salzman; Quincy Jones; Joel Simon
- Starring: Shaquille O'Neal; Annabeth Gish; Richard Roundtree; Judd Nelson
- Cinematography: Mark Irwin
- Edited by: John F. Link
- Music by: Mervyn Warren
- Production companies: Warner Bros. Quincy Jones-David Salzman Entertainment
- Distributed by: Warner Bros.
- Release date: August 15, 1997
- Running time: 97 minutes
- Country: United States
- Language: English
- Budget: $16 million
- Box office: $1.7 million

Steel is a 1997 American superhero film based on the DC Comics character of the same name. The film stars Shaquille O'Neal as John Henry Irons and his alter-ego Steel, Annabeth Gish as his wheelchair-using partner Susan Sparks, and Judd Nelson as their rival Nathaniel Burke.

The plot centers on an accident caused by Burke, which leaves Sparks paralyzed. The accident results in Irons quitting his job. Burke begins mass-producing weapons and selling them to criminals. In order to stop Burke, Irons and Sparks create a suit of armor that leads Irons to become the superhero Steel.

Written and directed by Kenneth Johnson, the film separates itself from the comic book series (and John Henry Irons' status as a supporting character of Superman) by using original protagonists and antagonists.

Upon its initial release on August 15, 1997, Steel was a box-office bomb and received negative reviews from critics, who complained about the film's "cheesiness" and poor acting.

== Plot ==
John Henry Irons is a weapons designer who invents high-tech laser guns, protective armor, and sonic sound cannons for the United States military. One soldier, Nathaniel Burke, decides to show just what Irons' weapons can do and sets one of Irons' sonic cannons at the highest power setting, firing the device at an abandoned building, but the weapon backfires and destroys the building where the team is situated. Irons' partner, Susan "Sparky" Sparks, is crushed by a large slab of concrete in the ensuing chaos. In court, Irons reveals Burke's role in the incident, and Burke is dismissed from the military. Because his weapons resulted in Sparks becoming a paraplegic, Irons resigns in disgust. Meanwhile, Burke hatches a plot to sell Irons' weapons to criminal gangs, recruiting a video arcade manager to help him carry out this deed.

Irons witnesses a bank robbery organized by gang members wielding Burke's modified guns; they escape before he can interrogate them on where they obtained the weapons. The gang does not tell Irons anything when confronted directly in their hideout. Irons visits Sparks in a veteran's hospital and takes her to his own assembled laboratory, where he hopes he and Sparks can create weapons needed to combat the criminals. With the help of Uncle Joe, they forge a suit of armor and the weaponry necessary for Irons to carry out his war on crime and become the vigilante "Steel". During his crusade against crime, Irons is pursued by the cops and is forced to return to his lair. Five nights later, the robbers arranged to rob another bank. Irons, as Steel, tries to stop them, but is hindered by the robbers' weapons. When Irons returns to his grandmother's house, he is arrested.

Meanwhile, Burke prepares to auction off all his modified weapons to every criminal organization in the world over the Internet. When Irons is released from jail, Sparky is captured by Burke's thugs. Irons, as Steel, attempts to infiltrate Burke's headquarters, but is captured himself in the process. When Burke continues with the auction, he is tricked by Steel, which allows him and Sparks to rebel and destroy Burke's lair. Burke himself is killed when a laser he fires towards Steel reflects towards him due to Steel's suit. After this, Steel, Sparky, Joe, and Martin escape Burke's lair.

The following day, Col. David talks to actor Arnold Schwarzenegger (actually Irons via voice changer) about Steel and the events of the day before, and offers him help, before realizing that it is actually Irons who he is talking to; after that, Irons declines David's offer.

In the grand opening of her restaurant, Irons' grandmother tells him about Steel and then tells Joe that everyone would be proud of his heroism. After Sparky shows the new modifications of her wheelchair that allow her to walk, Irons smiles and hugs her.

== Cast ==
- Shaquille O'Neal as John Henry Irons / Steel
- Annabeth Gish as Susan Sparks
- Judd Nelson as Nathaniel Burke
- Richard Roundtree as Uncle Joe
- Irma P. Hall as Grandma Odessa
- Ray J as Martin Irons
- Hill Harper as "Slats"
- Kevin Grevioux as Singer
- Charles Napier as Colonel David
- Kerrie Keane as Senator Nolan
- Thom Barry as Sergeant Marcus
- Rutanya Alda as Mrs. Hunt

== Production ==
Production of the film Steel started with music producer Quincy Jones and his partner David Salzman. Both Jones and Salzman were fans of the Steel character, especially Jones, who found personal reasons to support the project. Jones stated that he found children's "perspective on the future has changed for the worse, and I hate seeing young people who don't believe in the future. Steel—and I don't want to use that word 'superhero' because he doesn't fly or anything like that—represents a role model. Let's just call him a 'super human being'". Wesley Snipes was Kenneth Johnson's first choice for the lead role. Jones and Salzman had initially approached Shaquille O'Neal and his agent Leonard Armato regarding a Hardware adaptation, but the basketballer said he related himself more to Steel. Johnson later admitted that Shaq was a bad choice for the role.

=== Writing ===
Kenneth Johnson was the screenwriter and director of Steel. Johnson was originally uninterested in doing a superhero film, having previously turned down similar projects after the success of his television series The Bionic Woman, Alien Nation, and The Incredible Hulk. Film producer Joel Simon described Steel as being different, stating that he was "a knight in shining armor in a contemporary setting". Johnson removed Steel's cape from his costume to reflect this.

Johnson described Steel's persona as a "blue-collar Batman" and removed Steel from his comic book storyline and replaced it with protagonists and antagonists of his own invention. To aid with the urban aspects of the dialog, Johnson took a copy of the script to South Central Los Angeles and spent a day with a group of kids to ensure that the language of some of the characters was more believable. Throughout the film and script, Johnson created several allusions to his previous television series Alien Nation.

=== Filming ===
The filming schedule consisted of fifty-one days with thirty-two full nights of shooting in downtown Los Angeles. The shooting schedule presented difficulties for the director due to the schedule of the star Shaquille O'Neal. O'Neal was already committed for playing in the 1996 Summer Olympics, and training at the Los Angeles Lakers' camp in Hawaii. This left Johnson with five weeks to complete filming all scenes with O'Neal. O'Neal had one read-through of the script before the Olympics and then worked with acting coach Ben Martin in between games to work on his character. When O'Neal returned to act with the rest of the cast, he had all his lines memorized.

== Music ==
As well as acting in the film, Shaquille O'Neal contributed to the soundtrack for the film. The single "Men of Steel" has him featured alongside rappers KRS-One, Ice Cube, B-Real, and Peter Gunz. The soundtrack was released on Quincy Jones' record label Qwest Records and included songs featured in the film and songs inspired by it. The album charted in the United States on the Billboard 200 at number 185 and on the Top R&B/Hip-Hop Albums at number 26.

== Release ==
=== Home media ===
The film was released on VHS and LaserDisc in 1997 by Warner Home Video.

The film was released on DVD in 2010 by the Warner Archive Collection.

== Reception ==
=== Box office ===
Steel was released in the United States on August 15, 1997, making only $870,068 across 1,260 theaters on its opening weekend. With a second weekend decline of 78%, it achieved the record for having the biggest sophomore weekend drop for any superhero film, being tied with The Marvels in 2023. The film bombed at the box office, earning just $1.7 million domestically with an estimated budget of $16 million.

=== Critical response ===
On the review aggregator website Rotten Tomatoes, 8% of 25 critics' reviews are positive, with an average rating of 3/10. The website's consensus reads: "Steel is a badly-acted movie that indulges not only in superhero cliches, but also the sappy TV-movie-of-the-week ones." Metacritic, which uses a weighted average, assigned the film a score of 28 out of 100, based on 12 critics, indicating "generally unfavorable" reviews. Audiences polled by CinemaScore gave the film an average grade of "B" on an A+ to F scale.

Leonard Kladly of Variety wrote that the film is "too broad and episodic to attract anything other than the most undemanding crowd".

Peter Stack of the San Francisco Chronicle described it as a "tolerable stinker of a film" that "plays like a Saturday morning cartoon".

Lawrence Van Gelder of The New York Times stated that the film is "slow to gather momentum and generates little excitement or tension".

=== Accolades ===
Shaquille O'Neal earned a Razzie Award nomination as Worst Actor for his performance in the film, but lost against Kevin Costner for The Postman.
