= Def Jef =

American rapper

- Born: Jeffrey A. Fortson; September 27, 1966 (age 60); Manhattan, New York City, U.S.
- Genre: Hip hop
- Occupations: Rapper; music producer; actor; writer
- Years active: 1984–present
- Labels: Delicious Vinyl; Thugline

Jeffrey Fortson (born September 27, 1966), better known by the stage name Def Jef, is an American alternative hip hop musician and rapper of the late 1980s and early 1990s. He was born in Harlem, New York City.

His debut album was 1989's Just a Poet with a Soul, which won critical acclaim for sociopolitical lyrics and original beats. Additionally, he was a member of the West Coast Rap All-Stars, a collaboration of West Coast-based hip hop artists who released the anti-violence single "We're All in the Same Gang" in 1990. He performed on the television variety show In Living Color in 1990.

After his second album, Soul Food, was released, Def Jef moved into production full-time. Since the 1990s, he has produced, written, arranged and remixed artists including Nas, Snoop Doggy Dogg, Mary J. Blige, Kimberley Locke, Maxwell, Avant, Tupac Shakur, and Shaquille O'Neal. He has worked with Krayzie Bone and Thugline Records.

He produced the theme songs for the Disney sitcom That's So Raven and The Game.

Def Jef also appeared in the feature film Deep Cover in 1992.

== Discography ==
- 1989: Just a Poet with Soul
- 1990: "We're All in the Same Gang" (single) (as part of the West Coast Rap All-Stars)
- 1991: Soul Food

Production Credits
Year	Song	Artist	Album
1989	Hi Powered	Body & Soul	Non-album single
1989	En La Casa	Mellow Man Ace	Escape from Havana
1991	Mean Green	Tone-Loc	Cool Hand Lōc
1992	Good Things Don't Last; Let It Move You; Forward Bound; Best in Me	The Poetess	Simply Poetry
1993	Deeper; Process of Elimination; 1800 Bodies	Boss	Born Gangster
1993	I Know I Got Skillz; I ate to Brag	Shaquille O'Neal, Def Jef	Shaq Diesel
1993	I Know I Got Skillz Remix	Shaquille O'Neal, Def Jef	Non-album single
1994	The Right Kinda Lover (Def Jef Remix)	Patti LaBelle	Non-album single
1994	Life's a Bitch (Arsenal Mix)	Nas, AZ	Non-album single
1994	Out of Control	Wells	NBA Jam Session
1994	Cherish This Love; Don't Let Me Catch You Slippin'	Brigette McWilliams	Take Advantage of Me
1994	Shaq-Fu: Stand and Deliver	Shaq	Shaq Fu: Da Return
1996	80 Ways	Def Jef	Phat Beach (soundtrack)
1996	"Gee, Officer Krupke"	Salt-n-Pepa, Left Eye, Jerky Boyz	The Songs of West Side Story
1997	"I'm Loosin' It"	2Pac, Big Skye	R U Still Down?
1997	Under Pressure	Nadanuf	Worldwide
1999	Betta Dayz	Snoop Dogg	No Limit Top Dogg
2000	Tha Eastsidaz	Tha Eastsidaz	Snoop Dogg Presents: Tha Eastsidaz
2001	Late Night	Tha Eastsidaz	Duces 'n Trayz: The Old Fashioned Way
2001	Shackled Up	Krayzie Bone	Oz (soundtrack)
2001	A Thugga Level; I Don't Give a Fuck	Krayzie Bone	Thug on da Line
