= Shaq Diesel =

Studio album by Shaquille O'Neal
- Released: October 26, 1993
- Recorded: 1992–1993
- Studio: Parc Studios (Orlando, FL); Platinum Post (Winter Park, FL); Beat Street Studios (North Hollywood, CA); Battery Studios
- Genre: East Coast hip hop
- Length: 41:02
- Label: Jive
- Producer: Ali Shaheed Muhammad; Def Jef; Erick Sermon; K-Cut; Meech Wells

Shaquille O'Neal chronology
Shaq Diesel (1993)	Shaq Fu: Da Return (1994)

Singles from Shaq Diesel
- 1. "What's Up Doc? (Can We Rock)" Released: June 8, 1993; 2. "(I Know I Got) Skillz" Released: September 7, 1993; 3. "I'm Outstanding" Released: November 10, 1993; 4. "Shoot Pass Slam" Released: January 4, 1994

Professional ratings
Review scores
Source	Rating
AllMusic	2.5/5 stars
NME	7/10

Shaq Diesel is the debut studio album by American professional basketball player and rapper Shaquille O'Neal. It was released on October 26, 1993, through Jive Records.

The recording sessions took place at Parc Studios in Orlando, Platinum Post in Winter Park, Beat Street Studios in North Hollywood, and Battery Studios. The album was produced by Erick Sermon, Def Jef, Meech Wells, K-Cut, and Ali Shaheed Muhammad, with Colin Wolfe serving as co-producer. It features guest appearances from Phife Dawg, Fu-Schnickens and Def Jef.

Despite mixed reviews, the album became a surprising success, reaching No. 25 on the Billboard 200 and No. 10 on the Top R&B/Hip-Hop Albums in the United States and eventually achieving platinum status by the Recording Industry Association of America on March 21, 1994, for shipping of one million copies.

Three singles from the album also managed to fare well on the charts, with "What's Up Doc? (Can We Rock)" peaked at No. 39, "(I Know I Got) Skillz" at No. 35 and "I'm Outstanding" at No. 47 on the Billboard Hot 100. The first two singles were certified gold by the RIAA for shipping of 500,000 units. A fourth single entitled "Shoot Pass Slam" was also released, but did not make it to the Billboard charts.

== Track listing ==
No.	Title	Writer(s)	Producer(s)	Length
1.	"Intro"		Def Jef; Meech Wells	1:48
2.	"(I Know I Got) Skillz" (featuring Def Jef)	Shaquille O'Neal; Jeffrey Fortson; Cecil Demetrius Womack Jr.	Def Jef; Meech Wells	4:23
3.	"I'm Outstanding"	O'Neal; Erick Sermon; Raymond Calhoun; Alisa Peoples Yarbrough	Erick Sermon	4:07
4.	"Where Ya At?" (featuring Phife Dawg)	O'Neal; Malik Taylor; Ali Shaheed Muhammad	Ali Shaheed Muhammad	4:44
5.	"I Hate 2 Brag"	O'Neal; Fortson; Womack Jr.; Herbie Hancock	Def Jef; Meech Wells	4:32
6.	"Let Me in, Let Me In"	O'Neal	Erick Sermon; Colin Wolfe (co.)	3:02
7.	"Shoot Pass Slam"	O'Neal; Sermon	Erick Sermon	3:31
8.	"Boom!" (featuring Erick Sermon & Fu-Schnickens)	O'Neal; Sermon; Roderick Roachford; Lennox Maturine; Joseph A. Jones	Erick Sermon	3:00
9.	"Are You a Roughneck?"	O'Neal; Roachford; Maturine; Jones	K-Cut	3:42
10.	"Giggin' on 'Em" (featuring Phife Dawg)	O'Neal; Taylor; Muhammad	Dr. "?"	4:07
11.	"What's Up Doc? (Can We Rock)" (featuring Fu-Schnickens)	O'Neal; Roachford; Maturine; Jones; Kevin McKenzie	K-Cut	3:52
12.	"Game Over"			0:10
Total length:				41:02

Sample credits

- Track 2 contains a sample of "Snake Eyes" written by Shawn McKenzie, Kevin McKenzie and William Mitchell and performed by Main Source.
- Track 3 contains samples of "Outstanding" written by Raymond Calhoun and performed by the Gap Band, "The Payback" written by James Brown, John Starks and Fred Wesley and performed by James Brown, and "Don't Stop the Music" written and performed by Yarbrough and Peoples.
- Track 5 contains samples of "Watermelon Man" written and performed by Herbie Hancock, "Kalism" written and performed by the Kali Tribe, and "Basketball Throwdown" performed by the Cold Crush Brothers & Fantastic Freaks.
- Track 6 contains a sample of "Wrath of My Madness" written by Dana Owens and Mark James and performed by Queen Latifah.
- Track 7 contains a sample of "Tarzan" written and performed by Johnny "Guitar" Watson.
- Track 10 contains a sample of a performance by Sam Kinison.

== Charts ==
=== Weekly charts ===
Chart (1993)	Peak position
US Billboard 200	25
US Top R&B/Hip-Hop Albums (Billboard)	10

=== Year-end charts ===
Chart (1994)	Position
US Billboard 200	100
US Top R&B/Hip-Hop Albums (Billboard)	54

== Certifications ==
Region	Certification	Certified units/sales
United States (RIAA)	Platinum	1,000,000^{^}
^{^} Shipments figures based on certification alone.
