= Lord Tariq and Peter Gunz =

American hip hop group

Background information
- Origin: The Bronx, New York City, U.S.
- Genres: East Coast hip-hop
- Years active: 1996–1999
- Label: Columbia
- Past members: Lord Tariq; Peter Gunz

Lord Tariq and Peter Gunz were an American hip hop duo, composed of rappers Sean "Lord Tariq" Hamilton and Peter "Peter Gunz" Pankey, from The Bronx, New York. They are best known for their 1997 single "Deja Vu (Uptown Baby)", which reached the top ten on the U.S. Billboard Hot 100.

== Career ==
Initially performing as The Gunrunners, the duo made their debut on Whodini's 1996 album Six, on which they featured on the track "Can't Get Enough" and assisted in the writing of two other tracks. Peter Gunz collaborated with Shaquille O'Neal on the latter's albums You Can't Stop the Reign (1996) and Respect (1998), in addition to the single "Men of Steel" from O'Neal's film Steel (1997). Lord Tariq worked with Jay-Z and Nas on the 1996 single "Analyze This" and featured on rapper Cuban Link's posse cut "Men of Business" which also featured N.O.R.E., Kool G Rap and M.O.P.

Their debut single, "Deja Vu (Uptown Baby)", was released in December 1997 and sampled the 1977 Steely Dan song "Black Cow". It peaked at #9 on the Billboard Hot 100, topped the Billboard Hot Rap Songs chart, and reached #21 on the UK Singles Chart in May 1998. The single was certified platinum by the RIAA for sales of over one million.

Following the track's success, Lord Tariq and Peter Gunz released their only album in 1998, Make It Reign, which peaked at #38 on the Billboard 200 and #8 on the Billboard Top R&B/Hip-Hop Albums charts. Despite containing guest appearances by Big Pun, Fat Joe, Sticky Fingaz, Kurupt and Cam'ron, the album failed to produce further hits.

The pair broke up in 1999 without releasing any other material.

=== Later career ===
From 2013 to 2020, Peter Gunz has appeared on the VH1 reality series Love & Hip Hop: New York and then hosted the long running reality series Cheaters until its finale in 2021. He was married to singer Amina Schmahl. His son, Peter Cory Pankey Jr. (born 1987), is a rapper who goes by the stage name of Cory Gunz and was signed to Young Money Entertainment, the Cash Money Records imprint founded by rapper Lil Wayne.

In June 2005, Lord Tariq released a non-charting solo album, The Barcode, that featured both Peter and Cory Gunz. In 2007, Lord Tariq joined the underground rap group Bang Bang Boogie, which consisted of him, Mysonne, Cuban Link, and brothers Hocus 45th and S-One. Tariq released two mixtapes with the group before disbanding due to Hocus and S-One being wrongly incarcerated, which eventually caused the group to disband.

== Discography ==
=== Lord Tariq & Peter Gunz ===
Year	Title	Peak chart positions	
Year	Title	US	US R&B
1998	Make It Reign: Released: June 2, 1998; Label: Columbia	38	8

=== Lord Tariq ===
Year	Title	Peak chart positions	
Year	Title	US	US R&B
2005	The Barcode: Released: June 23, 2005; Label: Team Saga	—	—

== Filmography ==
=== Peter Gunz ===
Television
Year	Title	Role	Notes
2013–20	Love & Hip Hop: New York	Himself	63 episodes
2017	Marriage Boot Camp: Reality Stars	Himself	11 episodes
2020–2021	Cheaters	Himself	Ended

== Personal life ==
=== Peter Gunz ===
Peter Gunz has ten children: rapper Cory Gunz, Whitney, Kennedi, Brandon, Phoenix, Jamison, Kaz, Cori, Gunner, and Bronx. Peter has two granddaughters.
