= Kokane discography =

This is the discography for American recording artist Kokane.

== Albums ==
=== Studio albums ===
- Addictive Hip Hop Muzick (1991)
- Funk Upon a Rhyme (1994)
- They Call Me Mr. Kane (1999)
- Mr. Kane, Pt. 2 (2005)
- Pain Killer'z (2005)
- Back 2 tha Clap (2006)
- Gimme All Mine (2010)
- The Legend Continues (2011)
- Shut da F Up & Cut da Checc (2014)
- Lady Kokane Presents: Kokane Love Songs (2015)
- King of GFunk (2016)
- Lady Kokane Presents: Kokane Love Songs Vol 2 (2017)
- It's Kokane Not Lemonhead (2017)
- Finger Roll (2019)
- Da Funkin Adventures of Dr. Kokanstine: Album Trilogy (2024)

=== Collaboration albums ===
- Gangstarock with Chris Gentry (2002)
- The Hood Mob with Contraband & Cricet (2006)
- Raine n Lane n Kokane with Raine n Lane (2008)
- The New Frontier with Traffik (2012)
- Tha Kemistry!! (Joint Album) with Tonik Slam (2018)

=== Compilation albums ===
- Don't Bite the Funk Vol. 1 (2003)
- Kokane's 24th Anniversary Album (2015)

=== Mixtapes ===
- On the Back Streets hosted by DJ Crazy Toones (2010)
- Dr. Kokastien hosted by DJ King Assassin (2012)

== Guest appearances ==
Year	Song	Artist(s)	Album
1991	"Prelude"	N.W.A	Niggaz4Life
1991	"4 the Funk of It" (featuring Kokane)	Above the Law	Vocally Pimpin'
1992	"Neighborhood Sniper" (featuring Kokane & Cold 187um)	Eazy-E	5150: Home 4 tha Sick
1993	"Game Wreck-Oniz-Iz Game" (featuring Kokane & Eazy-E)	Above the Law	Black Mafia Life
1993	"Any Last Werdz" (featuring Kokane & Cold 187um)	Eazy-E	It's On (~~Dr. Dre~~) 187^{um} Killa
1994	"Return of the Real Shit" (featuring Kokane)	Above the Law	Uncle Sam's Curse
1994	"Kalifornia" (featuring Kokane)	Above the Law	Uncle Sam's Curse
1994	"Rain Be for Rain Bo" (featuring Kokane)	Above the Law	Uncle Sam's Curse
1994	"Everything Will Be Alright" (featuring Kokane)	Above the Law	Uncle Sam's Curse
1994	"Who Ryde" (featuring Kokane & Tone Loc)	Above the Law	Uncle Sam's Curse
1994	"Gangsta Madness" (featuring Kokane)	Above the Law	Uncle Sam's Curse
1995	"Drama" (featuring Kokane)	Spice 1	1990-Sick
1995	"Faces of Death" (featuring Kokane)	Spice 1	1990-Sick
1995	"Last Days" (featuring Kokane & Above the Law)	Frost	Smile Now, Die Later
1996	"4 Tha E" (featuring Kokane)	DJ Yella	One Mo Nigga ta Go
1996	"Opening Doors" (featuring Kokane)	Mac Mall	Untouchable
1996	"Nickel Slick Nigga" (Performed by Kokane)	Dr. Dre	First Round Knock Out
1996	"Gorillapimpin'" (featuring Kokane & Enuff)	Above the Law	Time Will Reveal
1996	"Clinic 2000" (featuring Kokane, Daddy Cool & Enuff)	Above the Law	Time Will Reveal
1996	"Circumstances" (featuring Kokane, Luniz, Cold 187um, Celly Cel & T-Pup)	E-40	Tha Hall of Game
1997	"Recognize Game" (featuring Kokane, Ice-T & Too Short)	Spice 1	The Black Bossalini
1997	"My Soul To Keep" (featuring Kokane)	Brotha Lynch Hung	Loaded
1998	"Love Don't Love" (featuring Kokane)	Jayo Felony	Whatcha Gonna Do?
1999	"Big Figgas" (featuring Kokane, AK & 151)	C-Bo	The Final Chapter
1999	"Fast Money" (featuring Kokane, Warren G & Dutches)	Mac Dre	Rapper Gone Bad
1999	"Some L.A. Niggaz" (featuring Kokane, Defari, Hittman, Xzibit, Knoc-Turn'al, Time Bomb, King T & MC Ren)	Dr. Dre	2001
2000	"Ghetto" (featuring Kokane, Kam & Nate Dogg)	Tha Eastsidaz	Tha Eastsidaz
2000	"Pimp or Die" (featuring Kokane & Techniec)	Mack 10	The Paper Route
2000	"Concrete Jungle" (featuring Kokane, Goldie Loc, Tray Deee & Snoop Dogg)	C-Murder	Trapped in Crime
2000	"Pimp Shit" (featuring Kokane)	Too Short	You Nasty
2000	"Shut Up" (featuring Kokane, Ice-T & Too Short)	T.W.D.Y.	Lead the Way
2000	"Like a Jungle" (featuring Kokane & Young Mugzi)	E-40	Loyalty and Betrayal
2000	"Keep Your Head Up" (featuring Kokane)	Doggy's Angels	Pleezbaleevit!
2000	"Hoodtraps" (featuring Kokane & Snoop Dogg)	Doggy's Angels	Pleezbaleevit!
2000	"Put Your Hands Up" (featuring Kokane, Snoop Dogg, Soopafly, King Lou & Ruff Dogg)	Doggy's Angels	Pleezbaleevit!
2000	"Rimz & Tirez" (featuring Kokane, Defari & Goldie Loc)	Xzibit	Restless
2000	"Hennesey'n Buddah" (featuring Kokane)	Snoop Dogg	Tha Last Meal
2000	"True Lies" (featuring Kokane)	Snoop Dogg	Tha Last Meal
2000	"Wrong Idea" (featuring Kokane, Bad Azz & Lil' ½ Dead)	Snoop Dogg	Tha Last Meal
2000	"Go Away" (featuring Kokane)	Snoop Dogg	Tha Last Meal
2000	"Bring It On" (featuring Kokane & Suga Free)	Snoop Dogg	Tha Last Meal
2000	"Y'all Gone Miss Me" (featuring Kokane)	Snoop Dogg	Tha Last Meal
2001	"Dollaz, Drank & Dank" (featuring Kokane)	Mr. Short Khop	Da Khop Shop
2001	"Es Mi Casa" (featuring Kokane)	Mr. Short Khop	Da Khop Shop
2001	"So Ignorant" (featuring Kokane, Kurupt & Nate Dogg)	Yukmouth	Thug Lord: The New Testament
2001	"Lonely" (featuring Kokane, Mark Curry & Kain)	P. Diddy & The Bad Boy Family	The Saga Continues...
2001	"When You See Me" (featuring Kokane & RBX)	Bad Azz	Personal Business
2001	"Dogghouse Ridaz" (featuring Kokane, Suga Free, Goldie Loc & Snoop Dogg)	Bad Azz	Personal Business
2001	"Wrong Idea" (featuring Kokane, Snoop Dogg & Lil' ½ Dead)	Bad Azz	Personal Business
2001	"Friends" (featuring Kokane)	Tha Eastsidaz	Duces 'n Trayz: The Old Fashioned Way
2001	"I Pledge Allegiance" (featuring Kokane & Soopafly)	Tha Eastsidaz	Duces 'n Trayz: The Old Fashioned Way
2001	"Now Is the Time" (featuring Kokane)	Tha Eastsidaz	Duces 'n Trayz: The Old Fashioned Way
2001	"Connected" (featuring Kokane & Mobb Deep)	Tha Eastsidaz	Duces 'n Trayz: The Old Fashioned Way
2001	"Sticky Fingers" (featuring Kokane & Rick Rock)	Tha Eastsidaz	Duces 'n Trayz: The Old Fashioned Way
2001	"Late Night" (featuring Kokane)	Tha Eastsidaz	Duces 'n Trayz: The Old Fashioned Way
2001	"Everywhere I Go" (featuring Kokane)	Tha Eastsidaz	Duces 'n Trayz: The Old Fashioned Way
2001	"Ass on Your Shoulders" (featuring Kokane)	Busta Rhymes	Genesis
2001	"L.I.F.E." (featuring Kokane)	Cypress Hill	Stoned Raiders
2001	"G-funk Is Here 2 Stay" (featuring Kokane & Mista Grimm)	Warren G	The Return of the Regulator
2001	"Back It Up" (featuring Kokane)	Ras Kass	Van Gogh (unreleased)
2001	"Root$ Of Evil" (featuring Kokane)	Ras Kass	Van Gogh (unreleased)
2001	"Cali Way" (featuring Kokane & Tray Deee)	Mr. Mash	—N/a
2002	"Cowboy" (featuring Kokane)	C-Bo	Life as a Rider
2002	"Thuggin'" (featuring Kokane & Tray Deee)	Spice 1	Spiceberg Slim
2002	"7 Much" (featuring Kokane)	E-40	Grit & Grind
2002	"Clap Yo Handz" (IV Life Family & Kokane)	Tray Deee	The General's List
2002	"Bellin'" (featuring Kokane)	WC	Ghetto Heisman
2002	"Paper'd Up" (featuring Kokane & Traci Nelson)	Snoop Dogg	Paid tha Cost to Be da Boss
2003	"So What" (featuring Kokane, Masta Ace & Pretty Ugly)	Prince Paul	Politics of the Business
2003	"Get Ready" (featuring Kokane)	Roscoe	Friday After Next and Young Roscoe Philaphornia
2003	"Take Yo Fade" (featuring Kokane, Crooked I & Eastwood)	Boo-Yaa T.R.I.B.E.	West Koasta Nostra
2004	"High Heels" (featuring Kokane)	Suga Free	The New Testament (The Truth)
2004	"Gutta" (featuring Kokane & KMG)	Cold 187um	Live from the Ghetto
2004	"Make You Wanna" (featuring Kokane, Warren G & Johnny Chronic)	Goldie Loc	Still Eastsidin'
2004	"Gangsta Groove" (featuring Kokane)	Goldie Loc	Still Eastsidin'
2004	"Nite Locs" (featuring Kokane & Snoop Dogg)	Goldie Loc	Still Eastsidin'
2004	"Can't Help It" (featuring Kokane, Mr. Short Khop & Tray Deee)	Goldie Loc	Still Eastsidin'
2005	"Gangstas Keep Bumpin They Head'" (featuring Kokane & Lebo)	Goldie Loc	Loc'd Out
2005	"I'm So High" (featuring Kokane)	Tony Yayo	Thoughts of a Predicate Felon
2006	"Suga Cane" (featuring Kokane)	Suga Free	Just Add Water
2006	"Spittin' Pollaseeds" (featuring Kokane & WC)	Ice Cube	Laugh Now, Cry Later
2006	"I Betcha" (featuring Kokane & Prodigy)	The Alchemist	No Days Off
2007	"Haters" (featuring Kokane)	Young Buck	Buck the World
2007	"Last Words" (Bonus Track) (featuring Kokane)	Prodigy & The Alchemist	Return of the Mac
2007	"U Don't Know Who U Fuckin' Wit" (featuring Kokane)	Kurupt	Against tha Grain E.P.
2007	"From Behind" (featuring Kokane & Keak da Sneak)	Coolie High	Coolwadda VS. Coolie High
2007	"Keep It Hood" (featuring Kokane)	Goldie Loc	Eastsideridaz
2008	"Hard Liquor" (featuring Kokane, uncredited)	The Game	Compton King
2008	"Sooo Comfortable" (featuring Kokane, uncredited)	Murs	Murs for President
2008	"Hate on Me" (featuring Kokane)	Kurupt & Roscoe	The Frank and Jess Story
2008	"Where Ya Gonna Go" (featuring Kokane)	Kurupt & Roscoe	The Frank and Jess Story
2008	"No Time To Waste" (featuring Kokane, Rob Quest & T-Mac)	Kurupt & Roscoe	The Frank and Jess Story
2008	"Paranoid" (Bloc Boyz featuring Kokane)	Glasses Malone	Monster's Ink
2009	"Life" (featuring Kokane)	Above the Law	Sex, Money & Music
2009	"Gutta" (featuring Kokane)	Above the Law	Sex, Money & Music
2009	"Wet Paint" (featuring Kokane)	Tash	Control Freek
2009	"West Coast Kiss" (featuring Kokane & Kartoon)	Jadakiss	Kiss My Ass (The Champ Is Here Pt.2)
2009	"Shawty Wanna Thug" (featuring Kokane)	Lil' Flip	Respect Me
2009	"Tha Liquor Store" (featuring Kokane)	Dogg Pound	That Was Then, This Is Now
2009	"Secrets" (featuring Kokane)	Snoop Dogg	Malice n Wonderland
2010	"Mr. Untouchable" (featuring Kokane)	Nipsey Hussle	The Marathon
2011	"What's Good" (featuring Kokane)	WC	Revenge of the Barracuda
2011	"Take U Home" (featuring Kokane, Too Short & Daz Dillinger)	Snoop Dogg	Doggumentary
2011	"Letcha Nutz Hang" (featuring Kokane, Tony Yayo & Jayo Felony)	40 Glocc	C.O.P.S (Criping On Public Streets)
2011	"Everywhere I Go" (featuring Kokane, RBX & Tha Chill)	Daddy V	The Original Hustla
2012	"Shut Up Nancy" (featuring Kokane)	Too Short	No Trespassing
2012	"What You Smoking On" (featuring Kokane, Snoop Dogg & Tha Dogg Pound)	E-40	The Block Brochure: Welcome to the Soil 3
2012	"Killas Like Me" (featuring Kokane, Killa Tay & Lil Cyco)	C-Bo	Orca
2013	"Fux Wit No Bustaz" (featuring Kokane)	Big Bossolo	Everything Aint Always N Color
2013	"Heart Don't Pump No Kool Aid" (featuring Kokane)	Big Bossolo	The Birth Revival
2015	"Whoever God Is" (featuring Kokane, Devapink, James Wade & Kurupt)	EDIDON	The Hope Dealer, Pt. 1
2015	"Whoever God Is" (featuring Kokane)	MC Eiht & Freddie Gibbs	Welcome to Los Santos
2016	"INvocation" (featuring Kokane)	Ab-Soul	Do What Thou Wilt.
2016	"The Return" (featuring Kokane)	Big Tray Deee	The 3rd Coming
2016	"Wild West" Single (featuring Kokane & MC Eiht)	Y-Dresta	Player 1
2016	"Wild West" Swishahouse Remix (featuring Kokane, Michael "5000" Watts & MC Eiht)	Y-Dresta	Player 1
2017	"In My Shoes" (featuring Kokane & Eastwood)	Lazy Dubb	Narco Valley (Original Motion Picture Soundtrack)
2017	"In the Wind" (featuring Kokane, Compton Menace & Eastwood)	Lazy Dubb	Narco Valley (Original Motion Picture Soundtrack)
2017	"Looking down from Heaven" (featuring Kokane & E.D.I. Mean)	Rappin' 4-Tay	—N/a
2018	"Ain't the Same" (featuring Kokane)	Daz Dillinger	Dazamataz
2018	"Show Some Respect" (featuring Kokane & Yung Zeke)	Daz Dillinger	Dazamataz
2018	"N My Blood Cuzz" (featuring Kokane, Goldie Loc & AD)	Daz Dillinger	Dazamataz
2018	"Doggytails" (featuring Kokane)	Snoop Dogg	220
2018	"Walk In My Shoes" (featuring Kokane)	Berner	Rico
2019	"Please Forgive Me" (featuring Kokane)	Weazel Loc	Gangsta Guaranteed
2019	"Who Dat Who Dat" (featuring Kokane)	Weazel Loc	Gangsta Guaranteed
2019	"Put That On Diirtyz" (featuring Kokane & Tha Chill)	Weazel Loc	Gangsta Guaranteed
2019	"To My Niggaz And My Bitches" (featuring Kokane & Tha Chill)	Weazel Loc	Gangsta Guaranteed
2019	"Hole In My Heart" (featuring Kokane)	Suga Free	The Resurrection
2021	"Talk Dat Shit to Me" (featuring Kokane)	Snoop Dogg	From tha Streets 2 tha Suites
2022	“Rocketship” Featuring: Bootsy Collins, Kokane	Fantaazma	Non-Album Single
2025	"We Belong" (featuring Kokane)	Young Buck	Target Practice
2026	"Goin' Down" (featuring Kokane)	Rakim, Kurupt, Masta Killa	The Godbody LP
