= The Features, Vol. 1 =

Compilation album by Suga Free
- Released: August 22, 2006
- Recorded: 1998–2006
- Genre: Hip hop
- Label: Siccness
- Producer: Suga Free (exec.), Battlecat, DJ Quik, JellyRoll

Suga Free chronology
The Features, Vol. 1 (2006)	The Features, Vol. 2 (2006)

The Features, Vol. 1 is the first compilation album by rapper Suga Free, it was released on August 22, 2006. The album features songs that Suga Free has appeared on throughout the 1998-2006.

== Track listing ==
=== Disc 1 ===
#	Title	Features(s)	Producer(s)	Album	Length
1	"Angry Enough"		DJ Quik	The New Testament (The Truth)	3:25
2	"Don't Fight Da Pimpin'"		DJ Quik	The New Testament (The Truth)	3:02
3	"Trouble (Remix)"	DJ Quik, Beanie Sigel	DJ Quik	Under tha Influence	3:26
4	"If U Stay Ready (Remix)"		DJ Quik, Robert "Fonksta" Bacon, G-One	How to Be a Player	4:54
5	"Do I Love Her?"	DJ Quik	DJ Quik	Balance & Options	4:06
6	"I Don't Know"	Tha Eastsidaz	Battlecat	Duces 'n Trayz: The Old Fashioned Way	4:07
7	"Bring It On"	Snoop Dogg, Kokane	JellyRoll	Tha Last Meal	4:16
8	"No Doubt"	DJ Quik, Playa Hamm	DJ Quik	Rhythm-al-ism	4:11
9	"Till The Dawn"	E-40, Bosko	Bosko	Grit & Grind	4:39
10	"Woop Woop"	Hi-C	Hi-C	The Hi-Life Hustle	3:59
11	"Game Tight"	Dru Down, AMG	Keytek & C&H	Gangsta Pimpin'	4:11
12	"Abracadabra"	Bad Azz, Jake $teed	T-Boner	Jake's Latest & Greatest (The Soundtrack)	4:35
13	"Whistle"		DJ Quik	The Konnectid Project, Vol. 1	4:32
14	"Eroctica Chic"	Triga, Cowboy	Suga Free	—	3:39

=== Disc 2 ===
#	Title	Features(s)	Producer(s)	Album	Length
1	"Get The Money"	DJ Quik	DJ Quik	Under tha Influence	2:43
2	"Do You Really"		DJ Quik	—	3:02
3	"Sorry I'm Away So Much"	Xzibit, DJ Quik	DJ Quik	Restless	3:55
4	"Rug Burns"	Tha Eastsidaz, Kokane	Battlecat	Free Tray Deee... Volume 1	4:09
5	"What U Thought"	B-Legit	Bosko	Hard 2 B-Legit	3:44
6	"First Date"	Perfec, Rappin' 4-Tay	Perfec	Best Kept Secret	4:46
7	"Trust Me"	Snoop Dogg, Sylk-E. Fyne	Bud'da	No Limit Top Dogg	4:05
8	"The Way You Love Me"		SACCS	The Wild West	3:17
9	"Pussy Sells"	Tha Eastsidaz	L.T. Hutton	Tha Eastsidaz	4:11
10	"Inside Out"	AMG, DJ Quik	DJ Quik	—	3:11
11	"Let's Get Together"		DJ Quik	—	3:33
12	"Don't Walk Away"	DJ Quik, James DeBarge	DJ Quik	The Konnectid Project, Vol. 1	4:10
13	"Dogghouse Ridaz"	Bad Azz, Snoop Dogg, Goldie Loc, Kokane	Battlecat	Personal Business	3:16
14	"Little Box"	Mr. Shadow	Suga Free	Pit Bossing	3:41
