= The Legend Continues =

The Legend Continues may refer:

- Anchorman 2: The Legend Continues, a 2013 American comedy film
- Dragonworld: The Legend Continues, a 1999 adventure fantasy film
- Kung Fu: The Legend Continues, a spin-off of the 1972–1975 television series Kung Fu
- The Legend Continues (album), a 2012 album by Kokane
