= The Hood Mob =

Studio album by Kokane
- Released: March 21, 2006
- Recorded: 2006
- Genre: Hip hop
- Length: 1:08:12
- Label: Siccness
- Producer: Cricet; Ecay Uno

Kokane chronology
Mr. Kane, Pt. 2 (2004)	The Hood Mob (2006)	Back 2 tha Clap (2006)

Kokane Presents The Hood Mob is the only studio album by American hip hop group The Hood Mob, consisted of Kokane, Contraband and Cricet. It was released on March 21, 2006, via Siccness.net.

== Track listing ==
1. "Intro"
2. "Invasion of the Body Snatchers"
3. "Killa Cali" feat. Complex
4. "From da Hood" feat. Bay Loc & Cutthroat
5. "Skit"
6. "It's On, on Sight"
7. "Mission Impossible" Skit
8. "Get At You"
9. "The Robbery"
10. "Momma" feat. Mitchy Slick
11. "The Gutter" feat. Eclipse & Steve Vicious
12. "The Black Hole" feat. Damu
13. "I Can Understand It"
14. "Push"
15. "Take Yo Panties Off"
16. "My Life"
17. "The Hood Mob, Pt. 2"
18. "Zoo"
19. "Outro"
