= Mr. Short Khop =

American rapper

- Born: Lionel Hunt
- Origin: Inglewood, California, U.S.
- Genres: Hip-hop; g-funk; gangsta rap
- Occupation: Rapper
- Years active: 1996–present

Lionel Hunt, better known by his stage name Mr. Short Khop (pronounced as "Short Chop") is an American rapper. He encountered Ice Cube in front of a 7-Eleven convenience store in South Central, California. Ice Cube eventually struck a deal with the newcomer, and soon Short Khop made guest appearances in Ice Cube's 1998 War & Peace Vol. 1 (The War Disc). To return the favor, Ice Cube appeared on Short Khop's debut 2001 album, Da Khop Shop. Khop was mentioned in William Shaw's 1999 book Westsider's. To date, he has not released a follow-up to his debut album.

== Discography ==
=== Albums ===
Year	Title	Chart positions		
Year	Title	Billboard 200	Heatseekers	Top R&B/Hip hop albums
2001	Da Khop Shop	#154	#7	#34

=== Singles ===
Year	Song	Chart position		Album
Year	Song	Hot rap singles	Hot R&B/Hip-hop singles	Album
2001	"Dollaz, Drank & Dank"	#2	#59	Da Khop Shop

=== Guest appearances ===
List of non-single guest appearances, with other performing artists, showing year released and album name
Title	Year	Other artist(s)	Album
"Who Are You Lovin'"	1998	Ice Cube	The Players Club: Music From and Inspired by the Motion Picture
"Dreamin'"	1998	Emmage, Lil' Mo	The Players Club: Music From and Inspired by the Motion Picture
"Pushin' Weight"	1998	Ice Cube	War & Peace Vol. 1 (The War Disc)
"If I Was Fuckin' You"	1998	Ice Cube, K-Mac	War & Peace Vol. 1 (The War Disc)
"Limos, Demos, and Bimbos"	1998	Ice Cube, Ice Cube	
"If You See Me"	Kurupt, Baby S, El-Drex, Trigga	Kuruption!	
"1999"	1999	Kokane, Peeps Game	They Call Me Mr. Kane
"Y'all Prankstas"	2002	C-Bo, CJ Mac, Cryciz	West Coast Mafia
"Heated"	2003	Boo-Yaa T.R.I.B.E.	West Koasta Nostra
"title"	2004	Goldie Loc, Tray Dee, Kokane	Still Eastsidin'
"Short Khop Interlude"	2006	Suga Free	Just Add Water
"The Reason Why"	2014	Daz Dilly, Young Buck, Bo$$, Murphy Lee	Weed Money
"Plastic Surgery"	2015	Kokane	King Of G-Funk
