= Still Eastsidin' =

Studio album by Goldie Loc
- Released: October 4, 2004
- Recorded: 2004
- Genre: Rap

Goldie Loc chronology
Still Eastsidin' (2004)	Loc'd Out (2005)

Still Eastsidin' is Goldie Loc's debut album.

== Track listing ==
1. Loc'd Out World
2. Dick Hard
3. Killa Holiday (featuring Seven & Boo-Ru)
4. Everything (featuring Tray Deee)
5. The Craziest (featuring Snoop Dogg)
6. Pimp (featuring Tha Eastsidaz)
7. Back Up Hoe (featuring Snoop Dogg)
8. Make You Wanna (featuring Kokane, Warren G & Johnny Chronic)
9. G'd Up (featuring Tha Eastsidaz)
10. Real In The Field (featuring Tray Deee & Warren G)
11. Ride Wit' Us (featuring Tray Deee & F.T.)
12. Gangsta Groove (featuring Kokane)
13. Nite Locs (featuring Kokane & Snoop Dogg)
14. Pop Lockin' (featuring Silkk The Shocker & Snoop Dogg)
15. Can't Help It (featuring Short Khop, Tray Deee & Kokane)
16. Run On Up (featuring Tha Eastsidaz)
17. D.P.G.C.: You Know What I'm Throwin' Up (featuring Daz Dillinger & Snoop Dogg)
18. They Ain't Finna Take My Shit (featuring Pomona City Rydaz, Tray Deee & Suga Free)
19. Bring It Back (featuring Kurupt & Snoop Dogg)
