= Dr. Kokastien =

2012 mixtape by Kokane

Mixtape by Kokane
- Released: July 1, 2012
- Genre: West Coast hip hop; G-funk; gangsta rap
- Label: Bud E Boy Entertainment
- Producer: DJ King Assassin

Kokane chronology
The Legend Continues... (2012)	Dr. Kokastien (2012)	The New Frontier (2012)

Professional ratings
Review scores
Source	Rating
AllMusic	3.5/5 stars

Dr. Kokastien is the second mixtape by American recording artist Kokane. It was released on July 1, 2012 via Bud E Boy Entertainment, a follow-up to Kokane's eighth full-length studio album, The Legend Continues. The mixtape was hosted by DJ King Assassin and features guest appearances from Aanisah C. Long, Babee Loc, Cavell, E-40, Gorilla Dog, Infiniti, KM.G, Kurupt, Leezy Soprano, Weazel Loc and Young Geezy. The album peaked at number 101 on the US Billboard 200 albums chart.

== Track listing ==
No.	Title	Length
1.	"Dr. Kokastein Intro"
2.	"Where You Get Your Funk From"
3.	"Bottoms Up"
4.	"Jus Gimme Dat"
5.	"Big Rigga"
6.	"I Got It Made"
7.	"U Hear Me" (featuring Kurupt, Leezy Soprano and Weazel Loc)
8.	"Got It Sewed Up" (featuring E-40 and Young Geezy)
9.	"Cold Blooded"
10.	"Sally"
11.	"Play At Your Own Risk" (featuring Aanisah C. Long and Infiniti)
12.	"Smoked Up All My Weed" (featuring Babee Loc, Cavell and Gorilla Dog)
13.	"Bounce, Rock Skate"
14.	"Doja" (featuring KM.G)

Sample credits

- Track 8 contains elements from "Ripped Open by Metal Explosions" by Galt MacDermot's First Natural Hair Band
- Track 13 contains elements from "Bounce, Rock, Skate, Roll" by Vaughan Mason & Crew

== Chart history ==
Chart (2012)	Peak position
US Billboard 200	101
US Top R&B/Hip-Hop Albums (Billboard)	12
US Top Rap Albums (Billboard)	8
US Independent Albums (Billboard)	19
US Heatseekers Albums (Billboard)	1
