= Angry Samoans (album) =

Studio album by Boo-Yaa T.R.I.B.E.
- Released: May 20, 1997
- Genre: Rap metal
- Length: 44:56
- Label: First Kut
- Producer: Monsta O; Danny Devoux

Boo-Yaa T.R.I.B.E. chronology
| Metally Disturbed (1996) | Angry Samoans (1997) | Mafia Lifestyle (2000) |

Angry Samoans is the fifth studio album by the American hip hop group Boo-Yaa T.R.I.B.E. It was released internationally on May 20, 1997 through the band's own record label, First Kut Organization. Upon release, the group embarked on a tour of Europe to promote the album.

In contrast to the group's early work, which were in line with funk and West Coast hip hop styles of Above the Law, N.W.A, and Kid Frost, the album features a rap metal sound that is entirely reliant on live drums and guitars. The album's lyrical themes include homicide, carjacking, and marijuana use.

== Critical reception ==
Professional ratings
Review scores
| Source | Rating |
|---|---|
| Allmusic | 3/5 stars |
| NME | 4/10 |

Allmusic critic Andy Kellman thought that "the arrangements are rudimentary at times and could've been laid down at any point during the last decade, but they're more than enough to get the Devouxs worked up" Kellman subsequently concluded: "In the ears of most fans of the group, it's all that's truly necessary."

== Track listing ==
1. "No Free Ride (Intro)" — 1:32
2. "Skared for Lyfe" — 3:16
3. "Breakin' Lyfe Sykos" — 4:47
4. "Buried Alive" — 3:59
5. "Full Metal Jack Move" — 3:07
6. "Kill for the Family" — 3:50
7. "Retaliate" — 2:40
8. "Boogie Man" — 3:45
9. "Where U Want It" — 4:05
10. "Bang Bangin'" — 3:27
11. "Mr. Mister Redeyes" — 5:33
12. "Angry Samoans" — 3:00
13. "No Free Ride (Outro)" — 1:56

== Personnel ==
- Boo-Yaa T.R.I.B.E. — performance
- Danny Devoux — production
- Monsta O — production
