= West Koasta Nostra =

Studio album by Boo-Yaa T.R.I.B.E.
- Released: October 7, 2003
- Recorded: 2003
- Studio: Sarinjay Studios; Front Page Studios
- Genre: West Coast hip hop; gangsta rap
- Length: 54:29
- Label: Sarinjay Entertainment
- Producer: Godfather (exec.); Jayson Woy (exec.); DJ Battlecat (also exec.); Eminem

Boo-Yaa T.R.I.B.E. chronology
Mafia Lifestyle (2000)	West Koasta Nostra (2003)	Business as Usual (2006)

West Koasta Nostra is the seventh album by Samoan-American hip hop group Boo-Yaa T.R.I.B.E. It was released in 2003 via Sarinjay Entertainment, the record marked the first successful album for the group since its debut album, New Funky Nation. The album managed to make it to #85 on the Top R&B/Hip-Hop Albums and #42 on the Independent Albums. The album featured two hit singles, "Bang On" featuring Mack 10 and "911" featuring Eminem and B-Real. Other guests include Kurupt, Knoc-Turn'al, WC, Mr. Short Khop, Crooked I and Kokane. B-Real and Sen Dog made a cameo appearance on the album's single "Bang On".

Professional ratings
Review scores
Source	Rating
AllMusic	3/5 stars

== Track listing ==
No.	Title	Length
1.	"Bang On" (featuring Mack 10)	4:32
2.	"On Me" (featuring Kurupt)	4:37
3.	"State of Emergency" (featuring Knoc-Turn'al, Oyster Boy and King Lu)	5:33
4.	"911" (featuring Eminem and B-Real)	4:36
5.	"Zodiak Kreep" (featuring Gail Gotti)	4:38
6.	"Heated" (featuring Mr. Short Khop)	5:21
7.	"Tha Kalling"	4:13
8.	"N Full Motion" (featuring WC)	3:32
9.	"Legends"	3:54
10.	"Carson City" (featuring Fiji)	4:17
11.	"Take Yo Fade" (featuring Kokane, Crooked I and Eastwood)	4:31
12.	"Beautiful Thang" (featuring Baby-Down)	4:45
Total length:		54:29

== Personnel ==
- Ted "Godfather" Devoux - main performer, executive producer
- Paul "Ganxsta Ridd" Devoux - main performer
- Vincent "Gawtti" Devoux - main performer
- Donald "Kobra" Devoux - main performer
- Danny "Monsta O" Devoux - main performer
- Roscoe "Murder One" Devoux - main performer
- Jayson Woy - A&R, art direction, design, executive producer
- Kevin Gilliam - executive producer, producer (tracks 1–3, 5–12)
- Marshall Mathers - featured artist & producer (track 4)
- Dedrick D'Mon Rolison - featured artist (track 1)
- Ricardo Emmanuel Brown - featured artist (track 2)
- Royal Harbor - featured artist (track 3)
- Louis Freese - featured artist (track 4)
- JoVan Brumfield - featured artist (track 5)
- Lionel Hunt - featured artist (track 6)
- William Loshawn Calhoun Jr. - featured artist (track 8)
- George Veikoso - featured artist (track 10)
- Dominick Wickliffe - featured artist (track 11)
- Deshaun Woodard - featured artist (track 11)
- Jerry B. Long Jr. - featured artist (track 11)
- Ian Faith - Executive Producer, A&R
- Tom Baker - mastering
- Phil Roland - engineering
- Davis Factor - cover art
