= Express Yourself Clearly =

Studio album by E.Y.C.
- Released: 1994
- Recorded: 1993
- Genre: Pop; R&B
- Length: 45:50
- Label: MCA

E.Y.C. chronology
Express Yourself Clearly (1994)	Put It On ... E.Y.C. (1995)

Singles from Express Yourself Clearly
- 1. "Get Some (US only)" Released: 1993; 2. "Feelin' Alright" Released: 1993; 3. "The Way You Work It" Released: 1994; 4. "Number One" Released: 1994; 5. "Black Book" Released: 1994; 6. "One More Chance" Released: 1994

Alternative cover
- The US album cover which was completely repackaged to appeal to the US market.

Professional ratings
Review scores
Source	Rating
Music Week	3/5 stars
Select	1/5 medals

Express Yourself Clearly is the debut studio album by American pop and R&B group E.Y.C. It was released in 1994 in Europe, Australia, Japan and the United States. The album charted at No. 14 on the UK Albums Chart.

== Album content ==
The album features the top 40 hits "Feelin' Alright", "The Way You Work It", "Black Book, "Number One" and "One More Chance". The track "Get Some", featuring Boo-Yaa T.R.I.B.E., was E.Y.C.'s debut single in the US before the band had success in Europe with their first international single "Feelin' Alright".

The US version of the album had completely different artwork and a slightly different track listing to cater for the US market, including the track "Straight Mackin'" which replaced "Number One" ("Straight Mackin'" was the B-side to the international single "Number One"). "The Way You Work It" was remixed for the US album.

A limited edition 2-disc version was also released in the UK featuring additional tracks.

== Track listing ==
=== UK version ===
No.	Title	Writer(s)	Length
1.	"Feelin' Alright"	Damon Butler; David Loeffler; Trey Parker; Phillip Gordy; Darric Graham	4:11
2.	"Nice and Slow"	Butler; Loeffler; Parker; Gina 'Go-Go' Gomez; Greg Lawson	4:24
3.	"Black Book"	Butler; Loeffler; Parker; Gordy; Graham	4:08
4.	"Remembering You Girl"	Butler; Loeffler; Parker; Gomez; Nick Mundy; Donnell Spencer Jr.	4:41
5.	"One More Chance"	Howie Rice; Tony LeMans	4:03
6.	"The Way You Work It"	Butler; Loeffler; Parker; Gordy; Graham	2:57
7.	"Baby Don't You Know"	Butler; Loeffler; Parker; Gomez; Lawson	4:53
8.	"Number One"	Butler; Loeffler; Parker; Rice	3:39
9.	"You Are My Happiness"	Rice; Joseph Stonestreet	4:03
10.	"Swing My Way (Demo)"	Butler; Loeffler; Parker; Bronek Wroblewski	4:25
11.	"Get Some" (featuring Boo-Yaa T.R.I.B.E.)	Butler; Loeffler; Parker; Boo-Yaa T.R.I.B.E.	4:22

Additional tracks on 2-disc version

No.	Title	Writer(s)	Length
1.	"Feelin' Alright" (Show Mix)	Butler; Loeffler; Parker; Gordy; Graham	3:21
2.	"The Way You Work It" (T. Reck Mix)	Butler; Loeffler; Parker; Gordy; Graham	4:32
3.	"EYC-Ya"		2:04

=== US version ===
No.	Title	Writer(s)	Length
1.	"Feelin' Alright"	Butler; Loeffler; Parker; Gordy; Graham	4:11
2.	"Nice and Slow"	Butler; Loeffler; Parker; Gomez; Lawson	4:24
3.	"Black Book"	Butler; Loeffler; Parker; Gordy; Graham	4:08
4.	"Remembering You Girl"	Butler; Loeffler; Parker; Gomez; Mundy; Spencer	4:41
5.	"One More Chance"	Rice; LeMans	4:03
6.	"The Way You Work It"	Butler; Loeffler; Parker; Gordy; Graham	2:57
7.	"Baby Don't You Know"	Butler; Loeffler; Parker; Gomez; Lawson	4:53
8.	"Swing My Way"	Butler; Loeffler; Parker; Wroblewski	3:39
9.	"You Are My Happiness"	Rice; Stonestreet	4:03
10.	"Straight Mackin'"	Butler; Loeffler; Parker	4:03
11.	"Get Some" (featuring Boo-Yaa T.R.I.B.E.)	Butler; Loeffler; Parker; Boo-Yaa T.R.I.B.E.	4:22

== Charts ==
Chart (1994)	Peak position
Australian Albums (ARIA Charts)	98
United Kingdom (OCC)	14
