= Da Khop Shop =

Studio album by Mr. Short Khop
- Released: March 20, 2001
- Recorded: 2000–2001
- Studio: Cherokee Studios
- Genre: West Coast hip hop; G-funk; gangsta rap
- Length: 55:03
- Label: Heavyweight; TVT
- Producer: Terry Carter (exec.); Battlecat; Twin; N.O. Joe; Binky; Flossy P; BlaqThoven; Caviar; Overdose; Oz; Chris Lace; DJ Rice

Singles from Da Khop Shop
- 1. "Dollaz, Drank & Dank" Released: 2001

Professional ratings
Review scores
Source	Rating
AllMusic	1.5/5 stars
HipHopDX	3/5
XXL	L (3/5)

Da Khop Shop is the only studio album by American rapper Mr. Short Khop. It was released on March 20, 2001, via Heavyweight Records and TVT Records. Recording sessions took place at Cherokee Studios. It features guest appearances from Ice Cube, Kokane, Kurupt, Mack 10, WC and Shaquille O'Neal among others. The album peaked at No. 154 on the Billboard 200. The single "Dollaz, Drank & Dank" reached No. 2 on Billboard's Hot Rap Singles chart.

== Track listing ==
No.	Title	Producer(s)	Length
1.	"Intro" (Skit)		1:58
2.	"Braveheart"	Twin	2:39
3.	"Short Khop & the Brain" (featuring Ice Cube)	N.O. Joe; Jo Jo^{[a]}	3:44
4.	"Baby Mama (Message #1)" (Skit)		0:18
5.	"Kingpin and da Kockhound (Pass the Pussyy)" (featuring Kurupt)	Twin	4:44
6.	"One Way to Win" (featuring Ice Cube)	N.O. Joe	4:28
7.	"Dey Trippin'" (featuring WC and Problem Chyld)	Battlecat	4:01
8.	"Baby Mama (Message #2)" (Skit)		0:22
9.	"Ya Baby Daddy"	Binky Mack	5:05
10.	"Dollaz, Drank & Dank" (featuring Kokane)	Battlecat	4:33
11.	"2 of 'Em and the Door Locked" (Skit)		1:41
12.	"Flashbacks" (featuring Ice Cube)	Battlecat	4:15
13.	"Da Ready Rock"	Flossy P	4:31
14.	"M.V.P.'s" (featuring Shaquille O'Neal)	BlaqThoven	3:46
15.	"Es Mi Casa" (featuring Kokane)	Caviar; Overdose; Oz	5:18
16.	"My Loved One (Remix)" (featuring Ice Cube)	Chris Lace; DJ Rice	3:40
Total length:			55:03

Notes

- ^{^[a]} signifies a co-producer

== Charts ==
Chart (2001)	Peak position
US Billboard 200	154
US Top R&B/Hip-Hop Albums (Billboard)	34
