= Smash Hits Poll Winners Party =

- Awarded for: Best and Worst in Music, Film & TV
- Country: United Kingdom
- Presented by: Smash Hits
- Formerly called: Smash Hits Readers' Poll (1979–'87); Smash Hits Poll Winners Party (1988–'00); T4 Smash Hits Poll Winners Party (2001–'05)
- First award: 7 February 1979; 47 years ago
- Final award: 20 November 2005; 20 years ago

Television/radio coverage
- Network: BBC1 (1988–2000); Channel 4 (2001–2005)

The Smash Hits Poll Winners Party was a British awards ceremony which ran from 1979 to 1987 as the Smash Hits Readers' Poll, then on television from 1988 to 2005. Each award winner was voted by readers of Smash Hits magazine. It ended with the closure of the magazine in February 2006. The event was initially produced by Harvey Goldsmith and Janet Street-Porter. Tim Byrne also worked on the show. He now works alongside Simon Cowell.

When it moved to television, the awards ceremony was shown on BBC1 from 1988 to 2000 then later on Channel 4 from 2001 to 2005; it was then renamed T4 Smash Hits Poll Winners Party. Past presenters have included Phillip Schofield, Simon Mayo, Andi Peters, Toby Anstis, Lily Savage, Ant and Dec, Will Smith, Melanie Sykes, June Sarpong, Margherita Taylor and Vernon Kay. Past group winners have included Bros, New Kids on the Block, Take That, Spice Girls, Backstreet Boys, Boyzone, Westlife, Busted and Girls Aloud.

The event was notorious for the incident in 1991 involving Phillip Schofield and Carter USM, when the band's performance was cut short, causing them to trash up the stage. Following this, when Schofield made a remark about the band's behaviour, their guitarist Les "Fruitbat" Carter rugby tackled Schofield. The band was temporarily banned from performing on television, but ticket sales for its tour soared. The award itself was seen as a gimmicky object by many outside the magazine's readership, including winners such as rock bands (who only ever won their own genre-based category "Best Rock", although Coldplay were once nominated for Best Band). The trophy was an oversized fake gold disc bearing the magazine's logo, turned slightly by 45 degrees to the left and placed in a black stand.

The ceremony was publicised by Anita Strymowicz for several years. The Smash Hits Poll Winners Party Party, a post-show bash gained almost as much coverage as the event itself with most of the artists and bands attending.

== History ==
Smash Hits started to run its annual Poll Winners Poll in 1980. It involved asking their readers to complete a form that was printed in the magazine. The form detailed, among other things The Best Dressed Person and Favourite Single from the year, and the readers would send them into the Smash Hits offices. The completed forms would then be compiled into a list of the winners and runner-ups and Smash Hits would then print them in the magazine. For the first couple of years, the results were printed in either February or March of the following year. However, in 1982 the results were printed in December of the same year.

In 1988, the poll changed from just being published in the magazine to being a TV event and was renamed the Smash Hits Poll Winners Party. The awards ceremony ran from 1988 to 2005 and was still voted for by the readers of the magazine. The Smash Hits Poll Winners Party ended with the closure of the magazine in 2006. The event was initially produced by concert promoter Harvey Goldsmith and Janet Street-Porter. Steps manager Tim Byrne also worked on the show.

The awards ceremony was shown on BBC1 from 1988 to 2000 then later on Channel 4 from 2001 to 2005; it was then renamed to T4 Smash Hits Poll Winners Party. Past presenters have included Phillip Schofield, Simon Mayo, Andi Peters, Toby Anstis, Lily Savage, Ant and Dec, Will Smith, Melanie Sykes, June Sarpong, and Vernon Kay.

The award itself was seen as a gimmicky object by many outside the magazine readership, including winners such as rock bands. The trophy was an oversized fake gold disc bearing the magazine's logo, turned slightly by 45 degrees to the left placed in a black stand.

== Awards ==
=== Readers' Poll ===
No.	Year	Multiple wins
1st	1979	The Police (3 awards)
2nd	1980	The Police (3 awards)
3rd	1981	Adam Ant (2 awards)
4th	1982	Duran Duran (3 awards)
5th	1983	Duran Duran (3 awards)
6th	1984	Duran Duran (3 awards)
7th	1985	Madonna (5 awards)
8th	1986	Madonna (5 awards)
9th	1987	Michael Jackson (4 awards)

=== Winners Party ===
The Smash Hits Poll Winners Party is an annual awards show that was aired on BBC1 from 1988 to 2000 before moving to Channel 4 in 2001 until its demise in 2005.

No.	Year	TV channe!	Venue	Host(s)	Performers
10th	1988	BBC1	Royal Albert Hall	Phillip Schofield	Yazz; Wet Wet Wet; Climie Fisher; Salt 'N' Pepa; Rick Astley; Jane Wiedlin; Brother Beyond; Bananarama; Bros; The Pasadenas
11th	1989	BBC1	Docklands Arena	Phillip Schofield	Big Fun; Bros; Neneh Cherry; Jason Donovan; Martika; Kylie Minogue
12th	1990	BBC1	Docklands Arena	Phillip Schofield	Jason Donovan; Craig McLachlan; Betty Boo; Monie Love; Snap!; Roxette; The Boys; Vanilla Ice; Deee-Lite
13th	1991	BBC1	Docklands Arena	Phillip Schofield	Marky Mark; Cathy Dennis; Jason Donovan; Dannii Minogue; New Kids on the Block; The Farm; Salt 'N' Pepa; The Osmonds - Second Generation; Kenny Thomas; Carter USM; Extreme
14th	1992	BBC1	Olympia	Simon Mayo; Jordan Knight	Kris Kross; Take That
15th	1993	BBC1	Wembley Arena	Andi Peters; Will Smith	Björk; E.Y.C.; Take That
16th	1994	BBC1	Docklands Arena	Andi Peters; Dean Cain; Gabrielle Reece	Take That; Kylie Minogue; Erasure; Terrorvision; The Brand New Heavies; E.Y.C.; Moist
17th	1995	BBC1	Docklands Arena	Andi Peters; Dani Behr	Björk; MN8; Eternal; Backstreet Boys; Boyzone; Take That; Radiohead
18th	1996	BBC1	Docklands Arena	Ant & Dec; Lily Savage	Spice Girls; Boyzone; Robbie Williams; Manic Street Preachers; Backstreet Boys
19th	1997	BBC1	Docklands Arena	Ant & Dec; Jayne Middlemiss	Spice Girls
20th	1998	BBC1	Docklands Arena	Melanie Sykes; Stephen Gateley	
21st	1999	BBC1	Docklands Arena	Steps	Steps; S Club; Texas; Lou Bega; Westlife; B*Witched; A1, Britney Spears; Vengaboys; Charlotte Church; Martine McCutcheon; Ronan Keating; Cerys Matthews; Tom Jones; Enrique Iglesias; Five; Boyzone
22nd	2000	BBC1	Docklands Arena	Richard Blackwood; Katy Hill; Louise Redknapp	Steps; Sonique; Samantha Mumba; Ronan Keating; Kylie Minogue; Savage Garden; Billie Piper; All Saints; S Club; Texas; Richard Blackwood; A1, Westlife; Five; Madison Avenue
