= Just Add Water (Suga Free album) =

Studio album by Suga Free
- Released: May 9, 2006
- Recorded: 2005–2006
- Genre: West Coast hip hop; gangsta rap; G-funk
- Length: 1:17:47
- Label: Laneway; Bungalo
- Producer: Blaqthoven; Daisuke "DAIS" Miyachi; Freeze; J Classic; Josef Leimberg; J. Steez; Kenny McCloud; Mannie Fresh; Poochie Ross; SACCS

Suga Free chronology
The New Testament (The Truth) (2004)	Just Add Water (2006)	Sunday School (2007)

Professional ratings
Review scores
Source	Rating
AllMusic	4/5 stars
PopMatters	9/10
RapReviews	8.5/10

Just Add Water is the third studio album by American rapper Suga Free. It was released on May 9, 2006 through Laneway/Bungalo Records. Production was handled by Ricky "Freeze" Smith, J. Classic, Big Saccs, Kenny McCloud, Blaqthoven, Poochie Ross, Josef Leimberg, J. Steez, Daisuke Miyachi and Mannie Fresh. It features guest appearances from Blaqthoven, Katt Williams, Infra-Red, Snoop Dogg, Asami Yoshida, Cody Elles, Debra Edwards, Jeff Jeff, Klu Dogg, Knoc-turn'al, Kokane, Lil' ½ Dead, Marlon, Mike Mike, Mr. Short Khop and Strange. It peaked at number 194 on the US Billboard 200 and at number 42 on the Top R&B/Hip-Hop Albums.

== Critical reception ==
Quentin B. Huff of PopMatters praised the album, writing that "its humor and musicianship represent the best of the West Coast while taking an expansive approach to making music that goes beyond its genre". The Chicago Tribune called the album "a fascinating, always entertaining, and even enlightening piece of work".

== Track listing ==
No.	Title	Producer(s)	Length
1.	"Intro" (featuring Katt Williams)	Freeze	1:27
2.	"What U Want" (featuring Strange)	Freeze	3:53
3.	"Tune the Fuckin (Skit)"		0:04
4.	"Like What"	J. Classic; Freeze (co.)	4:17
5.	"Put Ya Hands Up"	Poochie Ross	3:47
6.	"U Know My Name"	Freeze	3:55
7.	"Free-Call Snoop (Skit)"		0:39
8.	"So Fly" (featuring Snoop Dogg and Katt Williams)	Freeze	4:17
9.	"The Ranger"	Freeze; Torrell Ruffin (co.)	3:31
10.	"New and Improved (Skit)"		0:10
11.	"Peace of Mind" (featuring Cody Elles and Debra Edwards)	Freeze; Torrell Ruffin (co.)	3:32
12.	"U Ain't Knowin'" (featuring Knoc-Turn'al)	Kenny McCloud	3:42
13.	"Suga Cane" (featuring Kokane)	Kenny McCloud	4:32
14.	"Fox Is Comin (Skit)"		0:07
15.	"If You Feel Me (DAIS West Coast Mix)" (featuring Asami Yoshida)	Daisuke "DAIS" Miyachi	3:33
16.	"How I Get Down" (featuring Infra-Red, Jeff Jeff and Mike Mike)	SACCS; Bumpus (co.)	3:42
17.	"I'm Gone" (featuring Lil' ½ Dead)	Josef Leimberg; Freeze (co.)	3:53
18.	"Person 2 Person" (featuring Blaqthoven and Klu Dogg)	Freeze	3:53
19.	"Don't Worry"	J. Steez; Freeze (co.)	3:45
20.	"Short Khop Interlude" (featuring Mr. Short Khop)	J. Classic	1:26
21.	"Where U From" (featuring Infra-Red)	J. Classic; Freeze (co.)	3:44
22.	"Happy" (featuring Marlon)	SACCS; Bumpus (co.)	4:16
23.	"Change" (featuring Blaqthoven)	Blaqthoven	3:24
24.	"Boyfriend Pimpin'" (featuring Blaqthoven)	Freeze	3:54
25.	"So Fly" (Remix) (featuring Snoop Dogg, Katt Williams and Mannie Fresh)	Mannie Fresh	4:25
Total length:			1:17:47

== Charts ==
Chart (2006)	Peak position
US Billboard 200	194
US Top R&B/Hip-Hop Albums (Billboard)	42
US Top Rap Albums (Billboard)	22
