= They Call Me Mr. Kane =

Studio album by Kokane
- Released: November 16, 1999
- Genres: West Coast hip hop; gangsta rap
- Length: 50:00
- Label: Eureka
- Producers: Laness Daniel (exec.); Battlecat; DJ Silk

Kokane chronology
Funk Upon a Rhyme (1994)	They Call Me Mr. Kane (1999)	Mr. Kane, Pt. 2 (2004)

They Call Me Mr. Kane is the third studio album by American rapper Kokane. It was released on November 16, 1999, via Eureka Records. The record featured guest appearances from Bad Azz, Big Tray Deee, C-Bo, Mr. Short Khop, Spice 1, Too $hort, Pomona City Rydaz, and Natural Disasters. Audio production of the album was handled by DJ Battlecat and DJ Silk.

== Track listing ==
No.	Title	Length
1.	"1999" (featuring Mr. Short Khop)	3:59
2.	"Section 11350" (featuring Spice 1)	4:59
3.	"Breakout" (featuring Tray Dee)	3:57
4.	"Major Papers"	4:14
5.	"Monster Humps" (featuring Natural Disasters)	6:54
6.	"Rhyme Slow" (featuring Too $hort)	5:04
7.	"That's My Momma" (featuring Bad Azz)	4:50
8.	"Sprinkle With Game" (featuring Pomona City Rydaz)	5:01
9.	"On the Grind"	5:12
10.	"Mob" (featuring C-Bo)	6:07
Total length:		50:00

Sample credits

- "Sprinkle With Game" contains elements from "Can I" by One Way (1982)

== Personnel ==
- Jerry B. Long Jr. - main artist
- Kevin Gilliam - producer (tracks 1–2, 8–10)
- Russell Brown - producer (tracks 3–7)
- Laness Daniel - mixing, executive producer
- Robert Vosgien - mastering
- Lionel Hunt - featured artist (track 1)
- Precious Raquel King - featured artist (track 1)
- Robert Lee Green Jr. - featured artist (track 2)
- Tracy Lamar Davis - featured artist (track 3)
- Todd Anthony Shaw - featured artist (track 6)
- Jamarr Antonio Stamps - featured artist (track 7)
- Shawn “Cowboy” Thomas - featured artist (track 10)
- Natural Disasters - featured artists (track 5)
- Pomona City Rydaz - featured artists (track 8)
