= E.Y.C. (band) =

American pop/R&B band

- Trey Parker, David Loeffler, Damon Butler

Background information
- Origin: United States
- Genres: Pop, R&B
- Years active: 1992–1999
- Labels: Sony Music (1990–1996), MCA, Red Ant Recordings (1999)
- Past members: Damon Butler; Dave Loeffler; Trey Parker

E.Y.C. (also known as Express Yourself Clearly) was an American pop/R&B group. Its members were Damon Butler, Dave Loeffler and Trey Parker.

== History ==
E.Y.C. formed to find success in their home country, but became more popular in the United Kingdom and Australia. As the band were forming, Parker was playing Kid Blink in the Disney movie Newsies. Parker and Butler first met as backing dancers on New Kids on the Block's Hangin' Tough Tour. At the 1993 Smash Hits Poll Winners Party, the trio were the first group to win the Best Roadshow Act award; the award would launch the careers of Boyzone, Backstreet Boys and many more in the following years. The band also toured with Whitney Houston during The Bodyguard World Tour and Prince.

They scored six top 40 hits in the UK Singles Chart before disbanding. Their first single, "Feelin' Alright", sold over 60,000 copies in the UK and peaked at number 16 on the UK Singles Chart. E.Y.C.'s debut album, Express Yourself Clearly, peaked at number 14 on the UK Albums Chart.

The band sold over 500,000 records outside the US. In Australia, the band also won an ARIA Award for Best New International Act. They also starred in a Dr Pepper commercial in the US.

On World AIDS Day 1994, the band also performed in front of Princess Diana and George Michael at London's Wembley Arena for the Concert of Hope, a concert held by The Royal Trust of The Princess of Wales to benefit AIDS charities.

They also appeared on the Childliners single "The Gift of Christmas", alongside acts such as Backstreet Boys, Boyzone, MN8, Sean Maguire, Deuce, Ultimate Kaos, Let Loose, East 17, Peter Andre, Michelle Gayle, and Dannii Minogue.

After a short break, the band got back together and signed an independent deal with Red Ant Records, after which they released the US-only album I Feel It and the singles "This Thing Called Love" and "Only a Dream". The band performed on Nickelodeon's All That Music & More Festivals and support slots on the Backstreet Boys' Into the Millennium Tour, with appearances on Donny & Marie as part of the release.

Since E.Y.C. disbanded, Parker has been touring with LA Allstars, while Butler has performed as Limp Wristed. Parker and Butler also co-wrote Anastacia's 2002 single "Why'd You Lie to Me". Loeffler went into music management and has worked with various acts, such as Lionel Richie and Why Don't We.

== Discography ==
=== Albums ===
- 1994: Express Yourself Clearly – UK #14, AUS #96
- 1995: EYC Ya! (Japan only)
- 1995: EYC Ya! – The Express Remixes (Asian only release)
- 1996: Put It On
- 1999: I Feel It (US only release)

=== Singles ===
Year	Single	Peak chart positions			Certifications	Album
Year	Single	AUS	UK	US Dance	Certifications	Album
1993	"Get Some" (with Boo-Yaa T.R.I.B.E.)	—	—	—		Express Yourself Clearly
1993	"Feelin' Alright"	7	16	—	AUS: Gold	Express Yourself Clearly
1994	"The Way You Work It"	41	14	—		Express Yourself Clearly
1994	"Number One"	—	27	—		Express Yourself Clearly
1994	"Black Book"	25	13	21		Express Yourself Clearly
1994	"One More Chance"	—	25	—		Express Yourself Clearly
1995	"Ooh-Ah-Aa (I Feel It)"	—	33	—		Put It On
1995	"In the Beginning"	—	41	—		Put It On
1999	"This Thing Called Love"	—	—	—		I Feel It
1999	"Only a Dream"	—	—	—		I Feel It
