= The New Testament (The Truth) =

Studio album by Suga Free
- Released: March 2, 2004
- Recorded: 2002–2003
- Genre: Hip hop
- Length: 55:07
- Label: Bungalo; Universal
- Producer: DJ Quik; Fastlane; Frank Nitty; Hi-C; Big SACCS; DJ Koki; Freeze; Lil' Saccs

Suga Free chronology
Street Gospel (1997)	The New Testament (The Truth) (2004)	Just Add Water (2006)

Professional ratings
Review scores
Source	Rating
RapReviews	8.5/10

The New Testament (The Truth) is the second studio album by American rapper Suga Free. It was released on March 2, 2004, via Bungalo/Universal Records. Production was handled by DJ Quik, Big Saccs, Fastlane, Frank Nitty, Hi-C and DJ Koki. It features guest appearances from Cash Flow, Bigg Steele, Chingy, Hi-C and Kokane. It peaked at number 72 on the US Billboard 200 and at number 23 on the Top R&B/Hip-Hop Albums.

== Track listing ==
No.	Title	Producer(s)	Length
1.	"Interlude 1"	DJ Quik	1:35
2.	"Why U Bullshittin', Pt. 2"	DJ Quik	3:21
3.	"Thinkin'"	DJ Quik	3:33
4.	"He's Pimpin' She's Hoein'" (featuring Cash Flow)	Fastlane	3:22
5.	"Angry Enuff"	DJ Quik	3:26
6.	"Born Again"	DJ Quik	3:25
7.	"You Just Won't Stop Talkin'"	Hi-C	4:29
8.	"Get Loose" (featuring Bigg Steele)	SACCS; Lil' Saccs (co.)	3:44
9.	"Did I Do Dat" (featuring Cash Flow)	Frank Nitty	4:05
10.	"Don't Fight da Pimpin'"	DJ Quik	3:18
11.	"High Heels" (featuring Kokane)	SACCS	4:05
12.	"Pay Me" (featuring Hi-C)	SACCS; DJ Koki	3:13
13.	"Yo Momma Yo Daddy"	DJ Quik	3:32
14.	"Get What She Pay Foe"	DJ Quik; Freeze (co.)	3:57
15.	"Circus Music" (featuring Chingy)	DJ Quik	4:22
16.	"Outro"	DJ Quik	1:40
Total length:			55:07

No.	Title	Length
17.	"First Home Video 1992"	27:05

== Charts ==
Chart (2004)	Peak position
US Billboard 200	72
US Top R&B/Hip-Hop Albums (Billboard)	23
