= If U Stay Ready =

Single by Suga Free featuring Playa Hamm

from the album Street Gospel
- Released: 1997
- Recorded: 1996
- Genre: Hip hop
- Length: 4:47
- Label: Polygram
- Songwriter(s): David Blake, Dejuan Walker, Playa Hamm
- Producer(s): DJ Quik, Robert "Fonksta" Bacon, G-One

Suga Free singles chronology
| "If U Stay Ready" (1997) | "On My Way" (1997) |

Playa Hamm singles chronology
| "If U Stay Ready" (1997) |

"If U Stay Ready" is the first single released from Suga Free's first studio album, Street Gospel. It features Playa Hamm and is produced by DJ Quik, Robert "Fonksta" Bacon and G-One. The song was used on the How to Be a Player soundtrack.

== Track listing ==
Vinyl, 12", promo

1. "On My Way (Clean)" (featuring El DeBarge) - 4:29
2. "On My Way (Instrumental)" - 4:27
3. "I'd Rather Give You My Bitch" - 5:04
4. "If U Stay Ready (DJ Quik Remix)" - 5:03
5. "Why You Bullshittin'" - 4:25
6. "Tip Toe (LP Version)" (featuring DJ Quik) - 5:16

CD single

1. "If U Stay Ready (Clean Radio Edit)" - 4:25
2. "If U Stay Ready (LP Version)" - 4:45
3. "If U Stay Ready (TV Version)" - 4:24
4. "Fly Fo Life (LP Version)" - 4:46

== Chart performance ==
| Chart (1997) | Peak position |
|---|---|
| US Billboard Hot 100 | 79 |
| US Billboard Hot R&B/Hip-Hop Songs | 39 |
| US Billboard Rap Songs | 9 |
