= Addictive Hip Hop Muzick =

Studio album by Who Am I?
- Released: July 2, 1991
- Recorded: 1991
- Studio: The Edge Recording Studio (Inglewood, California)
- Genre: West Coast hip-hop; gangsta rap
- Length: 57:53
- Label: Ruthless; Epic
- Producer: Eazy-E (exec.); Laylaw (also exec.); Above the Law

Kokane chronology
Addictive Hip Hop Muzick (1991)	Funk Upon a Rhyme (1994)

Singles from Addictive Hip Hop Muzick
- 1. "Nickel Slick Nigga" Released: 1991

Professional ratings
Review scores
Source	Rating
AllMusic	2/5 stars
RapReviews	7/10 stars

Addictive Hip Hop Muzick is the debut studio album by American recording artist Kokane, and the only one released under his 'Who Am I?' alias. It was released on July 2, 1991 through Ruthless Records and Epic Records. Recording sessions took place at the Edge Recording Studio in Inglewood, California. Production was handled by Cold 187um and fellow Above the Law members with executive production by Lay Law and Eazy-E. It was mixed by Dr. Dre and Cold 187um at Audio Achievements in Torrance, California. The album features contributions from DJ Total K-oss, Funkette, Go Mack, KM.G, Lay Law, Lillian, Mz Kilo and Tha New Funkateers on vocals, Cold 187 um on vocals and keyboards, Stan "The Guitar Man" Jones on bass and guitar.

== Track listing ==
No.	Title	Length
1.	"Would You Die 4 Me?"	1:11
2.	"Action"	4:55
3.	"Inner City Hoodlum" (featuring Cold 187um)	4:57
4.	"Nickel Slick Nigga"	4:50
5.	"Meditation"	1:51
6.	"Dope Sound Boy"	4:42
7.	"Keep the Flavor"	4:38
8.	"Brain on Kane"	1:36
9.	"Just a Fiend"	4:48
10.	"Pure Kane Nigga"	4:55
11.	"B.O.P. (Big Old Pimp)"	1:21
12.	"Pimp Mentality"	5:50
13.	"Cocaine Business"	5:13
14.	"U.S.C.'s Finest" (featuring Laylaw, Mz Kilo, Cold 187um and KM.G)	7:14
Total length:		57:53

Sample credits

- "Would U Die 4 Me" sampled "After the Dance (Instrumental)" by Marvin Gaye (1976)
- "Action" sampled "Mission: Impossible Theme" by Lalo Schifrin (1967), "Funky Drummer" by James Brown (1970), "Feel Good" by Fancy (1974) and "No More ?'s" by Eazy-E (1988)
- "Inner City Hoodlum" sampled "Flow On" by Above the Law (1990)
- "Nickel Slick Nigga" sampled "Impeach the President" by The Honey Drippers (1973)
- "Meditation" sampled "Gangster Boogie" by Chicago Gangsters (1975) and "N.T." by Kool & the Gang (1971)
- "Dope Sound Boy" sampled "Back to Life (Acapella)" by Soul II Soul (1989) and "105 BPM Dopejam" by Simon Harris (1989)
- "Keep The Flavor" sampled "The Champ" by The Mohawks (1968), "Jungle Boogie" by Kool & the Gang (1973) and "Dazz" by Brick (1976)
- "Brain On Kane" sampled "Illegal Business" by Boogie Down Productions (1988), "Sa Prize (Part 2)" by N.W.A (1990) and "Sing a Simple Song" by Sly & the Family Stone (1968)
- "Pure Kane Nigga" sampled "Kool Is Back" by Funk, Inc. (1971) and "Cramp Your Style" by All the People & Robert Moore (1972)
- "B.O.P. (Big Old Pimp)" sampled "Freddie's Dead" by Curtis Mayfield (1972)
- "Pimp Mentality" sampled "Gangsta Gangsta" by N.W.A (1988)
- "Cocaine Business" sampled "Ironside" by Quincy Jones (1971), "Funky President (People It's Bad)" by James Brown (1974), ""T" Plays It Cool" by Marvin Gaye (1972) and "UFO" by ESG (1981)
- "U.S.C.'s Finest" sampled "Ashley's Roachclip" by The Soul Searchers (1974) and "Gangsta Gangsta" by N.W.A (1988)

== Personnel ==
- Jerry Buddy Long, Jr. – lead vocals
- Gregory Fernan Hutchinson – vocals, keyboards, producer, mixing
- Larry Goodman – vocals, co-producer, executive producer
- Kevin Michael Gulley – vocals, co-producer
- Anthony Stewart – vocals, co-producer
- Arthur Lee Goodman III – vocals, co-producer
- Rachelle Thomas – vocals
- David Dyson – additional vocals
- Stan "The Guitar Man" Jones – bass, guitar
- Mark "The Don" Paladino – engineering
- Donovan Smith – engineering
- Andre Young – mixing
- Eric Wright – executive producer
