= Back 2 tha Clap =

Studio album by Kokane
- Released: July 18, 2006
- Recorded: 2006
- Genre: West Coast hip hop; G-funk
- Length: 52:16
- Label: SMC Recordings
- Producer: Monte "Mont Rock" Malone (exec.); Fingazz

Kokane chronology
Mr. Kane, Pt. 2 (2005)	Back 2 tha Clap (2006)	Pain Killer'z (2006)

Back 2 tha Clap is the fifth solo studio album by American rapper Kokane. It was released on July 18, 2006 via SMC Recordings. Audio production of the entire record was handled by Fingazz. It featured guest appearances from Kurupt, Roscoe, Pro, KM.G, 40 Glocc, Down, and R.Ill.

== Track listing ==
1. Intro
2. Back 2 Tha Clap
3. The Streets are Callin' (featuring Kurupt & Roscoe)
4. Straight Coats
5. Sucka Sandwiches
6. Gangsta'd Up (featuring Pro & 40 Glocc)
7. If It's All the Same (featuring KM.G)
8. #1 Baby Boo (featuring Fingazz)
9. Hard Timin'
10. Lil' Homies
11. Bienvenidos a California (featuring Down)
12. The Monkey Was Funky
13. Can't Funk-Shun (featuring Sheldon Fisher on guitar)
14. When It Rains It Pours (featuring Down & R.III)

== Personnel ==
- Jerry B. Long, Jr. – main artist
- Down a.k.a. Kilo – featured artist (tracks 11, 14)
- David Brown – featured artist (track 3)
- Ricardo Brown – featured artist (track 3)
- Lawrence White – featured artist (track 6)
- Pro – featured artist (track 6)
- Kevin Michael Gulley – featured artist (track 7)
- John Stary – featured artist (track 8), producer
- Monte "Mont Rock" Malone – executive producer
- Marc Rustigian – mastering
- Sheldon Fisher – guitar (track 13)
- Oscar Varela – cover art
