= Gimme All Mine =

Studio album by Kokane
- Released: 2010
- Genre: Hip hop
- Length: 49:36
- Labels: Bud E Boy Entertainment; Bonzi Records
- Producers: Rob Racks (exec.); Erik "Mr. E" Ramos (also exec.); Kokane (also exec.); West Coast Stone; Vitamin D; Tha Chill; Adam "Swerve" Trujillo

Kokane chronology
| Pain Killer'z (2006) | Gimme All Mine (2010) | The Legend Continues... (2011) |

Professional ratings
Review scores
| Source | Rating |
|---|---|
| HipHopDX | 3/5 |
| RapReviews | 7.5/10 |

Gimme All Mine is the seventh solo studio album by American recording artist Kokane. It was released in 2010 via Bud E. Boy Entertainment and Bonzi Records. Production was handled by West Coast Stone, Vitamin D, Tha Chill, Adam "Swerve" Trujillo and Kokane himself. It features guest appearances from Above The Law, Eternal and West Coast Stone.

== Track listing ==
| No. | Title | Writer(s) | Producer(s) | Length |
|---|---|---|---|---|
| 1. | "Twilight Zone" | Jerry B. Long | Tha Chill | 4:20 |
| 2. | "Killin Fields" (featuring Bokie Loc and Cynthia Patterson) | Long | Tha Chill | 3:41 |
| 3. | "Baptized in tha Funk" | Long | West Coast Stone | 4:18 |
| 4. | "Gimme All Mine" | Long | Kokane; Erik "Mr. E" Ramos (co.) | 3:49 |
| 5. | "Made a Difference" | Long | Vitamin D | 4:28 |
| 6. | "Lay You Down" (featuring Above The Law) | Long; Gregory Hutchinson; Kevin Gulley | Vitamin D | 5:04 |
| 7. | "Can a Thug Get to Heaven" | Long | West Coast Stone | 3:57 |
| 8. | "Rollin' Up on Hoez" | Long | Adam "Swerve" Trujillo | 3:52 |
| 9. | "Gettin' Ova" (featuring Eternal) | Long; J Golden | | 3:30 |
| 10. | "Jelly Jar" (featuring West Coast Stone) | Long; West Coast Stone | West Coast Stone | 4:46 |
| 11. | "Travel the World" | Long | Vitamin D | 3:43 |
| 12. | "Sleepin in My Bed" | Long | West Coast Stone | 4:08 |
| Total length: | | | | 49:36 |

== Personnel ==
- Jerry Buddy Long Jr. – vocals, background vocals (track 2), producer (track 4), executive producer
- Andre "Bokie" Edwards – background vocals (track 2)
- Cynthia Patterson – background vocals (track 2)
- Gregory "Cold 187um" Hutchinson – vocals (track 6)
- Kevin "KM.G" Gulley – vocals (track 6)
- Eternal – vocals (track 9)
- WestCoast Stone – vocals (track 10), producer (tracks: 3, 7, 10, 12)
- Vernon "Tha Chill" Johnson – producer & mixing (tracks: 1, 2)
- Derrick "Vitamin D" Brown – producer (tracks: 5, 6, 11)
- Adam "Swerve" Trujillo – producer (track 8)
- Erik "Mr. E" Ramos – co-producer (track 4), recording, mixing (tracks: 3–12), executive producer
- Ken Lee – mastering
- Rob Racks – executive producer
- Jon "J. Wells" Henderson – co-executive producer
- 3rd Eye Dezine – artwork, photography
