= DJ King Assassin =

American rapper

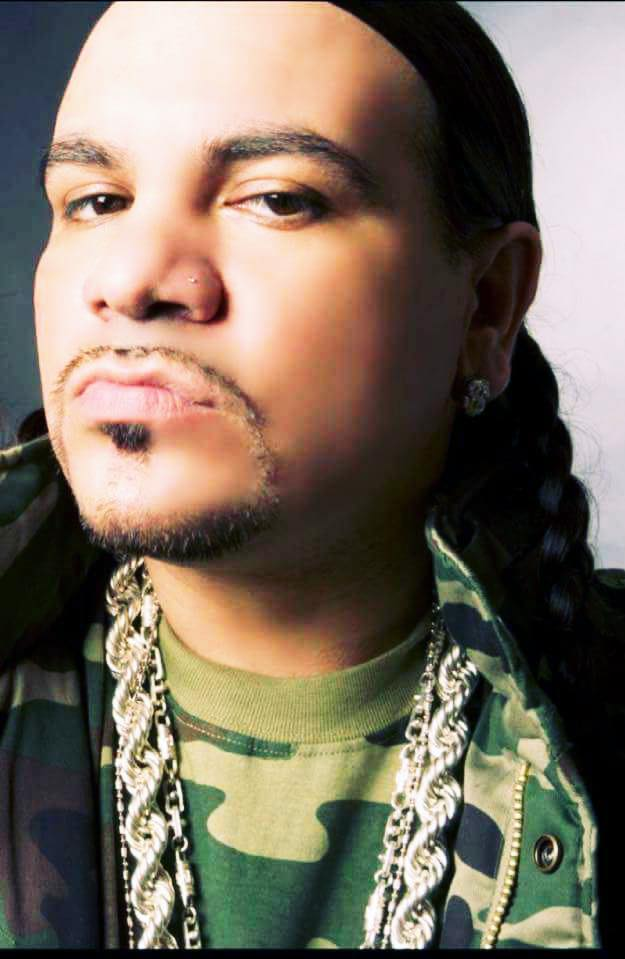
- Born: Craig S. Venegas Alvarado; January 15, 1971 (age 55); Los Angeles, California, U.S.
- Other names: DJ Raleem; Assassin
- Occupations: DJ; producer; radio personality; director
- Years active: 1989 - Present
- Musical career
- Genres: Hip hop; G-funk
- Instruments: Turntables; sampler
- Labels: VIP Music; Def Jam
- Website: Official website

Craig Venegas Alvarado (born January 15, 1971), known by his stage name DJ King Assassin, is an American disc jockey, producer, and engineer from Los Angeles, California.

Venegas became influential in the west coast hip-hop music scene after having helped pioneer records for 1990s era rap moguls such as 2Pac, Ice-T and Eazy-E.

Venegas started producing at an early age, growing up in the California Bay Area. Starting in the 1980s, Venegas influenced the west coast hip-hop music culture by creating sounds for rappers in the Bay Area & L.A California. He connected with former Ruthless Records rapper Kokane and charted on billboard with Dr Kokastien and The Legend Continues.

Throughout his career, Venegas engineered over 300 titles for recording artists signed to Universal Records, EMI, Def Jam, including several of which reached the Billboard charts, respectively. In 2014, he peaked at #7 on the Billboard charts in the US following the release of a mixtape with fellow industry partner Kokane. For several consecutive years, Venegas has been awarded DJ of the Year for his lengthy music contribution in the West Coast Hip Hop Awards.

== Early life ==
Venegas spent most of his early life in California traveling from San Jose, Vallejo, East Palo Alto and Sacramento, where he then relocated back to his native California lifestyle in the city of Los Angeles. As a kid, he won his school's spelling bee at Hillsdale Elementary and later went on to the district of Franklin Mckinley's spelling bee. He also learned to play drums in elementary school, and in eighth grade, how to make music. From that time, he became interested in music as well as breakdancing, in which he won trophies at local fairs and contests throughout the state of California.

Venegas' influences include long-time friend and collaborator 2Pac and Eazy-E, as he has grown up in California.

== Musical career ==
=== 1990s-2000s: career beginnings ===
Venegas moved where originally his parents are from, in Southern California, and began his career as a record disc jockey, in which he later produced for recording artists signed to Russell Simmons record label Def Jam. In the early part of his career, Venegas produced for several projects from Eazy-E at Kitchen Sync and Echo Sound studios. It was there where, Venegas, a rising producer, teamed up with Tupac Shakur in which he later established a close relationship with the West Coast rapper.

While Tupac Shakur worked on "Me Against The World", Venegas has claimed he began producing music with Shakur, later witnessing the creation and contributing scratching to the original version of "Dear Mama", one of Shakur's most successful hip-hop records, these claims have however been questioned as he misidentified the producer who worked on the original as being Tony Pizarro, Pizarro was brought in a year after the initial recording to revamp the song for release and had no involvement in the actual recording session or the version with scratching Venegas claimed to have contributed to. Venegas, thereafter, produced, mixed and mastered an inordinate number of records for hip-hop recording artists in the west coast of the US, influencing the unique funk sound established by rappers like Eazy-E and 2Pac.

=== 2010-2015: The King Assassin Show & Mixtapes ===
Venegas started his own internet syndicated radio show, The King Assassin Show, which featured appearances from recording artists and other notable figures like Freeway Rick Ross, for example. Throughout the first half of the 2010s, Venegas released numerous mixtapes, some of which featured unreleased music from Tupac Shakur, and others in collaboration with west coast rappers.

=== 2016—present: original Dear Mama Recording & Makaveli Film ===
In May 2016, following the passing of Afeni Shakur, Tupac Shakur's birth mother, Venegas was featured on TMZ and Billboard magazine where he spoke on his affiliation and relationship with the Shakur estate and the release of the original version of Tupac Shakur's classic record "Dear Mama". In 2016, Venegas announced he will be producing and directing a film loosely based on Tupac Shakur's personal life and music career. The film is expected to be shot in California, and acting cast has not been released yet.

In 2016, following the passing of Tupac Shakur's mother, Alvarado released a rare recording of 'Dear Mama' in honor of her death, which was later picked up by numerous music news outlets including TMZ, XXL and Complex. The version Alvarado "released" was however sourced from a bootlegg which had been posted to hiphop forums as far back as 2007 and uploaded to Youtube shortly after.

=== Guinness book of world records ===
Assassin holds the Guinness Book Of World Records for recording the longest hip-hop song in the history followed by Rappers Delight entitled State Of Emergency which features mostly platinum and legendary artists and to be released in 2020.

== List of albums, with selected chart positions and sales figures ==
Title	Billboard Charting History	Peak chart positions	
Title	Billboard Charting History	Spotify + Web	Heatseekers
Dr. Kokastien Hosted By Dj King Assassin]	Billboard Charts Number 1: Released: August 11, 2012; Label: Bud E Boy Entertainment; Formats: digital download	1	1
DJ King Assassin	Billboard & Spotify: Released: April 12, 2014; Label: Liferdef Records; Formats: digital download	7	--

== List of entire singles and albums Discography ==
Year	Title	Note
12inch singles
1990	Lyrical Prophecy - You can't swing this	Featured and Production as DJ Raleem
1990	Charizma And Peanut Butter Wolf; Circa 1990 -1993	Featured Adlibs
1992	Cisco The Frisco Mc - Audi 5000	Featured and Production
1992	Various What A Remix; Assassin Bring The Drums	Featured and Production
1998	17 Reasons Various Cisco - Take Me Higher	Featured and Production
1993	Ghetto Politics - Ghetto Life E.P	Featured and Production
1995	Juvenile Style - The Cavi	Production
1996	Assassin Featuring Tupac - Real Bad Boyz	Featured and Production
2002	Assassin - Out Of Custody E.P	Solo Album and Production
Cassette		
1994	Various Strictly For The Streets; A Compilation about the game	Official LP Features and Production
1994	Assassin - Hitworks Original Cassette release	Official LP Features and Production
1996	Assassin - Hitworks	Official LP Features and Production
1997	Assassin - Born And Raised In The Bay	Official LP Features and Production
1998	Assassin - Armed N Dangerouz	Official LP Features and Production
1999	Assassin - Worldwide Game	Official LP Features and Production
1999	Assassin - Soldierz At War	Official LP Features and Production
Compact disk		Official LP Features and Production
1994	Assassin & Tupac's Thuglife - Strictly For The Streets; A Compilation about the game	Official LP Features and Production
1996	Assassin - Hitworks	Official LP Features and Production
1997	Assassin - Born And Raised In The Bay	Official LP Features and Production
1998	Assassin - Armed N Dangerouz	Official LP Features and Production
1999	Assassin - Worldwide Game	Official LP Features and Production
1999	Assassin - Soldierz At War	Official LP Features and Production
1999	Assassin - City Of Dope	Official LP Features and Production
2000	Assassin - Revelation 2000	Official LP Features and Production
2001	Assassin - Anthology	Official LP Features and Production
2002	Assassin - Out Of Custody	Official LP Features and Production
2003	Assassin - Hitman For Hire	Official LP Features and Production
2004	Assassin - JT The Bigga Figga; Fillmoe 2 San Jo	Official LP Features and Production
2006	Assassin - San Quinn - Fillmoe 2 San Jo 2	Official LP Features and Production
2007	Assassin - Mopreme Shakur; Black And Brown Pride	Official LP Features and Production
2008	Assassin - United Playaz Of The Bay	Official LP Features and Production
2008	Assassin - High-Fee Movement	Official LP Features and Production
2011	Assassin - West Turf Compilation Kings	Official LP Features and Production
Mixtapes
2005: Tupac: The Way He Wanted It Vol. 1; 2006: Tupac: The Way He Wanted It Vol. 2; 2007: Tupac: The Way He Wanted It Vol. 3; 2007: Lil' Prophet & W.G.G. Presents: 2pac: World Wide Mob Figga; 2008: Tupac: The Way He Wanted It Vol. 4; 2009: Tupac: The Way He Wanted It Vol. 5; 2009: Dj King Assassin Presents: Mr. Loco & D.L.E.M.M.A.: 4 Tha Thugz & Guttar Folk; 2009: Dj King Assassin Presents: Lokixximo : Enigma Mixtape (Dominican Republic); 2012: Dj King Assassin Presents Pro Reck (D.O.P.E) (Mixtape Album); 2012: Dj King Assassin Presents - Kelo - Gramzzterdam (Mixtape Album); 2012: Dj King Assassin Presents: Slick F.B : New Era (Mixtape Album); 2015: Dj King Assassin Presents: What Would Pac Do ft Kokane, Joe Young, Cold 187 um & 2pac (Single); 2015: Dj King Assassin presents: Kay Nine Tha Boss : "Cruise Control Road 2 Success". (Album); 2016: Lil' Prophet & W.G.G. Presents: 2pac: 20 Years Gone Mixtape (Hosted by DJ 4Five of DPG & DJ King Assassin; 2016: Dj King Assassin Presents: O.G Rome Dogg (Rowdoggs) Grindmode Volume 2; 2016: Dame Grease & King Assassin : "My Style" Feat. Sheek, Pusha T & Freeway Hip Hop DX Exclusive (Single); 2017: Dj King Assassin Presents: Bugzy Bluntz : Momma Tried (Single); 2018: Dj King Assassin Presents: T$P (Tha Survivalist) : Tales From A Cell (Album)

== Filmography ==
=== Television & Major Motion Pictures ===
Title	Year	Role	Other notes
The King Assassin Show	2014	Host	Starring Role
Savoy Films Scenes For The Soul Directors: George Tillman Jr. Robert Teitel	1995	Soundtrack Featuring Tupac Shakur Real Bad Boys	Joshua Dreams Films Producer Soundtrack
Oprah Winfrey Show	2015	Special Guest	Live television
TMZ Live	2016	Special Guest	Live television

=== Radio ===
Title	Year	Role	Other notes
The King Assassin Show	2014	Host	Web syndicated
98.2 The Beat	2016	DJ	Web syndicated
