= Street Gospel =

Studio album by Suga Free
- Released: June 24, 1997
- Recorded: 1997
- Genre: West Coast hip hop; g-funk
- Length: 57:44
- Label: Island Black Music
- Producer: DJ Quik; G-One; Robert "Fonksta" Bacon

Suga Free chronology
Street Gospel (1997)	The Konnectid Project, Vol. 1 (2000)

Singles from Street Gospel
- 1. "If U Stay Ready" Released: April 22, 1997

Professional ratings
Review scores
Source	Rating
AllMusic	4/5 stars
The Source	2.5/5 stars

Street Gospel is the debut solo album by the American West Coast hip hop artist Suga Free. It was released on June 24, 1997, via Island Black Music. Production was entirely handled by DJ Quik, who recruited his frequent collaborators Robert "Fonksta" Bacon and G-One. It features guest appearance from DJ Quik, Playa Hamm and Hi-C. The album was recorded in 28 days. The album was also released in a clean version, which is out of print. It peaked at No. 37 on the Billboard Top R&B/Hip-Hop Albums and No. 14 on the Heatseekers Albums in the United States. In 2025, Pitchfork placed Street Gospel at number 84 on their list of the 100 Best Rap Albums of All Time.

== Track listing ==
No.	Title	Writer(s)	Producer(s)	Length
1.	"Intro"	Dejuan Walker	DJ Quik	0:48
2.	"Why U Bullshittin?"	Walker; David Blake	DJ Quik	4:25
3.	"I'd Rather Give You My Bitch"	Walker; Blake	DJ Quik	5:04
4.	"Doe Doe and a Skunk"	Walker; Blake; Carl McIntosh; Jane Eugene; Steve Nichol; Nick Martinelli	DJ Quik	5:08
5.	"Don't No Suckaz Live Here"	Walker; Blake; Wilbert B. Milo	DJ Quik; Robert "Fonksta" Bacon; G-1	5:13
6.	"Tip Toe" (featuring DJ Quik)	Walker; Blake; Crawford Wilkerson	DJ Quik	5:16
7.	"I Wanna Go Home (The County Jail Song)"	Walker	DJ Quik	3:43
8.	"If U Stay Ready"	Walker; Blake; Milo; Robert Bacon	DJ Quik; Robert "Fonksta" Bacon; G-1	4:47
9.	"Fly Fo Life"	Walker; Blake	DJ Quik	4:48
10.	"On My Way"	Walker; Blake	DJ Quik	4:29
11.	"Secrets"	Walker; Blake	DJ Quik	4:43
12.	"Table Interlude"	Walker	DJ Quik	1:06
13.	"Dip Da"	Walker; Blake	DJ Quik; Robert "Fonksta" Bacon; G-1	4:32
14.	"Tip Toe (Reprise)"	Walker; Blake; Wilkerson	DJ Quik	3:42
Total length:				57:44

== Charts ==
Chart (1997)	Peak position
US Top R&B/Hip-Hop Albums (Billboard)	37
US Heatseekers Albums (Billboard)	14
