= Funk Upon a Rhyme =

Studio album by Kokane
- Released: April 12, 1994
- Recorded: 1993–1994
- Studio: The Edge Studio (Los Angeles, CA); Echo Sound (Los Angeles, CA)
- Genre: West Coast hip hop; gangsta rap; G-funk; experimental hip hop
- Length: 1:09:18
- Label: Ruthless
- Producer: Eazy-E (exec.); Cold 187um

Kokane chronology
Addictive Hip Hop Muzick (1991)	Funk Upon a Rhyme (1994)	They Call Me Mr. Kane (1999)

Singles from Funk Upon a Rhyme
- 1. "Slow Burnin' 22.5° Fahrenheit" Released: 1994; 2. "Bakin' Soda Free" Released: 1994

Professional ratings
Review scores
Source	Rating
AllMusic	2.5/5 stars
Entertainment Weekly	B−

Funk Upon a Rhyme is the sophomore studio album by American rapper and singer Kokane. It was released in 1994 through Ruthless Records with distribution by Relativity Records. Recording sessions took place at the Edge Studio and Echo Sound in Los Angeles, California. Production was handled by Cold 187um with executive production by Eazy-E. The album features contributions from Janine, Nicki and Tha New Funkateers on background vocals, Cold 187um on keyboards and vocals, Mike Smooth on guitar and keyboards, Mike "Crazy Neck" Sims on guitar, with guest appearances from Dirty Red, Tha Alkaholiks, Black Hole Of Watts, and Above The Law.

Previously, the rapper debuted with Addictive Hip Hop Muzick under the name 'Who Am I?', making this full-length his first one recording as 'Kokane' and his second release overall. Funk Upon a Rhyme peaked at number 56 on the Top R&B/Hip-Hop Albums chart and at number 19 on the Heatseekers Albums chart in the United States. The album is now out of print and very rare.

The album spawned two singles: "Slow Burnin' 22.5° Fahrenheit" and "Bakin' Soda Free". Its last song, "Don't Bite the Phunk", is a diss track towards Dr. Dre, Snoop Doggy Dogg, Tha Dogg Pound & Death Row.

== Track listing ==
No.	Title	Length
1.	"Ridin' on the Funk"	4:03
2.	"From the Funk to the Back"	5:04
3.	"Mo' Water"	4:37
4.	"Slow Burnin' 22.5° Fahrenheit"	4:26
5.	"I Need Representation"	4:45
6.	"My Day is Coming"	4:40
7.	"All Bark No Bite" (featuring Tha Alkaholiks)	5:22
8.	"Bakin' Soda Free"	4:19
9.	"Aftermath" (featuring Above The Law & Dirty Red)	5:15
10.	"No Pain No Gain"	4:47
11.	"Funkinmuffin"	5:27
12.	"Shots Out"	2:26
13.	"Shit, Goddamm" (featuring Black Hole Of Watts)	4:37
14.	"Don't Bite the Phunk" (featuring Cold 187um)	8:44
Total length:		1:09:18

Note

- Some versions have 15 tracks because the intro isn't a part of the first track.

Sample credits

- "Ridin' on the Funk" contains elements from "I'll Write A Song For You" by Earth, Wind & Fire (1977)
- "From the Funk to the Back" contains elements from "Anniversary" by Tony! Toni! Toné! (1993) and "Give Up The Funk (Tear The Roof Off The Sucker)" by Parliament (1976)
- "Mo' Water" contains elements from "Flex" by Mad Cobra (1992), "Nasty Girl" by Vanity 6 (1982), "Give It Away" by Red Hot Chili Peppers (1991)
- "Slow Burnin' 22.5° Fahrenheit" contains elements from "Ninety-Nine And A Half (Won't Do)" by Wilson Pickett (1966)
- "My Day is Coming" contains elements from "Metal Flake Mind" by Mtume (1978) and "Impeach the President" by The Honey Drippers (1973)
- "All Bark No Bite" contains elements from "Person To Person" by Average White Band (1974)
- "Bakin' Soda Free" contains elements from "Bring The Noise" by Public Enemy (1987)
- "Aftermath" contains elements from "Fuck Wit Dre Day" by Dr. Dre & Snoop Dogg (1992), "Down 2 Tha Last Roach" by Eazy-E & B.G. Knocc Out (1993) and Cop Shootout from The Terminator (1984)
- "No Pain No Gain" contains elements from "Munchies For Your Love" by Bootsy Collins (1977) and "Devotion" by Earth, Wind & Fire (1974)
- "Shit, Goddamm" contains elements from "Sweet Sticky Thing" by Ohio Players (1975) and "Get Off Your Ass And Jam" by Funkadelic (1975)

== Personnel ==
- Jerry Buddy Long Jr. – main artist, lead vocals
- Gregory Fernan Hutchinson – featured artist (tracks: 9, 14), keyboards, producer, mixing
- James Robinson – featured artist (track 7)
- Rico Smith – featured artist (track 7)
- Kevyn "Shaki" Carter – featured artist (track 9)
- Anthony Stewart – featured artist (track 9)
- Kevin Michael Gulley – featured artist (track 9)
- Andrew "D-Nut" Simpson – featured artist (track 13)
- Antyone "Big Twon" Reed – featured artist (track 13)
- Orie G. "Big O" Windfield – featured artist (track 13)
- Shante "Young Down" Henderson – featured artist (track 13)
- Janine – additional vocals (track 1)
- Nicki – additional vocals (track 5)
- Tha New Funkateers – backing vocals (track 10)
- Mike Smooth – guitar, keyboards
- Mike "Crazy Neck" Sims – additional guitar (track 4)
- Mark "The Don" Paladino – mixing (tracks: 1, 3–12, 14)
- Mike Calderon – mixing (tracks: 2, 13)
- Brian Gardner – mastering
- Eric Wright – executive producer
- Julie Dennis – photography

== Chart history ==
Chart (1994)	Peak position
US Top R&B/Hip-Hop Albums (Billboard)	56
US Heatseekers Albums (Billboard)	19
