= The Legend Continues (album) =

2012 album by Kokane

The Legend Continues...

Studio album by Kokane
- Released: 2012
- Genre: Gangsta rap; soul
- Length: 41:29
- Label: Bud E Boy Entertainment
- Producer: Kokane (also exec.); Big Squeeze; J. Wells; Tha Chill; West Coast Stone; David "DWizzey" Williams

Kokane chronology
Gimme All Mine (2010)	The Legend Continues... (2012)	Shut da F Up & Cut da Checc (2014)

The Legend Continues... is the eighth solo studio album by American recording artist Kokane. It was released in 2012 through Bud E Boy Entertainment with distribution by Cycadelic Records. Production was handled by Kokane himself along with Squeeze, Tha Chill, West Coast Stone, David Williams and J. Wells. The album features guest appearances from KM.G of Above The Law, Caviar and C-Bo.

The album reached number 196 on the US Billboard 200 albums chart, making it Kokane's the most successful studio album to date (along with Dr. Kokastien mixtape).

== Track listing ==
No.	Title	Producer(s)	Length
1.	"Intro"	Big Squeeze; Kokane	1:37
2.	"Locs & Dogs" (featuring C-Bo & Caviar)	Tha Chill	4:48
3.	"Dosher" (featuring KM.G)	Big Squeeze; Kokane	3:34
4.	"W3st Side Pomona"	West Coast Stone	3:56
5.	"The Legend Continues"	David Williams	4:06
6.	"Inspiration 4 Elevation"	Big Squeeze; Kokane	3:15
7.	"Paper Trail"	Big Squeeze	3:28
8.	"My World"	J. Wells	3:03
9.	"Jus 2 Feed My Family"	Big Squeeze; Kokane	4:04
10.	"Where I Come From"	Big Squeeze; Kokane	3:21
11.	"Streets is Loving Me"	Big Squeeze	2:44
12.	"OG Kokane"	Big Squeeze	3:33
Total length:			41:29

Sample credits

- Track "Where I Come From" contains elements from "Angel Dust" by Gil Scott-Heron and Brian Jackson

== Personnel ==
- Jerry Buddy Long Jr. – main artist, producer (tracks: 1, 3, 6, 9, 10), executive producer
- Shawn “Cowboy” Thomas – featured artist (track 2)
- Kannon "Caviar" Cross – featured artist (track 2)
- Kevin Michael Gulley – featured artist (track 3)
- Big Squeeze – producer (tracks: 1, 3, 6, 7, 9–12), mixing
- Vernon Johnson – producer (track 2)
- WestCoast Stone – producer (track 4)
- David "DWizzey" Williams – producer (track 5)
- Jon Henderson – producer (track 8)
- Erik "Mr. E" Ramos – mixing

== Chart history ==
Chart (2012)	Peak position
US Billboard 200	196
US Top R&B/Hip-Hop Albums (Billboard)	25
US Top Rap Albums (Billboard)	22
US Independent Albums (Billboard)	35
US Heatseekers Albums (Billboard)	5
