= Boo-Yaa T.R.I.B.E. =

American hip hop band

- Origin: Carson, California, United States
- Genres: G-funk; West Coast hip-hop; rap metal
- Years active: 1989–present
- Labels: 4th & B'way/Island, Samoan Mafia, Hollywood BASIC
- Members: Vincent "Gawtti" Devoux; Donald "Kobra" Devoux; Roscoe "Murder One" Devoux; David "E.K.A." Devoux
- Past members: Ted "Godfather" Devoux (deceased); Paul "Ganxsta Ridd" Devoux (deceased); Danny "Monsta O" Devoux (deceased)

Boo-Yaa T.R.I.B.E. is an American hip-hop band from Carson, California, consisting of the American Samoan brothers Paul (died 2020), Ted (died 2018), Donald, Roscoe, Danny (died 2022), David and Vincent Devoux. They are known for combining funk and metal influences, with gangsta rap lyricism.

Boo-Yaa T.R.I.B.E. became popular after touring in Japan in the mid-1980s, where they were initially known as the "Blue City Crew." The "Boo-Yaa" in their name signifies the sound of a shotgun being discharged, while the "T.R.I.B.E." stands for "Too Rough International Boo-Yaa Empire." According to hip-hop documentarians, Boo-Yaa T.R.I.B.E. is "synonymous with hip hop in Los Angeles."

== Background ==
The brothers got their start through professional dance then later found their way into making the music to which they enjoyed dancing. In 2000 David Devoux left and was replaced by Vincent Devoux aka Gawtti. When Donald and Vincent were young, they were in an episode of Fame. After beginning to play together as a funk band, they formed the dance crew the Blue City Strutters and publicly danced to funk music, particularly in their South Bay neighborhood. All members are former members or members of West Side Piru and Samoan Warrior Bounty Hunters. Despite their religious upbringing, the brothers eventually fell into the gang scene popular in their home of Carson, California. After their youngest brother was killed in a gang-related shooting in 1987, they decided to turn their lives around and dedicate their lives to music because "that's what he would have wanted."

== Career ==
To get away from the gang culture, the brothers decided to leave Los Angeles and go to Japan. While there, they were inspired to begin performing music again, with Paul "Ganxsta Ridd" rapping in front of eager Japanese audiences. They toured Japan in the mid-1980s and became popular. Upon their return to California in 1988, the group focused again on making music and re-christened themselves as the Boo-Yaa T.R.I.B.E.

Their debut album, New Funky Nation, was different from most rap records at the time because the Boo-Yaa T.R.I.B.E. played live instruments on it.

Boo-Yaa T.R.I.B.E. appeared on the Judgment Night soundtrack performing "Another Body Murdered" with Faith No More, on Kid Frost's East Side Story LP, on The Transplants' Haunted Cities LP and on the rock group P.O.D.'s Testify, with the track "On the Grind." The group also had moderate success with their 1989 single release, "R.A.I.D.". In 1993 they appeared on E.Y.C.'s track 'Get Some' which was released as a single in the U.S. and appeared on their debut album Express Yourself Clearly internationally.

Ted Devoux, a.k.a. The Godfather, died on April 29, 2018, at age 55. Paul Devoux, a.k.a. Ganxsta Ridd, died on December 4, 2020, at the age of 52 due to renal failure. Danny Devoux, a.k.a. Monsta O, died on October 12, 2022, at the age of 56.

== Style and influences ==
The four brothers began their musical careers on a small scale performing instrumentals at their father's A.O.G. "Assembly of God" church. While on their own, they would practice funk hits from the American band Parliament-Funkadelic. When the church was unoccupied, the brothers would experiment with other forms of hip hop.

Boo-Yaa T.R.I.B.E.'s lyrics have been categorized as gangsta rap. They draw from themes which include homicide, carjacking, and marijuana use.

The Boo-Yaa T.R.I.B.E. has also proven to be influential for other Samoan hip hop artists. Kosmo, an important Samoan hip-hop artist in New Zealand, cites the Boo-Yaa T.R.I.B.E. as "an original inspiration for his lifelong interest in street dance and...hip hop music." Additionally, as Samoans are often seen as a diasporic group spread out among various locations, the Boo-Yaa T.R.I.B.E. have been successfully able to reconcile their roles as Samoans and Americans while still traveling and achieving success in Japan and other countries. The group's 1997 album, Angry Samoans, hints at the connection to their Samoan heritage, as they are often identified with the California hip hop scene.

== Discography ==
=== Albums ===
Album Information
New Funky Nation
- Released: April 10, 1990
- Chart Positions: No. 117 US, No. 33 R&B/Hip-Hop
- Last RIAA certification:
- Singles: "Psyko Funk"
Doomsday
- Released: 1994
- Chart Positions:
- Last RIAA certification:
- Singles: "Doomsday", "Kill 'Em All", "Get Gatted On"
Occupation Hazardous
- Released: November 7, 1995
- Chart Positions:
- Last RIAA certification:
- Singles:
Metally Disturbed
- Released: June 4, 1996
- Chart Positions:N/A
- Last RIAA certification:
- Singles: "Metally Disturbed"
Angry Samoans
- Released: 1997
- Chart Positions:
- Last RIAA certification:
- Singles: "Skared for Lyfe", "Buried Alive", "Boogie Man"
Mafia Lifestyle
- Released: October 31, 2000
- Chart Positions: N/A
- Last RIAA certification:
- Singles: "Mafia Lifestyle", "All Mighty Boo-Yaa"
West Koasta Nostra
- Released: October 7, 2003
- Chart Positions: No. 85 Top R&B/Hip-Hop
- Last RIAA certification:
- Singles: "Bang On", "911", "State of Emergency"
Business As Usual
- Released: November 13, 2006
- Chart Positions:
- Last RIAA certification:
- Singles: "G's from the Otha Side", "If I Die, Let Me Roll"

=== Singles ===
| Year | Single | Peak chart positions | | | | Album |
| Year | Single | US R&B HipHop | NZ | NED | UK | Album |
|---|---|---|---|---|---|---|
| 1988 | "Coming Hard To America" | — | — | — | — | single only |
| 1989 | "R.A.I.D." | — | 18 | — | 93 | New Funky Nation |
| 1990 | "Psyko Funk" | 93 | — | 43 | 43 | New Funky Nation |
| 1990 | "Walk The Line" (US only) | — | — | — | — | New Funky Nation |
| 1992 | "Rumors Of A Dead Man" (US only) | — | — | — | — | South Central OST |
| 1993 | "Get Some" (with E.Y.C.) | — | — | — | — | Express Yourself Clearly |
| 1993 | "Another Body Murdered" (with Faith No More) | — | 41 | — | 26 | Judgment Night OST |
| 1994 | "Get Gatted On" | — | — | — | — | Doomsday |
| 1994 | "Death Row California" | — | — | — | — | Doomsday |
| 1997 | "Skared For Lyfe" | — | — | — | — | Angry Samoans |
| 2003 | "Bang On" | — | — | — | — | West Koasta Nostra |
"—" denotes releases that did not chart or were not released.
