= Ice Cube discography =

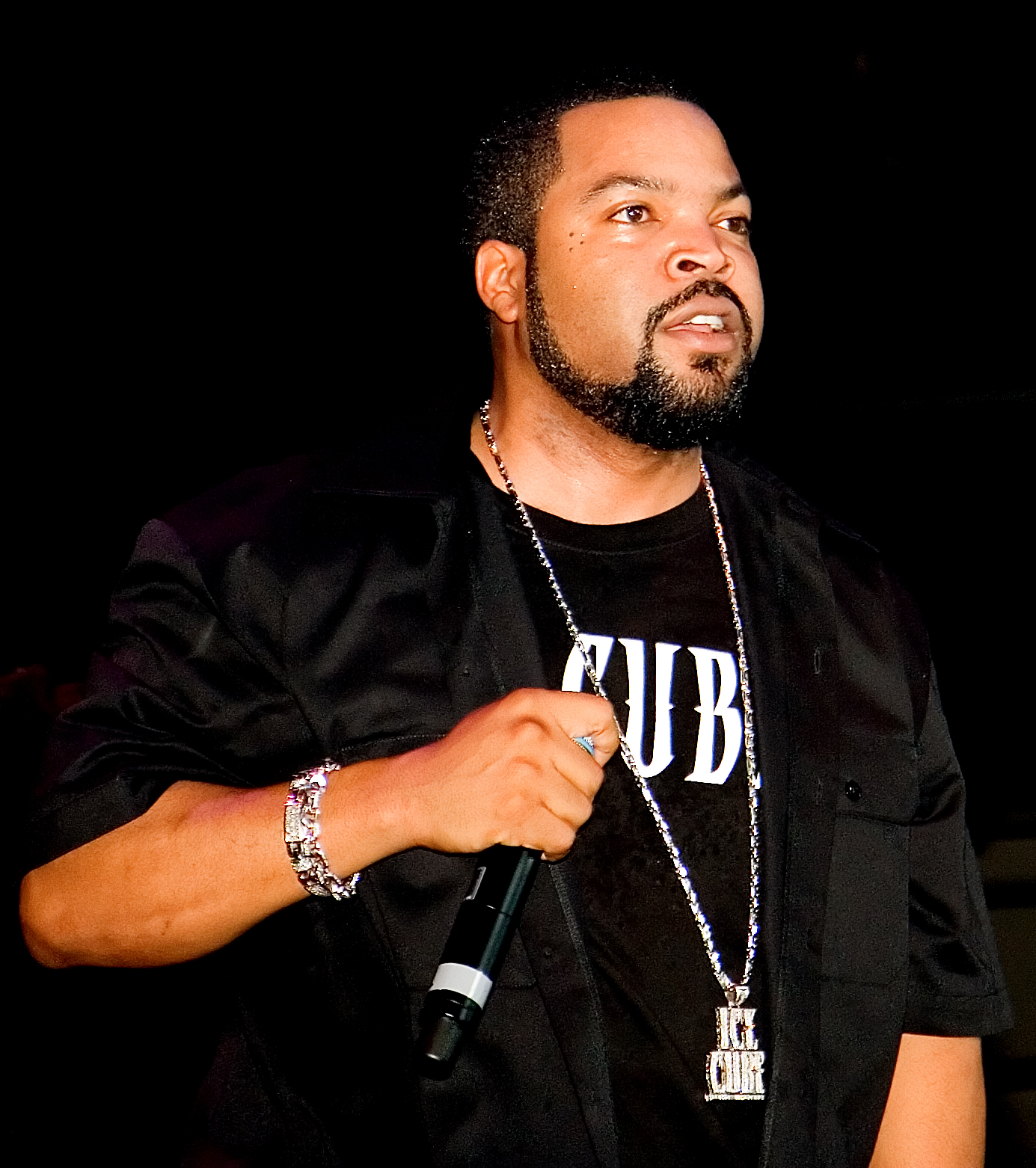
- Cube performing in Toronto in 2006
- Studio albums: 12
- Extended plays: 1
- Soundtrack albums: 12
- Compilation albums: 6
- Singles: 29
- Music videos: 42

The discography of Ice Cube, an American rapper, consists of twelve studio albums, six compilation albums, one extended play, as well as twelve movie soundtracks.

== Albums ==
=== Studio albums ===
List of studio albums, with selected chart positions, sales figures and certifications
Title	Album details	Peak chart positions										Sales	Certifications
Title	Album details	US	US R&B	AUS	BEL	CAN	FRA	NLD	NZL	SWI	UK	Sales	Certifications
AmeriKKKa's Most Wanted	Released: May 16, 1990; Label: Priority; Format: CD, LP, cassette, digital download	19	6	49	—	—	—	—	—	—	48		RIAA: Platinum; BPI: Silver
Death Certificate	Released: October 29, 1991; Label: Lench Mob, Priority; Format: CD, LP, cassette, digital download	2	1	141	—	—	—	—	—	—	—	US: 2,000,000	RIAA: Platinum
The Predator	Released: November 17, 1992; Label: Lench Mob, Priority; Format: CD, LP, cassette, digital download	1	1	72	—	61	—	56	—	—	73	US: 2,200,000	RIAA: 2× Platinum; BPI: Silver; RMNZ: Gold
Lethal Injection	Released: December 7, 1993; Label: Lench Mob, Priority; Format: CD, LP, cassette, digital download	5	1	49	—	34	—	89	—	—	52		RIAA: Platinum
War & Peace, Vol. 1 (The War Disc)	Released: November 17, 1998; Label: Lench Mob, Priority; Format: CD, LP, cassette, digital download	7	2	68	—	13	—	—	—	—	141		RIAA: Platinum; MC: Gold
War & Peace, Vol. 2 (The Peace Disc)	Released: March 21, 2000; Label: Lench Mob, Priority; Format: CD, LP, cassette, digital download	3	1	24	—	7	—	42	—	—	56		RIAA: Gold; BPI: Silver; MC: Gold
Laugh Now, Cry Later	Released: June 6, 2006; Label: Lench Mob; Format: CD, digital download	4	2	46	—	9	129	—	33	63	152	US: 547,000	RIAA: Gold; MC: Gold
Raw Footage	Released: August 19, 2008; Label: Lench Mob; Format: CD, digital download	5	1	58	96	14	—	—	—	53	—		
I Am the West	Released: September 28, 2010; Label: Lench Mob; Format: CD, digital download	22	7	67	—	51	200	—	—	—	—		
Everythang's Corrupt	Released: December 7, 2018; Label: Lench Mob, Interscope; Format: CD, LP, digital download	62	27	56	127	39	—	85	—	63	—		
Man Down	Released: November 22, 2024; Label: Lench Mob, Hitmaker; Format: CD, LP, digital download	48	12	—	—	—	—	—	—	—	—		
Man Up	Released: September 12, 2025; Label: Lench Mob, Hitmaker; Format: CD, LP, digital download	—	—	—	—	—	—	—	—	—	—		
"—" denotes a recording that did not chart or was not released in that territory.

=== Collaborative albums ===
List of collaborative albums, with selected chart positions and certifications
Title	Album details	Peak chart positions			Certifications
Title	Album details	US	US R&B	US Rap	Certifications
Straight Outta Compton (with N.W.A)	Released: August 8, 1988; Label: Ruthless, Priority; Format: CD, digital download	37	9	—	RIAA: 3× Platinum
Bow Down (with Westside Connection)	Released: October 22, 1996; Label: Lench Mob, Priority; Format: CD, digital download	2	1	—	RIAA: Platinum
Terrorist Threats (with Westside Connection)	Released: December 9, 2003; Label: Hoo-Bangin', Capitol; Format: CD, digital download	16	3	—	RIAA: Gold
Snoop Cube 40 $hort (with Mount Westmore)	Released: December 9, 2022; Label: MNRK; Format: CD, digital download	188	—	—	

=== Compilation albums ===
List of compilation albums, with selected chart positions and certifications
Title	Album details	Peak chart positions					Certifications
Title	Album details	US	US R&B	AUS	NZL	UK	Certifications
Bootlegs & B-Sides	Released: November 22, 1994; Label: Lench Mob, Priority; Format: CD, LP, cassette	19	3	77	—	108	RIAA: Gold
Featuring...Ice Cube	Released: December 16, 1997; Label: Priority; Format: CD, cassette	116	32	—	—	—	
Greatest Hits	Released: December 4, 2001; Label: Priority; Format: CD, LP, cassette	54	11	41	6	105	RIAA: Gold; BPI: Gold
In the Movies	Released: September 4, 2007; Label: Priority; Format: CD	169	34	—	—	—	
The Essentials	Released: September 16, 2008; Label: Priority; Format: CD	195	50	—	—	—	
Icon	Released: October 8, 2013; Label: Priority; Format: CD	—	—	—	—	—	
"—" denotes a recording that did not chart or was not released in that territory.

=== Soundtrack albums ===
List of soundtrack albums, with selected chart positions and certifications
Title	Album details	Peak chart positions		Certifications
Title	Album details	US	US R&B	Certifications
Boyz n the Hood (with various artists)	Released: July 9, 1991; Label: Warner Bros.; Format: CD, digital download	12	1	RIAA: Gold
Murder Was the Case (with various artists)	Released: October 15, 1994; Label: Death Row, Interscope; Format: CD, digital download	1	1	RIAA: 2× Platinum; MC: Gold
Friday (with various artists)	Released: April 11, 1995; Label: Priority, EMI; Format: CD, digital download	1	1	RIAA: 2× Platinum
Dangerous Ground (with various artists)	Released: February 11, 1997; Label: Jive; Format: CD, digital download	20	3	
Steel (with various artists)	Released: July 29, 1997; Label: Warner Bros.; Format: CD, digital download	185	26	
The Players Club (with various artists)	Released: March 17, 1998; Label: Heavyweights, A&M; Format: CD, digital download	10	2	RIAA: Platinum
I Got the Hook-Up (with various artists)	Released: April 7, 1998; Label: No Limit; Format: CD, digital download	3	1	RIAA: Platinum
Next Friday (with various artists)	Released: December 7, 1999; Label: Priority; Format: CD, digital download	19	5	RIAA: Gold
Barbershop (with various artists)	Released: August 27, 2002; Label: Epic; Format: CD, digital download	29	9	
Friday After Next (with various artists)	Released: November 19, 2002; Label: Hollywood; Format: CD, digital download	—	—	
xXx: State of the Union (with various artists)	Released: April 26, 2005; Label: Jive; Format: CD, digital download	117	48	
Barbershop: The Next Cut (with various artists)	Released: April 8, 2016; Label: Atlantic; Format: CD, digital download	—	—	

== Extended plays ==
List of extended plays, with selected chart positions and certifications
Title	EP details	Peak chart positions			Certifications
Title	EP details	US	US R&B	UK	Certifications
Kill at Will	Released: December 18, 1990; Label: Priority; Format: CD, LP, cassette, digital download	34	5	66	RIAA: Platinum

== Singles ==
List of singles, with selected chart positions and certifications, showing year released and album name
Title	Year	Peak chart positions						Certifications	Album
Title	Year	US	US R&B	US Rap	AUS	NZL	UK	Certifications	Album
"Who's the Mack?"	1990	—	—	—	—	—	—		AmeriKKKa's Most Wanted
"AmeriKKKa's Most Wanted"	1990	—	—	1	—	—	76		AmeriKKKa's Most Wanted
"Endangered Species (Tales from the Darkside) (Remix)" (featuring Chuck D)	1991	—	—	—	—	—	—		Kill at Will
"Steady Mobbin"	1991	—	30	3	147	—	—		Death Certificate
"True to the Game"	1992	—	109	—	—	—	—		Death Certificate
"Wicked"	1992	55	47	—	—	—	62	RIAA: Gold	The Predator
"It Was a Good Day"	1993	15	7	1	111	—	27	RIAA: Gold; BPI: Platinum; RMNZ: 4× Platinum	The Predator
"Check Yo Self" (featuring Das EFX)	1993	20	1	1	80	38	36	RIAA: Platinum; BPI: Silver; RMNZ: Platinum	The Predator
"Really Doe"	1993	55	30	3	59	—	66		Lethal Injection
"You Know How We Do It"	1994	30	21	5	102	—	41	BPI: Gold; RMNZ: 2× Platinum	Lethal Injection
"Bop Gun (One Nation)" (featuring George Clinton)	1994	23	37	6	93	—	22	RIAA: Gold	Lethal Injection
"Natural Born Killaz" (with Dr. Dre)	1994	—	—	—	—	—	45		Murder Was the Case (soundtrack)
"What Can I Do?"	1995	—	44	—	—	—	—		Bootlegs & B-Sides
"Friday"	1995	—	71	—	—	—	—		Friday (soundtrack)
"The World Is Mine"	1997	—	55	39	—	—	60		Dangerous Ground (soundtrack)
"Men of Steel" (with Shaquille O'Neal, B-Real, Peter Gunz and KRS-One)	1997	82	53	10	—	—	—		Steel (soundtrack)
"We Be Clubbin'"	1998	—	11	—	—	22	—		The Players Club (soundtrack)
"Pushin' Weight" (featuring Mr. Short Khop)	1998	26	12	1	—	—	—	RIAA: Gold	War & Peace, Vol. 1 (The War Disc)
"Fuck Dying" (featuring Korn)	1999	—	—	—	—	—	—		War & Peace, Vol. 1 (The War Disc)
"You Can Do It" (featuring Mack 10 and Ms. Toi)	1999	35	14	—	—	—	2	BPI: Gold; RMNZ: Platinum	Next Friday (soundtrack) / War & Peace, Vol. 2 (The Peace Disc)
"Hello" (featuring Dr. Dre and MC Ren)	2000	—	50	—	—	—	—	RMNZ: Gold	War & Peace, Vol. 2 (The Peace Disc)
"Until We Rich" (featuring Krayzie Bone)	2000	—	50	—	—	—	—	RMNZ: Gold	War & Peace, Vol. 2 (The Peace Disc)
"$100 Bill Y'all"	2001	—	67	—	—	—	—		Greatest Hits
"In the Late Night Hour" (featuring Pusha T)	2001	—	—	—	—	—	—		Greatest Hits
"Chrome & Paint" (featuring WC)	2006	—	—	—	—	—	—		Laugh Now, Cry Later
"Why We Thugs"	2006	92	110	—	—	—	—	RMNZ: Platinum	Laugh Now, Cry Later
"Go to Church" (featuring Snoop Dogg and Lil Jon)	2006	121	67	25	—	—	—		Laugh Now, Cry Later
"Steal the Show"	2006	—	—	—	—	—	—		Laugh Now, Cry Later
"Gangsta Rap Made Me Do It"	2008	—	—	—	—	—	—		Raw Footage
"Do Ya Thang"	2008	115	111	—	—	—	—		Raw Footage
"Why Me?" (featuring Musiq Soulchild)	2008	—	—	—	—	—	—		Raw Footage
"I Rep That West"	2010	—	—	—	—	—	—		I Am the West
"Drink the Kool-Aid"	2010	—	—	—	—	—	—		I Am the West
"She Couldn't Make It on Her Own" (featuring Doughboy and OMG)	2010	—	—	—	—	—	—		I Am the West
"Everythang's Corrupt"	2013	—	—	—	—	—	—		Everythang's Corrupt
"Crowded"	2013	—	—	—	—	—	—		Non-album singles
"The Big Show"	2013	—	—	—	—	—	—		Non-album singles
"Sasquatch"	2013	—	—	—	—	—	—		Non-album singles
"Sic Them Youngins On 'Em"	2014	—	—	—	—	—	—		Non-album singles
"Drop Girl" (featuring Redfoo and 2 Chainz)	2014	—	—	—	156	—	—		Non-album singles
"Real People" (with Common)	2016	—	—	—	—	—	—		Barbershop: The Next Cut (Soundtrack)
"Good Cop, Bad Cop"	2017	—	—	—	—	—	—		Everythang's Corrupt
"Arrest the President"	2018	—	—	—	—	—	—		Everythang's Corrupt
"That New Funkadelic"	2018	—	—	—	—	—	—		Everythang's Corrupt
"Trying to Maintain"	2021	—	—	—	—	—	—		Death Certificate (Complete Edition)
"It's My Ego"	2024	—	—	—	—	— (Note: "It's My Ego" did not enter the NZ Top 40 Singles Chart, but peaked at number 18 on the NZ Hot Singles Chart.)	—		Man Down
"Ego Maniacs" (featuring Killer Mike and Busta Rhymes)	2024	—	—	—	—	—	—		Man Down
"So Sensitive"	2024	—	—	—	—	—	—		Man Down
"Before Hip Hop"	2025	—	—	—	—	—	—		Man Up
"—" denotes a recording that did not chart or was not released in that territory.

== Guest appearances ==
List of non-single guest appearances, with other performing artists, showing year released and album name
Title	Year	Other performer(s)	Album
"Still Talkin'"	1988	Eazy-E, The D.O.C.	Eazy-Duz-It
"No More ?'s"	1988	Eazy-E	Eazy-Duz-It
"The Grand Finale"	1989	The D.O.C., MC Ren, Eazy-E, Dr. Dre	No One Can Do It Better
"Burn Hollywood Burn"	1990	Public Enemy, Big Daddy Kane	Fear of a Black Planet
"Ain't Nuthin' but a Word to Me"	1990	Too $hort	Short Dog's in the House
"Played Like a Piano"	1990	King Tee	At Your Own Risk
"How to Survive in South Central"	1991	—N/a	Boyz n the Hood soundtrack
"You Can't Play with My Yo-Yo"	1991	Yo-Yo	Make Way for the Motherlode
"What Can I Do?"	1991	Yo-Yo	Make Way for the Motherlode
"Cooley Pop"	1991	Papa Freeze	I Wish My Brother Todd Was Here
"Killing Me Softly: The Deadly Code of Silence"	1992	Sister Souljah	360 Degrees of Power
"All on My Nut Sac"	1992	Da Lench Mob	Guerillas in tha Mist
"Two to the Head"	1992	Kool G Rap, Scarface, Bushwick Bill	Live and Let Die
"Trespass"	1992	Ice-T	Trespass soundtrack
"A Hoe B-4 tha Homie"	1993	King Tee	Tha Triflin' Album
"Watts Riot"	1993	Kam	Neva Again
"Last Wordz"	1993	2Pac, Ice-T	Strictly 4 My N.I.G.G.A.Z.
"The Bonnie and Clyde Theme"	1993	Yo-Yo	You Better Ask Somebody
"The Ill Shit"	1993	Erick Sermon, Kam	No Pressure
"Paint the White House Black"	1993	George Clinton, Dr. Dre, Public Enemy, Yo-Yo, MC Breed, Kam, Shock-G	Hey Man, Smell My Finger
"Intro"	1994	Don Jagwar	Faded
"Level-N-Service"	1994	Anotha Level	On Anotha Level
"Sticka"	1994	Terminator X, Chuck D, Ice-T, MC Lyte	Super Bad
"Hand of the Dead Body"	1994	Scarface, Devin the Dude	The Diary
"Play Witcha Mama"	1994	Willie D	Play Witcha Mama
"Cut Throats"	1994	Da Lench Mob, Mack 10	Planet of da Apes
"Mellow Madness"	1994	Da Lench Mob, K-Dee	Planet of da Apes
"Street Fighter"	1994	—N/a	Street Fighter 1994 soundtrack
"Higher"	1995	—N/a	Higher Learning soundtrack
"Asshole Naked"	1996	Luke	Uncle Luke
"Hoo-Bangin'"	1996	Mack 10	The Substitute (soundtrack)
"Bonnie and Clyde II"	1996	Yo-Yo	Total Control
"Wicked Wayz"	1996	Mr. Mike	Wicked Wayz
"Big Thangs"	1997	Ant Banks, Too $hort	Big Thangs
"Greed"	1997	—N/a	Gang Related – The Soundtrack / War & Peace Vol. 1
"I'm Afraid of Americans" ('V3' Remix)	1997	David Bowie	none
"Chicken Hawk 2"	1997	Mack 10	Based on a True Story
"The Guppies"	1997	Mack 10	Based on a True Story
"Only in California"	1997	Mack 10, Snoop Dogg	Based on a True Story
"Game Over"	1997	Scarface, Dr. Dre, Too $hort	The Untouchable
"Earthquake"	1997	E-A-Ski	none
"Dopest on tha Planet"	1998	Allfrumtha I, Mack 10	Allfrumtha I
"Children of the Korn"	1998	Korn	Follow the Leader
"Ghetto Vet"	1998	—N/a	I Got the Hook-Up soundtrack / War & Peace Vol. 1
"The Geto"	1998	Scarface, Willie D, K.B.	My Homies
"Comin' After You"	1998	MC Ren	Ruthless for Life
"Ghetto Horror Show"	1998	Mack 10, Jayo Felony	The Recipe
"Should I Stay or Should I Go"	1998	Mack 10, Korn	The Recipe
"Can't Hold Back"	1998	WC	The Shadiest One
"Like That"	1998	WC, Daz Dillinger, CJ Mac	The Shadiest One
"Maniac in the Brainiac"	1998	Mack 10	Bulworth soundtrack
"J.A.Y.O. – Justice Against Y'all Oppressors"	1998	Jayo Felony, E-40	Whatcha Gonna Do?
"You Know I'm a Hoe"	1998	Master P	The Players Club (soundtrack)
"Who Are You Lovin'"	1998	Mr. Short Khop	The Players Club (soundtrack)
"My Loved One"	1998	Mr. Short Khop	The Players Club (soundtrack)
"NYPD"	1999	Chris Rock, Horatio Sanz	Bigger & Blacker
"III: Tha Hood Way"	1999	MC Eiht, Mack 10	Section 8
"Murderfest 99"	1999	Road Dawgs, Boo Kapone, MC Eiht, Mack 10, Boobie	Don't Be Saprize
"You Ain't Know"	1999	Road Dawgs, Mack 10, Young Pretty, Q.S.-Bandit	Don't Be Saprize
"If I Should Die Before I Wake"	1999	The Notorious B.I.G., Black Rob, Beanie Sigel	Born Again
"Roll All Day"	2000	—N/a	Gone in 60 Seconds (soundtrack) / War & Peace Vol. 2
"Tha Weekend"	2000	Mack 10, Techniec	The Paper Route
"Behind Gates"	2000	E-40	Loyalty and Betrayal
"Set It Off"	2000	Snoop Dogg, MC Ren, The Lady of Rage, Nate Dogg	Tha Last Meal
"Short Khop & the Brain"	2001	Mr. Short Khop	Da Khop Shop
"Flashbacks"	2001	Mr. Short Khop	Da Khop Shop
"My Loved One" (Remix)	2001	Mr. Short Khop	Da Khop Shop
"One Way to Win"	2001	Mr. Short Khop, Mack 10	Da Khop Shop
"Lay It Down"	2002	8Ball, MJG, P. Diddy	Lay It Down
"Wanna Ride"	2002	WC, MC Ren	Ghetto Heisman
"What You Gone Do?"	2002	Mack 10	Da Hood
"Get Em Up"	2002	Paul Oakenfold	Bunkka
"The Shit"	2003	The D.O.C., MC Ren, Six Two, Snoop Dogg	Deuce
"Real Nigga Roll Call"	2004	Lil Jon & The Eastside Boyz	Crunk Juice
"Grand Finale"	2004	Lil Jon & the Eastside Boyz, Bun B, Jadakiss, Nas, T.I.	Crunk Juice
"Get U Down" (Remix)	2005	Warren G, B-Real, Snoop Dogg	In the Mid-Nite Hour
"LAX"	2006	Snoop Dogg	Tha Blue Carpet Treatment
"My Lowrider"	2006	The Game, Paul Wall, WC, E-40, Chingy, Techniec, Crooked I, Lil' Rob	Stop Snitchin' Stop Lyin'
"Defnition of Real"	2006	Scarface, Z-Ro	My Homies Part 2
"It's All Hood"	2006	Tha Dogg Pound, Snoop Dogg, Traci Nelson	Cali Iz Active
"Strizap"	2006	Daz Dillinger	So So Gangsta
"Tell Me When to Go" (Remix)	2006	E-40, Kanye West, The Game	none
"30 Something" (Remix)	2006	Jay-Z, André 3000	none
"Big Blacc Boots"	2007	Spider Loc	West Kept Secret: The Prequel
"Choppa's"	2007	Boyz n da Hood	Back Up N Da Chevy
"This Is Los Angeles"	2007	WC	Guilty by Affiliation
"Paranoid"	2007	WC	Guilty by Affiliation
"Guilty by Affiliation"	2007	WC	Guilty by Affiliation
"Keep It 100"	2007	WC	Guilty by Affiliation
"If You See a Bad Bitch"	2007	WC	Guilty by Affiliation
"Look at Me"	2007	WC	Guilty by Affiliation
"80's Babies"	2007	WC	Guilty by Affiliation
"Addicted to It"	2007	WC	Guilty by Affiliation
"Let It Fly"	2008	Trick-Trick	The Villain
"Blackboy"	2008	Tech N9ne, Brother J, Krizz Kaliko	Killer
"Be Easy" (Remix)	2008	Ghostface Killah	GhostDeini the Great
"State of Emergency"	2008	The Game	LAX
"Pressure"	2008	Killer Mike	I Pledge Allegiance to the Grind II
"Killas"	2010	Lil Jon, The Game	Crunk Rock
"Boogie Till You Conk Out"	2011	DJ Quik	The Book of David
"Please"	2011	EA-Ski	Fifth of Skihofen
"Hip Hop @ Funk U"	2011	Snoop Dogg, Chuck D	Tha Funk Capital of the World
"Iz You Ready to Die"	2011	Daz Dillinger	D.A.Z.
"You Know Me"	2011	WC, Young Maylay	Revenge of the Barracuda
"Chris Benoit" (Kuma's Scrub Club Remix)	2012	Insane Clown Posse, Scarface	Mike E. Clark's Extra Pop Emporium
"West Coast Shit"	2012	E-40, Too Short	History: Function Music
"Dodgers Anthem 2013"	2013	DJ Felli Fel, Tyga, Ty Dolla $ign	none
"Rebel Music" (Remix)	2014	MC Ren	Rebel Music
"The Position"	2014	MacShawn100, Snoop Dogg	The Position
"Issues"	2015	Dr. Dre, Anderson .Paak, Dem Jointz	Compton
"Don't Trip"	2015	The Game, Dr. Dre, will.i.am	The Documentary 2
"Legacy"	2016	Cold 187um, The D.O.C	The Blackgodfather
"Ain't That Funkin' Kinda Hard on You?" (We Ain't Neva Gonna Step Remix)	2016	Funkadelic, Kendrick Lamar	none
"Look at Me"	2017	TroyBoi	Left Is Right
"Celebrate"	2018	Boo-Yaa T.R.I.B.E., Ice-T, Kid Frost, King Tee	Godfather's Top Picks
"Raider Colors"	2021	Too $hort, Ne-Yo, DJ Nina 9, Rayven Justice	none
"¿Cuáles Fronteras?"	2023	Banda MS de Sergio Lizárraga	none
"Dump on Em"	2023	DJ Muggs, B-Real, MC Ren	Soul Assassins 3
"Till the Wheels Fall Off Remix"	2024	Cold187um, Sean Strange	none
"For the Love"	2025	Xzibit, Lorine Chia	Kingmaker

== Music videos ==
Music videos
Title	Year	Album
"Who's the Mack"	1990	Amerikkka's Most Wanted
"Jackin for Beats"	1990	Kill at Will
"Dead Homiez"	1990	Kill at Will
"Steady Mobbin'"	1991	Death Certificate
"True to the Game"	1991	Death Certificate
"Trespass" (with Ice-T)	1992	Trespass (OST)
"Wicked"	1992	The Predator
"It Was a Good Day"	1992	The Predator
"Check Yo Self" (Remix)	1993	The Predator
"Really Doe"	1993	Lethal Injection
"You Know How We Do It"	1994	Lethal Injection
"Bop Gun (One Nation)" (with George Clinton)	1994	Lethal Injection
"Lil' Ass Gee"	1994	Lethal Injection
"Natural Born Killaz" (Dr. Dre featuring Ice Cube)	1994	Murder Was the Case (OST)
"What Can I Do?"	1995	Bootlegs & B-Sides
"Friday"	1995	Friday (OST)
"Hoo-Bangin'"	1996	The Substitute (OST)
"The World Is Mine"	1997	Dangerous Ground (OST)
"Men of Steel" (Shaquille O'Neal featuring Ice Cube, B-Real, KRS-One and Peter Gunz)	1997	Steel (OST)
"We Be Clubbin'"	1998	The Player's Club (OST)
"Pushin' Weight"	1998	War & Peace Vol. 1
"Fuck Dying" (with Korn)	1998	War & Peace Vol. 1
"You Can Do It"	1999	Next Friday (OST)/War & Peace Vol. 2

== See also ==
- N.W.A. discography
- Da Lench Mob discography
- Westside Connection discography
