= Icon (Ice Cube album) =

Compilation album by Ice Cube
- Released: October 8, 2013
- Genre: Hip hop
- Label: Priority

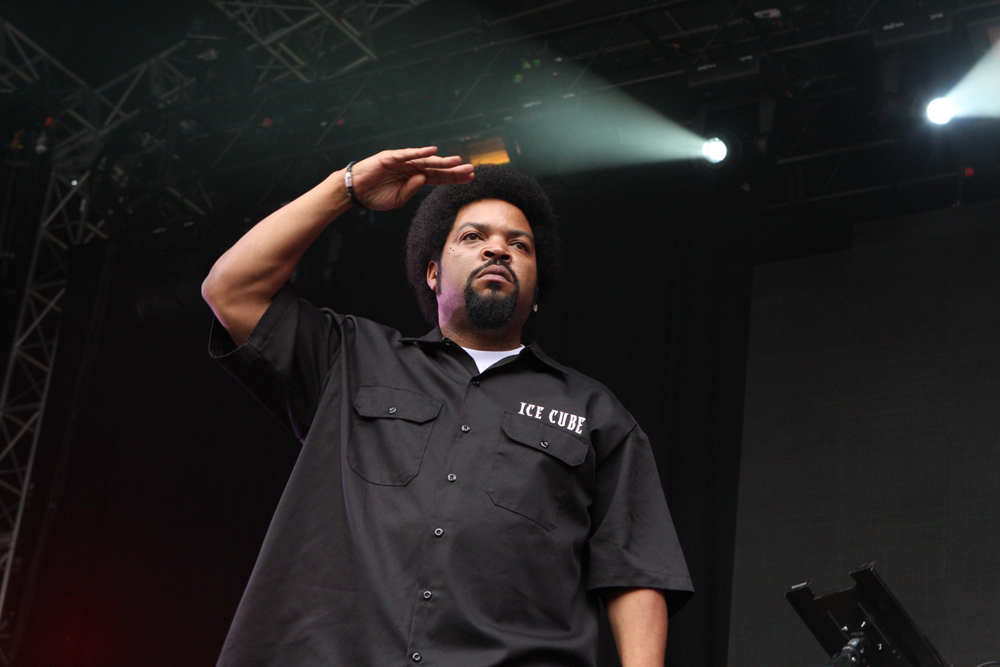
Ice Cube salutes the crowd while performing at Supafest 2012, Sydney, Australia

Icon is a compilation album by American hip hop artist Ice Cube. Consisting of songs from previous albums such as AmeriKKKa's Most Wanted, The Predator, War & Peace Vol. 1 (The War Disc), War & Peace Vol. 2 (The Peace Disc), Lethal Injection, and Death Certificate, it contains classic hits including "It Was a Good Day", "Steady Mobbin'", and "Check Yo Self". The collection, which includes 11 songs, is essentially a repackaged version of Ice Cube's 10 Great Songs album with the addition of "What Can I Do?" Released in 2013, the album grossed 50,000 sales globally according to Statistic Brain. Although the number of sales doesn't compete with some of his earlier work, the popularity of many of the tracks propelled this collection to critical acclaim.

== Track listing ==
#	Song	Year	Featured guests	Original album
1	"AmeriKKKa's Most Wanted"	1990		AmeriKKKa's Most Wanted
2	"Check Yo Self (Remix)"	1992	Das EFX	The Predator
3	"It Was a Good Day"	1992		The Predator
4	"Wicked"	1992		The Predator
5	"Pushin' Weight"	1998	Mr. Short Khop	War & Peace Vol. 1
6	"You Know How We Do It"	1993		Lethal Injection
7	"Steady Mobbin'"	1991		Death Certificate
8	"You Can Do It"	2000	Mack 10, Ms. Toi	War & Peace Vol. 2
9	"Really Doe"	1993		Lethal Injection
10	"Bop Gun (One Nation)"	1993		Lethal Injection
11	"What Can I Do? (Remix)"	1993		Lethal Injection
