= The Essentials (Ice Cube album) =

Greatest hits album by Ice Cube
- Released: September 16, 2008
- Recorded: 1990–2008
- Genre: West Coast hip hop
- Length: 1:11:51
- Label: Priority; EMI
- Producer: 88 X Unit; Boogiemen; Bud'da; Chucky Thompson; DJ Muggs; D'Maq; Hallway Productionz; Ice Cube; Laylaw; Lil' Jon; Loren Hill; Rich Nice; Scott Storch; Sir Jinx; The Bomb Squad
- Compiler: Frank Collura

Ice Cube chronology
| In the Movies (2007) | The Essentials (2008) | 10 Great Songs (2012) |

The Essentials is second greatest hits album by American rapper Ice Cube. It was released on September 16, 2008, via Priority Records, making it his fifth compilation for the label and overall.

Composed of 18 songs collected from all the Ice Cube's solo projects (from the 1990 debut AmeriKKKa's Most Wanted to the most recent at that time, 2008 Raw Footage), the compilation was produced by Frank Collura. It features hip hop production from the Boogiemen, Bud'da, Sir Jinx, The Bomb Squad, 88 X Unit, Chucky Thompson, DJ Muggs, D'Maq, Hallway Productionz, Laylaw, Lil' Jon, Loren Hill, Rich Nice, Scott Storch and Ice Cube himself, as well as guest appearances from WC, Das EFX, Kokane, Lil' Jon, Snoop Dogg and DJ Crazy Toones.

== Critical reception ==
Professional ratings
Review scores
| Source | Rating |
|---|---|
| AllMusic | 4/5 stars |
| MSN Music | A− |
| Pitchfork | 7.6/10 |
| PopMatters | 5/10 |
| RapReviews | 0/10 |

Robert Christgau of MSN Music gave the album "A−", saying "it leads with two of hip-hop's great anti-moralizing sermons, the Snoop- and Lil Jon-powered "Go to Church" and the grinder's credo "A Bird in the Hand", then proceeds to his greatest song, the fact-filled paraplegic memoir "Ghetto Vet". It closes with "Dead Homiez" and "Cold Places", two distinct and convincing arguments for keeping ya head up and ya ass off the street". AllMusic's David Jeffries considered it a "big blunder" to have "Cold Pieces" instead of "the superior 'Gangsta Rap Made Me Do It'" and the absence of "Bop Gun", but found that the "release dates are shuffled into a running order that makes sense" and called Soren Baker's essay "informed and insightful". Ian Cohen of Pitchfork resumed: "against the odds, the latest Ice Cube career comp mostly succeeds in balancing his MTV hits with the trenchant deep cuts that actually made him essential in the first place".

In his mixed review, Mike Joseph of PopMatters saw the album as "a horrible introduction if you're being introduced to Ice Cube for the first time, but it's hard to give a thumbs-up to an album that calls itself The Essentials when there's so much essential material missing". Steve 'Flash' Juon of RapReviews gave the album a derogatory 0 out of ten score, summing up with: "absolutely not essential. Important songs missing, unimportant songs included".

== Track listing ==
| No. | Title | Writer(s) | Producer(s) | Length |
|---|---|---|---|---|
| 1. | "Go to Church" (featuring Snoop Dogg and Lil' Jon) | O'Shea Jackson; Calvin Broadus; Jonathan Smith | Lil' Jon | 3:51 |
| 2. | "A Bird in the Hand" | Jackson; Mark Jordan; George Clinton; William Collins; Garry Shider; Ronald Dunbar; Donnie Sterling | The Boogie Men; Ice Cube | 2:12 |
| 3. | "Ghetto Vet" | Jackson; Lionel Hunt; Stephen Anderson | Bud'da | 4:38 |
| 4. | "Greed" | Jackson; Anderson | Ice Cube; Bud'da | 4:28 |
| 5. | "Supreme Hustle" | Jackson; Carl Thompson; Rich Shelton; Loren Hill; Woodrow Cunningham | Chucky Thompson; Rich Nice; Loren Hill | 3:37 |
| 6. | "It Was a Good Day" | Jackson; Marvin Isley; Rudolph Isley; Kelly Isley; Ernie Isley; Ronald Isley; Chris Jasper; Willie Albert Goodman; Harry Ray; Sylvia Robinson | DJ Pooh | 4:20 |
| 7. | "Spittin' Pollaseeds" (featuring WC and Kokane) | Jackson; William Calhoun; Jerry Long; Kevin Todd Jones; Rahsaan Patterson; Keith Crouch | Laylaw; D-Mac | 5:02 |
| 8. | "Rollin' with the Lench Mob" | Jackson; Keith Boxley; Eric Sadler; Clinton; Collins; Bernie Worrell | The Bomb Squad; Ice Cube; Sir Jinx | 3:44 |
| 9. | "The Wrong Nigga to Fuck Wit" | Jackson; Anthony Wheaton | Sir Jinx; Ice Cube | 2:49 |
| 10. | "When Will They Shoot?" | Jackson; Brian May | DJ Pooh; DJ Bobcat; Ice Cube | 4:35 |
| 11. | "Why We Thugs/Smoke Some Weed (Live)" (featuring WC and Crazy Toones) | Jackson; Scott Storch; Anderson | Scott Storch; Bud'da | 6:15 |
| 12. | "Givin' Up the Nappy Dugout" | Jackson | The Boogie Men; Ice Cube | 4:13 |
| 13. | "A Gangsta's Fairytale" | Jackson; Sadler | Ice Cube; Sir Jinx; The Bomb Squad | 3:01 |
| 14. | "Check Yo Self" (featuring Das EFX) | Jackson; Lawrence Muggerud | DJ Muggs; Ice Cube | 3:42 |
| 15. | "What Can I Do?" | Jackson; Victor Taylor; Arthur Ross; Leon Ware | 88 X Unit | 4:20 |
| 16. | "War & Peace" | Jackson; Anderson; Eric Stefani; Gwen Stefani | Ice Cube; Bud'da | 2:58 |
| 17. | "Dead Homiez" | Jackson | Ice Cube | 3:53 |
| 18. | "Cold Places" | Jackson; Teak Underdue; Dee Underdue | Hallway Productionz | 4:13 |
| Total length: | | | | 1:11:51 |

Sample credits

- Track 2 contains interpolations of "Bop Gun" written by George Clinton Jr., William Collins and Garry Shider and "Big Bang Theory" written by George Clinton Jr., Ronald Dunbar and Donnie Sterling.
- Track 5 contains a sample from "Kleer Sailin'" written by Woodrow Cunningham as recorded by Kleeer.
- Track 6 contains samples from "Footsteps in the Dark" written by Marvin Isley, Rudolph Isley, O'Kelly Isley Jr., Ernie Isley, Ronald Isley and Chris Jasper as performed by the Isley Brothers and "Sexy Mama" written by Willie Albert Goodman, Harry Ray and Sylvia Robinson as recorded by the Moments.
- Track 10 contains samples from "We Will Rock You" written by Brian May as recorded by Queen.
- Track 12 contains a sample of "Hip Hug-Her" written by Steve Cropper, Booker T. Jones, Al Jackson Jr. and Donald Dunn as recorded by Booker T. & the M.G.'s.
- Track 15 contains an interpolation of "I Want You" written by Arthur Ross and Leon Ware.
- Track 16 contains an interpolation of "Don't Speak" written by Eric Stefani and Gwen Stefani.

Notes

- Tracks 1, 7 and 11 (Note: The original versions of "Why We Thugs" and "Smoke Some Weed" (with respective credits) are taken from the Lench Mob Records release Laugh Now, Cry Later, while the medley was recorded live at Metro City, Perth, Western Australia) are taken from 2006's Laugh Now, Cry Later.
- Tracks 2, 9 and 12 are taken from 1991's Death Certificate.
- Tracks 3, 4 and 16 are taken from 1998's War & Peace Vol. 1 (The War Disc)
- Track 5 is taken from 2000's War & Peace Vol. 2 (The Peace Disc)
- Tracks 6, 10 and 14 are taken from 1992's The Predator
- Tracks 8 and 13 taken from 1990's AmeriKKKa's Most Wanted
- Track 15 is taken from 1993's Lethal Injection
- Track 17 is taken from 1990's Kill at Will
- Track 18 is taken from 2008's Raw Footage
