= Quincy Jones III production discography =

The following list is a discography of production by Swedish-American hip hop record producer Quincy Jones III. It includes a list of songs produced, co-produced and remixed by year, title, artist and album.

== Production credits ==
List of songs produced and/or co-produced, with other performing artists, showing year released and album name
Year	Song	Artist	Album	Notes
1987	"Special-K Is Good" (Radio Version)	Special K	N/A	co-produced by Special K
1990	"Swingin' wit' "T""	Tairrie B	The Power of a Woman	produced w/ Tairrie B
1990	"Murder She Wrote"	Tairrie B	The Power of a Woman	produced w/ Tairrie B
1990	"Let the Beat Rock"	Tairrie B	The Power of a Woman	N/A
1990	"Dance Baby"	G Love E	N/A	co-producer; prod. by Young MC
1990	"I Got the Knack"	Everlast	Forever Everlasting	N/A
1990	"Let's Have Some Fun"	Juvenile Committee	We're All in the Same Gang	N/A
1991	"Ridin' with the Rhythm"	Justin Warfield & The S.O.U.N.D.	Soundlab	N/A
1991	"Steppin' with the Sound"	Justin Warfield & The S.O.U.N.D.	Soundlab	co-produced by Justin Warfield
1991	"Season of the Vic"	Justin Warfield & The S.O.U.N.D.	Soundlab	N/A
1991	"I Need"	Kenyatta	Soundlab	co-produced by Harfez Coffey
1991	"Gotta Do More"	Kenyatta	Soundlab	N/A
1991	"Pumpin' It Up"	213	Soundlab	co-produced by DJ Ron Ski
1991	"Hip Housin'"	213	Soundlab	N/A
1991	"Catastrophe 1"	Poet Society	Soundlab	N/A
1991	"Livin' in the Ghetto"	Jazzy D	Soundlab	co-produced by Crazy Toones
1991	"Set Up"	S.T. One	Soundlab	N/A
1991	"Potty Train 'Em"	Poet Society	Soundlab	N/A
1991	"Grim Reaper"	Poet Society	Soundlab	N/A
1991	"Season of the R&B"	Justin Warfield with the S.O.U.N.D.	Soundlab	N/A
1991	"Catastrophe 2"	Poet Society	Soundlab	N/A
1991	"Gigolo Lifestyle"	S.T. One	Soundlab	N/A
1991	"Nice and Easy"	MC. Jr. Cas	Born 2 Flow	produced w/ D. Coffy, M. Johnson
1991	"No Future"	MC. Jr. Cas	Born 2 Flow	produced w/ D. Coffy
1991	"Put the Word Out"	MC. Jr. Cas	Born 2 Flow	N/A
1991	"Wild Side"	MC. Jr. Cas	Born 2 Flow	produced w/ M. Johnson
1991	"Strawberry Letter 23"	Tevin Campbell	T.E.V.I.N.	co-producer; prod. by Quincy Jones
1993	"Buckin' Em Down"	LL Cool J	14 Shots to the Dome	N/A
1993	"Back Seat (of My Jeep)"	LL Cool J	14 Shots to the Dome	N/A
1993	"Soul Survivor"	LL Cool J	14 Shots to the Dome	produced w/ Andrew Venable, Chris Forte
1993	"Guerillas Ain't Gangstas"	Da Lench Mob	Menace II Society (The Original Motion Picture Soundtrack)	N/A
1993	"IBWin' wit My Crewin'"	Yo-Yo	You Better Ask Somebody	N/A
1993	"Mackstress"	Yo-Yo	You Better Ask Somebody	produced w/ Crazy Toones, Ice Cube
1993	"20 Sack"	Yo-Yo	You Better Ask Somebody	N/A
1993	"You Better Ask Somebody"	Yo-Yo	You Better Ask Somebody	produced w/ Ice Cube
1993	"Girls Got a Gun"	Yo-Yo	You Better Ask Somebody	produced w/ Ice Cube
1993	"Tequila Flats"	Justin Warfield	My Field Trip to Planet 9	co-produced by Justin Warfield
1993	"Fisherman's Grotto"	Justin Warfield	My Field Trip to Planet 9	co-produced by Justin Warfield
1993	"Teenage Caligula"	Justin Warfield	My Field Trip to Planet 9	co-produced by Justin Warfield
1993	"Cool Like the Blues"	Justin Warfield	My Field Trip to Planet 9	co-produced by Justin Warfield
1993	"B-Boys on Acid"	Justin Warfield	My Field Trip to Planet 9	co-produced by Justin Warfield
1993	"Tequila Flats (Ghosts of Laurel Canyon)"	Justin Warfield	My Field Trip to Planet 9	co-produced by Justin Warfield
1993	"Just Another Day"	Too $hort	Get in Where You Fit In	N/A
1993	"Ghetto Bird"	Ice Cube	Lethal Injection	N/A
1993	"You Know How We Do It"	Ice Cube	Lethal Injection	N/A
1993	"Bop Gun (One Nation)"	Ice Cube, George Clinton	Lethal Injection	produced w/ Ice Cube
1993	"Make It Ruff, Make It Smooth"	Ice Cube, K-Dee	Lethal Injection	N/A
1994	"Love Is the Key"	LSD	Jason's Lyric (soundtrack)	
1994	"Environmental Terrorist"	Da Lench Mob	Planet of da Apes	N/A
1994	"What the Kidd Didd"	Jason Kidd, Money-B	B-Ball's Best Kept Secret	N/A
1994	"What Set U From"	Don Jagwarr	Faded	N/A
1995	"The World Is a Ghetto"	Da Lench Mob	Panther (The Original Motion Picture Soundtrack)	N/A
1995	"Intro"	Soultry	Soultry	N/A
1995	"I'll Get Mine"	Soultry	Soultry	N/A
1995	"Cash Money"	Soultry	Soultry	N/A
1995	"Sex in the Rain"	Soultry	Soultry	
1995	"Relax Your Mind"	Soultry	Soultry	N/A
1995	"Outro"	Soultry	Soultry	N/A
1995	"Rock with You"	Quincy Jones, Brandy, Heavy D	Q's Jook Joint	produced w/ Quincy Jones
1996	"Heaven Ain't Hard 2 Find"	2Pac	All Eyez on Me	N/A
1996	"PlayaHata"	Mr. X	Mr. X	N/A
1996	"Active Crew"	Mr. X	Mr. X	N/A
1996	"Dear God"	Mr. X	Mr. X	N/A
1996	"Flossin"	Mr. X	Mr. X	N/A
1996	"Can't Fade the Funk"	Mr. X	Mr. X	N/A
1996	"One Time (At My Door)"	Mr. X	Mr. X	N/A
1996	"Any Ole Sunday"	Mr. X	Mr. X	N/A
1996	"King of the Hill"	Westside Connection	Bow Down	N/A
1996	"Westward Ho"	Westside Connection	Bow Down	N/A
1996	"To Live & Die in L.A."	2Pac, Val Young	The Don Killuminati: The 7 Day Theory	N/A
1997	"Four Seasons"	Infinite Mass, Val Young	Alwayz Somethang	N/A
1997	"Free'em All"	J-Flexx, Tenkamenin	Gang Related – The Soundtrack	N/A
1997	"Questions"	Tech N9ne	Gang Related – The Soundtrack	N/A
1997	"Lost Souls"	Outlawz	Gang Related – The Soundtrack	produced w/ Sean "Barney" Thomas
1997	"Y Do Thugz Die"	Luniz, Val Young	Lunitik Muzik	N/A
1997	"Hellrazor"	2Pac, Val Young	R U Still Down? (Remember Me)	originally produced by Live Squad
1998	"Only Time You Love 'Em"	Mark Ronson, The Ghetto Inmates	The Flip Squad Allstar DJs	produced w/ Mark Ronson
1999	"9-5"	Lisa Stone	Office Space (The Motion Picture Soundtrack)	produced w/ Nature's Fynest
1999	"PJs"	George Clinton, LaRita & Marie Norman	The PJs (Music from & Inspired by the Hit Television Series)	N/A
1999	"Planet Rock"	Tech N9ne	Thicker Than Water (A soundtrack)	produced w/ Don Juan
1999	"Flipside (Rough Version)"	Tech N9ne	The Calm Before the Storm Part I	N/A
1999	"Questions (Rough Draft)"	Tech N9ne	The Calm Before the Storm Part I	additionally produced by Don Juan
1999	"Letter to the President"	Outlawz	Still I Rise	N/A
1999	"Teardrops and Closed Caskets"	Outlawz	Still I Rise	N/A
2000	"Strange"	Tech N9ne	The Worst (2K Edition)	produced w/ Don Juan
2000	"Friends"	2Pac	Too Gangsta for Radio	produced w/ Big Hutch
2000	"Thug Nature"	2Pac	Too Gangsta for Radio	N/A
2000	"Starry Night"	Mac Mall, Quincy Jones, Rashida Jones	The Rose That Grew from Concrete	N/A
2001	"Fuck Friendz"	2Pac	Until the End of Time	N/A
2001	"Niggaz Nature" (Remix)	2Pac, Lil' Mo	Until the End of Time	N/A
2001	"U Don't Have 2 Worry"	Outlawz	Until the End of Time	N/A
2001	"Let It Be Known"	Mack 10, Scarface, Xzibit	Bang or Ball	N/A
2006	"Soon As I Get Home"	2Pac, Yaki Kadafi	Pac's Life	N/A

== Remixes ==
List of songs remixed, with other performing artists, showing year released and album name
Year	Song	Artist	Album	Notes
1990	"Back on the Block" (Remix)	Quincy Jones, Big Daddy Kane, Ice-T, Kool Moe Dee, Melle Mel	N/A	additional producer; prod. by Quincy Jones
1991	"Steppin' with the Sound" (Q.D. III's Mellow Jazz Lab Mix) and (Union Square Mix)	Justin Warfield	N/A	N/A
1992	"Strawberry Letter 23" (QDIII Fat Mix)	Tevin Campbell	N/A	N/A
1992	"Freedom Got an A.K." (Remix)	Da Lench Mob	N/A	N/A
1993	"Hip Hop Lover" (Hip Hop Remix)	En Vogue, Kam	Runaway Love	additional producer; prod. by Foster & McElroy
1993	"Still Got Love 4 'Um" (Remix)	Kam	N/A	N/A
1993	"Written on Ya Kitten" (Q-Funk Radio Edit)	Naughty by Nature	N/A	remixed w/ Rob Chiarelli
1993	"Put Your Handz Up" (Remix)	The Whooliganz	N/A	N/A
1993	"U.N.I.T.Y." (Big Titty Edit), (Big Booty Edit), (Big Titty Mix) and (Remix Instrumental)	Queen Latifah	N/A	N/A
1994	"You Know How We Do It" (Remix)	Ice Cube	Bootlegs & B-Sides	N/A
1994	"When I Get to Heaven (Remix)"	Ice Cube	Bootlegs & B-Sides	
1994	"Letitgo" (Cavi' Street Edit)	Prince	N/A	N/A
1994	"Skip to My Lu" (Extended Mix), (Club Mix), (Radio Version)	Lisa Lisa	N/A	N/A
1994	"Phonkie Melodia" (Remix)	Tha Mexakinz	Zig Zag	N/A
1994	"Hey Mr. D.J." (Remix)	Zhane	Pronounced Jah-Nay	N/A
1994	"Fantastic Voyage" (QD III Remix)	Coolio	N/A	N/A
1995	"I'll Get Mine" (Remix)	Soultry, Rakim	N/A	N/A
1995	"Free" (Freestyle Mix)	Louchie Lou & Michie One	N/A	N/A
1996	"Good Sweet Lovin'" (Radio Mix)	Louchie Lou & Michie One	N/A	N/A
1997	"Who's the Mack" (QD III Mix)	Mark Morrison	N/A	additional producer; prod. by Mark Morrison
1997	"Show Me Love" (QD3 Fat Boy Remix)	Robyn, O.C., Rahzel	N/A	N/A
1997	"Do You Really Want Me" (QD3 Edit)	Robyn	N/A	N/A
1997	"Feel the Rhythm" (QDIII Soundlab Mix) and (QDIII Soundlab Dub Mix)	Charlene Smith	N/A	N/A
1998	"Let Me See" (QDIII Soundlab Mix)	Morcheeba	N/A	N/A
1999	"Respect" (Remix)	Silk-E	Urban Therapy	N/A
2001	"Contagious" (QDIII Radio Version)	The Isley Brothers	N/A	N/A
