= Bootlegs & B-Sides =

Compilation album by Ice Cube
- Released: November 22, 1994
- Recorded: 1992–1994
- Studios: QDIII (Los Angeles); Digital Services (Houston); Gumbo Kitchen
- Genres: West Coast hip hop; gangsta rap; political hip hop; hardcore hip hop; g-funk
- Length: 57:48
- Label: Priority
- Producers: 88 X Unit; Brian G; DJ Pooh; D'Maq; Dr. Jam; Ice Cube; Laylaw; N.O. Joe; Madness 4 Real; Mr. Woody; QDIII

Ice Cube chronology
| Lethal Injection (1993) | Bootlegs & B-Sides (1994) | War & Peace, Vol. 1 (The War Disc) (1998) |

Singles from Bootlegs & B-Sides
- 1. "What Can I Do?" Released: December 24, 1994

Professional ratings
Review scores
| Source | Rating |
|---|---|
| AllMusic | 2/5 stars |
| Music Week | 3/5 stars |

Bootlegs & B-sides is a compilation studio album by American recording artist Ice Cube released on November 22, 1994, via Priority Records. It is a collection of b-sides and remixes compiled from various 12-inches, originally recorded between 1992 and 1994. It includes the remix of the hit single "Check Yo Self", originally on The Predator album, and its b-side "24 Wit' An L". Production-wise, much of the album is very similar to the Lethal Injection album.

"D'Voidofpopniggafiedmegamix" is a mix of several tracks taken from Ice Cube's first four albums. The title may be a reference to D'voidoffunk from the P-Funk mythology.

Many of the song versions were later included on later remastered proper Ice Cube albums.

== Track listing ==
| No. | Title | Writer(s) | Producer(s) | Length |
|---|---|---|---|---|
| 1. | "Robbin' Hood (Cause It Ain't All Good)" | O. Jackson; M. Simmons; V. Taylor | 88 X Unit | 5:42 |
| 2. | "What Can I Do? (Remix)" (featuring Mack 10) | O. Jackson; M. Simmons; V. Taylor | 88 X Unit | 4:24 |
| 3. | "24 Wit an L" | O. Jackson; D. Myers; M. Hall; M. Williams | Ice Cube | 3:23 |
| 4. | "You Know How We Do It" (Remix) | O. Jackson; Q. Jones III; T. Life; D. Wansel | QDIII | 4:22 |
| 5. | "2 N the Morning" | O. Jackson; L. Goodman; D. McDowell; G. Clinton Jr.; G. Shider; D. Spradley | Laylaw; D'Maq (co.); Ice Cube (co.) | 3:59 |
| 6. | "Check Yo Self (Remix)" (featuring Das EFX) | O. Jackson; E. Fletcher; M. Glover; S. Robinson | DJ Pooh; Ice Cube | 4:33 |
| 7. | "You Don't Wanna Fuck Wit These" (Unreleased '93 Shit) | O. Jackson; H. Rasmussen; J. Dahl; L. Bavngaard; N. Kvaran; R. Berg | Dr. Jam; Madness 4 Real | 3:28 |
| 8. | "Lil Ass Gee (Eerie Gumbo Remix)" (featuring N.O. Joe) | O. Jackson; A. Wheaton; D. Davis; R. Walters | N.O. Joe | 5:18 |
| 9. | "My Skin Is My Sin" (featuring WC) | O. Jackson; H. Milling; H. Rasmussen; J. Dahl; L. Bavngaard; N. Kvaran; R. Berg | Dr. Jam; Madness 4 Real (co.) | 4:44 |
| 10. | "It Was a Good Day" (Remix) | O. Jackson; C. Mayfield; G. Clinton Jr.; W. Collins; B. Worrell | Ice Cube | 4:27 |
| 11. | "U Ain't Gonna Take My Life" | O. Jackson; A. Keidis; J. Frusciante; C. Smith; M. Balzary; J. Arrington Jr.; T. McElroy; D. Foster | Mr. Woody | 4:08 |
| 12. | "When I Get to Heaven (Remix)" (featuring Xavier Thomas & Shemen Tyler) | O. Jackson; B. Gallow; J. Nyx; M. Gaye | Brian G | 4:39 |
| 13. | "D'Voidofpopniggafiedmegamix" | O. Jackson; Q. Jones III; E. Fletcher; M. Glover; S. Robinson; G. Clinton Jr.; G. Shider; W. Collins; R. Ball; A. Gorrie; J. Stuart; B. Jones; S. Cropper; D. Dunn; A. Wheaton; R. Isley; F. Wesley; T. Life; D. Wansel; J. Brown | | 4:51 |
| Total length: | | | | 57:48 |

Sample credits

- Track 2 contains elements from "More Bounce to the Ounce" by Zapp
- Track 3 contains elements from "We Write the Songs" by Marley Marl
- Track 4 contains elements from "The Show is Over" by Evelyn "Champagne" King
- Track 5 contains elements from "Atomic Dog" by George Clinton
- Track 6 contains elements from "The Message" by Grandmaster Flash and the Furious Five
- Track 7 contains elements from "Hey What's That You Say" by Brother To Brother
- Track 8 contains elements from "La Di Da Di" by Doug E. Fresh
- Track 9 contains elements from "Ffun" by Con Funk Shun
- Track 10 contains elements from "Let's Do It Again" by The Staple Singers, and "Sir Nose D'Voidofunk" by Parliament
- Track 11 contains elements from "Sir Psycho Sexy" by Red Hot Chili Peppers, "I Gotcha" by Joe Tex, and "My Lovin' (You're Never Gonna Get It)" by En Vogue
- Track 12 contains elements from "Help From My Friends" by Parlet
- Track 13 contains elements from "The Message" by Grandmaster Flash and the Furious Five, "Bop Gun", "We Had to Tear This Motherfucker Up", "Steady Mobbin'", "Givin' Up the Nappy Dugout", "Jackin' for Beats", "No Vaseline", "Wicked", "A Gangsta's Fairytale", "Once Upon a Time in the Projects", "It Was a Good Day", "Who's the Mack", "You Know How We Do It" and "Get Off My Dick and Tell Yo Bitch to Come Here" by Ice Cube

== Personnel ==
- O'Shea Jackson – primary artist, vocals, producer (tracks: 3, 5, 6, 10), re-mixing (track 4)
- Dedrick D'Mon Rolison – featured artist (track 2)
- Andre "Drayz" Weston – featured artist (track 6)
- Willie "Skoob" Hines – featured artist (track 6)
- William Loshawn Calhoun Jr. – featured artist (track 9)
- Joseph Johnson – vocals & producer (track 8)
- Michael George Dean – vocals & keyboards (track 8)
- Xavier "Mr. X" Thomas – vocals (track 12)
- Shemen Tyler – vocals (track 12)
- Stan "The Guitar Man" Jones – guitar (track 12)
- Michael Keith Simmons – producer (tracks: 1, 2)
- Victor Nathan Taylor – producer (tracks: 1, 2)
- Quincy Delight Jones III – producer (track 4), re-mixing (track 12)
- Larry Goodman – producer (track 5), re-mixing (track 2)
- Derrick McDowell – producer (track 5), re-mixing (track 2)
- Mark Jordan – producer (track 6)
- Henrik Milling – producer (tracks: 7, 9)
- Jesper Dahl – producer (track 7), co-producer (track 9)
- Rasmus Berg – producer (track 7), co-producer (track 9)
- Lasse Bavngaard – producer (track 7), co-producer (track 9)
- Henrik Rasmussen – producer (track 7), co-producer (track 9)
- Peter Nicholas Secher Kvaran – producer (track 7), co-producer (track 9)
- Mr. Woody – producer (track 11)
- Brian Gallow – producer (track 12)
- John Moran – editor (track 8)
- Rob Chiarelli – engineering & mixing (track 12)
- Glenn "Gee-Swift" Aure – re-mixing (track 13)
- Art Shoji – design
- Ern Llamado – coordinator

== Charts ==
| Chart (1994–1995) | Peak position |
|---|---|
| Australian Albums (ARIA Charts) | 77 |
| US Billboard 200 | 19 |
| US Top R&B/Hip-Hop Albums (Billboard) | 3 |

== Certifications ==
| Region | Certification | Certified units/sales |
|---|---|---|
| United States (RIAA) | Gold | 500,000^{^} |
^{^} Shipments figures based on certification alone.
