= Really Doe =

Really Doe may refer to:

- "Really Doe" (Danny Brown song), 2016
- "Really Doe" (Ice Cube song), 1993
- Really Doe, rapper featured on We Major by Kanye West
