= Black. White. =

American cable reality television show

- Genre: Reality show
- Created by: David J. Maldonado Batista; R. J. Cutler
- Directed by: R. J. Cutler
- Starring: Rose Bloomfield, Bruno Marcotulli, Poetri, Brian Sparks, Nicholas Sparks, Renee Sparks, Carmen Wurgel
- Opening theme: "Race Card" by Ice Cube
- Composer: Leigh Roberts
- Country of origin: United States
- Original language: English
- No. of seasons: 1
- No. of episodes: 6

Production
- Executive producers: Ice Cube, R. J. Cutler
- Producers: Autumn Humphreys, Alexandra Reed, Matt Alvarez, Keith Hoffman, Donny Jackson, Rebecca Lock, Fernando Mills, Andy Robertson, Jude Weng, Nisa Ahmad, Jason Cornwell, Sarah N. Crouthamel, Todd Lubin, Eric Mofford, Keith VanderLaan
- Cinematography: Andrei Cranach
- Editors: Andy Robertson, Maris Berzins, Poppy Das, Greg Finton, Yaffa Lerea
- Production companies: Actual Reality Pictures; Cube Vision Productions; FX Productions
- Budget: $750,000 (estimated)

Original release
- Network: FX
- Release: March 8 – April 12, 2006

Black. White. is an American reality television series that aired on FX. The series premiered on March 8, 2006, and supposedly documented two voluntary families of three, one white, and the other black, in which, through studio-quality make-up, the two families would portray a race that isn't their own as a social experiment. It garnered controversy for its subject matter and perceived reinforcement of racial stereotypes.

The show was produced and created by Ice Cube and R. J. Cutler. The series' theme song was "Race Card", performed by Ice Cube and produced by Warren G. The series ran for five weeks ending with a double episode finale.

== Reception ==
The show received mixed responses. Melanie McFarland of the Seattle Post-Intelligencer stated, "No matter what conclusion you come to after watching FX's six-episode reality series 'Black. White.' you should be grateful for the care producers RJ Cutler and David Maldonado took in executing it." Matt Roush of TV Guide wrote, "Far from a cheap reality stunt, FX's provocative documentary series Black.White. is an endlessly curious and unexpectedly intelligent social experiment...." Charles Page of the Chicago Tribune said, "Compared to its obvious inspiration, 'Black Like Me,' it is easy to knock 'Black.White.,' the new reality TV experiment on race relations on FX—and many people do....Maybe it is. Or maybe it's a rare injection of substance into TV's usual nonsense."

The show also received criticism from major media outlets. Robert Bianco of USA Today wrote:

"The show is being sold on the race-switch trick, but tonight's premiere is built around a far more mundane stunt: putting people you know won't get along into close-quarter situations designed to exacerbate the inevitable conflicts. If you think there's any chance that the two men, Brian and Bruno, weren't cast specifically to clash, or that the producers aren't playing up every conflict, you've never seen a reality show."

"Black. White. is based on two false premises, one more pernicious than the other: that you can understand someone of a different race simply by putting on makeup, and that you need that kind of understanding in order to treat people as the law and morality require."

Lee Siegel of The New Republic commented:

"'Black. White.' is not a provocative study in secret prejudice, followed by growth and awakening. It's a reinforcement of the stereotypes the show claims it wants to examine and expose."

== Episodes ==
No.	Title	Directed by	Written by	Original release date
1	"Episode 1.1"	R. J. Cutler	Unknown	March 8, 2006
Two families—one white and one black—come together under one roof in Los Angeles as they prepare to go out in the world as the other race. Carmen Wurgel, her partner Bruno Marcotulli, and her daughter Rose Bloomfield are presented as the Wurgels, white middle-class suburbanites from Santa Monica, California. The Sparkses (Brian, Renee, and son Nick) are a black middle-class family from Atlanta, Georgia. Brian gains access to white culture when he lands a job as a bartender while in white make-up.
1	"Episode 1.2"	R. J. Cutler	Unknown	March 15, 2006
A bitter argument erupts between Renee and Carmen over the use of racially charged language. That racially charged language is when Carmen calls Renee a "bitch". Rose is torn over revealing her true "color" to her new friends in the poetry group or maintaining her cover for the sake of the project.
1	"Episode 1.3"	R. J. Cutler	Unknown	March 22, 2006
The Wurgels and Sparks lock horns over language and behavior. As the friction builds between Carmen and Renee, Carmen turns to an outsider for insight into the black experience. Bruno and Carmen encounter hostility in an all-white country/western bar, and Nick's fascination with the gangster/hip-hop lifestyle raises concerns for Brian and Renee.
1	"Episode 1.4"	R. J. Cutler	Unknown	March 29, 2006
Emotions run high as the project reveals unexpected truths about the family members. After experiencing racism for the first time, Carmen becomes disheartened with Bruno's obstinate views and expresses serious concerns about their future together. Rose struggles to fit in with her black friends. When Nick states he doesn't mind his etiquette classmates using a racial epithet in his presence, Brian and Renee take steps to educate Nick about his cultural roots, and why he should take offense to this word.
1	"Episode 1.5"	R. J. Cutler	Unknown	April 5, 2006
Tensions grow as the families struggle to find common ground. Rose develops a crush on a friend from poetry class. Renee develops a new friendship with a Catholic mother that transcends race, and Bruno and Brian reach an impasse over their different interpretations of racism.
1	"Episode 1.6"	R. J. Cutler	Unknown	April 12, 2006
Both families share the profound impact the six-week project has had on their lives and begin to reconcile their differences as the journey comes to an end. Rose prepares for her final performance before a live audience at the Slam Poetry event. Nick spends the day with an ex-gang member Kenny G. Renee and Carmen make amends, and Brian and Bruno agree to disagree, but Brian goes out with a bang by calling Bruno a racist.

== International broadcasts ==
In Canada, Black. White. aired on Sun TV, an independent broadcast television station in Toronto, Ontario, Canada. In Australia, the show was seen on Foxtel & Austar channel Fox8. It was also broadcast in Sweden on a public TV channel. A two-part French version of the show was produced and aired on Canal+ in January 2007, named Dans la peau d'un noir ("In Black Skin").

== DVD release ==
DVD name	Release date	# of Ep	Additional information
Complete Series	September 12, 2006	6	Audio commentary on every episode with cast and crew, Ice Cube's Black. White. Video, Applications and Original Casting Videos, Bruno's Rap, Black. White. Makeup Application, Study Guides DVD-Rom, Black. White. Makeup Slideshow, Rose's Poetry Slam, Black. White. Before. After.

== Awards and nominations ==
The series won an Emmy award for 'Outstanding Makeup for a Series (Non-Prosthetic)' in 2006, and was nominated for an Image Award for 'Outstanding Reality Series' in 2007.

== See also ==
- Blackface
- Whiteface
- Black Like Me
- Race Matters
