= Really Doe (Ice Cube song) =

Single by Ice Cube

from the album Lethal Injection
- B-side: "My Skin Is My Sin"
- Released: October 12, 1993
- Recorded: 1992
- Genre: West Coast hip hop; gangsta rap
- Length: 4:28
- Label: Priority
- Songwriters: O'Shea Jackson; Derrick McDowell; Larry Goodman
- Producers: Derrick McDowell; Laylaw

Ice Cube singles chronology
"Check Yo Self" (1993)	"Really Doe" (1993)	"You Know How We Do It" (1994)

Music video
- "Really Doe" on YouTube

"Really Doe" is a song recorded by American rapper and actor Ice Cube on his fourth studio album, Lethal Injection (1993), which serves as the lead single from the album. "My Skin Is My Sin", a song which later appeared on his album Bootlegs & B-Sides (1994), is the B-side for this song. "Really Doe" was released in October 1993, by Priority Records, and samples "You Gotta Believe It" by The Pointer Sisters and "Lick the Balls" by Slick Rick. The song is produced by Derrick McDowell and Larry Goodman, and its accompanying music video was directed by American director F. Gary Gray. B-Real of Cypress Hill also makes an appearance in the video as the judge.

== Charts ==
Chart (1993)	Peak position
Australia (ARIA)	59
UK Singles (Official Charts)	66
UK Dance (Music Week)	27
UK Club Chart (Music Week)	78
US Billboard Hot 100	54
US Hot R&B/Hip-Hop Songs (Billboard)	30
US Hot Rap Songs (Billboard)	3
US Maxi-Singles Sales (Billboard)	25
US Cash Box Top 100	35
