= War & Peace, Vol. 1 (The War Disc) =

Studio album by Ice Cube
- Released: November 17, 1998
- Genres: West Coast hip-hop; gangsta rap; hardcore hip-hop
- Length: 70:27
- Labels: Lench Mob; Priority
- Producers: Ice Cube; Bud'da; E-A-Ski; N.O. Joe; T-Mix; Butch; T. Walker; M. Demby

Ice Cube chronology
Bootlegs & B-Sides (1994)	War & Peace, Vol. 1 (The War Disc) (1998)	War & Peace, Vol. 2 (The Peace Disc) (2000)

Singles from War & Peace, Vol. 1 (The War Disc)
- 1. "Pushin' Weight" Released: October 27, 1998; 2. "Fuck Dying" Released: 1999

Professional ratings
Review scores
Source	Rating
AllMusic	2.5/5 stars
Christgau's Consumer Guide	(dud)
Entertainment Weekly	B+
Los Angeles Times	3/4 stars
NME	6/10
RapReviews	5/10
Rolling Stone	3/5 stars
The Source	3.5/5 stars
Spin	6/10

War & Peace, Vol. 1 (The War Disc) is the fifth studio album by American rapper Ice Cube. It was released on November 17, 1998, through Lench Mob Records and Priority Records. The album features production by Bud'da, E-A-Ski, Ice Cube, K-Mac, N.O. Joe and T-Mix. It is the first part from the two-album project War & Peace, the subsequent volume, War & Peace, Vol. 2 (The Peace Disc) was released in 2000.

This album was Cube's first album in five years since his last album, Lethal Injection, while he was working on other projects. The album received generally mixed reviews and debuted at number seven on the US Billboard 200 chart, selling 180,000 copies in the first week.

== Content ==
It moves from intense street-oriented jams to rap-metal fusions, such as the Korn featured song "Fuck Dying", to social commentary such as "Ghetto Vet". "Greed" was included on the album from Gang Related, released the previous year.

== Commercial performance ==
War & Peace, Vol. 1 (The War Disc) debuted at number seven on the US Billboard 200 chart, selling 180,000 copies in the first week. This became Ice Cube's fourth US top-ten album. On January 25, 1999, the album was certified platinum by the Recording Industry Association of America (RIAA) for sales of over a million copies in the United States.

Ice Cube performed on the 1998 edition of Family Values Tour, alongside Korn, Rammstein, Limp Bizkit and Orgy. Ice Cube performed as the third act between Rammstein & Limp Bizkit, and was there all the way up until the last five shows where he left to start filming Next Friday, with Incubus replacing him.

== Track listing ==
No.	Title	Writer(s)	Producer(s)	Length
1.	"Ask About Me"	O'Shea Jackson; Tristan Jones	T-Mix	3:06
2.	"Pushin' Weight" (featuring Mr. Short Khop)	Joseph Johnson; Jackson; Lionel Hunt	N.O. Joe	4:38
3.	"Dr. Frankenstein"	Jackson; Johnson; Joseph Hearne	N.O. Joe; Ice Cube; Joe Joe	4:54
4.	"Fuck Dying" (featuring Korn)	Jackson; Stephen Anderson	Ice Cube	4:03
5.	"War & Peace"	Jackson; Anderson; Gwen Renée Stefani; Eric Matthew Stefani	Bud'da; Ice Cube	3:18
6.	"Ghetto Vet" (featuring Mack 10 and Mr. Short Khop)	Jackson; Hunt; Anderson	Bud'da	5:05
7.	"Greed"	Jackson; Anderson	Ice Cube	4:29
8.	"MP" (skit)	Vyshonn Miller		0:49
9.	"Cash Over Ass"	Jackson; Ryan Gardner	Ice Cube	4:21
10.	"The Curse of Money" (featuring Mack 10)	Jackson; Johnson; Hearne; Dedrick Rolison	N.O. Joe; Ice Cube; Joe Joe	3:39
11.	"The Peckin' Order"	Jackson; Gerald Goffin; Michael Masser; Timothy Walker; Marlin Demby	Ice Cube; Deep Fried Damp	3:21
12.	"Limos, Demos & Bimbos" (featuring Mr. Short Khop)	Jackson; Hunt; Andy Summers; Richard Cousins	Rick Dutch Cousin	3:51
13.	"Once Upon a Time in the Projects 2"	Jackson; Anthony Wheaton; Betty Davis	Ice Cube	3:05
14.	"If I Was Fuckin' You" (featuring Mr. Short Khop & K-Mac)	Jackson; Hunt; Gardner; Kelly Garmon	Butch	3:28
15.	"X-Bitches"	Jackson; Johnson; Hearne	N.O. Joe	4:59
16.	"Extradition"	Jackson; Anderson	Ice Cube; Bud'da	4:38
17.	"3 Strikes You In"	Jackson; Johnson; Hearne; Kevin Gulley; Jerry Long; Gregory Hutchinson	N.O. Joe; Ice Cube	4:34
18.	"Penitentiary"	Jackson; Mark Ogleton; Shon Adams	E-A-Ski; Ice Cube	4:12
Total length:				70:27

== Charts ==
=== Weekly charts ===
Chart (1998)	Peak position
Australian Albums (ARIA)	68
Canadian Albums (Billboard)	13
UK Albums (Official Charts)	141
UK R&B Albums (Official Charts)	21
US Billboard 200	7
US Top R&B/Hip-Hop Albums (Billboard)	2

=== Year-end charts ===
Chart (1999)	Position
US Billboard 200	109
US Top R&B/Hip-Hop Albums (Billboard)	37

== Certifications ==
Region	Certification	Certified units/sales
Canada (Music Canada)	Gold	50,000^{^}
United States (RIAA)	Platinum	1,000,000^{^}
^{^} Shipments figures based on certification alone.
