= It Was a Good Day =

1993 single by Ice Cube

Single by Ice Cube

from the album The Predator
- Released: February 23, 1993
- Recorded: May 1992
- Genre: Hip-hop; G-funk
- Length: 4:20
- Label: Lench Mob; Priority
- Songwriters: O'Shea Jackson; Marvin Isley; Rudolph Isley; O'Kelly Isley; Ernie Isley; Ronald Isley; Chris Jasper
- Producer: DJ Pooh

Ice Cube singles chronology
"Wicked" (1992)	"It Was a Good Day" (1993)	"Check Yo Self" (1993)

Music video
- "It Was a Good Day" on YouTube

Audio sample
- file; help

"It Was a Good Day" is a song by American rapper Ice Cube, released on February 23, 1993, by Lench Mob and Priority as the second single from his third solo album, The Predator (1992). The song was written by Ice Cube and produced by DJ Pooh, peaking at No. 7 on the US Billboard Hot R&B/Hip-Hop Songs chart and No. 27 on the UK Charts. On the Billboard Hot 100, it peaked at No. 15, making it Ice Cube's highest-charting single on the chart to date. Its video was directed by F. Gary Gray. The song's lyrics describe a pleasant day in Cube's life with details like the Los Angeles Lakers beating the Seattle SuperSonics and no smog in Los Angeles.

"It Was a Good Day" ranked 81st on the list of greatest rap songs of all time by About.com, 77th on VH1's 100 Greatest Songs of the 1990s, 36th on Rolling Stone's 100 Greatest Hip-Hop Songs of All Time, and 352nd on the latter's list of the 500 Best Songs of All Time. In 2008, the song ranked 28th on VH1's 100 greatest hip-hop songs.

== Background ==
In 1992, Ice Cube recorded a demo of "It Was a Good Day" in his home studio and the album version at Echo Sound Studios, where it was one of the first ideas for his upcoming album. He has said, "The inspiration was my life at the time... I was at the top of the rap game. It was the summer of '92 and I was in a hotel room, really in a state of euphoria. I had all the money I had dreamed of. I was in a good frame of mind. And I remember thinking, 'Okay, there's been the riots, people know I will deal with that. That's a given. But I rap all this gangsta stuff—what about all the good days I had?'"

Ice Cube went into the studio with a sample of the Isley Brothers song "Footsteps in the Dark". DJ Pooh enhanced the production with bass and vocals. The song samples "Footsteps in the Dark, Pts. 1 & 2" and The Moments' song "Sexy Mama". It has been re-released multiple times, including on Ice Cube's Greatest Hits album, Bootlegs & B-Sides, and The N.W.A Legacy, Vol. 1: 1988–1998.

== Date of the "Good Day" ==
In a 2012 Tumblr post, comedian Donovan Strain used the song's lyrics to determine that the eponymous "Good Day" was likely January 20, 1992. Strain wrote that this date was "the only day where Yo! MTV Raps was on air, it was a clear and smogless day in Los Angeles, beepers or pagers were commercially sold, Lakers beat the Sonics, and Ice Cube had no filming commitments". Deadspin fact-checked some of the claims.

Online sleuths noted several inconsistencies in Strain's reasoning. For example, it was reported that Yo! MTV Raps did not air that day and that "it is unlikely that Ice Cube got 'a beep from Kim' for a booty call since the likely Kim, Ice Cube's fiancée by 1992, was eight months pregnant at the time". A blogger has since proposed that the day was November 30, 1988.

Ice Cube said the lyrics mention things that happened on different days: "It's a fictional song. It's basically my interpretation of what a great day would be… it's a little of this and a little of that. I don't think you can pinpoint the day."

== Goodyear Blimp campaign ==
In 2014, Ice Cube agreed to support a fundraising campaign started by four close friends calling themselves "diehard rap aficionados" who wanted to raise and donate $25,000 to the South Los Angeles charity and after-school youth center A Place Called Home (APCH) if the Goodyear Blimp displayed lyrics from the third verse of "It Was a Good Day". After Ice Cube spoke about the fundraising campaign on Late Night with Jimmy Fallon, Goodyear agreed. Given the nature of the fundraiser and the organization, Goodyear decided against using the word "pimp" and instead flew the blimp with messages reading "Today is a Good Day" and "Flying For a Good Cause—A Place Called Home".

In 2025, Goodyear sponsored Ice Cube's Truth to Power: 4 Decades of Attitude Tour, his first tour in over a decade. This time, the company promised to display the famous words "Ice Cube's A Pimp" on the Goodyear Blimp above select venues.

== Reception ==
The song was universally acclaimed by critics. AllMusic's Jason Birchmeier wrote that even though it was The Predator's "most laid-back moment, [it] emits a quiet sense of violent anxiety" and called the song "a truly beautiful moment, a career highlight for sure." In Blender magazine, Michael Odel wrote that the song had "a chilled-out, feel-good vibe". In Entertainment Weekly, Greg Sandow wrote that Ice Cube rapped over a "partly melancholy, partly swaggering beat [and] glories in good luck, South Central style". Robert Hilburn wrote in the Los Angeles Times, "Here is another one of pop's most gifted—and often misunderstood—artists. The images are a bit bawdy, but the track [...] is noteworthy for the way this controversial rapper reveals a welcome tender side." In his weekly UK chart commentary, James Masterton wrote, "Thus it is that when Ice Cube finally crosses over and gets his first UK hit, it is with 'It Was a Good Day', a laid-back mellow rap, far removed from his usual uncompromising throwdown and may even stand a chance of crossing over even further."

In Melody Maker, Jon Selzer called the song "so laid back and pastoral it could almost be DJ Jazzy Jeff & the Fresh Prince, but its tale of cruising and getting laid is undercut with a darker edge." In Music Week, Alan Jones gave the song three out of five, calling it "a rare low-key offering from the controversial rapper [that] inevitably mentions his bete noir—cops—but is an unusually optimistic celebration, set against samples from the Isley Brothers and the Moments." He added, "Likely to appeal to a wide audience, with good radio potential." Another Music Week editor, Andy Beevers, also gave it three out of five, writing that the song "sees Ice Cube in an uncharacteristically mellow and reflective mood. Its more commercial sound should reach beyond his fan base." In NME, Ian McCann wrote, "A slow, borrowed-from-the-Isley-Brothers groove just jogs along there somehow, and suddenly it's summer in the mean streets of LA." In Select, Adam Higginbotham called it a "laidback Isleys groove". In Spin, Charles Aaron wrote, "Outta the disastrous, misanthropic morass of The Predator emerges this way-too-real gangsta fairy tale. Cube is firing wildly in the wilderness, but don't toe-tag him yet." Vibe magazine referred to DJ Pooh's "smoothed-out production".

== Music video ==
The video for "It Was a Good Day" was directed by F. Gary Gray and first aired in March 1993. It was posted on YouTube in February 2009 and had more than 388 million views as of August 2026.

The video follows the song's lyrics, with Ice Cube waking in the morning in his house in Los Angeles, eating breakfast with his family, driving around in his green 1964 Chevrolet Impala, winning a pickup game of street basketball, avoiding police, going to a friend's house, watching Yo! MTV Raps, winning games of craps and dominoes, and thanking God for no gang violence–related deaths during the day. Later, he picks up a 12th-grade crush named Kim; they drink, smoke, watch an NBA game, and have sex; he then drives her home and goes to Fatburger. At the end, as Ice Cube is about to enter his house, LAPD police cars and helicopters surround him, but he ignores them and enters his house with police following him. Text onscreen reads "To Be Continued...", setting up the video to Ice Cube's next single, "Check Yo Self". WC of WC and the Maad Circle, Jerome "Shorty" Muhammad and J-Dee of Da Lench Mob, Ron Riser, and Robin Power appear in the video.

== Legacy ==
In June 1994, "It Was a Good Day" won an ASCAP R&B Music Award. It reached No. 36 on Rolling Stone's 100 Greatest Hip-Hop Songs of All Time and No. 77 on VH1's 100 Greatest Songs of the '90s. The song ranked 81st on About.com's Top 100 Rap Songs. In 2008, it ranked 28th on VH1's 100 Greatest Songs of Hip Hop.

== Track listing ==
- UK 2-track CD single
1. "It Was a Good Day" (Radio version)
2. "It Was a Good Day" (Instrumental)
- 12" vinyl

A1. "It Was a Good Day" (Radio version)
A2. "It Was a Good Day" (Instrumental)
B1. "U Ain't Gonna Take My Life" (LP version)
B2. "U Ain't Gonna Take My Life" (Instrumental)

== Charts ==
=== Weekly charts ===
Chart (1993)	Peak position
Australia (ARIA)	111
Europe (Eurochart Hot 100)	89
Europe (European Dance Radio)	14
UK Singles (Official Charts)	27
UK Airplay (Music Week)	36
UK Dance (Music Week)	10
US Billboard Hot 100	15
US Hot R&B/Hip-Hop Songs (Billboard)	7
US Hot Rap Songs (Billboard)	1
US Rhythmic Airplay (Billboard)	13
US Cash Box Top 100	16

Chart (2022)	Peak position
Hungary (Single Top 40)	7

=== Year-end charts ===
Chart (1993)	Position
US Billboard Hot 100	78
US Hot R&B Singles (Billboard)	49
US Hot Rap Songs (Billboard)	25

== Certifications ==
Region	Certification	Certified units/sales
Denmark (IFPI Danmark)	Platinum	90,000^{‡}
Germany (BVMI)	Gold	300,000^{‡}
Italy (FIMI) sales since 2009	Gold	50,000^{‡}
New Zealand (RMNZ)	5× Platinum	150,000^{‡}
Spain (Promusicae)	Gold	30,000^{‡}
United Kingdom (BPI)	Platinum	600,000^{‡}
United States (RIAA)	Gold	600,000
^{‡} Sales+streaming figures based on certification alone.
