= Wicked (Ice Cube song) =

1992 song by Ice Cube featuring Don Jagwarr

Single by Ice Cube featuring Don Jagwarr

from the album The Predator
- Released: November 3, 1992
- Recorded: 1992
- Studio: Echo Sound (Glendale, CA)
- Genre: Hip-hop
- Label: Priority
- Songwriters: O'Shea Jackson; Duane Earle; King Sun (uncredited)
- Producers: Torcha Chamba; Ice Cube; King Sun (uncredited)

Ice Cube featuring Don Jagwarr singles chronology
"True to the Game" (1992)	"Wicked" (1992)	"It Was a Good Day" (1993)

Music video
- "Wicked" on YouTube

"Wicked" is a song written and performed by American rappers Ice Cube and Don Jagwarr. It was released on October 16, 1992, via Priority Records as the lead single from the former's third solo studio album, The Predator (1992). Recorded at Echo Sound in Glendale, it was produced by Torcha Chamba and Ice Cube himself. The song marks Ice Cube's first single to enter the US Billboard Hot 100, peaking at number 55. It also reached number 48 on the US Cash Box Top 100 in the same period. On March 23, 1993, the single went certified gold by the Recording Industry Association of America for selling 500,000 copies in the US alone. The accompanying music video was directed by Marcus Raboy, starring Anthony Kiedis and Michael "Flea" Balzary of the Red Hot Chili Peppers.

== Track listing ==
No.	Title	Writer(s)	Producer(s)	Length
1.	"Wicked" (Radio)	O'Shea Jackson; Duane Earle	Torcha Chamba; Ice Cube
2.	"Wicked" (Instrumental)	Jackson	Torcha Chamba; Ice Cube
3.	"U Ain't Gonna Take My Life" (LP Version)	Jackson	Mr. Woody
4.	"U Ain't Gonna Take My Life" (Instrumental)	Jackson	Mr. Woody
5.	"Wicked" (LP Version)	Jackson; Earle	Torcha Chamba; Ice Cube

== Personnel ==
- O'Shea "Ice Cube" Jackson – lyrics, vocals, producer (tracks: 1, 2, 5), executive producer
- Duane "Don Jagwarr" Earle – lyrics & vocals (tracks: 1, 5)
- Torcha Chamba – producers & mixing (tracks: 1, 2, 5)
- Jesse "Mr. Woody" Stubblefield – producer & mixing (tracks: 3, 4)
- Mark "DJ Pooh" Jordan – mixing (tracks: 1, 2, 5)

== Charts ==
Chart (1992–93)	Peak position
UK Singles (Official Charts)	62
US Billboard Hot 100	55
US Hot R&B/Hip-Hop Songs (Billboard)	31
US R&B/Hip-Hop Airplay (Billboard)	71
US Hot Rap Songs (Billboard)	1
US Cash Box Top 100	48

== Certifications ==
Region	Certification	Certified units/sales
United States (RIAA)	Gold	500,000^{^}
^{^} Shipments figures based on certification alone.

== Cover versions ==
In 1996, the song was covered by Calla Destra for the electro-industrial various artists compilation Operation Beatbox.

== Korn version ==
"Wicked"

Song by Korn featuring Chino Moreno

from the album Life Is Peachy
- Released: October 15, 1996
- Recorded: 1996
- Studio: Indigo Ranch (Malibu, California)
- Genre: Rap metal; nu metal
- Length: 4:00
- Label: Immortal · Epic
- Songwriter: O'Shea Jackson

American nu metal band Korn recorded a cover of "Wicked" for their second album, Life Is Peachy (1996), featuring guest vocals by Chino Moreno of Deftones. Sources describe the recording as part of the 1990s rap-metal and nu-metal crossover movement.

The cover drew attention as one of the more notable tracks on Life Is Peachy and led to Korn's first proper collaboration with Ice Cube on "Children of the Korn", which came before his appearance on the band's 1998 Family Values Tour.

=== Critical reception ===
In a 2025 Revolver article, Gregory Adams described the interplay between frontman Jonathan Davis and Moreno on "Wicked" as raw, loose, and unusually intimate. Kerrang! highlighted the chorus of "Wicked" as one of Davis's most unrestrained early scatting performances, reflecting his developing nu-metal vocal style. The cover has been cited as an example of nu-metal's blending of hip-hop and heavy music influences.
