= Check Yo Self =

Single by Ice Cube featuring Das EFX

from the album The Predator
- Released: July 13, 1993
- Recorded: 1992; 1993 (remix)
- Genre: Gangsta rap; G-funk; West Coast hip hop
- Length: 3:42
- Label: Lench Mob; Priority
- Songwriter: Ice Cube
- Producers: DJ Muggs; Ice Cube (co.)

Ice Cube singles chronology
"It Was a Good Day" (1993)	"Check Yo Self" (1993)	"Really Doe" (1993)

Music video
- "Check Yo Self" on YouTube

"Check Yo Self" is the third and final single from American rapper Ice Cube's third solo album, The Predator (1992). It was released on July 13, 1993 by Lench Mob Records and Priority Records, and features New York City rap duo Das EFX. It topped both the US Billboard R&B/Hip-Hop and Rap charts while also reaching number 20 on the Hot 100 chart. The song consists of two main versions, the original and a remix which utilizes the same beat as Grandmaster Flash's "The Message", titled "Check Yo Self (The Message Remix)". The original mix uses a sample of the Sweet Inspirations version of the Ikettes's "I'm Blue (The Gong-Gong Song)", and also a sample from the intro of the Beastie Boys' track "The New Style", which uses the phrase "check it" throughout the chorus.

While the single version of the song (also titled Radio Remix "The Message") has been censored, the longer, uncensored version of The Message remix is featured on Ice Cube's Bootlegs & B-Sides album and was later released on his Greatest Hits album. The clean version of "Check Yo Self (The Message Remix)" appeared in the soundtrack of the movie Harold & Kumar Escape from Guantanamo Bay. A new recording, based on the original version of the song, featuring Chuck D was featured in the 2010 film Due Date. In January 2010, Snoop Dogg released a cover version of the song. Guitarist Wayne Krantz included an instrumental version of the song (based on the "message remix" version) on his 2012 album Howie 61.

== Music video ==
The music video for "Check Yo Self" uses the remix version. Similar to the video for his previous single "It Was a Good Day", most of the scenes follow and illustrate the respective lyrics of the song. The video continues where "It Was a Good Day" left off, with Ice Cube's home being surrounded and invaded by the LAPD before he is handcuffed and taken under arrest, presumably for murder. Ice Cube is then brought to L.A. County jail where he spends the majority of the video experiencing the conflict described in the lyrics, such as disputes between cellmates and breaking up with his girlfriend. Cube also references his role in Boyz n the Hood, in the lyric "Oh boy, I make dough, but don't call me Doughboy, this ain't no fucking motion picture". After six months have passed, Ice Cube is able to win over the female deputy watching him. She helps him break out by dressing him up in a uniform. The two make their way outside to a police cruiser and drive off into the night.

== Track listing ==
1. "Check Yo' Self" (radio remix "The Message")
2. "Check Yo' Self" (remix instrumental)
3. "It Was a Good Day" (radio remix edit)
4. "It Was a Good Day" (remix instrumental)
5. "24 with an L"

== Charts ==
=== Weekly charts ===
Chart (1993)	Peak position
Australia (ARIA)	80
Europe (European Dance Radio)	19
UK Singles (Official Charts)	36
US Billboard Hot 100	20
US Hot R&B/Hip-Hop Songs (Billboard)	1
US Hot Rap Songs (Billboard)	1
US Maxi-Singles Sales (Billboard)	1
US Cash Box Top 100	13

=== Year-end charts ===
Chart (1993)	Position
US Billboard Hot 100	86
US Hot R&B Singles (Billboard)	57

== Certifications ==
Region	Certification	Certified units/sales
New Zealand (RMNZ)	Platinum	30,000^{‡}
United Kingdom (BPI)	Silver	200,000^{‡}
United States (RIAA)	Platinum	1,000,000
^{‡} Sales+streaming figures based on certification alone.

== See also ==
- R&B number-one hits of 1993 (USA)
