= Ice Cube =

American rapper and actor (born 1969)

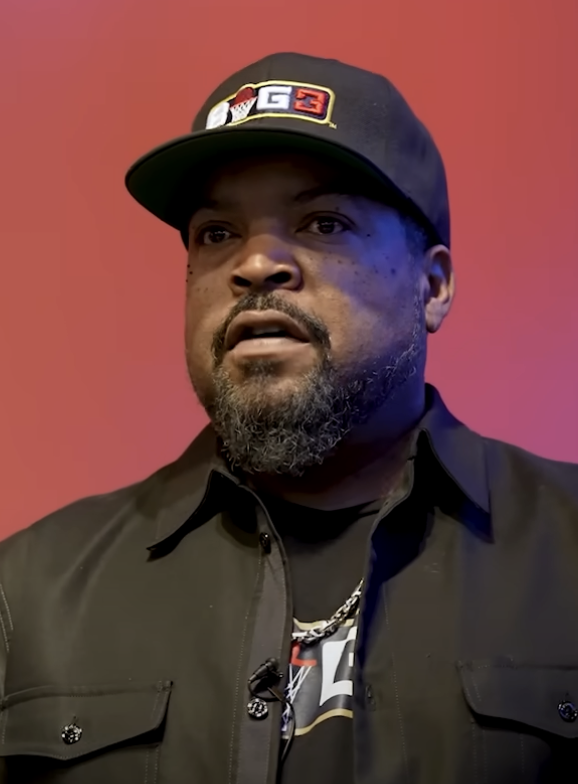
- Ice Cube in 2025
- Born: O'Shea Jackson; June 15, 1969 (age 57); Los Angeles, California, U.S.
- Education: Phoenix Institute of Technology (Dip.)
- Occupations: Rapper; songwriter; actor; film producer; screenwriter
- Years active: 1986–present
- Organization(s): Lench Mob Records; Cube Vision; Big3
- Spouse: Kimberly Woodruff (m. 1992)
- Children: 4, including O'Shea Jr.
- Relatives: Del the Funky Homosapien (cousin); Kam (cousin)
- Musical career
- Genres: West Coast hip-hop; gangsta rap; political hip-hop
- Labels: Lench Mob; Priority; Aftermath; EMI; Interscope
- Member of: Mount Westmore
- Formerly of: C.I.A.; N.W.A; Da Lench Mob; Westside Connection
- Website: icecube.com

O'Shea Jackson (born June 15, 1969), known professionally as Ice Cube, is an American rapper, songwriter, actor, and film producer. His efforts on N.W.A's 1989 album Straight Outta Compton contributed to gangsta rap's popularity, and his political rap solo albums AmeriKKKa's Most Wanted (1990), Death Certificate (1991), and The Predator (1992) were all critically and commercially successful. He was inducted into the Rock and Roll Hall of Fame as a member of N.W.A in 2016.

A native of Los Angeles, Ice Cube formed his first rap group called C.I.A. in 1986. In 1987, with Eazy-E and Dr. Dre, he formed the gangsta rap group N.W.A. As its lead rapper, Ice Cube also wrote most of the lyrics on Straight Outta Compton, a landmark album that shaped West Coast hip-hop's early violent and controversial identity and helped differentiate it from East Coast rap. After a monetary dispute over the group's management by Eazy-E and Jerry Heller, Ice Cube left N.W.A in late 1989 and embarked on a solo career, releasing eleven albums, with seven charting within the top-10 on the U.S. Billboard 200. His singles "It Was a Good Day", "Check Yo Self", "You Know How We Do It", "Bop Gun (One Nation)", "Pushin' Weight", and "You Can Do It" all charted in the top-40 on the U.S. Billboard Hot 100.

Ice Cube has also had an active film career since the early 1990s. His first acting role was in the hood film Boyz n the Hood (1991), named after a 1987 N.W.A. song he wrote. He also co-wrote and starred in the 1995 comedy film Friday, which spawned a franchise and reshaped his public image into an actor. He made his directorial debut with the 1998 film The Players Club, and also produced and curated the film's accompanying soundtrack. His film credits include the comedies Three Kings (1999), the Barbershop and Are We There Yet? franchises, 21 Jump Street (2012), 22 Jump Street, Ride Along (both 2014) and Ride Along 2 (2016). He has also appeared in the XXX franchise (2005–2017), the crime drama Rampart (2012), the animated fantasy The Book of Life (2014), and the thriller War of the Worlds (2025). Ice Cube has also served as executive producer, including for the 2015 biopic Straight Outta Compton.

== Early life ==
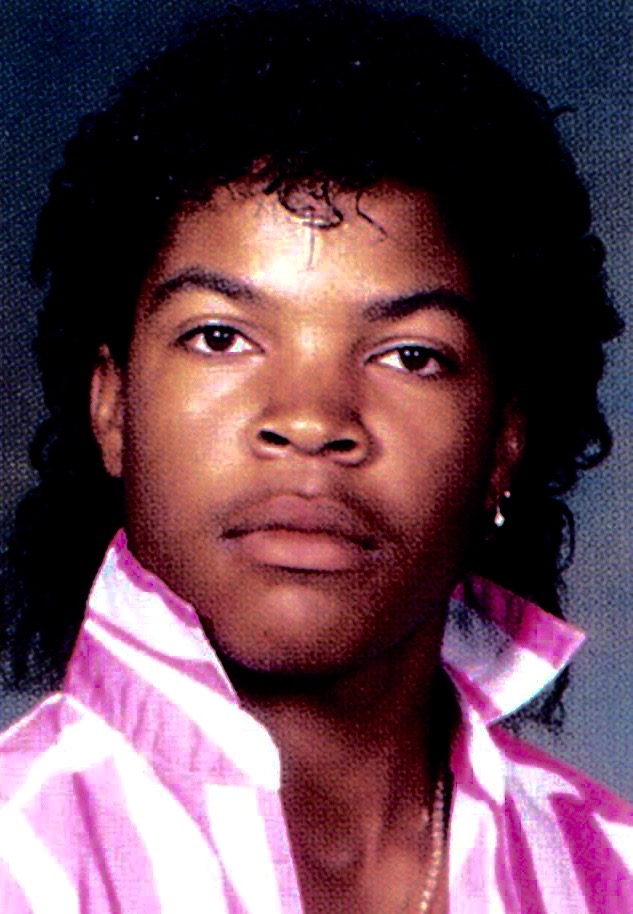
Jackson as a high school senior in 1987

O'Shea Jackson was born in Los Angeles on June 15, 1969, to hospital clerk and custodian Doris and machinist and University of California, Los Angeles (UCLA) groundskeeper Hosea Jackson. He has an older brother, and they had a half-sister who was murdered when Cube was 12. He is a cousin of fellow rappers Del tha Funky Homosapien and Kam. He grew up on Van Wick Street in the Westmont section of South Los Angeles. In ninth grade at George Washington Preparatory High School in Los Angeles, Cube began writing raps after being challenged by his friend "Kiddo" in typewriting class. Kiddo lost. He has said that his stage name came from his older brother, who "threatened to slam [him] into a freezer and pull [him] out when [he] was an ice cube".

Cube also attended William Howard Taft High School in the Woodland Hills area of Los Angeles. He was bused 40 miles (64 km) to the suburban school from his home in a high-crime neighborhood. In Q3 of 1987, soon after he wrote and recorded a few locally successful rap songs with N.W.A, he enrolled at the Phoenix Institute of Technology Phoenix, Arizona. He earned a one-year diploma in architectural drafting and he returned to Los Angeles and rejoined N.W.A, keeping a career in architecture drafting as a backup plan.

== Music career ==
=== Early work ===
In 1986, at the age of 16, Ice Cube began rapping in the trio C.I.A. but soon joined the newly formed rap group N.W.A. He was N.W.A's lead rapper and main ghostwriter on its official debut album, 1989's Straight Outta Compton. Due to a financial dispute, he left the group by the start of 1990. During 1990, his debut solo album, AmeriKKKa's Most Wanted, found him also leading a featured rap group, Da Lench Mob. Meanwhile, he helped develop the rapper Yo Yo.

=== 1986: C.I.A. ===
With friend Sir Jinx, Ice Cube formed the rap group C.I.A., and performed at parties hosted by Dr. Dre. Since 1984, Dre had been a member of a popular DJ crew, the World Class Wreckin' Cru, which by 1985 was also performing and recording electro rap. Dre had Cube help write the Wreckin Cru's hit song "Cabbage Patch". Dre also joined Cube on a side project, a duo called Stereo Crew, which made a 12-inch record, "She's a Skag", released on Epic Records in 1986.

In 1987, C.I.A. released the Dr. Dre-produced single "My Posse". Meanwhile, the Wreckin' Cru's home base was the Eve After Dark nightclub, about a quarter of a mile outside of the city of Compton in Los Angeles County. While Dre was on the turntable, Ice Cube would rap, often parodying other artists' songs. In one instance, Cube's rendition was "My Penis", parodying Run-DMC's "My Adidas". In 2015, the nightclub's co-owner and Wreckin' leader Alonzo Williams would recall feeling his reputation damaged by this and asking it not to be repeated.

=== 1986–1989: N.W.A ===
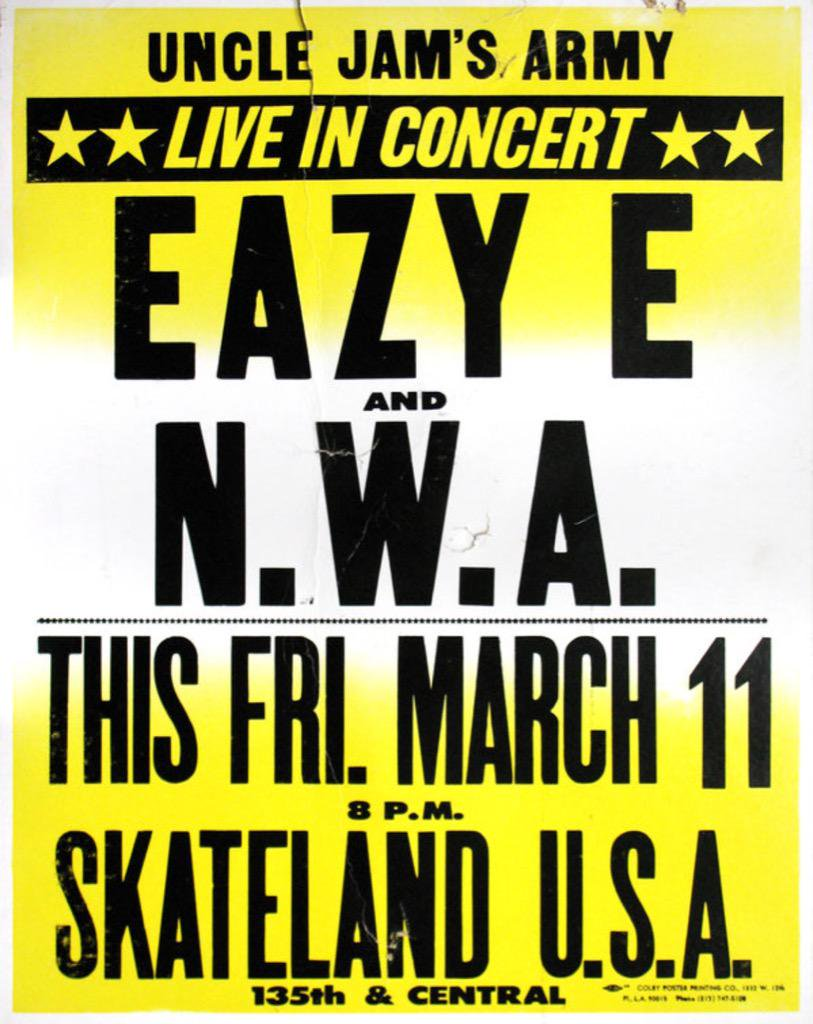
Poster for one of N.W.A's first concerts at a Compton skating rink, 1988

At 16, Cube sold his first song to Eric Wright, soon dubbed Eazy-E, who was forming Ruthless Records and the musical team N.W.A, based in Compton, California. Himself from South Central Los Angeles, Cube would be N.W.A's only core member not born in Compton.

Upon the success of the song "Boyz-n-the-Hood"—written by Cube, produced by Dre, and rapped by Eazy-E, helping establish gangsta rap in California—Eazy focused on developing N.W.A, which soon gained MC Ren. Cube wrote some of Dre's and nearly all of Eazy's lyrics on N.W.A's official debut album, Straight Outta Compton, released in January 1989. Yet by the end of the year, Cube questioned his compensation and N.W.A's management by Jerry Heller.

Cube also wrote most of Eazy-E's debut album Eazy-Duz-It. He received a total pay of $32,000, and the contract that Heller presented in 1989 did not confirm that he was officially an N.W.A member. After leaving the group in December 1989, Cube sued Heller, and the lawsuit was later settled out of court. In response, N.W.A members attacked Cube on the 1990 EP 100 Miles and Runnin', and on N.W.A's next and final album, Niggaz4Life, in 1991.

=== 1990–1993: Early solo career, AmeriKKKa's Most Wanted, Death Certificate, and The Predator ===
In early 1990, Ice Cube recorded his debut solo album, AmeriKKKa's Most Wanted, in New York with iconic rap group Public Enemy's production team, the Bomb Squad. Arriving in May 1990, it was an instant hit, further swelling rap's mainstream integration. Controversial nonetheless, it drew accusations of misogyny and racism. The album introduces Ice Cube's affirmation of black nationalism and ideology of black struggle.

Cube appointed Yo-Yo, a female rapper and guest on the album, to be the head of his record label, and helped produce her debut album, Make Way for the Motherlode. Also in 1990, Cube followed up with an EP—Kill At Will—critically acclaimed, and rap's first EP certified Platinum.

His second album Death Certificate was released in 1991. The album was thought to be more focused, yet even more controversial, triggering accusations of anti-white, antisemitic, and misogynistic content. The album was split into two themes: the Death Side, "a vision of where we are today", and the Life Side, "a vision of where we need to go". The track "No Vaseline" scathingly retorts insults directed at him by N.W.A's 1990 EP and 1991 album, which call him a traitor. Besides calling for hanging Eazy-E as a "house nigga", the track blames N.W.A's manager Jerry Heller for exploiting the group, mentions that he is a Jew, and calls for his murder. Ice Cube contended that he mentioned Heller's ethnicity merely incidentally, not to premise attack, but as news media mention nonwhite assailants' races. The track "Black Korea", also deemed racist, was also thought as foreseeing the 1992 Los Angeles riots. While controversial, Death Certificate broadened his audience; he toured with Lollapalooza in 1992.

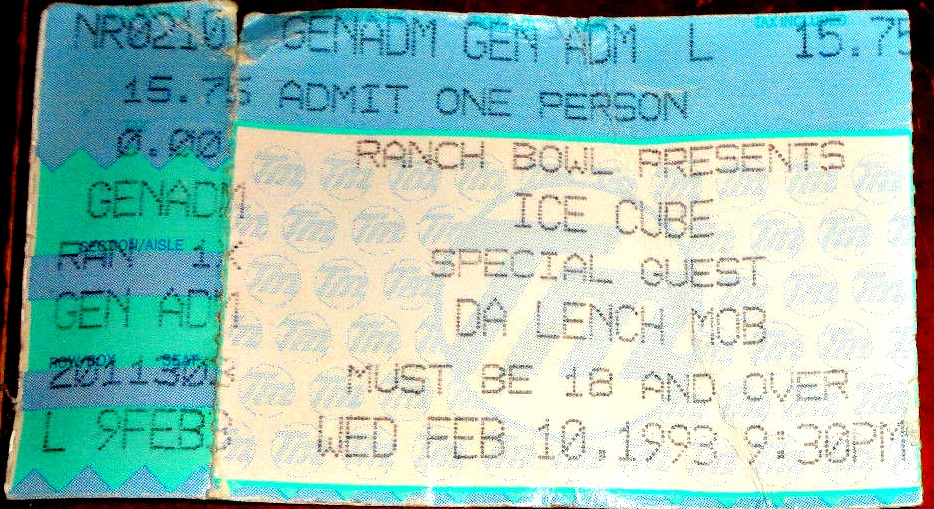
A ticket from a 1993 Ice Cube concert in Omaha, Nebraska

Cube's third album, The Predator, was released in November 1992. Referring to the 1992 Los Angeles riots, the song "Wicked" opens, "April 29 was power to the people, and we might just see a sequel." The Predator was the first album ever to debut at No. 1 on both the R&B/hip-hop and pop charts. Singles include "It Was a Good Day" and "Check Yo Self", songs having a "two-part" music video. Generally drawing critical praise, the album is his most successful commercially, over three million copies sold in the US. After this album, Cube's rap audience severely diminished, and never regained the prominence of his first three albums.

During this time, Cube began to have numerous features on other artists' songs. In 1992, Cube appeared on Del the Funky Homosapien's debut album I Wish My Brother George Was Here, on Da Lench Mob's debut Guerillas in tha Mist, which he also produced, and on the Kool G Rap and DJ Polo song "Two to the Head". In 1993, he worked on Kam's debut album, and collaborated with Ice-T on the track "Last Wordz" on 2Pac's album Strictly 4 My N.I.G.G.A.Z..

=== 1993–1998: Lethal Injection and forming Westside Connection ===
Cube's fourth album, Lethal Injection, came out in late 1993. Here, Cube borrowed from the then-popular G-funk popularized by Dr. Dre. Although not received well by critics, the album brought successful singles, including "Really Doe", "Bop Gun (One Nation)", "You Know How We Do It", and "What Can I Do?" After this album, Ice Cube effectively lost his rap audience.

Following Lethal Injection, Cube focused on films and producing albums of other rappers, including Da Lench Mob, Mack 10, Mr. Short Khop, and Kausion. In 1994, Cube teamed with onetime N.W.A groupmate Dr. Dre, who was then leading rap's G-funk subgenre, for the first time since Cube had left the group, and which had disbanded upon Dre's 1991 departure. The result was the Cube and Dre song "Natural Born Killaz", on the Murder Was The Case soundtrack, released by Dre's then-new label, Death Row Records.

In 1995, Cube joined Mack 10 and WC in forming a side trio, the Westside Connection. Feeling neglected by East Coast media, a longstanding issue in rap's bicoastal rivalry, the group aimed to reinforce West pride and resonate with the undervalued. The Westside Connection's first album, Bow Down (1996), featured tracks like "Bow Down" and "Gangstas Make the World Go 'Round" that reflected the group's objectives. The album was certified Platinum by year's end. Interpreting rapper Common's song "I Used to Love H.E.R." as a diss of West Coast rap, Cube and the Westside Connection briefly feuded with him, but they resolved amicably in 1997.

It was also at this time that Cube began collaborating outside the rap genre. In 1997, he worked with David Bowie and Nine Inch Nails singer Trent Reznor on a remix of Bowie's "I'm Afraid of Americans". In 1998, Cube was featured on the band Korn's song "Children of the Korn", and joined them on their Family Values Tour 1998.

=== 1998–2006: War & Peace Vol. 1 & 2 and Westside Connection reunion ===
In November 1998, Cube released his long-awaited fifth solo album War & Peace Vol. 1 (The War Disc). The delayed sixth album, Volume 2, arrived in 2000. These albums feature the Westside Connection and a reunion with his old N.W.A members Dr. Dre and MC Ren. Cube also received a return favor from Korn, as they appeared on his song "Fuck Dying" from Vol. 1. Many fans maintained that these two albums, especially the second, were lesser in quality to his earlier work. In 2000, Cube also joined Dr. Dre, Eminem, and Snoop Dogg for the Up in Smoke Tour.

In 2002, Cube appeared on British DJ Paul Oakenfold's solo debut album, Bunkka, on the track "Get Em Up".

Released in 2003, Westside Connection's second album, Terrorist Threats, fared well critically, but saw lesser sales. "Gangsta Nation" (featuring Nate Dogg), the only single released, was a radio hit. After a rift between Cube and Mack 10 about Cube's film work minimizing the group's touring, the Westside Connection disbanded in 2005.

In 2004, Cube featured on the song "Real Nigga Roll Call" by Lil Jon & the East Side Boyz, the then-leaders of rap's crunk subgenre.

=== 2006–2012: Laugh Now, Cry Later, Raw Footage, and I Am the West ===
In 2006, Cube released his seventh solo album, Laugh Now, Cry Later, selling 144,000 units in the first week. Lil Jon and Scott Storch produced the lead single, "Why We Thugs". In October, Ice Cube was honored at VH1's Annual Hip Hop Honors, and performed it and also the track "Go to Church". Cube soon toured globally in the Straight Outta Compton Tour—accompanied by rapper WC from the Westside Connection—playing in America, Europe, Australia, and Japan.

Amid Cube's many features and brief collaborations, September 2007 brought In the Movies, a compilation album of Ice Cube songs on soundtracks.

Cube's eighth studio album, Raw Footage, arrived on August 19, 2008, yielding the singles "Gangsta Rap Made Me Do It" and "Do Ya Thang". Also in 2008, Cube helped on Tech N9ne's song "Blackboy", and was featured on The Game's song "State of Emergency".

As a fan of the NFL football team the Raiders, Cube released in October 2009 a tribute song, "Raider Nation". In 2009, Ice Cube performed at the Gathering of the Juggalos, and returned to perform at the 2011 festival.

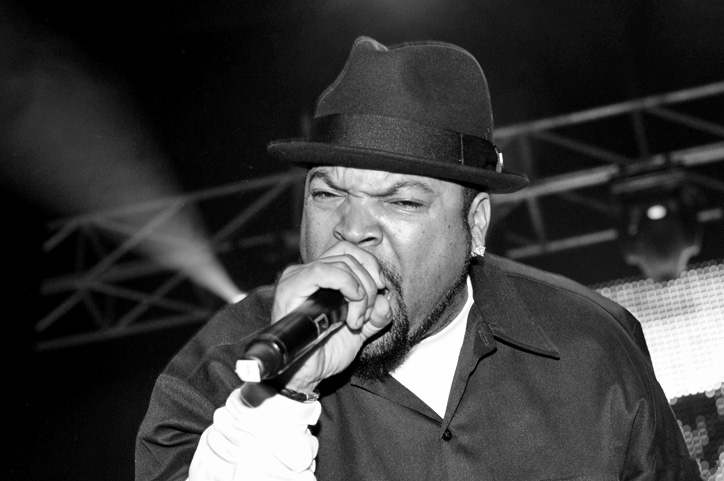
Ice Cube performing at Metro City Concert Club in October 2010

On September 28, 2010, his ninth solo album, I Am the West, arrived with, Cube says, a direction different from any one of his other albums. Its producers include West Coast veterans like DJ Quik, Dr. Dre, E-A-Ski, and, after nearly 20 years, again Cube's onetime C.I.A groupmate Sir Jinx. Offering the single "I Rep That West", the album debuted at No. 22 on the Billboard 200 and sold 22,000 copies in its first week. Also in 2010, Cube signed up-and-coming recording artist named 7Tre The Ghost, deemed likely to be either skipped or given the cookie-cutter treatment by most record companies.

In 2011, Cube featured on Daz Dillinger's song "Iz You Ready to Die" and on DJ Quik's song "Boogie Till You Conk Out".

In 2012, Ice Cube recorded a verse for a remix of the Insane Clown Posse song "Chris Benoit", from ICP's The Mighty Death Pop! album, appearing on the album Mike E. Clark's Extra Pop Emporium.

In September 2012, during Pepsi's NFL Anthems campaign, Cube released his second Raiders anthem "Come and Get It".

=== 2012–present: Everythang's Corrupt, Mount Westmore, Man Down and Man Up ===
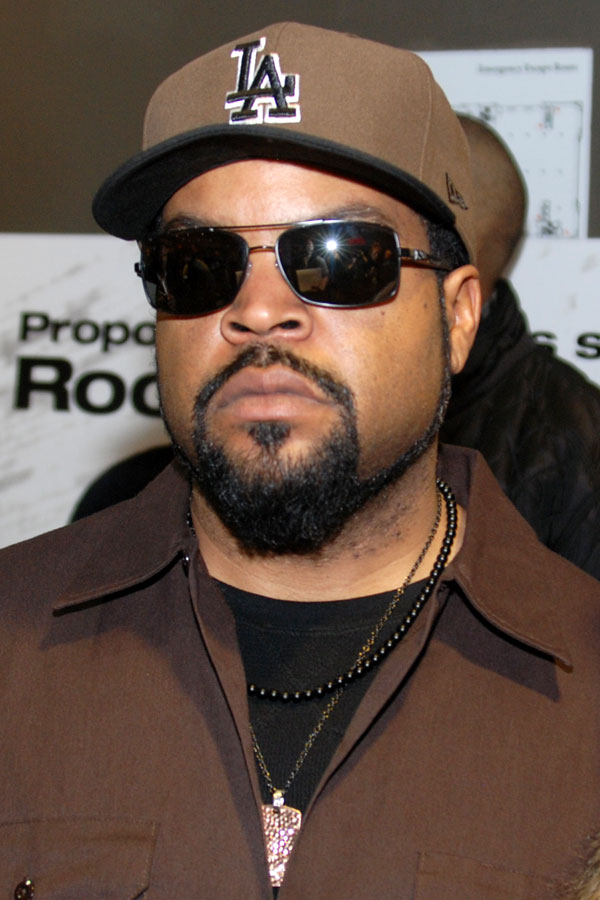
Ice Cube in 2014

In November 2012, Cube released more details on his forthcoming, tenth studio album, Everythang's Corrupt. Releasing its title track near the 2012 elections, he added, "You know, this record is for the political heads." But the album's release was delayed. On February 10, 2014, iTunes brought another single from it, "Sic Them Youngins on 'Em", and a music video followed the next day. Despite a couple of more song releases, the album's release was delayed even beyond Cube's work on the 2015 film Straight Outta Compton. After a statement setting release to 2017, the album finally arrived on December 7, 2018.

In 2014, Cube appeared on MC Ren's remix "Rebel Music", their first collaboration since the N.W.A reunion in 2000.

In 2020, Cube joined rappers Snoop Dogg, E-40, Too Short and formed the supergroup Mount Westmore. The group's debut album was released on June 7, 2022.

Throughout early 2024, Ice Cube toured across Canada as part of his Straight Into Canada tour.

Ice Cube's eleventh studio album and his first new album in six years, Man Down, was released on November 22, 2024. The album was preceded by the singles "It's My Ego", "Ego Maniacs (featuring Busta Rhymes and Killer Mike)" and "So Sensitive". On August 29, 2025, Ice Cube announced that his twelfth studio album, Man Up, would be released in 2025 and will be preceded by the first single "Before Hip Hop" on September 5, 2025.

== Film and television career ==
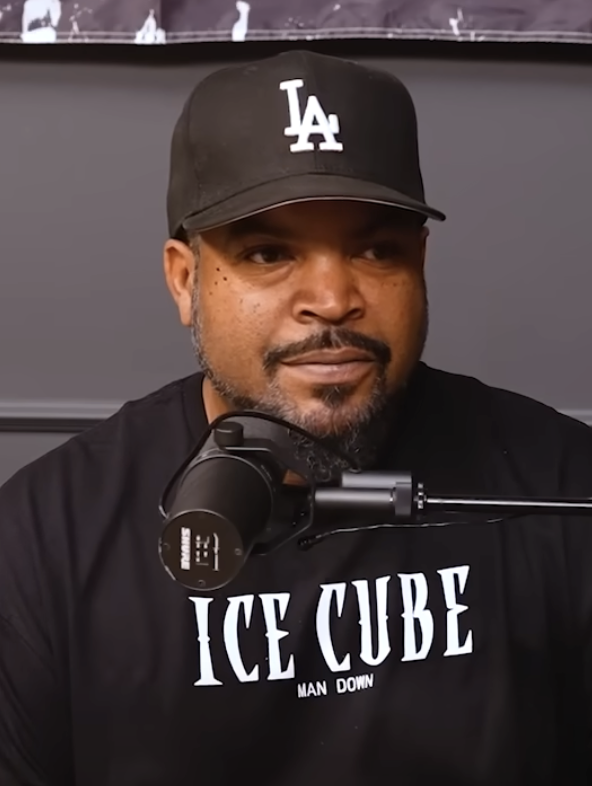
Ice Cube in 2024

Since 1991, Ice Cube has acted in nearly 40 films, several of which are highly regarded. Some of them, such as the 1992 thriller Trespass and the 1999 war comedy Three Kings, highlight action. Yet most are comedies, including a few adult-oriented ones, like the Friday franchise, whereas most of these are family-friendly, like the Barbershop franchise.

=== Narrative ===
John Singleton's seminal film Boyz n the Hood, released in July 1991, debuted the actor Ice Cube playing Doughboy, a persona that Cube played convincingly. Later, Cube starred with Ice-T and Bill Paxton in Walter Hill's 1992 thriller film Trespass, and in Charles Burnett's 1995 film The Glass Shield. Meanwhile, Cube declined to costar with Janet Jackson in Singleton's 1993 romance Poetic Justice, a role that Tupac Shakur then played.

Cube starred as the university student Fudge in Singleton's 1995 film Higher Learning. Singleton, encouraging Cube, had reportedly told him, "If you can write a record, you can write a movie." Cube cowrote the screenplay for the 1995 comedy Friday, based on adult themes, and starred in it with comedian Chris Tucker. Made with $3.5 million, Friday drew $28 million worldwide. Two sequels, Next Friday and Friday After Next, were respectively released in 2000 and 2002.

In 1997, playing a South African exiled to America who returns 15 years later, Cube starred in the action thriller Dangerous Ground, and had a supporting role in Anaconda. In 1998, writing again, the director Ice Cube debuted in The Players Club. In 1999, he starred alongside George Clooney and Mark Wahlberg as a staff sergeant in Three Kings, set in the immediate aftermath of the Gulf War, whereby the United States attacked Iraq in 1990, an "intelligent" war comedy critically acclaimed. In 2002, Cube starred in Kevin Bray's All About the Benjamins, and in Tim Story's comedy film Barbershop.

In 2004, Cube played in Barbershop 2 and Torque. The next year, he replaced Vin Diesel in the second installment of the XXX film series, XXX: State of the Union, as the main protagonist, in which he reprises the character in the third installment and reunited with Diesel 12 years later, XXX: Return of Xander Cage. He also appeared in the family comedy Are We There Yet?, which premised his role in its 2007 sequel Are We Done Yet?. In 2012, Cube appeared in 21 Jump Street. He also appeared in its sequel, 22 Jump Street, in 2014. That year, and then to return in 2016, he played alongside comedian Kevin Hart in two more Tim Story films, Ride Along and Ride Along 2. Also in 2016, Cube returned for the third entry in the Barbershop series. And in 2017, Cube starred with Charlie Day in the comedy Fist Fight.

In October 2021, Ice Cube was set to star in the comedy film Oh Hell No (now titled Stepdude) alongside Jack Black, but left the project after refusing to get vaccinated for COVID-19. The project would have paid him $9 million.

=== Documentary ===
In late 2005, Ice Cube and R. J. Cutler co-created the six-part documentary series Black. White., carried by cable network FX.

Ice Cube and basketball star LeBron James paired up to pitch a one-hour special to ABC based on James's life.

On May 11, 2010, ESPN aired Cube's directed documentary Straight Outta L.A., examining the interplay of Los Angeles sociopolitics, hip-hop, and the Raiders during the 1980s into the 1990s.

=== Serial television ===
Ice Cube's Are We There Yet? series premiered on TBS on June 2, 2010. It revolves around a family adjusting to the matriarch's new husband, played by Terry Crews. On August 16, the show was renewed for 90 more episodes, amounting to six seasons. Cube also credits Tyler Perry for his entrée to TBS. In front of the television cameras, rather, Cube appeared with Elmo as a 2014 guest on the PBS children's show Sesame Street.

== Personal life ==
In 1990, a musical associate in the rap group Public Enemy introduced Cube to the Nation of Islam (NOI). He converted to Islam, though he denied membership in the NOI. However, he readily adopted the group's ideology of black nationalism, a concept familiar to the hip-hop community. He nevertheless has claimed to listen to his own conscience as a "natural Muslim", claiming to do so because "it's just [him] and God". In 2012, he expressed support for same-sex marriage. In 2017, he said that he thinks "religion is stupid" in part and explained, "I'm gonna live a long life, and I might change religions three or four times before I die. I'm on the Islam tip—but I'm on the Christian tip, too. I'm on the Buddhist tip as well. Everyone has something to offer to the world."

Ice Cube has been married to Kimberly Woodruff since April 26, 1992. They have four children together; their oldest son O'Shea Jackson Jr. (born 1991) portrayed him in the film Straight Outta Compton. When asked about the balance between his music and parenting in 2005, Cube discussed teaching his children to question the value of violence depicted in all media, not just song lyrics. Through his son O'Shea Jackson Jr., Ice Cube became a grandfather in August 2017.

In 2017, he launched Big3, a 3-on-3 basketball league starring former NBA players. Ice Cube is a notable fan of the Las Vegas Raiders, originally supporting the team during their tenure in Los Angeles from 1982 to 1994. N.W.A's use of Raiders' memorabilia in conjunction with the team's historically intimidating presence, helped to further popularize an image for the team in hip-hop culture for years to come. Ice Cube is also a fan of the Los Angeles Dodgers of MLB, performing a pregame show before game 2 of the 2024 World Series and later at the team's World Series win celebration at Dodger Stadium, and has equally been a devout fan of the Los Angeles Lakers.

=== Accusations of antisemitism ===
At a 1991 press conference promoting his album Death Certificate, Cube endorsed the Nation of Islam's pseudo-scholarly book The Secret Relationship Between Blacks and Jews, which falsely claims that European Jews dominated the Atlantic slave trade. Death Certificate also contains the song "No Vaseline", which uses racial slurs against the other former members of N.W.A and refers to the group's manager Jerry Heller as "white man", "white boy", "Jew", "white Jew", "devil" and "cracker".

In response to accusations of racism and antisemitism, Cube said in 2008, "I ain't got time to be fuckin' antisemitic, anti-this, anti-that, anti-Korean. I ain't got time for that shit. I'm too busy bein' pro-black, you know what I'm saying?" In 2015, Cube expressed regret at including the word "Jew" in the lyrics of "No Vaseline" and explained that he intended to attack only Heller and not "the whole Jewish race".

In 2020, Marlow Stern wrote an article in the Daily Beast addressing Cube's "long, disturbing history" of antisemitism. The article was a response to Cube's day-long Twitter posting spree the day before, during which he promoted Nation of Islam leader Louis Farrakhan. He also shared various disproven antisemitic conspiracy theories. Again calling himself "just pro-black" and not "anti-anybody", he dismissed "the hype" and professed that he was just "telling [his] truth".

== Discography ==
Solo studio albums

- AmeriKKKa's Most Wanted (1990)
- Kill at Will (1990) (Note: Released as a studio EP/mini-album.)
- Death Certificate (1991)
- The Predator (1992)
- Lethal Injection (1993)
- War & Peace, Vol. 1 (The War Disc) (1998)
- War & Peace, Vol. 2 (The Peace Disc) (2000)
- Laugh Now, Cry Later (2006)
- Raw Footage (2008)
- I Am the West (2010)
- Everythang's Corrupt (2018)
- Man Down (2024)
- Man Up (2025)

Collaborative studio albums

- Straight Outta Compton (with N.W.A) (1989)
- Bow Down (with Westside Connection) (1996)
- Terrorist Threats (with Westside Connection) (2003)
- Snoop Cube 40 $hort (with Mount Westmore) (2022)

== Filmography ==
=== Films ===
Year	Film	Functioned as				Role
Year	Film	Director	Producer	Screenwriter	Actor	Role
1991	Boyz n the Hood	No	No	No	Yes	Darin "Doughboy" Baker
1992	Trespass	No	No	No	Yes	Savon
1993	CB4	No	No	No	Yes	Himself (cameo)
1994	The Glass Shield	No	No	No	Yes	Teddy Woods
1995	Higher Learning	No	No	No	Yes	Fudge
1995	Friday	No	Yes	Yes	Yes	Craig Jones
1997	Dangerous Ground	No	Yes	No	Yes	Vusi Madlazi
1997	Anaconda	No	No	No	Yes	Danny Rich
1998	The Players Club	Yes	Yes	Yes	Yes	Reggie
1998	I Got the Hook Up	No	No	No	Yes	Gun runner
1999	Three Kings	No	No	No	Yes	Sgt. Chief Elgin
1999	Thicker Than Water	No	No	No	Yes	Slink
2000	Next Friday	No	Yes	Yes	Yes	Craig Jones
2001	Ghosts of Mars	No	No	No	Yes	James 'Desolation' Williams
2002	All About the Benjamins	No	Yes	Yes	Yes	Bucum
2002	Barbershop	No	No	No	Yes	Calvin Palmer
2002	Friday After Next	No	Yes	Yes	Yes	Craig Jones
2004	Torque	No	No	No	Yes	Trey Wallace
2004	The N-Word	No	No	No	Yes	Himself
2004	Barbershop 2: Back in Business	No	Yes	No	Yes	Calvin Palmer
2005	Are We There Yet?	No	Yes	No	Yes	Nick Persons
2005	Beauty Shop	No	Yes	No	No	N/A
2005	Sierra Leone's Refugee All Stars	No	Yes	No	No	N/A
2005	XXX: State of the Union	No	No	No	Yes	Darius Stone / XXX
2007	Are We Done Yet?	No	Yes	No	Yes	Nick Persons
2008	First Sunday	No	Yes	No	Yes	Durell Washington
2008	Drillbit Taylor	No	No	No	Yes	Himself; Archive footage
2008	The Longshots	No	Yes	No	Yes	Curtis Plummer
2009	Janky Promoters	No	Yes	Yes	Yes	Russell Redds
2010	Lottery Ticket	No	Yes	No	Yes	Jerome "Thump" Washington
2011	Rampart	No	No	No	Yes	Kyle Timkins
2012	21 Jump Street	No	No	No	Yes	Capt. Dickson
2014	Ride Along	No	Yes	No	Yes	Detective James Payton
2014	22 Jump Street	No	No	No	Yes	Capt. Dickson
2014	The Book of Life	No	No	No	Yes	The Candle Maker (voice)
2015	Straight Outta Compton	No	Yes	No	No	N/A
2016	Ride Along 2	No	Yes	No	Yes	Detective James Payton
2016	Barbershop: The Next Cut	No	Yes	No	Yes	Calvin Palmer
2017	XXX: Return of Xander Cage	No	No	No	Yes	Darius Stone / XXX
2017	Fist Fight	No	No	No	Yes	Strickland
2020	The High Note	No	No	No	Yes	Jack Robertson
2023	Teenage Mutant Ninja Turtles: Mutant Mayhem	No	No	No	Yes	Superfly (voice)
2025	War of the Worlds	No	No	No	Yes	Will Radford
2025	Anaconda	No	No	No	Yes	Himself
TBA	Ride Along 3	No	Yes	No	Yes	James Peyton

=== Television ===
Year	Film	Functioned as				Role	Notes
Year	Film	Producer	Screenwriter	Director	Actor	Role	Notes
1994	The Sinbad Show	No	No	No	Yes	Himself	Episode: "The Mr. Science Show"
1997	The Jamie Foxx Show	No	No	No	Yes	Westside Connection	Episode: "Westside"
2002	The Bernie Mac Show	No	No	No	Yes	Himself	Episode: "Goodbye Dolly"
2005	BarberShop: The Series	Yes	No	No	No		
2005	WrestleMania 21	No	No	No	Yes	Himself	
2006	Black. White.	Yes	No	No	No		
2007	Friday: The Animated Series	Yes	Yes	No	No		
2010	30 for 30	No	No	Yes	No		Episode: "Straight Outta L.A."
2010–2013	Are We There Yet?	Yes	No	No	Yes	Terrence Kingston	Recurring role (20 episodes)
2017	The Defiant Ones	No	No	No	Yes	Himself	Documentary
2025	The Studio	No	No	No	Yes	Himself	Episode: "Casting"

=== Video games ===
Year	Title	Role	Other notes	Ref.
2010	Call of Duty: Black Ops	Chief Petty Officer Joseph Bowman / SOG multiplayer announcer	Voice and likeness actor	

== Tours ==
- Steady Mobbin' Tour (1992)
- The Predator Tour (1993)
- Family Values Tour 1998 (1998)
- Up in Smoke Tour (2000)
- Raw Footage Tour (2008)
- I Am the West Tour (2011)
- Truth to Power: 4 Decades of Attitude Tour (2025)

== Awards and nominations ==
=== Film awards ===
Ice Cube has received nominations for several films in the past. To date, he has won three awards:

- 2000: Blockbuster Entertainment Award: Favorite Action Team (for Three Kings)
- 2002: MECCA Movie Award: Acting Award
- 2026: Golden Raspberry Award: Worst Actor (for War of the Worlds)

=== VH1 Hip Hop Honors ===
Year	Nominee / work	Award	Result
2006	Himself	Honoree	Won

=== BET Hip-Hop Awards ===
Year	Nominee / work	Award	Result
2009	Himself	I Am Hip Hop award	Won

=== The BET Honors ===
Year	Nominee / work	Award	Result
2014	Himself	Entertainer Award	Won

=== Grammy Awards ===
Year	Nominee / work	Award	Result
2024	Himself (as a member of N.W.A.)	Grammy Lifetime Achievement Award	Won

=== Other ===
- Hollywood Walk of Fame Star 2017
- The Rock and Roll Hall of Fame Member of N.W.A. 2016
- Naismith Memorial Basketball Hall of Fame Ice Cube Impact Award 2023
