= You Know How We Do It =

1994 single by Ice Cube

Single by Ice Cube

from the album Lethal Injection
- Released: 1994
- Recorded: 1993
- Genre: West Coast hip-hop; G-funk
- Length: 3:52
- Label: Lench Mob; Priority
- Songwriters: O'Shea Jackson; Quincy Jones III; Dexter Wansel; Theodore Life Jr.
- Producer: QDIII

Ice Cube singles chronology
| "Really Doe" (1993) | "You Know How We Do It" (1994) | "Bop Gun (One Nation)" (1994) |

Music video
- "You Know How We Do It" on YouTube

"You Know How We Do It" is a song by American rapper, actor and filmmaker Ice Cube, released as the second single from his fourth studio album, Lethal Injection (1993). The song was released in 1994 by Lench Mob and Priority Records, and peaked at No. 30 and 46 on the US Billboard Hot 100 and Cash Box Top 100 charts. Its music video was directed by Marcus Raboy and filmed in Las Vegas. Musically, the song is in the G-funk genre, "You Know How We Do It" samples "The Show Is Over" by Evelyn "Champagne" King, "Summer Madness" by Kool & the Gang, and "Billie Jean" by Michael Jackson.

== Critical reception ==
Larry Flick from Billboard magazine wrote, "Latest single from Cube's current album, Lethal Injection, is a laid-back jam in which he traces what life in his old neighborhood has become. Follow-up to 'Really Doe' has the juice to easily sate the tastes of purists, but is also smooth enough to make considerable noise at pop and urban radio." Everett True from Melody Maker said, "This is more of that gorgeously smooth East Side/West Side funk that surely even the most staid of you are spending all your waking hours with by now, with sequenced vocals, gentle scratchin', a mutha of a rhythm track and a vocal as drop-dead-and-f***-me-as-you-fall cool as you'd ever want." Alan Jones from Music Week gave it three out of five, describing it as "another mellow musical experience, [with] his assured and rhythmic rap being intoned over a relaxing backwash enlivened by a squirting synth. Some dubious lyrics, but a nice summery track which deserves to score."

Pan-European magazine Music & Media wrote, "There's a thin line between hip hop and soul drawn here. Vocally he's moving away from straightforward rapping to almost singing the lyrics. Will that be next year's fashion?" Paul Moody from NME named it Big Funky Single of the Week, adding, "A deep, oven-baked rhythm, a sample stolen from the wonderful 'The Show Is Over' by Evelyn Champagne King and then Ice himself, grumbling about how ...They wanna have me in stripes, like Dennis the Menace and mumbling incoherently about the 'West Side'. [...] A funk record for people scared to funk and a rap record for people who... yeah, yeah, you know. A monster hit." Tim Jeffery from the Record Mirror Dance Update wrote, "A cool and lazy groove with lightly wailing vocals provide an excellent backdrop for Ice Cube's laconic rapping style. Not dancefloor material but this evokes a great atmosphere." James Hamilton described it as "Evelyn King sampling pleasant jazz-funkily rolling 92.7bpm mellow LA rap" in his weekly Record Mirror dance column.

== Music video ==
The accompanying music video for "You Know How We Do It" was directed by American film and music video director Marcus Raboy and filmed in Las Vegas, Nevada. It features Ice Cube and his crew taking a trip to Las Vegas in a convertible Jaguar XJS and gambling in several Vegas Casinos. The video won an award in the category for Rap at the 1994 Music Video Production Awards in Los Angeles.

== In popular culture ==
Mariah Carey sampled "You Know How We Do It" in her song "Irresistible (West Side Connection)" from her 2002 album Charmbracelet; it features Ice Cube as part of the hip hop supergroup the Westside Connection, which also included Mack 10 and WC. The song was also featured in the film Sonic the Hedgehog 2 and Grand Theft Auto V.

== Track listing ==
1. "You Know How We Do It"
2. "You Know How We Do It (Instrumental)"
3. "2 n the Morning"
4. "2 n the Morning (Instrumental)"

== Charts ==
| Chart (1994) | Peak position |
|---|---|
| Australia (ARIA) | 102 |
| UK Singles (OCC) | 41 |
| UK Dance (Music Week) | 11 |
| UK Club Chart (Music Week) | 48 |
| US Billboard Hot 100 | 30 |
| US Dance Singles Sales (Billboard) | 16 |
| US Hot R&B/Hip-Hop Songs (Billboard) | 21 |
| US Hot Rap Songs (Billboard) | 5 |
| US Cash Box Top 100 | 46 |

== Certifications ==
| Region | Certification | Certified units/sales |
|---|---|---|
| Denmark (IFPI Danmark) | Gold | 45,000^{‡} |
| New Zealand (RMNZ) | 2× Platinum | 60,000^{‡} |
| United Kingdom (BPI) | Gold | 400,000^{‡} |
^{‡} Sales+streaming figures based on certification alone.
