= The Predator (album) =

Studio album by Ice Cube
- Released: November 17, 1992
- Recorded: 1991–1992
- Studios: Echo Sound (Glendale, California); The Hit Factory (New York City)
- Genres: West Coast hip-hop; gangsta rap; G-funk; hardcore hip hop; political hip hop
- Length: 56:27
- Label: Priority
- Producers: Ice Cube; DJ Pooh; Sir Jinx; Torcha Chamba; DJ Muggs

Ice Cube chronology
Death Certificate (1991)	The Predator (1992)	Lethal Injection (1993)

Singles from The Predator
- 1. "Wicked" Released: November 3, 1992; 2. "It Was a Good Day" Released: February 23, 1993; 3. "Check Yo Self" Released: July 13, 1993

The Predator is the third studio album by American rapper Ice Cube, released on November 17, 1992, through Priority Records. The album was released within months of the 1992 Los Angeles riots; many songs comment on racial tensions in the United States. The album was produced by DJ Pooh, Sir Jinx, Torcha Chamba, and DJ Muggs. The title is in part a reference to the movie Predator 2, and the album includes samples from the film.

The Predator was supported by three singles: "It Was a Good Day", "Check Yo Self" and "Wicked". The album received generally positive reviews from critics and was also a commercial success. It debuted at number one on the Billboard 200 chart, selling 193,000 copies in its first week. The album was certified double platinum by the Recording Industry Association of America (RIAA) in November 2001.

== Singles ==
The album spawned three hit singles: "It Was a Good Day", which was a hit in March 1993; "Check Yo Self"; and "Wicked". Both the album and single version of "Check Yo Self" include an appearance from Das EFX, with the latter's single featuring a remix utilizing a sample of Grandmaster Flash's "The Message".

== Critical reception ==
Professional ratings
Review scores
Source	Rating
AllMusic	4/5 stars
The Austin Chronicle	4/5 stars
Chicago Sun-Times	3/4 stars
Entertainment Weekly	A−
Los Angeles Times	3/4 stars
Q	4/5 stars
Rolling Stone	2.5/5 stars
The Rolling Stone Album Guide	3.5/5 stars
Select	3/5
Uncut	5/5 stars

Although not as lauded as his previous efforts, The Predator was well received. Entertainment Weekly called it "Ice Cube's strongest, most cohesive work yet". Spin called it a record that "demands to be heard" (1/93, p. 61). Q included it in its "90 Best Albums of the 1990s" (12/99, p. 74).

== Commercial performance ==
The Predator debuted at number one on the Billboard 200 chart, selling 193,000 copies in its first week. This became Ice Cube's first US number one debut. On November 16, 2001, the album was certified double platinum by the Recording Industry Association of America (RIAA) for sales of over two million copies. As of January 2003, the album has sold 2.2 million copies in the United States, according to Nielsen SoundScan.

== Legacy ==
The album was included in the book 1001 Albums You Must Hear Before You Die.

== Track listing ==
No.	Title	Writer(s)	Producer(s)	Length
1.	"The First Day of School (Intro)"	O'Shea Jackson	Ice Cube	1:20
2.	"When Will They Shoot?"	Jackson; Brian May	DJ Pooh; Bob Cat; Ice Cube	4:36
3.	"I'm Scared (Insert)"	Jackson	Ice Cube	1:32
4.	"Wicked" (featuring Don Jagwarr)	Jackson; Sylvester Stewart; Walter Morrison; Marshall Jones; Leroy Bonner; Andrew Noland; Marvin Pierce; Ralph Middlebrooks; Gregory Webster; Norman Napier; Duane Earle	Torcha Chamba; Ice Cube	3:55
5.	"Now I Gotta Wet 'Cha"	Jackson; Allen Toussaint; George Clinton; William Collins; Bernie Worrell	DJ Muggs	4:03
6.	"The Predator"	Jackson; Mark Jordan	DJ Pooh	4:03
7.	"It Was a Good Day"	Jackson; Ronald Isley; Ernie Isley; Chris Jasper; Rudolph Isley; Marvin Isley; O'Kelly Isley	DJ Pooh	4:19
8.	"We Had to Tear This Mothafucka Up"	Jackson; Larry Muggerud; Duke Jordan	DJ Muggs	4:23
9.	"Fuck 'Em (Insert)"	Jackson; Anthony Wheaton	Sir Jinx	2:02
10.	"Dirty Mack"	Jackson; Clinton; Worrell; Collins; Garry Shider	Mr. Woody	4:34
11.	"Don't Trust 'Em"	Jackson; Donald Fagen; Walter Becker	Rashad; Ice Cube; DJ Pooh	4:06
12.	"Gangsta's Fairytale 2" (featuring Lil Russ)	Jackson; Stewart; Clinton; Worrell; Collins; Janice Johnson; Perry Kibble	Pocketts; Ice Cube	3:19
13.	"Check Yo Self" (featuring Das EFX)	Jackson; Melvin Glover; Sylvia Robinson; Edward Fletcher; Clifton Chase	DJ Muggs; Ice Cube	3:42
14.	"Who Got the Camera?"	Jackson; Clarence Haskins	Sir Jinx	4:37
15.	"Integration (Insert)"	Jackson	Ice Cube	2:31
16.	"Say Hi to the Bad Guy"	Jackson; Stewart; Collins; Worrell; Clinton	Sir Jinx	3:19

2003 reissue bonus tracks
No.	Title	Producer(s)	Length
17.	"Check Yo Self" ('The Message' Remix; featuring Das EFX)	Ice Cube; DJ Pooh	3:54
18.	"It Was a Good Day" (Remix)	Ice Cube	4:28
19.	"24 Wit an L"	Ice Cube	3:25
20.	"U Ain't Gonna Take My Life"	Mr. Woody	4:07

== Charts ==
=== Weekly charts ===
Chart (1992)	Peak position
Australian Albums (ARIA Charts)	72
Canadian Albums (Billboard)	61
Dutch Albums (Album Top 100)	56
UK Albums (Official Charts)	73
US Billboard 200	1
US Top R&B/Hip-Hop Albums (Billboard)	1

=== Year-end charts ===
Chart (1993)	Position
US Billboard 200	24
US Top R&B/Hip-Hop Albums (Billboard)	8

== Certifications ==
Region	Certification	Certified units/sales
New Zealand (RMNZ)	Gold	7,500^{‡}
United Kingdom (BPI)	Silver	60,000^{^}
United States (RIAA)	2× Platinum	2,000,000^{^}
^{^} Shipments figures based on certification alone.^{‡} Sales+streaming figures based on certification alone.

== See also ==
- List of number-one albums of 1992 (U.S.)
- List of number-one R&B albums of 1992 (U.S.)
