= Bop Gun (One Nation) =

1994 single by Ice Cube

Single by Ice Cube featuring George Clinton

from the album Lethal Injection
- Released: July 12, 1994
- Recorded: 1993
- Genre: G-funk
- Length: 3:42 (single version); 5:18 (video version); 11:05 (album version)
- Label: Lench Mob; Priority
- Songwriters: O'Shea Jackson; George Clinton
- Producer: QDIII

Ice Cube singles chronology
"You Know How We Do It" (1994)	"Bop Gun (One Nation)" (1994)	"Natural Born Killaz" (1994)

Music video
- "Bop Gun (One Nation)" on YouTube

"Bop Gun (One Nation)" is the third single from American rapper, actor and filmmaker Ice Cube's fourth album, Lethal Injection (1993). The song samples the Funkadelic song "One Nation Under a Groove". It reached number six on the US Billboard Hot Rap Singles chart, number 23 on the Billboard Pop Singles chart and number 40 on the Cash Box Top 100. The song features lyrics from Tom Tom Club's hit "Genius of Love." It was included on Ice Cube's Greatest Hits album and on the 1996 George Clinton remix album Greatest Funkin' Hits. "Bop Gun (One Nation)" was mixed at Aire LA Studios in Glendale, CA by Raymundo Silva.

The version of "Bop Gun (One Nation)" featured on Lethal Injection is about 11 minutes, while the radio edit clocks in at under four minutes. The radio edit also features slightly different lyrics sung by Ice Cube, such as the replacement of certain expletives, so as to make it more suitable for radio play.

== Background ==
The term "Bop Gun" was invented and popularized by George Clinton's band Parliament in the 1977 song "Bop Gun (Endangered Species)". It is "shot" at the funkless people and fills their heart with funk and enlightenment from false ideology. (George Clinton's Funkcyclopedia)

== Critical reception ==
A reviewer from the British Record Mirror Dance Update gave "Bop Gun (One Nation)" three out of five and named it a "worthy rendition".

== Music video ==
The accompanying music video for the single portrays a crazy houseparty at George Clinton's, was directed by Cameron Casey and also features Bootsy Collins and WC. In the ending, the music stops with a fadeout and we can finally catch George Clinton holding the Bop Gun.

== Charts ==
=== Weekly charts ===
Chart (1994)	Peak position
Australia (ARIA)	93
UK Singles (OCC)	22
UK Dance (OCC)	12
UK Dance (Music Week)	12
UK Club Chart (Music Week)	55
US Billboard Hot 100	23
US Hot Dance Music/Maxi-Singles Sales (Billboard)	8
US Hot R&B/Hip-Hop Songs (Billboard)	21
US Hot Rap Songs (Billboard)	6
US Rhythmic Airplay (Billboard)	9
US Cash Box Top 100	40

=== Year-end charts ===
Year-end chart (1994)	Position
US Billboard Hot 100	99
US Maxi-Singles Sales (Billboard)	29

== Certifications ==
Region	Certification	Certified units/sales
United States (RIAA)	Gold	500,000^{^}
^{^} Shipments figures based on certification alone.
