= Lethal Injection (album) =

Studio album by Ice Cube
- Released: December 7, 1993
- Studios: Echo Sound; Skip Saylor; Westlake; (Los Angeles, California)
- Genres: West Coast hip-hop; gangsta rap; G-funk
- Length: 56:20
- Label: Priority
- Producers: QDIII; Madness 4 Real; Sir Jinx; Laylaw; Ice Cube; D'Maq

Ice Cube chronology
The Predator (1992)	Lethal Injection (1993)	Bootlegs & B-Sides (1994)

Singles from Lethal Injection
- 1. "Really Doe" Released: October 12, 1993; 2. "You Know How We Do It" Released: February 2, 1994; 3. "Bop Gun (One Nation)" Released: July 12, 1994

Professional ratings
Review scores
Source	Rating
AllMusic	2/5 stars
The Austin Chronicle	3.5/5 stars
Christgau's Consumer Guide	(dud)
Entertainment Weekly	B
Los Angeles Times	3/4 stars
Music Week	3/5 stars
RapReviews	7.5/10
Rolling Stone	2/5 stars
The Rolling Stone Album Guide	3.5/5 stars
The Source	3.5/5 stars

Lethal Injection is the fourth studio album by American rapper Ice Cube. It was released on December 7, 1993, through Priority Records. The album was produced by QDIII, Madness 4 Real, Sir Jinx, Laylaw, D'Mag, and Ice Cube.

Lethal Injection was supported by three singles: "Really Doe", "You Know How We Do It", and the Funkadelic-sampling "Bop Gun (One Nation)", which became a staple on MTV. The track "Down for Whatever" also gained popularity after featuring in the 1999 film Office Space. The album received generally positive reviews from critics and was a commercial success similar to the rapper's previous albums. The album debuted at number five on the US Billboard 200, selling 215,000 copies in its first week.

== Criticism ==
The album was criticized for what many saw as Ice Cube's pandering to gangsta rap, and for lyrics which were considered anti-police, racist, and misogynistic, as well as toning down the sociopolitical content found on his earlier efforts. The album's standing has increased over time.

== Commercial performance ==
Lethal Injection debuted at number five on the US Billboard 200 chart, selling 215,000 copies in its first week. This became Ice Cube's third US top-ten album. The album also debuted at number one on the US Top R&B/Hip-Hop Albums chart. On February 1, 1994, the album was certified platinum by the Recording Industry Association of America (RIAA) for sales of over a million copies in the United States.

== Track listing ==
No.	Title	Writer(s)	Producer(s)	Length
1.	"The Shot (Intro)"	O'Shea Jackson	Sir Jinx	0:55
2.	"Really Doe"	Jackson; Derrick McDowell; Larry Goodman; Gregory Jacobs; George Clinton; William Collins; Walter Morrison; Norman Whitfield	Derrick McDowell; Laylaw	4:28
3.	"Ghetto Bird"	Jackson; Clinton; Collins; Bernie Worrell; Garry Shider; David Spradley; Delight Jones	QDIII	3:50
4.	"You Know How We Do It"	Jackson; Jones; Dexter Wansel; Theodore Life	QDIII	3:52
5.	"Cave Bitch"	Jackson; Brian Gallow	Brian G	4:18
6.	"Bop Gun (One Nation)" (featuring George Clinton)	Jackson; Jones; Clinton; Collins; Morrison; Shider	Ice Cube; QDIII	11:17
7.	"What Can I Do?"	Jackson; Leon Ware; Arthur Ross; Victor Taylor; Mychal Simmons	88 X Unit	4:39
8.	"Lil Ass Gee"	Jackson; Anthony Wheaton	Sir Jinx	4:04
9.	"Make It Ruff, Make It Smooth" (featuring K-Dee)	Jackson; Jones; Leo Johnson	QDIII	4:23
10.	"Down for Whatever"	Jackson; Morrison; Marshall Jones; Leroy Bonner; Gregory Webster; Andrew Noland; Ralph Middlebrooks; Marvin Pierce; Norman Napier; Jesper Dahl; Rasmus Berg; Nicholas Kvaran; Lasse Bavngaard	Madness 4 Real	4:40
11.	"Enemy"	Jackson; Dahl; Berg; Kvaran; Bavngaard	Madness 4 Real	4:50
12.	"When I Get to Heaven"	Jackson; Gallow; Marvin Gaye; Renaldo Benson; Al Cleveland; James Nyx	Brian G	5:04

2003 reissue bonus tracks
No.	Title	Producer(s)	Length
13.	"What Can I Do? (Westside remix)" (featuring Mack 10)	D'Maq; Lay Law	4:27
14.	"What Can I Do? (Eastside remix)"	Ali Shaheed Muhammad	4:46
15.	"You Know How We Do It (remix)"	Ice Cube	4:23
16.	"Lil Ass Gee (Eerie Gumbo remix)"	N.O. Joe	5:21

== Singles ==
"Really Doe"

- Released: 1993
- B-side: "My Skin Is My Sin"

"You Know How We Do It"

- Released: February 1994
- B-side: "2 'n the Morning"

"Bop Gun (One Nation)"

- Released: August 1994
- B-side: "Down for Whatever"

== Charts ==
=== Weekly charts ===
Chart (1993–1994)	Peak position
Australian Albums (ARIA)	49
Canadian Albums (Billboard)	34
Dutch Albums (Album Top 100)	89
UK Albums (Official Charts)	52
US Billboard 200	5
US Top R&B/Hip-Hop Albums (Billboard)	1

=== Year-end charts ===
Chart (1994)	Position
US Billboard 200	43
US Top R&B/Hip-Hop Albums (Billboard)	7

== Certifications ==
Certifications for "Lethal Injection"
Region	Certification	Certified units/sales
New Zealand (RMNZ)	Gold	7,500^{‡}
United States (RIAA)	Platinum	1,000,000^{^}
^{^} Shipments figures based on certification alone.^{‡} Sales+streaming figures based on certification alone.

== See also ==
- List of number-one albums of 1993 (U.S.)
