= Kurupt discography =

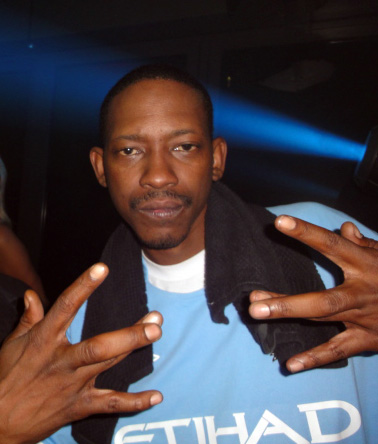
- Studio albums: 6
- Extended plays: 2
- Compilation albums: 3
- Singles: 7
- Collaborations: 5

American rapper Kurupt has released six studio albums, three compilation albums, one EP and seven singles. Since his debut in 1998 he has released through a number of labels, Including Antra, Death Row and Universal. He is a close associate of Daz Dillinger (as one half of Tha Dogg Pound), Snoop Dogg and Dr. Dre.

Born Ricardo Brown in Philadelphia, he moved to Los Angeles to join Death Row Records. As a recording artist he made his debut on Dr. Dre's The Chronic in 1992. He continued to make a number other guest appearances, including Snoop Dogg's Doggystyle the year after. The collaborative record Dogg Food brought further into the limelight and Brown made his solo debut on the double-album Kuruption! on A&M Records. Released in October 1998, one disc of the album was dedicated to the West Coast and the other to the East Coast. It reached No. 8 in the Billboard 200, the highest position he would attain in his career.

His subsequent albums had moderate success, with Space Boogie: Smoke Oddessey reaching No. 10 in the Billboard 200. In 2004 he returned to Death Row for Against tha Grain and has since released records through different outlets. Throughout his career he has continued to make guest appearances for Snoop Dogg and affiliated acts.

== Albums ==
=== Studio albums ===
Year	Title	Chart positions						Notes
Year	Title	US	US R&B	US Rap	US Ind	AUS	FRA	Notes
1998	Kuruption!: Released: October 12, 1998; Label: Antra, A&M; Formats: CD, Cassette	8	4	x	—	—	x	
1999	Tha Streetz Iz a Mutha: Released: November 16, 1999; Label: Antra; Formats: CD, LP, Cassette, digital download	31	5	x	—	—	x	
2001	Space Boogie: Smoke Oddessey: Released: July 17, 2001; Label: Antra; Formats: CD, LP, Cassette, digital download	10	5	x	1	89	75	
2003	Against the Grain (Original Version): Released: 2003; Label: Dogg Pound Records, Triggerman Records; Formats: CD, digital download	—	—	—	—	—	—	
2005	Against the Grain: Released: August 23, 2005; Label: Death Row, Koch; Formats: CD, digital download	60	20	11	8	—	146	Reissued as Down and Dirty in February 2010 with a slightly altered tracklist
2006	Same Day, Different Shit: Released: June 20, 2006; Label: D.P.G.; Format: CD	—	59	—	—	—	x	
2010	Streetlights: Released: April 20, 2010; Label: Fontana, Universal, Penagon; Format: CD	183	38	19	37	—	x	
2026	Tales from My Hood: Released: July 31, 2026; Label: Death Row Records; Format: CD, Vinyl, digital download	—	—	—	—	—	x	
"—" denotes releases that did not chart. "x" denotes that chart did not exist at the time.

=== Collaborative albums ===
Year	Title	Chart positions			
Year	Title	US	US R&B	US Rap	US Ind
2003	The Horsemen Project (with The HRSMN): Released: 2003; Label: Think Differently, Proverbs; Format: CD	—	—	x	—
2007	Digital Smoke (with J. Wells): Released: June 5, 2007; Label: Bonzi, Fontana; Formats: CD, digital download	—	—	—	—
2008	The Frank and Jess Story (with Roscoe): Released: Label: High Powered; Formats: CD, digital download	—	82	—	—
2009	BlaQKout (with DJ Quik): Released: June 9, 2009; Label: Mad Science, Fontana; Format: CD	61	11	6	9
2009	Tha Tekneek Files (with Roscoe): Released: October 2, 2009; Label: All Day; Format: CD	—	—	—	—
2016	We Got Now and Next (with Diirty OGz): Released: 2016; Label: RBC Records; Format: CD	—	—	—	—
2021	The Last Ride (with The HRSMN): Released: June 18, 2021; Label: Fat Beats, Cre8yte Corporation; Format: CD, digital download, streaming	—	—	—	—
2022	Don't Be Stupid (with C-Mob): Released: December 16, 2022; Label: Fat Beats, Compound Interest; Format: CD, digital download, streaming	—	—	—	—
2026	The Godbody LP (with Rakim and Masta Killa): Released: September 18, 2026; Label: Holy Toledo Productions, DMG, Compound Interest; Format: CD, digital download, streaming	—	—	—	—
2026	"—" denotes releases that did not chart. "x" denotes that chart did not exist at the time.				

=== Compilation albums ===
Year	Title
2005	Kurupt's Greatest: Released: February 15, 2005; Label: Treacherous Records, Bungalo Records; Format: CD
2005	Originals: Released: March 15, 2005; Label: 101 Distribution; Format: CD
2011	Penagon Rydaz: Released: 2011; Label: Penagon Entertainment LLC; Formats: CD, digital download
2011	Terminal 3 Presents The Academy: Released: September 21, 2011; Label: Pentagon, Bonzi Records; Format: CD
2013	Confidential: Released: July 9, 2013; Label: OCF MUSIC; Format: Digital download
2022	7Ps Tha Gotti Way: Released: August 19, 2022; Label: Penagon, Fat Beats; Format: CD, Digital download, streaming

=== Instrumental albums ===
Year	Title
2009	Same Day Different Sh*t (Instrumental Album): Released: February 24, 2009; Label: Dogg Pound Online

=== Mixtapes ===
- Tha 420 Mixtape (2010)
- Money, Bitches, Power (2013)

== Extended plays ==
Year	Title
2007	Against tha Grain E.P.: Released: May 7, 2007; Label: Death Row, Koch
2023	Long Story Longer Presents Kurupt and Obie Trice (with Long Story Longer & Obie Trice): Released: November 3, 2023; Label: Long Story Longer LLC

== Singles ==
=== As lead artist ===
Year	Song	Chart positions		Album
Year	Song	US R&B	AUS	Album
1998	"Ride On/Caught Up" (with Snoop Dogg)			Caught Up (soundtrack)
1998	"We Can Freak It" (featuring Baby S & Andre Wilson)	89	—	Kuruption!
1999	"Girls All Pause" (featuring Nate Dogg and Roscoe)	62	—	Tha Streetz Iz a Mutha
2000	"Who Ride Wit Us" (featuring Daz Dillinger)	62	—	Tha Streetz Iz a Mutha
2000	"Welcome Home" (featuring LaToiya Williams)	—	—	Tha Streetz Iz a Mutha
2001	"Behind the Walls" (featuring Nate Dogg)			Oz (soundtrack)
2001	"It's Over" (featuring Natina Reed)	88	15	Space Boogie: Smoke Oddessey
2006	"I Get High"	—	—	Non-album single
2010	"I'm Burnt" (featuring Problem)	—	—	Streetlights
2010	"In Gotti We Trust" (featuring Xzibit)	—	—	Streetlights
2010	"Questions" (featuring Uncle Chucc)	—	—	Streetlights
2010	"Yessir"	—	—	Streetlights

=== As featured artist ===
List of singles, with selected chart positions and certifications, showing year released and album name
Title	Year	Peak chart positions									Certifications	Album
Title	Year	US	US R&B	US Rap	FRA	GER	IRE	NL	SWI	UK	Certifications	Album
"Check It Out" (B-Legit featuring Kurupt & E-40)	1996	—	—	—	—	—	—	—	—	—		The Hemp Museum
"Gangsta Gangsta! (How U Do It)" (Chris Webber featuring Kurupt)	1999	—	—	10	—	—	—	—	—	—		2 Much Drama
"Xxplosive" (Dr. Dre featuring Hittman, Kurupt, Nate Dogg and Six-Two)	1999	—	51	—	—	—	—	—	—	—	BPI: Silver; RMNZ: 2× Platinum	2001
"The Next Episode" (Dr. Dre featuring Snoop Dogg, Kurupt and Nate Dogg)	2000	23	11	9	22	34	11	26	34	3	BPI: Platinum	2001
"Where I Wanna Be" (Shade Sheist featuring Kurupt & Nate Dogg)	2000	—	—	—	—	—	—	—	—	—		Informal Introduction
"Skunk" (Choclair featuring Saukrates and Kurupt)	2002	—	—	—	—	—	—	—	—	—		Memoirs of Blake Savage
"Never Call Me" (Jhené Aiko featuring Kurupt)	2017	—	—	—	—	—	—	—	—	—		Trip
"Be Ill" (Rakim featuring Kurupt & Masta Killa)	2024	—	—	—	—	—	—	—	—	—		Reb7rth
"—" denotes releases that did not chart. "x" denotes that chart did not exist at the time.

=== Collaborative singles ===
Year	Song	Album
2007	"All We Smoke" (with J. Wells)	Digital Smoke

== Other certified songs ==
List of songs, with selected certifications, showing year released and album name
Title	Year	Certifications	Album
"Never Call Me" (Jhené Aiko featuring Kurupt)	2017	RIAA: Platinum	Trip

== Guest appearances ==
List of non-single guest appearances, with other performing artists, showing year released and album name
Title	Year	Other artist(s)	Album	
"Are You Ready"	1991	The S.O.S. Band	One of Many Nights	
"Someone I Can Love"	1991	The S.O.S. Band	One of Many Nights	
"Get Hyped on This"	1991	The S.O.S. Band	One of Many Nights	
"Lyrical Gangbang"	1992	The Lady of Rage, RBX	The Chronic	
"Stranded on Death Row"	1992	Bushwick Bill, RBX, The Lady of Rage, Snoop Doggy Dogg	The Chronic	
"Ain't No Fun (If the Homies Can't Have None)"	1993	Snoop Doggy Dogg, Nate Dogg, Warren G	Doggystyle	
"Check Out Time"	1996	2Pac, Natasha Walker, Big Syke	All Eyez on Me	
"Up Jump tha Boogie"	1996	Snoop Doggy Dogg, Charlie Wilson and Teena Marie	Tha Doggfather	
"Gold Rush"	1996	Snoop Doggy Dogg, Techniec, Bad Azz	Tha Doggfather	
"Loc'd Out Hood"	1997	—N/a	Gang Related (soundtrack)	
"Ice Age"	1998	Ras Kass, El Drex	Rasassination	
"Under Pressure"	1998	—N/a	The Players Club (soundtrack)	
"First We Pray"	1998	Nate Dogg, Isaac Reese	G-Funk Classics, Vols. 1 & 2	
"Dogg Pound Gangstaville"	1998	Nate Dogg, Snoop Dogg	G-Funk Classics, Vols. 1 & 2	
"Money, Houses and Cars"	1998	Bad Azz	Word on tha Streets	
"Massive Heat"	1998	Lord Tariq, Peter Gunz, Sticky Fingaz	Make It Reign	
"You Know My Steez" (Three Men and a Lady Remix)	1998	Guru, The Lady of Rage	Full Clip: A Decade of Gang Starr	
"Let's Get High"	1999	Hittman, Dr. Dre, Ms. Roq	2001	
"Housewife"	1999	Dr. Dre, Hittman	2001 / Tha Streetz Iz a Mutha!	
"G'z Iz G's (Remix)"	1999	Tash, Xzibit, Snoop Dogg	Non-album single	
"The War Iz On"	1999	Krayzie Bone, Snoop Dogg, Layzie Bone	Thug Mentality 1999	
"Dollaz Make Sense"	1999	Warren G	I Want It All	
"Gangsta Love"	1999	Warren G, Nate Dogg, RBX	I Want It All	
"Outlaws"	1999	Frost, King Tee	That Was Then, This Is Now, Vol. 1	
"We Get It Crunk"	1999	Cool Breeze	East Point's Greatest Hits	
"Fa Shiesty Cats"	1999	D.B.A., WC	Doing Business As	
"Ghetto Millionaire"	1999	C-Murder, Snoop Dogg, Nate Dogg	Bossaline	
"Rule No. 1"	1999	MC Breed, Pimp C	It's All Good	
"Mamacita"	1999	Frost, Soopafly, Don Cisco	Next Friday (soundtrack)	
"Baby I Remember Your Face"	1999	The Gap Band	Y2K: Funkin' Til 2000 Comz	
"Highlife" (Fredwreck Remix)	2000	Cypress Hill	—N/a	
"Gangsta Rap"	2000	Crooked I, Treach, Scarface	Too Gangsta for Radio	
"Big Bang Theory"	2000	Tha Eastsidaz, Xzibit, CPO, Pinky	Tha Eastsidaz	
"Take It Back to '85"	2000	Tha Eastsidaz, Butch Cassidy	Tha Eastsidaz	
"So High"	2000	The Click, E-40, D-Shot	Obstacles	
"One, Two"	2000	Everlast	Eat at Whitey's	
"Forth and Back"	2000	Slum Village	Fantastic, Vol. 2	
"I Will Survive"	2000	Snoop Dogg, Techniec, Kevin Vernado	Dead Man Walkin'	
"Fa Sho"	2000	Nocoast	Coastales	
"Gotz ta Fly"	2000	Big Arch	Strictly 4 the Streets	
"Oh Boy"	2000	Don Cisco, Roscoe	Oh Boy	
"The Dog in Me"	2000	Celly Cel	Deep Conversation	
"Radio"	2000	Phats Bossi	Big Momma's House (soundtrack)	
"Where the Gangstas At"	2000	B-Legit, Mack 10	Hempin' Ain't Easy	
"Blue Suits & Badges"	2000	T.W.D.Y., J-Dubb, Otis & Shug	Lead the Way	
"Kurupted Flesh"	2000	Flesh-N-Bone	5th Dog Let Loose	
"Horsementality"	2000	The Hrsmn	2000 B.C. (Before Can-I-Bus)	
"Kingpin and da Kockhound (Pass the Pussy)"	2001	Mr. Short Khop	Da Khop Shop	
"Promote Violins"	2001	Tha Alkaholiks	X.O. Experience	
"Gangsta, Gangsta"	2001	Beanie Sigel	The Reason	
"Money 2 Fold"	2001	Bad Azz, Snoop Dogg	Personal Business	
"Dogghouse In Your Mouth"	2001	Tha Eastsidaz, Suga Free, Soopafly, RBX, Ruff Dogg, King Lou, Mixmaster Spade	Duces 'n Trayz: The Old Fashioned Way	
"Can't Nobody"	2001	Nate Dogg	Music and Me	
"Jazzy Hoes, Pt. 2"	2001	Jermaine Dupri, Too Short, Field Mob	Instructions	
"My Projects" (Remix)	2001	Coo Coo Cal, Trick Daddy	—N/a	
"Talkin' the Talk"	2001	The Hrsmn	U Can't Fuck With the Canibus Man	
"Wild in da West"	2001	Chico & Coolwadda	Wild In Da West	
"That's Game"	2001	D-Shot	Money, Sex & Thugs	
"Baby I Gee"	2001	South Central Cartel	Gangsta Conversation	
"It'z On U"	2001	Sqeek Da Primadonna	PMS	
"It's Jimmy"	2001	Roscoe	Bones (soundtrack)	
"Fuck With Us"	2001	Tray-Dee, Xzibit	Bones (soundtrack)	
"Kronologik"	2001	Cypress Hill	Stoned Raiders	
"Here Is Something You Can't Understand"	2001	Cypress Hill	Stoned Raiders	
"So Ignorant"	2001	Yukmouth, Kokane, Nate Dogg	Thug Lord: The New Testament	
"Way 2 Often"	2001	Soopafly	Dat Whoopty Woop	
"Fuck a Bitch"	2001	DJ Clue?, Snoop Dogg	The Professional 2	
"Grind Season"	2001	JoJo Pellegrino	Violator: The Album, V2.0	
"Just a Dance"	2002	Deborah Cox	The Morning After	
"What You Know"	2002	Pacewon	Won	
"Wuz Crackulatin' 2000"	2002	2wice	Whut Dew U Mean!	
"Run and Duck"	2002	—N/a	The Playa Rich Project 2	
"Me & My Homies"	2002	DJ Desue	Art of War	
"Keep It Gangsta"	2002	Kool Savas	Der Beste Tag Meines Labens	
"Something Is Going to Make Me Smack This Bitch"	2002	Warcloud, Black Knights, Sandman	Nightmares That Surface from Shallow Sleep	
"Giving Up Nuthin'"	2002	Dru Down	Gangsta Pimpin'	
"On Me"	2003	Boo-Yaa T.R.I.B.E.	West Koasta Nostra	
"I'm Back"	2003	—N/a	Dysfunktional Family (soundtrack)	
"1 Call (Real Talk)"	2003	Devoux, Ganxta Ridd	Dysfunktional Family (soundtrack)	
"Gangsta Pimpin'"	2003	Baby Bash	The Ultimate Cartel	
"The Dungeon"	2003	Canibus	My Name Is Nobody	
"Smashing"	2003	Da 5 Footaz	Lifetime	
"Gangxtaville Pt. 2"	2003	DJ Tomekk	Beat of Life, Vol. 1	
"Gangxtaville Pt. 3"	2003	DJ Tomekk, Tatwaffe, Big C-Style	—N/a	
"Ohh!"	2003	40 Glocc	The Jakal	
"Behind the Walls" (East Coast Gangsta Mix)	2004	Shyne, Nate Dogg	Godfather Buried Alive	
"Deep Blue Sea"	2004	Cormega, Jayo Felony	Legal Hustle	
"Get It On"	2004	Dirty Rat	Rookie of the Year	
"Play Your Flutes"	2004	Goodie Mob, Sleepy Brown	One Monkey Don't Stop No Show	
"Thug World"	2004	Spice 1	The Ridah	
"Lock and Load"	2005	Lil Wayne	Tha Carter II	
"Full Circle"	2005	Keak da Sneak	On One	
"G's & Soldiers"	2005	Planet Asia	Be Cool (soundtrack)	
"Stay Down (Fuckin' Wit the Best)"	2005	Bang 'Em Smurf, Domination	God Giveth, God Taketh Away	
"Get It On"	2005	J. Wells	The Digital Master	
"Real Soon"	2005	Snoop Dogg, Daz Dillinger, Nate Dogg	Bigg Snoop Dogg Presents...Welcome to tha Chuuch: Da Album	
"We West Coast"	2005	Snoop Dogg, Daz Dillinger	Bigg Snoop Dogg Presents...Welcome to tha Chuuch: Da Album	
"Notorious DPG"	2005	Lady of Rage, RBX	Bigg Snoop Dogg Presents...Welcome to tha Chuuch: Da Album	
"Major Skrilla"	2005	Kokane, Roscoe	Mr. Kane, Pt. 2	
"Horsemen"	2005	Pak Man, The Hrsmn	Chow Time	
"Not 4 Play"	2005	Canibus	Mind Control	
"Calico"	2005	The Dayton Family	Family Feud	
"Money Thang"	2005	Spice 1, Jayo Felony	The Truth	
"It's Okay (One Blood)" (Remix)	2006	Jim Jones, Snoop Dogg, Nas, T.I., The Game, Fat Joe, Lil Wayne, N.O.R.E., Jadakiss, Styles P, Fabolous, Juelz Santana, Rick Ross, Twista, Daz Dillinger, WC, E-40, Bun B, Chamillionaire, Slim Thug, Young Dro, Clipse, Ja Rule	Doctor's Advocate	
"Baby Whose Is It"	2006	Teena Marie	Sapphire	
"Ooh Wee"	2006	Teena Marie	Sapphire	
"Candy (Drippin' Like Water)"	2006	E-40, Snoop Dogg, MC Eiht, Goldie Loc,	Tha Blue Carpet Treatment	
"Don't Stop"	2006	Snoop Dogg, WarZone	Tha Blue Carpet Treatment	
"My Introduction"	2006	Realm Reality	Character Assassination	
"Get Low"	2006	Tyrese, Too Short, Snoop Dogg	Alter Ego	
"Roll the Dice"	2006	Tyrese, Snoop Dogg	Alter Ego	
"Ghetto Dayz"	2006	Tyrese, The Game	Alter Ego	
"Fly Away"	2006	Tyrese	Alter Ego	
"The Streets Are Callin'"	2006	Kokane	Back 2 tha Clap	
"Gun Clappin'"	2006	Cashis, Roscoe, Jayo Felony, Rikanatti	Bogish Boy, Vol. 1	
"Say It to My Face"	2006	Xzibit, Don Blaze	Full Circle	
"Movin' in Your Chucks"	2006	Xzibit, Too Short	Full Circle	
"Back on the Grind"	2007	Hi-Tek, Riz, Dion	Hi-Teknology 3	
"Gangbang Music"	2007	DJ Crazy Toones, Soopafly	CT Experience	
"Lean on Me"	2007	Sa-Ra Creative Partners, Lord Nez, Erika Rose	The Hollywood Recordings	
"Throw 'Em Under the Bus"	2007	N.O.R.E., Jadakiss	Noreality	
"Hood or Nothing"	2007	Westside Bugg	The Roach Motel	
"Inner G"	2007	The Hrsmn	The Offering	
"I'm the Man"	2007	Belly	The Revolution	
"Good Evening"	2007	Belly	The Revolution	
"Montana (Back in the Days)"	2008	Ralph Myerz and the Jack Herren Band	Ralphorama!: Appetite 4 Self-Destruction	
"Money"	2008	7th Veil	Stoned	
"About"	2008	7th Veil	Stoned	
"Dubb You"	2008	Dubb Union, Traci Nelson	Snoop Dogg Presents: Dubb Union	
"Coasting"	2008	DJ Wich	The Golden Touch	
"Press Play"	2008	Snoop Dogg	Ego Trippin'	
"Smokin' Xmas Trees"	2008	—N/a	Landy & Egg Nogg: A DPG Christmas	
"When We're Fucking"	2009	B-Real, Too Short, Young De	Smoke N Mirrors	
"Cancun"	2009	Snoop Dogg	—N/a	
"Blued Up"	2009	Snoop Dogg	Bacc to tha Chuuch, Vol. 1	
"Comfortable (Remix)"	2009	Chris Starr	Bacc to tha Chuuch, Vol. 1	
"The Demo"	2010	Terrace Martin	The EP: Volume 1	
"Why Dance With the Devil, When You Have Me?"	2010	William Control, Liza Graves	Noir	
"Shake Them"	2010	D-Loc	MFK (Mad For Kings)	
"Fornever"	2010	Murs, 9th Wonder	Fornever	
"Live From Roscoe's"	2010	Murs, 9th Wonder	Fornever	
"Gotta Bang"	2010	Inspectah Deck, Billy Danze	Manifesto	
"Westside Rollin'"	2010	Snoop Dogg	We Da West	
"Let's Ride"	2010	2Pac, Rappin' 4-Tay	The Way He Wanted It, Vol. 5	
"Blow My Horn"	2011	Strong Arm Steady	Arms & Hammers	
"Don't Fuck With Me"	2011	Travis Barker, Paul Wall, Jay Rock	Give the Drummer Some	
"Smoke 1 Wit Me"	2011	OG Daddy V	The Original Hustla	
"Flow for Sale"	2011	DJ Quik	The Book of David	
"Bitch Betta Have My Money"	2011	Tyga, YG	#BitchImTheShit	
"I Just Wanna Fuck"	2011	The Game	Purp & Patron	
"I'm Home"	2011	The Game	Purp & Patron: the Hangover	
"6 In da Morning"	2012	Tydolla$ign, Joe Moses, Glasses Malone	Whoop	
"Tricks"	2012	Tydolla$ign, Joe Moses	Whoop	
"3 the Hard Way"	2012	Crooked I, Ras Kass	Psalm 82:v6 and The Barmageddon Mixtape	
"My Whole Life"	2013	Kid Red	REDemption	
"Ride"	2013	Snoop Dogg, Dam-Funk	7 Days of Funk	
"Shit Shit"	2014	HS87, N.No, B. Carr, PeeJ	We the Plug	
"The Purge"	2014	Schoolboy Q, Tyler, The Creator	Oxymoron	
"We Are the People of the World"	2014	Diamond D, Tha Alkaholiks	The Diam Piece	
"NWA"	2015	Miguel	Wildheart	
"MoonRockin"	2015	Reverie, Killah Priest	—N/a	
"E.D.I."	2015	EDIDON, Devapink, James Wade, Kokane	The Hope Dealer, Pt. 1	
"Paid Dues"	2015	2016	Niko G4	Worth the Risk
"Lickity Splickity"	Corey Feldman	2016	Angelic 2 the Core	
"Made Man"	2017	Big Boi, Killer Mike	Boomiverse	
"Inferno"	2017	Fredwreck	Grow House (OST)	
"Gangsta Gangsta"	2017	MC Eiht	Which Way Iz West	
"Futuristic Hustle"	2017	Proto Sun	Straight Outta Mars	
"Sick"	2021	Frayser Boy	Bay Day	
"Rest"		Bronze Nazareth, Kurt Solid, Dots	If You're Worried, You Should Be	
"Curse of Canaan"	2022	Vinnie Paz	Tortured in the Name of God’s Unconditional Love	
"Simple Man"	2023	Roc Marciano & Jay Worthy	Nothing Bigger Than the Program	
"Fighting for My Life in Paradise"	2024	Ice Cube	Man Down	
