= Young Roscoe Philaphornia =

Studio album by Roscoe
- Released: June 10, 2003
- Recorded: 2002–2003
- Genre: Hip hop
- Length: 51:40
- Label: Priority
- Producer: Andrew Shack (exec.); Kurupt (exec.); Caspa; Def Jef; DJ Quik; Fingazz; Gerald "Soul G" Stevens; J. Wells; L.T. Hutton; Organized Noize; Soopafly; The Co-Stars

Roscoe chronology
Young Roscoe Philaphornia (2003)	I Luv Cali (2006)

Singles from Roscoe
- 1. "Head To Toe" Released: 2002; 2. "Smooth Sailin'" Released: August 5, 2003

Professional ratings
Review scores
Source	Rating
AllMusic	4/5 stars
RapReviews	7.5/10

Young Roscoe Philaphornia is the debut studio album by American rapper Roscoe. It was released on June 10, 2003, via Priority Records. Production was handled by Organized Noize, J. Wells, the Co-Stars, Caspa, Def Jef, DJ Quik, Fingazz, L.T. Hutton, Soopafly and Soul G, with Andrew Shack and Kurupt serving as executive producers. It features guest appearances from Kokane, LaToiya Williams, Sleepy Brown and Youth Authority. The album peaked at number 148 on the Billboard 200 and number 22 on the Top R&B/Hip-Hop Albums. Its singles, "Head to Toe" and "Smooth Sailin'", made it to Hot R&B/Hip-Hop Songs at #95 and #73, respectively.

== Track listing ==
No.	Title	Writer(s)	Producer(s)	Length
1.	"5 Seconds"	David K. Williams; John Stary	Fingazz	3:25
2.	"Head to Toe" (featuring Sleepy Brown)	Williams; Patrick Brown; Ray Murray; Rico Wade; Thomas Calloway	Ray Murray; Rico Wade	4:14
3.	"It's That Time Again" (featuring LaToiya Williams)	Williams; Priest Joseph Brooks	Soopafly	4:33
4.	"Get Ready" (featuring Kokane)	Williams; Jerry Long; Ted Hogan	Caspa	4:26
5.	"Smooth Sailin'"	Williams; Jeffrey Fortson; Gerald Stevens; Maurice White	Def Jef; Soul G	3:57
6.	"Trouble"	Williams; Jon Henderson	J. Wells	3:44
7.	"Shakedown"	Williams; Lenton Terrell Hutton	L.T. Hutton	4:06
8.	"Get Flipped"	Williams; David Marvin Blake	DJ Quik	3:13
9.	"Last Night"	Williams; Neely Dinkins Jr.; Vito Colapietro	The Co-Stars	3:46
10.	"Young Roscoe"	Williams; Dinkins Jr.; Colapietro	The Co-Stars	3:41
11.	"What I Look Like"	Williams; Brown; Murray; Wade	Organized Noize	3:24
12.	"Get Low" (featuring Y.A.)	Williams; B. Pettaway; E. McKinney; S. Huggins; Henderson	J. Wells	5:21
13.	"I Call Shots, Part II"	Williams; Brown; Murray; Wade; Calloway	Organized Noize	3:43
Total length:				51:40

Sample credits

- Track 5 contains samples of "Brazilian Rhyme", written by Maurice White and performed by Earth, Wind & Fire

== Personnel ==
- David "Roscoe" Williams – main artist
- Patrick "Sleepy" Brown – featured artist (track 2), producer (tracks: 11, 13)
- LaToiya Williams – featured artist (track 3)
- Jerry "Kokane" Long Jr. – featured artist (track 4)
- B. "Young Bizzle" Pettaway – featured artist (track 12)
- E. "Tri Star" McKinney – featured artist (track 12)
- S. "YG" Huggins – featured artist (track 12)
- Jasmine McGruder – additional vocals (track 6)
- LaChrisha McClendon-McLemore – additional vocals (track 9)
- Richard Stites – drums & keyboards (track 11)
- John "Fingazz" Stary – producer (track 1)
- Ray Murray – producer (tracks: 2, 11, 13)
- Rico Wade – producer (tracks: 2, 11, 13)
- Priest "Soopafly" Brooks – producer (track 3)
- Ted "Caspa" Hogan – producer (track 4)
- Jeffrey "Def Jef" Forston – producer (track 5)
- Gerald "Soul G." Stevens – producer (track 5)
- Jon "J. Wells" Henderson – producer (tracks: 6, 12)
- Lenton Terrell Hutton – producer (track 7)
- David "DJ Quik" Blake – engineering & producer (track 8)
- Neely Dinkins Jr. – producer (tracks: 9, 10)
- Vito Colapietro – producer (tracks: 9, 10)
- Andrew M. Shack – executive producer
- Ricardo "Kurupt" Brown – executive producer
- Carlos Warlick – mixing (tracks: 1, 2, 4, 9, 10, 13)
- Dave Aaron – mixing (track 3)
- Nick Ferrero – mixing (track 5)
- Jeremy McKenzie – mixing (track 6)
- Brian Springer – mixing (track 7)
- Brian Sumner – assistant mixing (tracks: 1, 4, 7, 9, 10, 11)
- Juan Ramirez – assistant mixing (tracks: 2, 13)
- Andrew Chavel – assistant mixing (track 3)
- Chris Frame – assistant mixing (track 6)
- Peter DiRado – assistant mixing (track 8)
- Brian "Big Bass" Gardner – mastering
- Mike Baiardi – digital editing, Pro Tools
- Will Ragland – digital illustration, design
- Craig Marshall – A&R

== Charts ==
Chart (2003)	Peak position
US Billboard 200	148
US Top R&B/Hip-Hop Albums (Billboard)	22
US Heatseekers Albums (Billboard)	3
