= Kill at Will =

EP by Ice Cube
- Released: December 19, 1990
- Recorded: 1990
- Genres: Hip hop; political hip hop; gangsta rap
- Length: 21:53
- Label: Priority
- Producers: Ice Cube; Sir Jinx; Chilly Chill

Ice Cube chronology
AmeriKKKa's Most Wanted (1990)	Kill at Will (1990)	Death Certificate (1991)

Kill at Will (titled At Will in its censored version) is an extended play by American rapper Ice Cube, released on December 19, 1990, via Priority Records. Kill at Will was a commercial success, as it received a platinum certification from the RIAA.

== Background ==
Kill at Will was released soon after AmeriKKKa's Most Wanted (Ice Cube's full-length debut album), which capitalized on his newfound solo success. "Endangered Species (Tales from the Darkside)" and "Get Off My Dick and Tell Yo Bitch to Come Here" initially appeared on AmeriKKKa's Most Wanted in their original forms; on Kill at Will, the former was a remix, but the latter was nearly a new song (the version on AmeriKKKa's Most Wanted is less than a minute in length while the version on Kill at Will is over three minutes in length). The remaining five songs remained exclusive to Kill at Will.

== Critical reception ==
Professional ratings
Review scores
Source	Rating
AllMusic	4/5 stars
Robert Christgau	A−
The Encyclopedia of Popular Music	3/5 stars
Entertainment Weekly	C+
NME	7/10
The Rolling Stone Album Guide	4/5 stars
The Source	3.5/5 stars
The Washington Post	(favorable)

Trouser Press praised "the lighthearted 'Jackin’ for Beats' (which bites EPMD, PE, Digital Underground, LL Cool J and others) and the devastating 'Dead Homiez', in which [Cube] solemnly contemplates the murder of a friend over an evocative mix of horn, guitar and piano."

Robert Christgau stated: "I don't want to claim the criticism is getting to him--still talking tough on this interim EP, he remixes 'Get Off My Dick and Tell Your Bitch To Come Here.' But he's keeping his woman problem to himself and putting the gangsta shit in perspective: 'The Product' tells a young black con's story from his pops's nut, 'Dead Homiez' cops to a sadness a lesser outlaw might consider unmanly. With Sir Jinx running the board, the beats never work up to carpet-bomb density. And if Ice Cube keeps rhyming like this, you won't care."

== Track listing ==
No.	Title	Writer(s)	Producer(s)	Length
1.	"Endangered Species (Tales from the Darkside) (Remix)" (featuring Chuck D)	O'Shea Jackson; Carlton Ridenhour; Eric Sadler	Sir Jinx	4:11
2.	"Jackin' for Beats"	Jackson; Al Nichol; Allen Williams; Anthony Wheaton; Derrick Baker; Erick Sermon; Gregory Jacobs; Garry Shider; George Clinton; Howard Kaylan; Jim Pons; John Barbata; Mark Volman; Parrish Smith; Roger Troutman; Teren Jones; Walter Morrison; William Nichols; William Collins	Chilly Chill	2:57
3.	"Get Off My Dick and Tell Yo Bitch to Come Here (Remix)"	Jackson; Sadler	Sir Jinx	3:38
4.	"The Product"	Jackson; Arlester Christian	Sir Jinx	3:35
5.	"Dead Homiez"	Jackson	Ice Cube	3:55
6.	"JD’s Gaffilin’ (Part 2)"	Jackson; Sadler; Clinton; Collins		0:36
7.	"I Gotta Say What Up!!!"	Jackson; Isaac Hayes; Alvertis Isbell	Sir Jinx	3:06

== Partial list of samples ==
"Endangered Species (Tales from the Darkside) (Remix)"

- "The Payback" by James Brown
- "Funky Drummer" by James Brown
- "Standin' on the Verge of Gettin' It On" by Funkadelic
- "Bop Gun (Endangered Species)" by Parliament
- "Straight Outta Compton (Extended Mix)" by N.W.A
- "Bring the Noise" by Public Enemy

"The Product"

- "Good Times" by Kool and the Gang
- "Rated X" by Kool and the Gang
- "Jungle Boogie" by Kool and the Gang
- "You Can Make It If You Try" by Sly & the Family Stone
- "Train Sequence", narrated by Geoffrey Sumner
- "Funky Drummer" by James Brown
- "The Nigga Ya Love to Hate" by Ice Cube
- "Illegal Search" by LL Cool J

"I Gotta Say What Up!!!"

- "Hyperbolicsyllabicsesquedalymistic" by Isaac Hayes
- "Synthetic Substitution" by Melvin Bliss
- "Who Stole the Soul?" by Public Enemy

"Dead Homiez"

- "Rollin' wit the Lench Mob" by Ice Cube
- "Do Like I Do" by Smokey Robinson

"Jackin' for Beats"

- "It's a Man's Man's Man's World" by James Brown
- "The Payback" by James Brown
- "Funky President" by James Brown
- "Funky Drummer" by James Brown
- "I Know You Got Soul" by Bobby Byrd
- "Hot Pants - I'm Coming, I'm Coming, I'm Coming" by Bobby Byrd
- "Bop Gun (Endangered Species)" by Parliament
- "Sing a Simple Song" by Sly & the Family Stone
- "Big Ole Butt" by LL Cool J
- "So Wat Cha Sayin'" by EPMD
- "Heed the Word of the Brother" by X-Clan
- "They Call Me D-Nice" by D-Nice
- "Ashley's Roachclip" by the Soul Searchers
- "Bon Bon Vie" by T.S. Monk
- "Tramp" by Lowell Fulson
- "Psychedelic Shack" by the Temptations
- "Hector" by Village Callers
- "The Big Beat" by Billy Squier
- "The Haunted House", narrated by Laura Olsher
- "Welcome to the Terrordome" by Public Enemy
- "The Humpty Dance" by Digital Underground
- "Rebel Without a Pause" by Public Enemy
- "100 Miles and Runnin'" by N.W.A
- "Buzzsaw" by The Turtles

== Later samples ==
- "Dead Homiez"
  - "Young Black Male" by 2Pac from the album 2Pacalypse Now
- "The Product"
  - "Young Black Male" by 2Pac from the album 2Pacalypse Now

== Album singles ==
"Endangered Species (Tales from the Darkside)"

- Released: 1990
- B-side: "Dead Homiez"

== Charts ==
=== Weekly charts ===
Chart (1990/1991)	Peak position
Australian Albums (ARIA)	133
US Billboard 200	34
US Top R&B/Hip-Hop Albums (Billboard)	5

=== Year-end charts ===
Chart (1991)	Position
US Top R&B/Hip-Hop Albums (Billboard)	38

== Certifications ==
Region	Certification	Certified units/sales
United States (RIAA)	Platinum	1,000,000^{^}
^{^} Shipments figures based on certification alone.
