= Sir Jinx =

American hip hop producer (born 1970)

- Also known as: Jinx
- Born: Anthony D. Wheaton; June 3, 1970 (age 56); Los Angeles, California, U.S.
- Genres: West Coast hip-hop; gangsta rap
- Occupations: Record producer; disc jockey; rapper
- Years active: 1986–present
- Labels: Priority; EMI
- Formerly of: C.I.A.

Anthony D. Wheaton (born June 3, 1970), professionally known by his stage name Sir Jinx, is an American hip-hop record producer and rapper from Los Angeles. He is a cousin of multi-platinum producer Dr. Dre. He began his career as a member of the group C.I.A. in the mid-80s with Ice Cube and Kid Disaster. He has produced tracks for the likes of Westside Connection, Too Short, Yo-Yo, Tone Loc, Kool G Rap, CeCe Peniston, Xzibit and Kurupt among others, and also remixed songs for Rage Against the Machine, Public Enemy and Toni Braxton.

== Career ==
=== 1980s ===
Anthony "Sir Jinx" Wheaton began his career in the early-80s when Wheaton moved to South Central, not too far away from soon-to-be rapper Ice Cube. Wheaton already had inherited knowledge of the culture around hip-hop by then. Through Cube, Wheaton later met with Cube’s other cousin, Del the Funky Homosapien, and became close friends based on similar interests. Cube had been developing a career as a rapper. Along with Kid Disaster, they started a group which would later become known as C.I.A.

As part of the then-named Stereo Crew duo with Ice Cube, they signed with Epic Records and released their debut single "She's a Skag" in 1986, which was produced by Wheaton's cousin Dr. Dre and Dre's World Class Wreckin' Cru bandmate Alonzo Williams. Poor single sales caused them to be soon dropped off of the label. Joined by fellow rapper Kid Disaster, they were picked by Kru-Cut Records and changed the group's name to C.I.A. In 1987 the trio released their single "My Posse" and appeared on the cover of N.W.A. and the Posse. Cube and Dre later focused on the group N.W.A, which led to the disbanding of C.I.A. Wheaton produced fellow rapper Dazzie Dee's first extended play Turn It Loose, released in 1989.

=== 1990s ===
When Cube left N.W.A and Ruthless Records over a financial dispute, all the former C.I.A. members along with several other artists formed the Lench Mob posse on Cube's founded Lench Mob Records label. Wheaton and Cube in collaboration with Chilly Chill and New York-based hip hop production team The Bomb Squad produced Ice Cube's debut solo studio album AmeriKKKa's Most Wanted and the follow-up Kill at Will EP, both released in 1990. Both these projects were certified Platinum by the Recording Industry Association of America. In the same year, Wheaton produced "Ain't Nothin' but a Word to Me", the only song from Too $hort's Short Dog's in the House album, which also featured a guest appearance from Ice Cube

In 1991, Wheaton produced a significant number of songs on Yo-Yo's Make Way for the Motherlode, WC and the Maad Circle's Ain't a Damn Thang Changed, and Ice Cube's Death Certificate, including the N.W.A diss track "No Vaseline". He also produced Ice Cube's "How to Survive in South Central", from the Boyz n the Hood soundtrack, and Tone Lōc "I Adore You". Continuing into 1992 with Cube's The Predator and Yo-Yo's 1992 Black Pearl, Wheaton also ventured into the East Coast hip hop scene, producing the majority of Kool G Rap's final studio album with DJ Polo, Live and Let Die, and also provided additional production on two tracks for George Clinton's son Trey Lewd's Drop the Line, and the title track for Music from the Motion Picture Trespass. Wheaton created remixes for rap-rock outfits such as Rage Against the Machine's "Guerrilla Radio", "Bullet in the Head", and an unreleased remix of "Bombtrack", all of which were recorded in 1992.

After producing a couple of tracks on Ice Cube's 1993 album Lethal Injection, Wheaton stopped working with Cube and his group Da Lench Mob due to their controversial directions. He moved on to producing for R&B-oriented solo acts such as CeCe Peniston, Gerald Levert, Isaac Hayes, Teena Marie, and former Bell Biv DeVoe member Ricky Bell.

Following a low-profile independent solo album in 1995, Wheaton returned to production, producing on Gooch's 1997 album A Lot on It and Xzibit's 1998 album 40 Dayz & 40 Nightz. He also helped to produce skits on Tash's 1999 Rap Life and helped on Xzibit's 2000 Restless.

=== 2000s ===
Wheaton provided production work on a song from comedian Eddie Griffin's 2003 film Dysfunktional Family soundtrack. Same year he produced a couple of tracks on The Comrads member Gangsta album Penitentiary Chances, as well as a posse cut on Westside Connection's album Terrorist Threats.

Outside of some minor production on Kurupt's 2004 album Originals and 2005 album Against the Grain, Xzibit's 2004 album Weapons of Mass Destruction, and Ras Kass's 2009 project Quarterly, Sir Jinx was relatively low-key during this period.

=== 2010s ===
In 2010, Wheaton produced a song for Sadat X's Wild Cowboys II album, as well as the track "Life in California" from Ice Cube's I Am the West album, which marked the first time Wheaton and Cube had worked together on any new material together in several years. In an October 2010 interview for HipHopDX, Wheaton stated that he was going to help produce cousin Dr. Dre's long-awaited release Detox. In spite of his relation to Dr. Dre, it would have been the first album to feature both Wheaton and Dre producing; the album remains stuck in limbo.

Wheaton collaborated with Tri Star and Dat Boi Hop to form the group General Population; they released their album Sir Jinx Presents General Population: Rime Scene in 2011, featuring guest appearances from Butch Cassidy, Roscoe, Devin the Dude, Jayo Felony, Kurupt, and Ras Kass. The following year, Wheaton produced for Tri Star's project Trilogy. Together with Mike & Keys, Jinx produced debut Serial Killers single "First 48". In 2016, he and Dre produced T.I.'s non-album single "Dope", which featured vocals by Marsha Ambrosius.

=== Film and television ===
Wheaton has made appearances co-hosting BET's Rap City: Tha Basement.

He has also DJ'ed for various TV shows including Jimmy Kimmel Live! and "The Orlando Jones Show".

In 1993, Wheaton appeared in a cameo in John Singleton's romantic drama film Poetic Justice.

== Production discography ==
Year	Song	Artist	Album	Notes
1988	"Turn It Loose"	Dazzie Dee	Turn It Loose	N/A
1989	"You Better Think"	Dazzie Dee	Turn It Loose	N/A
1989	"Slipping into Darkness"	Dazzie Dee	Turn It Loose	N/A
1990	"Better Off Dead"	Ice Cube	AmeriKKKa's Most Wanted	prod. w/ Ice Cube
1990	"The Nigga Ya Love to Hate"	Ice Cube	AmeriKKKa's Most Wanted	prod. by The Bomb Squad; co-prod. w/ Ice Cube
1990	"AmeriKKKa's Most Wanted"	Ice Cube	AmeriKKKa's Most Wanted	prod. by The Bomb Squad; co-prod. w/ Ice Cube
1990	"What They Hittin' Foe?"	Ice Cube	AmeriKKKa's Most Wanted	prod. by The Bomb Squad; co-prod. w/ Ice Cube
1990	"You Can't Fade Me"	Ice Cube	AmeriKKKa's Most Wanted	prod. by The Bomb Squad; co-prod. w/ Ice Cube
1990	"Once Upon a Time in the Projects"	Ice Cube	AmeriKKKa's Most Wanted	co-prod. by The Bomb Squad
1990	"Turn Off the Radio"	Ice Cube	AmeriKKKa's Most Wanted	prod. by The Bomb Squad; co-prod. w/ Ice Cube
1990	"Endangered Species (Tales from the Darkside)"	Ice Cube, Chuck D	AmeriKKKa's Most Wanted	prod. by The Bomb Squad; co-prod. w/ Ice Cube
1990	"A Gangsta's Fairytale"	Ice Cube, Lil Russ	AmeriKKKa's Most Wanted	prod. w/ Ice Cube; co-prod. by The Bomb Squad
1990	"I'm Only Out for One Thang"	Ice Cube, Flavor Flav	AmeriKKKa's Most Wanted	prod. w/ Ice Cube; co-prod. by The Bomb Squad
1990	"Get Off My Dick and Tell Yo Bitch to Come Here"	Ice Cube	AmeriKKKa's Most Wanted	prod. by The Bomb Squad; co-prod. w/ Ice Cube
1990	"The Drive-By"	Ice Cube	AmeriKKKa's Most Wanted	N/A
1990	"Rollin' Wit the Lench Mob"	Ice Cube	AmeriKKKa's Most Wanted	prod. by The Bomb Squad; co-prod. w/ Ice Cube
1990	"Who's the Mack?"	Ice Cube	AmeriKKKa's Most Wanted	prod. w/ The Bomb Squad
1990	"It's a Man's World"	Ice Cube, Yo-Yo	AmeriKKKa's Most Wanted	prod. w/ Ice Cube
1990	"The Bomb"	Ice Cube	AmeriKKKa's Most Wanted	co-prod. by The Bomb Squad
1990	"Ain't Nothin' but a Word to Me"	Too $hort, Ice Cube	Short Dog's in the House	N/A
1990	"Jackin' for Beats"	Ice Cube, Del the Funky Homosapien	Kill at Will	prod. w/ Chilly Chill
1990	"The Product"	Ice Cube	Kill at Will	N/A
1990	"I Gotta Say What Up!!!"	Ice Cube	Kill at Will	N/A
1991	"Stand up for Your Rights"	Yo-Yo, Ricky Harris, Tamika Ingram, Threat	Make Way for the Motherlode	prod. w/ Ice Cube
1991	"Stompin' to the '90s"	Yo-Yo	Make Way for the Motherlode	prod. w/ Ice Cube
1991	"You Can't Play with My Yo Yo"	Yo-Yo, Ice Cube	Make Way for the Motherlode	prod. w/ Ice Cube
1991	"Cube Gets Played"	Ricky Harris	Make Way for the Motherlode	prod. w/ Ice Cube
1991	"Put a Lid on It"	Yo-Yo	Make Way for the Motherlode	prod. w/ Ice Cube
1991	"What Can I Do?"	Yo-Yo, Ice Cube	Make Way for the Motherlode	prod. w/ Ice Cube
1991	"Dedication"	LA Jay, Ricky Harris	Make Way for the Motherlode	prod. w/ Ice Cube
1991	"Sisterland"	Yo-Yo	Make Way for the Motherlode	prod. w/ Ice Cube
1991	"The I.B.W.C. National Anthem"	Yo-Yo, Sparkles, Dawn, Diamond	Make Way for the Motherlode	prod. w/ Ice Cube
1991	"Make Way for the Motherlode"	Yo-Yo	Make Way for the Motherlode	prod. w/ Ice Cube
1991	"Tonight's the Night"	Yo-Yo, Dazzie Dee	Make Way for the Motherlode	prod. w/ Ice Cube
1991	"I Got Played"	Yo-Yo	Make Way for the Motherlode	prod. w/ Ice Cube
1991	"Girl, Don't Be No Fool"	Yo-Yo	Make Way for the Motherlode	prod. w/ Ice Cube
1991	"Ain't Nobody Better"	Yo-Yo	Make Way for the Motherlode	prod. w/ Ice Cube
1991	"Outro"	Ricky Harris	Make Way for the Motherlode	prod. w/ Ice Cube
1991	"More of What I Can Do"	Sir Jinx	Make Way for the Motherlode	prod. w/ Ice Cube
1991	"How to Survive in South Central"	Ice Cube	Boyz n the Hood (Music From the Motion Picture)	prod. w/ Ice Cube
1991	"(Everybody) Get Up"	Roger Troutman	Bridging the Gap	add. prod.; prod. by David Gamson & Roger Troutman
1991	"Intro"	WC and the Maad Circle	Ain't a Damn Thang Changed	prod. w/ DJ Crazy Toones
1991	"Ain't a Damn Thang Changed"	WC and the Maad Circle	Ain't a Damn Thang Changed	prod. w/ WC; co-prod. by Chilly Chill & DJ Crazy Toones
1991	"Behind Closed Doors"	WC and the Maad Circle, Dawn Silva, Jackie Simley, M.L. Davis	Ain't a Damn Thang Changed	prod. w/ WC; co-prod. by Chilly Chill & DJ Crazy Toones
1991	"Out on a Furlough"	WC and the Maad Circle, Cassanova Jeff, Chilly Chill, Jazzy D, Mike	Ain't a Damn Thang Changed	prod. w/ WC; co-prod. by DJ Crazy Toones
1991	"Caught n a Fad"	WC and the Maad Circle	Ain't a Damn Thang Changed	prod. w/ WC; co-prod. by Chilly Chill
1991	"Fuck My Daddy"	WC and the Maad Circle, Foe Doe Taylor, Lil' Dee	Ain't a Damn Thang Changed	prod. w/ WC
1991	"Get up on That Funk"	WC and the Maad Circle, Jazzy D	Ain't a Damn Thang Changed	prod. w/ WC
1991	"Gettin' Looped / Dress Code"	WC and the Maad Circle	Ain't a Damn Thang Changed	prod. w/ WC; co-prod. by Chilly Chill & DJ Crazy Toones
1991	"Smokers La La Bye"	WC and the Maad Circle, Kaeco	Ain't a Damn Thang Changed	prod. w/ DJ Crazy Toones
1991	"You Don't Work, U Don't Eat"	WC and the Maad Circle, J-Dee, MC Eiht, Ice Cube	Ain't a Damn Thang Changed	prod. w/ Chilly Chill & DJ Crazy Toones
1991	"Grandma Locked Out (Skit)"	WC and the Maad Circle	Ain't a Damn Thang Changed	N/A
1991	"Ghetto Serenade"	WC and the Maad Circle	Ain't a Damn Thang Changed	prod. w/ WC; co-prod. by DJ Crazy Toones
1991	"Back to the Underground"	WC and the Maad Circle	Ain't a Damn Thang Changed	prod. w/ WC
1991	"A Soldiers Story"	WC and the Maad Circle, Dawn Silva, Jackie Simley, M.L. Davis	Ain't a Damn Thang Changed	N/A
1991	"The Funeral (Intro)"	Ice Cube	Death Certificate	N/A
1991	"The Wrong Nigga to Fuck Wit"	Ice Cube	Death Certificate	prod. w/ Ice Cube
1991	"Robin Lench (Interlude)"	Ice Cube	Death Certificate	prod. w/ Boogiemen
1991	"Look Who's Burnin'"	Ice Cube	Death Certificate	prod. w/ Ice Cube
1991	"The Birth"	Ice Cube, Khalid Abdul Muhammad	Death Certificate	prod. w/ Ice Cube
1991	"I Wanna Kill Sam"	Ice Cube	Death Certificate	prod. w/ Ice Cube
1991	"Black Korea"	Ice Cube	Death Certificate	prod. w/ Ice Cube
1991	"True to the Game"	Ice Cube	Death Certificate	prod. w/ Ice Cube
1991	"Us"	Ice Cube	Death Certificate	prod. w/ Ice Cube
1991	"No Vaseline"	Ice Cube	Death Certificate	prod. w/ Ice Cube
1991	"I Adore You"	Tone Lōc	Cool Hand Lōc	prod. w/ Tone Lōc
1992	"You Should Have Listened"	Yo-Yo	Black Pearl	N/A
1992	"I Can't Take No More"	Yo-Yo	Black Pearl	N/A
1992	"Will You Be Mine"	Yo-Yo	Black Pearl	N/A
1992	"Fuck 'Em (Insert)"	Ice Cube	The Predator	N/A
1992	"Who Got the Camera?"	Ice Cube	The Predator	N/A
1992	"Say Hi to the Bad Guy"	Ice Cube	The Predator	N/A
1992	"Intro"	Kool G Rap, DJ Polo	Live and Let Die	prod. w/ Kool G Rap
1992	"On the Run"	Kool G Rap, DJ Polo	Live and Let Die	prod. w/ Kool G Rap
1992	"Live and Let Die"	Kool G Rap, DJ Polo	Live and Let Die	prod. w/ Kool G Rap
1992	"Crime Pays"	Kool G Rap, DJ Polo	Live and Let Die	prod. w/ Kool G Rap
1992	"Home Sweet Home"	Kool G Rap, DJ Polo	Live and Let Die	prod. w/ Kool G Rap
1992	"Train Robbery"	Kool G Rap, DJ Polo	Live and Let Die	prod. w/ Kool G Rap
1992	"#1 with a Bullet"	Kool G Rap, DJ Polo, Big Daddy Kane	Live and Let Die	prod. w/ Kool G Rap
1992	"Operation CB"	Kool G Rap, DJ Polo	Live and Let Die	prod. w/ Kool G Rap
1992	"Go for Your Guns"	Kool G Rap, DJ Polo	Live and Let Die	prod. w/ Kool G Rap
1992	"Letters"	Kool G Rap, DJ Polo	Live and Let Die	prod. w/ Kool G Rap
1992	"Nuff Said"	Kool G Rap, DJ Polo	Live and Let Die	prod. w/ Kool G Rap
1992	"Edge of Sanity"	Kool G Rap, DJ Polo	Live and Let Die	prod. w/ Kool G Rap
1992	"Still Wanted Dead or Alive"	Kool G Rap, DJ Polo	Live and Let Die	prod. w/ Kool G Rap
1992	"Two to the Head"	Kool G Rap, DJ Polo, Scarface, Bushwick Bill, Ice Cube	Live and Let Die	prod. w/ Kool G Rap
1992	"Trespass"	Ice-T, Ice Cube	Music from the Motion Picture Trespass	N/A
1992	"I'll Be Good to You"	Trey Lewd, Dazzie Dee	Drop the Line	add. prod.; prod. by Trey Lewd
1992	"Hoodlum Who Ride"	Trey Lewd	Drop the Line	add. prod.
1993	"The Shot (Intro)"	Ice Cube	Lethal Injection	N/A
1993	"Lil Ass Gee"	Ice Cube	Lethal Injection	N/A
1994	"Whatever It Is"	CeCe Peniston	Thought 'Ya Knew	N/A
1994	"Give What I'm Givin'"	CeCe Peniston	Thought 'Ya Knew	N/A
1994	"Maybe It's the Way"	CeCe Peniston	Thought 'Ya Knew	N/A
1995	"Higher"	Ice Cube	Music from the Motion Picture Higher Learning	N/A
1995	"Intro"	Sir Jinx	Chastisement (Deez Days)	N/A
1995	"All About Money"	Sir Jinx, Isaac Hayes	Chastisement (Deez Days)	N/A
1995	"I Putz It Down"	Sir Jinx	Chastisement (Deez Days)	N/A
1995	"City Never Sleepz"	Sir Jinx	Chastisement (Deez Days)	N/A
1995	"No Love"	Sir Jinx	Chastisement (Deez Days)	N/A
1995	"Ain't Givin' Up No Love"	Sir Jinx	Chastisement (Deez Days)	N/A
1995	"Right Here"	Sir Jinx, Ray Shawn	Chastisement (Deez Days)	N/A
1995	"Pic-A-Nic"	Sir Jinx, Gerald Levert	Chastisement (Deez Days)	co-prod. by Craze
1995	"Rally Park"	Sir Jinx, Aaron P., Chuck Daddy, Ray Shawn	Chastisement (Deez Days)	N/A
1995	"Insert: Old School Robin Lench Iz Back (With a Twisted)"	Sir Jinx	Chastisement (Deez Days)	N/A
1995	"Who'z da Man (Sir Jinx's Theme Song)"	Sir Jinx	Chastisement (Deez Days)	N/A
1995	"Life Stylez"	Sir Jinx	Chastisement (Deez Days)	N/A
1995	"Sho-Nuff"	Sir Jinx	Chastisement (Deez Days)	N/A
1995	"Come Blaze wit Me"	Sir Jinx	Chastisement (Deez Days)	N/A
1995	"Insert: Phone Call"	Sir Jinx	Chastisement (Deez Days)	N/A
1995	"Don't Get It Twisted"	Sir Jinx	Chastisement (Deez Days)	N/A
1995	"Insert: Beaz & Nigz"	Sir Jinx	Chastisement (Deez Days)	N/A
1995	"Beaz & Nigz"	Sir Jinx	Chastisement (Deez Days)	co-prod. by Aaron P.
1995	"Whoz Watching Who"	Sir Jinx, Madd K.D.	Chastisement (Deez Days)	N/A
1995	"Free Your Mind"	Sir Jinx	Chastisement (Deez Days)	N/A
1995	"The Mindstate"	Sir Jinx	Chastisement (Deez Days)	N/A
1995	"Insert: Power to the People"	Sir Jinx	Chastisement (Deez Days)	N/A
1995	"Power to the People"	Sir Jinx	Chastisement (Deez Days)	N/A
1997	"Intro"	Gooch, Ike Turner	A Lot on It	N/A
1997	"Keep It on the Down Low"	Gooch, Faizon Love, Torry Woods	A Lot on It	N/A
1997	"Sponsorin' Hoez (Insert)"	Gooch	A Lot on It	N/A
1997	"West Coast Playa"	Gooch, Sir Jinx	A Lot on It	N/A
1997	"Black Wednesday"	Gooch	A Lot on It	N/A
1997	"The Game Ain't the Same"	Gooch	A Lot on It	N/A
1997	"Fifty Wayz"	Gooch, Kool G Rap	A Lot on It	N/A
1997	"Night Life"	Gooch	A Lot on It	N/A
1997	"Hay"	Gooch	A Lot on It	N/A
1997	"A Lot on It"	Gooch	A Lot on It	N/A
1997	"Come Back to Me"	Gooch, Ricky Bell	A Lot on It	N/A
1997	"Where I've Been"	Gooch	A Lot on It	N/A
1997	"Wishin' for a Star"	Gooch	A Lot on It	N/A
1997	"Something's Going Down"	Gooch	A Lot on It	N/A
1997	"When It's Late"	Gooch	A Lot on It	N/A
1997	"Put My Hands on You (Insert)"	Gooch	A Lot on It	N/A
1997	"Baby Mama"	Gooch	A Lot on It	N/A
1997	"The Message from Beyond"	2Pac	A Lot on It	N/A
1997	"L.I.F.E."	Gooch	A Lot on It	N/A
1998	"The Last Night (Intro)"	Xzibit	40 Dayz & 40 Nightz	prod. w/ Xzibit
1998	"Chamber Music"	Xzibit	40 Dayz & 40 Nightz	prod. w/ Xzibit
1998	"Chronic Keeping 101 (Interlude)"	Xzibit	40 Dayz & 40 Nightz	N/A
1998	"Shroomz"	Xzibit	40 Dayz & 40 Nightz	N/A
1998	"Jason (48 Months Interlude)"	Xzibit	40 Dayz & 40 Nightz	N/A
1998	"Inside Job"	Xzibit	40 Dayz & 40 Nightz	prod. w/ Pockets
1998	"Outro"	Xzibit	40 Dayz & 40 Nightz	prod. w/ Xzibit
1998	"Don't Let the Money Make You"	Xzibit, King Tee, Soopafly	40 Dayz & 40 Nightz	N/A
1999	"Cops" (Skit)	Tash	Rap Life	N/A
1999	"Game Show" (Skit)	Tash	Rap Life	N/A
1999	"Goggles" (Skit)	Tash, Danielle O'Donnell, E-Swift	Rap Life	N/A
2000	"Intro/Restless"	Xzibit	Restless	prod. w/ Thayod Ausar
2003	"Dys-Funk-Tional"	Eddie Griffin, Spider Loc	Dysfunktional Family	N/A
2003	"G.A.N.G.S.T.A." (Intro)	Gangsta	Penitentiary Chances	N/A
2003	"On Me"	Gangsta, WC, Kokane	Penitentiary Chances	prod. w/ Dae One
2003	"Bangin' at the Party"	Westside Connection, K-Mac, Skoop Delania, Deviossi	Terrorist Threats	prod. w/ DJ Jamal
2004	"Final Testament"	Kurupt, CJ Ginavece, Keitarock	Originals	N/A
2004	"Bang'n My Amps"	Kurupt	Originals	N/A
2004	"L.A.X."	Xzibit	Weapons of Mass Destruction	prod. w/ Tha Real Mystro
2005	"Stalkin'"	Kurupt	Against the Grain	N/A
2005	"Hustlin'"	Kurupt, Big Tri, Young Tone	Against the Grain	N/A
2009	"Started Sumthin"	Ras Kass, Krondon, Maria	Quarterly	N/A
2010	"Pray"	Sadat X, Umi, M-1, Kurupt, Sir Jinx	Wild Cowboys II	N/A
2010	"Life In California"	Ice Cube, Jayo Felony, WC	I Am the West	prod. w/ Dae One
2011	"(Intro) 3:00 P.M."	Sir Jinx, Tri Star, Dat Boi Hop	Sir Jinx Presents General Population: Rime Scene	N/A
2011	"Rime Scene"	Sir Jinx, Tri Star, Dat Boi Hop, Jayo Felony	Sir Jinx Presents General Population: Rime Scene	prod. w/ Trevor Lawrence Jr.
2011	"Die Making Money"	Sir Jinx, Tri Star, Dat Boi Hop, Brandi Kane	Sir Jinx Presents General Population: Rime Scene	prod. w/ Tha Futuristik
2011	"Fate"	Sir Jinx, Tri Star, Dat Boi Hop	Sir Jinx Presents General Population: Rime Scene	prod. w/ Thayod
2011	"Oh My God"	Sir Jinx, Tri Star, Dat Boi Hop	Sir Jinx Presents General Population: Rime Scene	prod. w/ Jesse West
2011	"In My Footsteps"	Sir Jinx, Tri Star, Dat Boi Hop, Roscoe	Sir Jinx Presents General Population: Rime Scene	prod. w/ DJ Silk
2011	"Gather My Thoughts (Remix)"	Sir Jinx, Tri Star, Dat Boi Hop, Devin the Dude	Sir Jinx Presents General Population: Rime Scene	N/A
2011	"Bump Bump"	Sir Jinx, Tri Star, Dat Boi Hop, Roscoe	Sir Jinx Presents General Population: Rime Scene	prod. w/ Choir Boi
2011	"I Don't Take You Serious"	Sir Jinx, Tri Star, Dat Boi Hop, Butch Cassidy	Sir Jinx Presents General Population: Rime Scene	prod. w/ Tha Futuristik
2011	"Fuq Um All Nite"	Sir Jinx, Tri Star, Dat Boi Hop	Sir Jinx Presents General Population: Rime Scene	N/A
2011	"That Type of Girl"	Sir Jinx, Tri Star, Dat Boi Hop, Butch Cassidy, Choir Boi	Sir Jinx Presents General Population: Rime Scene	prod. w/ Thayod
2011	"Show Me the Money"	Sir Jinx, Tri Star, Dat Boi Hop, Damion Cantrell	Sir Jinx Presents General Population: Rime Scene	prod. w/ Track Team
2011	"45 Insert"	Sir Jinx, Tri Star, Dat Boi Hop	Sir Jinx Presents General Population: Rime Scene	prod. w/ DJ Rek
2011	"Even the Score"	Sir Jinx, Tri Star, Dat Boi Hop, M-Hat	Sir Jinx Presents General Population: Rime Scene	prod. w/ Choir Boi
2011	"Get Somethin' Mane"	Sir Jinx, Tri Star, Dat Boi Hop	Sir Jinx Presents General Population: Rime Scene	prod. w/ Tha Futuristik
2011	"The Time Is Now!"	Sir Jinx, Tri Star, Dat Boi Hop, Bone Crusher, E Note, Ras Kass, Rodney O	Sir Jinx Presents General Population: Rime Scene	prod. w/ Choir Boi
2012	"It's Time (Intro)"	Tri Star, Brother J	Triology	N/A
2012	"Look in My Eyes"	Tri Star	Triology	N/A
2012	"Do a Lil Somthin"	Tri Star	Triology	N/A
2012	"Pulled up to the Curb"	Tri Star	Triology	N/A
2012	"G Till the Day I Die"	Tri Star	Triology	N/A
2012	"Too Many Chiefs"	Tri Star, Roscoe, Slo Stallone, Young Bizzle	Triology	N/A
2012	"I'm a Rida Man"	Tri Star	Triology	N/A
2012	"Dirty"	Tri Star	Triology	N/A
2012	"That's Work"	Tri Star, Roscoe	Triology	N/A
2012	"Flip"	Tri Star	Triology	N/A
2012	"Hennessy"	Tri Star, Kurupt, Young Tone	Triology	N/A
2012	"Stick to Myself"	Tri Star	Triology	N/A
2012	"I Will Kill You"	Tri Star, Eastwood	Triology	N/A
2012	"Loco Crazy"	Tri Star	Triology	N/A
2012	"Cutlas in My Driveway"	Tri Star	Triology	N/A
2012	"Dress Code Killa"	Tri Star	Triology	N/A
2012	"Till the End of Tri (Outro)"	Tri Star	Triology	N/A
2013	"First 48"	Serial Killers	Serial Killers Vol. 1	prod. w/ Mike & Keys
2016	"Dope"	T.I., Marsha Ambrosius	N/A	prod. w/ Dr. Dre
