= Break Your Back =

Break Your Back may refer to:

- "Break Your Back", a song by Jay Sean
- "Break Your Back", a song by Ultravox from Quartet
- "Break Your Back", a piece by Willie Henderson

== See also ==
- "Break Ya Back (In a Good Way)", a song by Avant from Avant
- "Break Yo Back", a song by Kurupt from Originals
