= Dazzie Dee =

American rapper

- Also known as: Dazzie D., Saccs, Sacc's, Bigg Saccs, Dazzy D., DJ Urkel Dee
- Born: November 30, 1970 (age 55)
- Origin: South Los Angeles, Compton, California, United States
- Genres: West Coast hip hop, G-funk
- Occupations: Rapper, producer
- Instruments: Vocals, Drums, Keyboards, Drum, Sampler
- Years active: 1988–present
- Labels: Geed Up Records (Present); Big Face Gang Entertainment

Dazzie Dee is an American West Coast hip hop rapper and record producer who has collaborated and affiliated with artists such as Suga Free, Mausberg, DJ Quik, Ice Cube, Shade Sheist, K-Dee, Kool G Rap, Coolio, Mixmaster Spade, Yo-Yo, Da Lench Mob, and many more. He released two solo albums in 1996, Where's My Receipt? and The Re-Birth, with the most known singles "Knee Deep", "Everybody Wants To Be A Gangsta", and "Where You From?".

== Early life ==
=== Career ===
Lidell Williams was born on November 30, Los Angeles, California. He attended and graduated from Washington Preparatory High School in 1989. At 14 Williams met Dr. Dre, Sir Jinx and K-Dee. He's been a gang member of 107th Street UG/BC Crips set, according to Sheppard, member of Skool Boyz. His first EP Turn It Loose was produced by Dr. Dre and Sir Jinx. He was one of the original members of the Lench Mob records, which it was formed by Ice Cube. Due to artistic differences, he left the label to record his first solo album Where's My Receipt released on Capitol Records in 1995. Then he made a re-issue for the album as The Re-Birth on Raging Bull Records in 1996. It was produced by DJ Battlecat and had guest appearances from Ice Cube, Coolio, K-Dee and Tha Chill from Compton's Most Wanted. It's considered by many as a West Coast classic.

== With the Lench Mob ==
Dazzie Dee (formerly known as Big "Saccs"), is a G-funk rapper and an original former member of the legendary West Coast record label Lench Mob along with Ice Cube, K-Dee, J-Dee, Yo-Yo, Chilly Chill, T-Bone, Shorty and more. Due to artistic differences, he left the label to record his first solo album Where's My Receipt released on Capitol Records in 1995. Then he made a re-issue for the album as The Re-Birth on Raging Bull Records in 1996.

== Dazzie Dee productions ==
Studio albums, EPs

- 1988: Turn It Loose EP
- 1989: Dazzie Dee
- 1995: Where's My Receipt
- 1996: The Re-Birth
- 2012: The 7th Letter
- 2014: Loc’stradamus
- 2022: BAKING SODA
- 2023: Rewind
- 2023: Westcoast BoomSlap
- 2023: Pacific Standard Time
- 2024: The Re-Slaps

Singles

- 1995: "Everybody Wants To Be A Gangsta"
- 1996: "Knee Deep"
- 1996: "Where You From?"
- 2014: "Who'z Down Wit Me"

Appearance(s)

- 1991: Yo-Yo – Make Way for the Motherlode
- 1992: Kool G Rap & D.J. Polo – Live And Let Die
- 1994: Str8-G – Shadow of a G
- 1996: NU City Mass Choir – God Is Able
- 2001: Sqeek Da Primadonna – PMS
- 2004: XL Middleton – Music 4 A Drunken Evening
- 2012: Big Sono – Left Overz EP
- 2012: Sisma X – Step Back
- 2013: CartelSons – Drugstore Music
- 2013: Shade Sheist – BLACKOPS EP
- 2014: CartelSons – Solo But Not Alone
- 2014: El Don – Prototype
- 2014: Westcoast Stone – My Anthology

Collaborations

- 1996 : Killafornia Organization – Killafornia Organization

Productions

- 1994: Str8-G – Shadow of a G
- 2000: Mausberg – Non-Fiction
- 2000: Mausberg & Suga Free – The Konnectid Project, Vol. 1
- 2004: Suga Free – The New Testament (The Truth)
- 2005: The Frontlinerz – Gangstream Vol. 1
- 2006: Suga Free – Just Add Water
- 2008: Various Artists – Hustle Hard – The All Star Movie Soundtrack
- 2011: Suga Free – Why U Still Bullshittin: The Best of Suga Free (as Big Saccs)
- 2013: DJ Nik Bean Presents: Bangloose – Sonically Correct
- 2014: Dazzie Dee – Who'z Down Wit Me

Technical, Mixes

- 1997: Spice 1 – The Black Bossalini (aka Dr. Bomb From Da Bay)
- 2004: Various Artists – West Coast Unified
- 2001: DJ Filthy Mela – Summer Drama

Compilation(s)

- 1997: Various Artists – Raging Bull
- 1997: Various Artists – Phat Vibes – Rap & Hip Hop Only
- 1997: Various Artists – Essentiellement Rap
- 1997: Various Artists – Into The Groove Volume 2
- 1997: Various Artists – Hip Hop Unlimited
- 1997: Various Artists – Gangsta Hip Hop, Vol. 5
- 1999: Various Artists – Slice Presents... The Takeover
- 2004: Various Artists – Mob Life Presents: On The Grind, Mixtape Vol. 1
- 2012: Various Artists – Cocktails 4
- 2013: Docc Free – Doccstalized
- 2013: Various Artists – G-Funk Rezzurrection

== Videography ==
1. Dazzie Dee (as Big Saccs) – "West Coast History 101"
2. J-Dee, Dazzie Dee & MC Eiht – "Classic Westcoast Freestyle '93"
3. Dazzie Dee (Feat. Tha Chill & Coolio) – "On My Cide"
4. Dazzie Dee – "Everybody Wants To Be A Gangsta"
5. Dazzie Dee – "About Dat Life"
6. Dazzie Dee (Feat. K-Dee) – "All Da Time"
7. Suga Free – "Thinkin"

8. Dazzie Dee – " Different "

https://m.youtube.com/watch?v=AoPPvJ6Ou2U&pp=ygUUZGF6emllIGRlZSBkaWZmZXJlbnQ%3D

From his new 2023 album: Westcoast BoomSlap

== Notes ==
The Killafornia Organization was a Hip hop supergroup that consisted of South Central Cartel, Compton's Most Wanted, Bonaphyde, Dazzie Dee, Killa, Tray Deee, Hard Times & Wize Guyz. Their debut album, Killafornia Organization, was released in 1996 by Killa Cali Records, Thug Records and produced by 3 Strikes Prod.

== See also ==
- Lench Mob Records
- K-Dee
