= Digital Smoke =

Studio album by J. Wells and Kurupt
- Released: June 5, 2007
- Recorded: 2006–07
- Studio: Bonzi Studios; Purple Reign Studios
- Genre: West Coast hip hop
- Length: 48:50
- Label: Bonzi; Fontana Distribution
- Producer: Kurupt (exec.); Paul Holyfield (exec.); J. Wells (also exec.); Blaqtoven

Kurupt chronology
Same Day, Different Shit (2006)	Digital Smoke (2007)	The Frank and Jess Story (2008)

Professional ratings
Review scores
Source	Rating
HipHopDX	3/5
RapReviews	6.5/10

Digital Smoke is a collaborative album by American rapper and record producer J. Wells and fellow rapper Kurupt. It was released on June 5, 2007, through Bonzi Records. Recording sessions took place at Bonzi Studios and Purple Reign Studios. Production was handled by J. Wells himself, except for one track produced by Blaqthoven, with Chanz Parkman, Ervin "EP" Pope and Craig King serving as co-producers. It features guest appearances from Y.A., Gail Gotti, Goodie Mob, James DeBarge, Knoc-turn'al, Kokane, Styliztik Jones, Butch Cassidy and Tha Alkaholiks. There is a music video for the song "All We Smoke" featuring cameo appearances by Bishop Lamont, 40 Glocc and Glasses Malone.

== Track listing ==
No.	Title	Writer(s)	Producer(s)	Length
1.	"Smokestra" (performed by Kurupt & Nire Alldai)	Z. Williams; David Williams; Ervin Pope	J. Wells	0:31
2.	"All We Smoke" (performed by J. Wells & Kurupt)	Z. Williams; D. Williams; Chanz Parkman	J. Wells; Chanz Parkman^{[a]}	3:42
3.	"I'm Just Sayin'" (performed by Kurupt, Tri-Star and Roscoe)	Z. Williams; D. Williams; Eric McKinney	J. Wells	I'm Just Sayin
4.	"Get It" (performed by Kurupt, Roscoe, J. Wells and Goodie Mob)	Z. Williams; D. Williams; Willie Knighton; Robert Barnett; Parkman	J. Wells; Chanz Parkman^{[a]}	3:38
5.	"I'm Too Gangsta" (performed by Kurupt, Gail Gotti and Styliztik Jones)	Z. Williams; D. Williams; Douglas Jones; JoVan Brumfield	J. Wells	3:50
6.	"Summertime" (performed by Roscoe, Bizzle, Rose, Red Rum, Tri-Star, YG and Gail Gotti)	Z. Williams; D. Williams; E. Favre; E. McKinney; Erin Reed; S. Huggins; Brumfield; J. Carter	J. Wells	5:09
7.	"Digital Experience" (performed by Big Gipp)	Z. Williams; Cameron Gipp; Pope	J. Wells	0:27
8.	"Smokin'" (performed by Roscoe, Tri-Star, James DeBarge and YG)	D. Williams; E. McKinney; S. Huggins; James DeBarge; Anthony Ransom	Blaqthoven	3:50
9.	"History" (performed by Kurupt, J. Wells and Butch Cassidy)	Z. Williams; D. Williams; Danny Means; Pope; Kimmie	J. Wells; Ervin "EP" Pope^{[a]}	3:49
10.	"Weed Types" (performed by Kurupt)	Z. Williams; D. Williams; Pope	J. Wells; Ervin "EP" Pope^{[a]}	0:34
11.	"Los Angeles" (performed by J. Wells and Shorty)	Z. Williams; Samuel Christian; Craig King	J. Wells; Craig King^{[a]}	3:31
12.	"Got Me Going" (performed by J. Wells and Knoc-turn'al)	Z. Williams; Royal Harbor	J. Wells	3:36
13.	"It'z Nothin'" (performed by Roscoe)	Z. Williams; D. Williams	J. Wells	3:05
14.	"I Came In the Door" (performed by Kurupt and Kokane)	Z. Williams; D. Williams; Jerry Long	J. Wells	3:38
15.	"Likwit Smokestra" (performed by J. Wells and Nire Alldai)	Z. Williams; Pope	J. Wells	0:29
16.	"Let 'Em Know" (performed by J. Wells, J-Ro, Tash and Butch Cassidy)	Z. Williams; James Robinson; Rico Smith; Means	J. Wells	4:15
Total length:				48:50

Notes

- ^{^[a]} signifies an additional producer.

== Personnel ==
Main artists

- Jon "J. Wells" Henderson – vocals (tracks: 2, 4, 9, 11, 12, 15, 16), keyboards (tracks: 2–6, 9, 11–14, 16), guitar (track 12), producer (tracks: 1–7, 9–16), recording (tracks: 1–15), executive producer
- Ricardo "Kurupt" Brown – vocals (tracks: 1–5, 9, 10, 14), additional vocals (tracks: 6, 8), executive producer

Guest vocalists

- Nire Alldai – vocals (tracks: 1, 15), background vocals (track 3), additional vocals (track 6)
- Chanz Parkman – additional vocals (track 2), keyboards & additional producer (tracks: 2, 4)
- David "Roscoe" Williams – vocals (tracks: 3, 4, 6, 8, 13)
- Eric "Tri-Star" McKinney – vocals (tracks: 3, 6, 8)
- Willie "Khujo Goodie" Knighton – vocals (track 4)
- Robert "T-Mo Goodie" Barnett – vocals (track 4)
- JoVan "Gail Gotti" Brumfield Brown – vocals (tracks: 5, 6)
- Douglas "Styliztik" Jones – vocals (track 5)
- B. "Young Bizzle" Pettaway – vocals (track 6)
- Rose – vocals (track 6)
- Red Rum – vocals (track 6)
- S. "Y.G." Huggins – vocals (tracks: 6, 8)
- Cameron "Big Gipp" Gipp – vocals (track 7)
- James DeBarge – vocals (track 8)
- Drew Sidora – additional vocals (track 8)
- Danny "Butch Cassidy" Means – additional vocals (tracks: 9, 16)
- Kimmie – additional vocals (track 9)
- Samuel "Shorty" Christian – additional vocals (track 11)
- Royal "Knoc-turn'al" Harbor – vocals (track 12)
- Jerry "Kokane" Long – vocals (track 14)
- James "J-Ro" Robinson – vocals (track 16)
- Rico "Tash" Smith – vocals (track 16)

Guest musicians

- Ervin "EP" Pope – keyboards (tracks: 1, 7, 9, 10, 15), additional producer (tracks: 9, 10)
- Keenan "Kee Note" Holloway – bass (tracks: 1, 7, 15)
- Anthony "Blaqthoven" Ransom – keyboards & producer (track 8)
- Yonatan Elkayim – guitar & bass (track 9)
- Craig King – keyboards & additional producer (track 11)
- David "DJ Quik" Blake – keyboards (track 14)
- Russ "Finesse" Barber – piano & Fender Rhodes (track 16)

Technicals

- Claudio Cueni – mixing (tracks: 1, 2, 4, 7, 9, 11, 15, 16)
- The Digital Master – mixing (tracks: 3, 5–15)
- Victor Manzano – recording (track 16)
- Marc Regan – mastering
- Paul Holyfield – executive producer

Additional

- Ryan Webster – art design
- Earl "The Maverick" Randolf – photography
- Russell Redeaux – management
