= AmeriKKKa's Most Wanted =

Studio album by Ice Cube
- Released: May 16, 1990
- Recorded: January – March 1990
- Studios: Greene Street (Manhattan, New York City)
- Genres: West Coast hip-hop; gangsta rap; political hip-hop; hardcore hip hop
- Length: 49:36
- Label: Priority
- Producers: The Bomb Squad; Sir Jinx; Ice Cube

Ice Cube chronology
AmeriKKKa's Most Wanted (1990)	Kill at Will (1990)

Singles from AmeriKKKa's Most Wanted
- 1. "AmeriKKKa's Most Wanted" Released: April 17, 1990

AmeriKKKa's Most Wanted is the debut studio album by American rapper Ice Cube, released on May 16, 1990, by Priority Records. It was his first solo album, after an acrimonious split from his former group N.W.A. Primarily produced by Public Enemy's production team the Bomb Squad, the album was a commercial success, peaking at 19 on the Billboard 200, and was certified platinum in the United States on June 23, 1990. It received widespread acclaim upon its release, and is regarded as a hip hop classic and one of the best albums of the 1990s.

== Background ==
=== Conception ===
After departing from Ruthless Records and the West Coast–based group N.W.A, Ice Cube immediately moved to record his own album. Cube maintains that originally, he and N.W.A producer Dr. Dre still wanted to collaborate for Cube's debut solo, but the move was nixed by label powers:

When I went solo, I wanted Dr. Dre to do AmeriKKKa's Most Wanted, but Jerry Heller vetoed that...and I'm pretty sure Eazy didn't want Dre to do it. But Dre did want to do it; we gotta put that on record. Dre wanted to do my record, but it was just too crazy with the break-up [of N.W.A].

— Ice Cube, "Ice Cube, AmeriKKKa's Most Wanted Retrospective [20 Years Later]", XXL

Linking up with Sir Jinx, Dr. Dre's cousin, Cube made use of pre-written notebooks of songs meant for N.W.A member/Ruthless co-founder Eazy-E. After relocating to New York, they worked on the songs, which included "Once Upon a Time in the Projects", "Get Off My Dick & Tell Yo' Bitch to Come Here" and "Gangsta's Fairytale", among others. Ice Cube also recorded the song "Jackin' for Beats", using beats allegedly planned for use on the next N.W.A album, though he would use this several months later on the Kill at Will EP.

After contacting Public Enemy's production team the Bomb Squad, they completed the album. The album received a fair share of production credited to various Bomb Squad members, with an appearance by Public Enemy frontman Chuck D, despite Jinx's claims that the only Bomb Squad member fully present was Eric Sadler. Hank Shocklee spoke on meeting and working with Ice Cube in a Cool'eh Magazine interview:

Cube contacted me wanting to know if we could do a few tracks for his solo album after the whole NWA thing came to what it was and I was like, I'll do it if I can do the whole album. And he said, that's what I was hoping you would say…y'know…and when we were in the studio he showed up with notebooks and notebooks full of new rhymes, a bag full of rhymebooks.

— Hank Shocklee, Cool'eh Magazine

=== Content ===
With socio-political conscious and gangsta rap content, its songs delve into the issues of ghetto life, drug addiction, racism and poverty. Throughout the album, Ice Cube incessantly attacks institutional racism, as well as social norms which directly or indirectly allowed the oppression of those living in the ghettos of Los Angeles to continue. On "Endangered Species (Tales from the Darkside)", he predicts that his neighborhood would become a flash point for violence before 1992's scandal over the beating of Rodney King, and takes police to task for the policies that would later lead to the L.A. riots that resulted.

Throughout the album, Cube takes some controversial stands, referring to certain types of African-Americans as "Oreo cookies", an epithet implying that they appear black on the outside, but have, internally, negative white tendencies. Arsenio Hall is specifically mentioned as being a "sell-out". Cube also heavily criticizes R&B and hip hop radio stations for watered-down broadcasting. The title song directly parodies the television show America's Most Wanted, alleging bias and denouncing the glee the program displays in arresting African-American men.

A later skit, "The Drive By", returns to the same theme at the end, with newscaster Tom Brokaw reporting on rioting, stating: "Outside the south central area, few cared about the violence because it didn't affect them." He also addressed gender relations on "It's a Man's World", a duet between Cube and rapper Yo-Yo. Cube and Yo-Yo verbally spar and trade sexist barbs back and forth in an exposé of sexism between men and women. Amidst critics' accusing Ice Cube of sexism, Peter Watrous of The New York Times wrote, in review of a live show at New York's Apollo Theater:

...no one came out ahead; any new sense of cultural violence or sexism promoted by the record had dissolved into a traditional battle of the sexes, no better or no worse.

== Release ==
AmeriKKKa's Most Wanted initially charted without the support of a lead single or video, although the title track would later receive a pressing, and a rare video for "Who's the Mack?" eventually surfaced. It was directed by Alex Winter.

== Singles ==
The title track was the first official single from the album - the B-side for the song was "Once Upon a Time in the Projects". "Who's the Mack?" was released as a promo single and music video. A remix of the album track "Endangered Species (Tales From The Darkside)" was later released as a single the EP Kill at Will.

== Critical reception ==
Contemporary professional ratings
Review scores
Source	Rating
Entertainment Weekly	B−
NME	7/10
Rolling Stone	2.5/5 stars
The Source	5/5 stars
The Village Voice	B−

In The Washington Post, David Mills wrote that with the album, "Ice Cube has now proven that he was N.W.A.'s crucial element. He's an unusually gifted rhymer ... And his delivery is even more self-assured than it was when he dissed every cop in the nation." The Source commented that Ice Cube's performances are given "the perfect backdrop" by the Bomb Squad, who the magazine said had "really outdone" themselves by integrating "funky pimp type grooves" into their "metallic bum-rush style of beats". Steven Wells of NME felt that while Ice Cube's "political awareness and eloquence" are undermined by his "cock-waving machismo", the latter is somewhat tempered by his "self-deprecating sense of humour", with Wells ultimately calling the album "alternately appalling, refreshing, confused and dynamic".

Writing for Entertainment Weekly, Greg Sandow viewed AmeriKKKa's Most Wanted as "an important social document, but not necessarily cohesive art", nonetheless acknowledging that "Ice Cube emerges as a rapper most original for his uncompromising tone." While deeming the album musically "as original as A Tribe Called Quest, and probably doper", The Village Voice's Robert Christgau found Ice Cube's lyrics generally distasteful "despite his gift for rhyme and narrative". Rolling Stone critic Alan Light declared the album "a disappointment" and said that "the relentless profanity grows wearisome, the Bomb Squad beats lose steam, and Cube's attitudes toward women are simply despicable."

=== Retrospect ===
Retrospective professional ratings
Review scores
Source	Rating
AllMusic	5/5 stars
The Austin Chronicle	5/5 stars
Blender	5/5 stars
Chicago Sun-Times	4/4 stars
Pitchfork	9.0/10
Q	4/5 stars
Rolling Stone	5/5 stars
The Rolling Stone Album Guide	5/5 stars
Spin Alternative Record Guide	9/10
Uncut	4/5 stars

Over the years, the album has received further critical praise, with many regarding it as a hip-hop classic. In a retrospective review, David Jeffries from AllMusic called AmeriKKKa's Most Wanted "a timeless, riveting exercise in anger, honesty, and the sociopolitical possibilities of hip-hop" showing Ice Cube "at his most inspired", crediting the album with helping to "boost the role of the individual in hip-hop." In the 2004 Rolling Stone Album Guide, Peter Relic praised it as "an album of menacing, unflinchingly fierce rhymes that took millions of listeners deep into the terrors of South Central L.A." Alan Light reappraised the album in the liner notes of its 2003 reissue, noting its "musical sophistication, brutal imagery, and relentless intensity" and deeming it "one of the most loved, hated, and pivotal albums in the history of hip-hop." Pitchfork's Eric Harvey called it a "groundbreaking" record that ushered hip hop into "the tabloid decade", concluding that "it was AmeriKKKa as much as Nation of Millions and Straight Outta Compton that laid the groundwork for hip-hop's brief and dramatic evolution into an expansive truth-telling media spectacle."

=== Accolades ===
- (*) signifies unordered lists

Accolades for AmeriKKKa's Most Wanted
Publication	Country	Accolade	Year	Rank
About.com	United States	100 Greatest Hip Hop Albums	2008	33
About.com	United States	Best Rap Albums of 1990	2008	2
Robert Dimery	United States	1001 Albums You Must Hear Before You Die	2005	*
Ego Trip	United States	Hip Hop's 25 Greatest Albums by Year 1980–98	1999	1
The Guardian	United Kingdom	1000 Albums to Hear Before You Die	2007	*
Mixmag	United Kingdom	The 100 Best Dance Albums of All Time	1996	24
New Musical Express	United Kingdom	Albums of the Year	1990	41
Rock De Lux	Spain	Albums of the Year	1990	46
Rolling Stone	United States	The Essential Recordings of the 90s	1999	*
Rolling Stone	United States	The 500 Greatest Albums of All Time	2020	187
The Source	United States	The 100 Best Rap Albums of All Time	1998	*
Spin	United States	Top 100 (+5) Albums of the Last 20 Years	2005	33
Spin	United States	Albums of the Year	1990	1
Spin	United States	Top 90 Albums of the 90s	1999	80
Tom Moon	United States	1000 Recordings to Hear Before You Die	2008	*
Village Voice	United States	Albums of the Year	1990	6

== Legacy ==
Ice Cube's social and political commentary, delivered in an incisive manner, has influenced numerous rappers since AmeriKKKa's Most Wanted, particularly in the gangsta rap and political rap subgenres. Focusing on the hardships of life in South Central, Los Angeles, as well as criticizing the American Justice System and race relations in the United States, Cube became an outspoken voice of U.S. injustice against young Black Americans.

Many notable rappers have been influenced by AmeriKKKa's Most Wanted. His style of rapping about real life sentiment and socio-political awareness influenced the music of West Coast rappers, including that of Tupac Shakur, Ras Kass, and Xzibit, as well as East Coast rappers Nas, The Notorious B.I.G., and more recently, Saigon, JPEGMafia and Southern rapper Young Jeezy. East Coast rapper Redman also covered "Once Upon a Time in the Projects" on his album Doc's Da Name 2000, with the song "Jersey Yo!".

== Commercial performance ==
AmeriKKKas Most Wanted debuted at number 19 on the US Billboard 200 chart. It was certified gold by the Recording Industry Association of America (RIAA) two weeks after it was released for sales of over 500,000 copies. The album was eventually certified platinum four months later on September 16, 1990.

== Track listing ==
All tracks are written by Ice Cube.

AmeriKKKa's Most Wanted Track Listing
No.	Title	Writer(s)	Producer(s)	Length
1.	"Better Off Dead"	O'Shea Jackson; Brian Holt	Ice Cube; Sir Jinx	1:03
2.	"The Nigga Ya Love to Hate"	Jackson; Eric Sadler; George Clinton; Garry Shider; David Spradley; Steve Arrington; Charles Carter; Buddy Hankerson; Roger Parker	The Bomb Squad; Ice Cube (co.); Sir Jinx (co.)	3:13
3.	"AmeriKKKa's Most Wanted"	Jackson; Sadler; Keith Boxley	The Bomb Squad; Ice Cube (co.); Sir Jinx (co.)	4:08
4.	"What They Hittin' Foe?"	Jackson; Alan Gorrie; Weldon Irvine	The Bomb Squad; Ice Cube (co.); Sir Jinx (co.)	1:22
5.	"You Can't Fade Me/JD's Gaffilin"	Jackson; Sadler; Clinton; William Collins	The Bomb Squad; Ice Cube (co.); Sir Jinx (co.)	5:12
6.	"Once Upon a Time in the Projects"	Jackson; Anthony Wheaton; Betty Davis; Bryson Evans; Ricardo Thomas	Sir Jinx; The Bomb Squad (co.)	3:41
7.	"Turn Off the Radio"	Jackson; Sadler; Carlton Ridenhour; Omari Shabazz	The Bomb Squad; Ice Cube (co.); Sir Jinx (co.)	2:37
8.	"Endangered Species (Tales from the Darkside)" (featuring Chuck D)	Jackson; Ridenhour; Clinton; Shider; Sadler; Eddie Hazel	The Bomb Squad; Ice Cube (co.); Sir Jinx (co.)	3:21
9.	"A Gangsta's Fairytale" (featuring Lil Russ)	Jackson; Sadler	Ice Cube; Sir Jinx; The Bomb Squad (co.)	3:16
10.	"I'm Only Out for One Thang" (featuring Flavor Flav)	Jackson; Wheaton; John Marascalco; Leo Price	Ice Cube; Sir Jinx; The Bomb Squad (co.)	2:10
11.	"Get Off My Dick and Tell Yo Bitch to Come Here"	Jackson; Sadler	The Bomb Squad; Ice Cube (co.); Sir Jinx (co.)	0:56
12.	"The Drive-By"	Jackson; Boxley; Wheaton	Sir Jinx	1:01
13.	"Rollin' wit the Lench Mob"	Jackson; Sadler; Boxley; Clinton; Collins; Bernie Worrell	The Bomb Squad; Ice Cube (co.); Sir Jinx (co.)	3:43
14.	"Who's the Mack?"	Jackson; James Brown; Fred Wesley; Clair Pinckney	Sir Jinx; The Bomb Squad	4:35
15.	"It's a Man's World" (featuring Yo-Yo)	Jackson; Wheaton; Brown; Betty Newsome; Yolanda Whitaker	Sir Jinx; Ice Cube	5:26
16.	"The Bomb"	Jackson; Wheaton	Sir Jinx; The Bomb Squad (co.)	3:25
Total length:				49:36

== Personnel ==
- The Bomb Squad – producer
- Mario Castellanos – photography
- Chris Champion – assistant engineer
- Chuck D. – performer
- Da Lench Mob – vocals (background), producer
- (Ex) Cat Heads – vocals (background)
- Flavor Flav – vocals, performer
- Ricky Harris – vocals (background)
- Al Hayes – bass guitar, guitar
- Vincent Henry – flute, saxophone
- Brian Holt – vocals
- Kevin Hosmann – art direction
- Ice Cube – vocals, producer
- Jay Dee – vocals (background)
- Tim Rollins – piano
- Eric Sadler – producer
- Nick Sansano – engineer
- Shannon – vocals (background)
- Christopher Shaw – engineer
- Keith Shocklee – producer
- Sir Jinx – vocals (background), producer
- Chilly Chill – vocals (background), producer
- Howie Weinberg – mastering
- Dan Wood – vocals (background), engineer
- Yo-Yo – vocals, performer

Credits adapted from album liner notes.

== Charts ==
=== Weekly charts ===
Weekly chart performance for AmeriKKKa's Most Wanted
Chart (1990)	Peak position
Australian Albums (ARIA)	49
UK Albums (Official Charts)	48
US Billboard 200	19
US Top R&B/Hip-Hop Albums (Billboard)	6

=== Year-end charts ===
Year-end chart performance for AmeriKKKa's Most Wanted
Chart (1990)	Position
US Billboard 200	82
US Top R&B/Hip-Hop Albums (Billboard)	29

== Certifications ==
Certifications for AmeriKKKa's Most Wanted
Region	Certification	Certified units/sales
United Kingdom (BPI)	Silver	60,000^{‡}
United States (RIAA)	Platinum	1,000,000^{^}
^{^} Shipments figures based on certification alone.^{‡} Sales+streaming figures based on certification alone.
