= Chilly Chill =

American hip hop producer

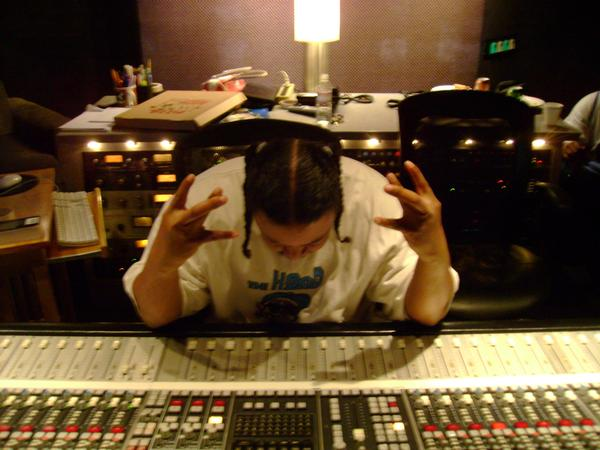
- Chilly Chill working in the studio

Background information
- Born: Derrick Baker
- Origin: Los Angeles, California, U.S.
- Genres: Hip hop, R&B, rock, pop
- Occupations: Music producer, rapper, DJ, radio host
- Years active: 1988–present
- Labels: Priority; Lench Mob; Death Row; East West; Atlantic; Chilly Chill
- Website: chillychill.net

Derrick Baker, also known as Chilly Chill, is an American hip hop music producer who has worked for Ice Cube, Snoop Dogg, Ice-T, Rick James, RBX, Ike Turner, Public Enemy, Kurupt, Jewel, Yo-Yo, WC, Korn, 7th Veil, Kool Keith, Da Lench Mob, Lupe Fiasco, Bun B, and more.

== History ==
Chilly Chill is an original member of the West Coast group the Lench Mob along with Ice Cube, Yo-Yo, Sir Jinx and others. The Lench Mob was formed after Ice Cube left N.W.A. The Lench Mob featured Ice Cube's videos and songs on his debut album Amerikkka's Most Wanted. Chilly Chill produced many of the tracks on that album and also Death Certificate and Kill at Will.

== Credits ==
- Ice Cube – AmeriKKKa's Most Wanted
- Ice Cube – Kill At Will
- Ice Cube – Death Certificate
- Ice Cube – The Predator
- Ice Cube – Bootlegs & B.Sides
- Ice Cube – Greatest Hits
- Ice Cube – The Collection
- Ice Cube – The Albums That Shook A Nation
- Yo Yo – Dope Feminity
- Yo Yo – Make Way For The Motherload
- Yo Yo – Ya Can't Play With My Yo Yo
- Yo Yo – Ain't Nobody Better
- WC and the Maad Circle – Ain't A Damn Thang Changed
- WC and the Maad Circle – You Don't Work, U Don't Eat
- Da Lench Mob – Guerillas In Tha Mist
- Mack 10 – Foe Life
- Very Best Of 89 09 – No Sleep Til Compton
- RBX – The Shining
- RBX feat KORN – Ruff N Nuff
- RBX – Born Wild
- RBX – California
- Kool Keith & HBomb – 7th Veil
- Kool Keith & H Bomb – Stoned
- H Bomb feat Snoop Dogg – What U Gonna Do
- Ice-T feat Chilly Chill – 6am remix
- Kool Keith & HBomb feat Rick James – So Blunted
- HBomb feat Ike Turner – Play It Cool
- Hbomb feat Roscoe Kurupt & Jewell – Money
- HBomb feat Kurupt – About
- HBomb feat Silkk The Shocker – Soldier
- HBomb feat Flava Flav – Fuck The Industry
- Gucci Mane feat Chilly Chill – Ghetto
- Bun B – Pimp Proud
- Epiphany Pictures Inc / Calvin Records – Road Kings soundtrack
- Yo Yo – Stand Up For Your Rights
- Yo Yo – What Can I Do
- WC and the Maad Circle – Dress Code
- WC and the Maad Circle – Ghetto Serenade
- Ice Cube – How To Survive In South Central
- The Ultimate Death Row Collection /Wideawake Death Row Records – Ain't Got No Time
