= Against the Grain (Kurupt album) =

Studio album by Kurupt
- Released: August 23, 2005
- Recorded: 2002–2003
- Genres: West Coast hip hop; gangsta rap
- Length: 68:48
- Labels: Death Row; Koch
- Producers: Baby-C-Style; Blaqthoven; Diverse; Doug Mayhem; Joshua Andrews; Mark Sparks; Ric Rude; Screwface; Sir Jinx; tha Row Hitters

Kurupt chronology
Originals (2004)	Against the Grain (2005)	Same Day, Different Shit (2006)

Professional ratings
Review scores
Source	Rating
AllHipHop	2.5/5
AllMusic	4/5 stars
Now	3/5
PopMatters	1/10
RapReviews	5.5/10

Against the Grain is the fourth solo studio album by American rapper Kurupt. It was released on August 23, 2005, through Death Row Records and Koch Records. The album was produced by Mark Sparks, Doug Mayhem, Sir Jinx, Baby-C-Style, Blaqthoven, Diverse, Joshua Andrews, Ric Rude, Screwface, and tha Row Hitters, with Suge Knight serving as executive producer. It features guest appearances from Eastwood, Tri Star, Young Tone, 2Pac, Dave Hollister, Domination, M.O.P., Potion, Roscoe, Spider Loc, the Dayton Family, and Val C.

The album went almost unnoticed due to the lack of promotion by Koch Records, which distributes all of Tha Row's albums. Additionally, Kurupt had already left Death Row prior to the album's release and had reunited with Snoop Dogg and Daz Dillinger. It debuted at number 60 on the Billboard 200 albums and number 20 on the Top R&B/Hip-Hop Albums chart in the United States. It also made it to number 146 on the French Albums chart. The cut tracks were later released on a 2007 bootleg compilation titled Against tha Grain E.P.. The album was reissued in February 2010, under the title Down and Dirty with a slightly altered tracklist. The song "Calico" previously appeared on the Dayton Family album Family Feud.

== Background ==
Kurupt was signed with Death Row Records as one-half of Tha Dogg Pound together with Daz Dillinger. The duo released the only studio album for the label, Dogg Food in 1995, before Kurupt left the label in late 1997. In early 2002 he re-aligned with Death Row, which sparked the feud with his former labelmates, such as Daz, Snoop Dogg and Soopafly. The album was delay from its planned 2004 release and was released in August 2005, when Kurupt left Death Row for the second time. It was Death Row's first freshly recorded album in over four years. It was the final original album released by the label during its original run, before being revived with BODR by Snoop Dogg 17 years later.

== Track listing ==
No.	Title	Writer(s)	Producer(s)	Length
1.	"Intro"			0:54
2.	"Speak on It" (featuring Val C)	David Williams; Johnathan Marc Blount	Mark Sparks	4:04
3.	"Anarchy '87"	D. Williams	Mark Sparks	4:15
4.	"Throw Back Muzic '86"	D. Williams	Mark Sparks	4:11
5.	"Deep Dishes"	D. Williams; Ricky Lewis	Ric Rude	4:52
6.	"Stalkin'"	D. Williams; Kenji Suzuki; Holger Schüring; Irmin Schmidt; Hans Heinrich Liebezeit; Michael Karoli	Sir Jinx	3:59
7.	"Can U Feel It" (featuring Potion)	D. Williams; Kenton Nix	Doug Mayhem	4:48
8.	"Slide n Slide Out" (featuring Eastwood, Tri Star and Young Tone)	D. Williams; Deshaun Woodard; Eric McKinney; T. McKinney; Anthony Ransom	Blaqthoven	3:42
9.	"I'm Back"	Ricardo Brown; Darren Hubbard	Tha Row Hitters	4:49
10.	"Jealousy" (featuring Roscoe and M.O.P.)	D. Williams; Eric Murray; Jamal Grinnage	Mark Sparks	4:41
11.	"Tha Past" (featuring Dave Hollister)	D. Williams; Albert Vernon Hudson; Albert Lewis Perkins; Cuba Gregory	Doug Mayhem	4:46
12.	"My Homeboys (Back to Back)" (featuring 2Pac and Eastwood)	D. Williams; Tupac Shakur; Woodard; Nathaniel Hale; W. Stewart	Mark Sparks; Diverse	4:16
13.	"Bullshit & Nonsense" (featuring Spider Loc and Eastwood)	D. Williams; Curtis Williams; Woodard; Joshua Andrews	Joshua Andrews	3:20
14.	"Calico" (featuring The Dayton Family)	Ira Dorsey; Jon Henderson; Raheen Peterson; D. Sellers; E. Austin	Screwface Music	4:52
15.	"Hustlin'" (featuring Tri Star and Young Tone)	D. Williams; E. McKinney; T. McKinney; Anthony Wheaton; Norman Whitfield	Sir Jinx	3:45
16.	"It's a Wrap"		Mark Sparks	2:58
17.	"You Fuckin' with the Best" (featuring Domination)		Baby-C-Style	4:08
18.	"Outro"			0:21
Total length:				1:08:41

Notes

- Nearly all of Kurupt's songwriting for this album is credited to his brother, David "Roscoe" Williams.

Sample credits

- Track 6 contains a sample of "Vitamin C" as performed by Can
- Track 12 contains replayed elements of "Me and My Homies" as performed by Nate Dogg

== Charts ==
Chart performance for Against Tha Grain
Chart (2005)	Peak position
French Albums (SNEP)	146
US Billboard 200	60
US Top R&B/Hip-Hop Albums (Billboard)	20
