= Dysfunktional Family (soundtrack) =

Soundtrack album by various artists
- Released: March 11, 2003
- Recorded: 2002–2003
- Studio: Track Record Studios (North Hollywood, Los Angeles)
- Genre: Gangsta rap
- Length: 72:52
- Label: Tha Row; Priority
- Producer: Suge Knight (exec.); 17 Freeze; China Black; Flash Technology; Irv Gotti; Just Blaze; Juvenile; Sir Jinx; Tha Row Hitters

Tha Row Records chronology
Too Gangsta for Radio (2000)	Dysfunktional Family (2003)	The Very Best of Death Row (2005)

Professional ratings
Review scores
Source	Rating
AllMusic	2.5/5 stars
RapReviews	5/10

Dysfunktional Family is the soundtrack to George Gallo-directed 2003 documentary stand-up comedy film Dysfunktional Family. It was released on March 11, 2003 by Tha Row Records. Production was handled by the label's production team, Tha Row Hitters, as well as China Black, Flash Technology, Irv Gotti, Just Blaze, Juvenile, Sir Jinx and Skip "17 Freeze" Wayne. It features contributions from Crooked I, Eastwood, Danny Boy, Ganxsta Ridd, Kurupt, Spider Loc, Ashanti, Gail Gotti, Ja Rule, Jay-Z, Juvenile, Michel'le, N.I.N.A., Virginya Slim, Phobia, Skip "17 Freeze" Wayne, Young Buck, and film star Eddie Griffin. The album was a minor success, peaking at #95 on the Billboard 200, #14 on the Top R&B/Hip-Hop Albums, #6 on the Top Soundtracks and #4 on the Independent Albums.

== Track listing ==
No.	Title	Writer(s)	Producer(s)	Length
1.	"Still Tha Row" (Crooked I and Virginya Slim)	Dominick Wickliffe; Virginia Slimm; Jimmy Jawara Rodgers	Flash Technology	4:39
2.	"I'm Back (Remix)" (Kurupt)	Ricardo Brown; Rodgers; Suge Knight	Tha Row Hitters	4:49
3.	"Dysfunktional Family (Theme)" (Crooked I, Eastwood and Danny Boy)	Wickliffe; Deshaun Woodard; Daniel Steward; David Aveau Devoux; Darren Vegas; S. Knight	Tha Row Hitters	5:00
4.	"Hovi Baby (Remix)" (Jay-Z)	Shawn Carter; Kenneth Edmonds	Just Blaze	4:04
5.	"I'm a Gangsta" (Juvenile, Skip and Young Buck)	Terius Gray; Dennis Clinton Wayne; David Brown; S. Knight; C. Nicholas	17 Freeze; Juvenile	3:48
6.	"We Ballin'" (Eastwood and Crooked I)	Woodard; Wickliffe; Devoux; Vegas; S. Knight; Anderson Haywood Jr	Tha Row Hitters	4:09
7.	"Who Wants to Fuck Tonight" (Eastwood, Crooked I, Danny Boy and Ja Rule)	Woodard; Wickliffe; Steward; Jeffrey Atkins; Rodgers; S. Knight	Tha Row Hitters	5:20
8.	"All My" (Ashanti)	Ashanti Douglas	China Black; Irv Gotti	3:43
9.	"Gangstress (How I Roll)" (Gail Gotti)		Tha Row Hitters	4:28
10.	"Tha Row (Y'all Hoes)" (Eastwood, Spider Loc and Ganxsta Ridd)		Tha Row Hitters	4:12
11.	"I Know Where I'm Going" (Michel'le)	Michel'le Knight; Devoux; Vegas; S. Knight; Eddie Griffin	Tha Row Hitters	3:14
12.	"1 Call (Real Talk)" (Ganxsta Ridd and Kurupt)		Tha Row Hitters	4:17
13.	"Too Street 4 T.V." (N.I.N.A. and Danny Boy)	Steward; Devoux; Vegas; S. Knight	Tha Row Hitters	4:15
14.	"Get Off Tha Block" (Crooked I and Phobia)		Tha Row Hitters	4:20
15.	"On Tha Radio" (Skip)		Tha Row Hitters	4:25
16.	"I Thought U Knew" (Crooked I, Eastwood, Danny Boy and Eddie Griffin)		Tha Row Hitters	3:46
17.	"Dys-Funk-Tional" (Spider Loc and Eddie Griffin)		Sir Jinx	4:23
Total length:				1:12:52

== Charts ==
Chart (2003)	Peak position
US Billboard 200	95
US Top R&B/Hip-Hop Albums (Billboard)	14
US Independent Albums (Billboard)	4
US Top Soundtracks (Billboard)	6
