= Originals (Kurupt album) =

2004 compilation album by the Originals

Compilation album by Originals (Cj Ginavece, Kurupt & Keitarock)
- Released: March 30, 2004
- Genre: Hip hop
- Length: 1:11:26
- Label: Kustapo
- Producer: CJ Ginavece (exec.); Kurupt (exec.); A-1Yola; J. Wells; Kenny McCloud; Mac Truk; Sanjay; Sir Jinx; The Co-Stars

Kurupt chronology
| The Horsemen Project (2003) | Originals (2004) | Against tha Grain (2005) |

Kurupt and Cj Ginavece Present: The Originals is the self-titled debut album by West Coast gangsta rap group Originals, composed of Cj Ginavece, Kurupt and Keitarock. It was released on March 30, 2004, through Kustapo Records. Production was handled by A-1Yola, J. Wells, Mac Truk, Sir Jinx, Kenny McCloud, Co-Stars, Sanjay, with CJ Ginavece and Kurupt serving as executive producers. It features guest appearances from Suga Free, Eastwood, Livewire and Sugga The Mob Boss.

== Track listing ==
| No. | Title | Producer(s) | Length |
|---|---|---|---|
| 1. | "1969" | | 0:56 |
| 2. | "Original" | Kenny McCloud | 3:15 |
| 3. | "Final Testament" | Sir Jinx | 4:27 |
| 4. | "We Bang" | A-1Yola | 4:16 |
| 5. | "Never Give Up" (featuring Suga Free and Sugga The Mob Boss) | A-1Yola | 3:36 |
| 6. | "Break Yo Back" (featuring Suga Free) | A-1Yola | 3:52 |
| 7. | "Major Money" | Mac Truk | 4:35 |
| 8. | "I Didn't Change" | J. Wells | 4:11 |
| 9. | "Keep It True" | A-1Yola | 4:40 |
| 10. | "How U Got Ya Game" | A-1Yola | 3:34 |
| 11. | "I Know" | A-1Yola | 4:21 |
| 12. | "Can't Stop" (featuring Sugga The Mob Boss) | A-1Yola | 4:32 |
| 13. | "CalifornYA" (featuring Eastwood and Livewire) | The Co-Stars | 4:07 |
| 14. | "Y'z Up A'z Down" | J. Wells | 4:57 |
| 15. | "Bang'n My Amps" | Sir Jinx | 3:53 |
| 16. | "They Luv It" | Mac Truk | 4:30 |
| 17. | "Eat a Dicc (Fuck Daz)" (Bonus) | Sanjay | 7:44 |
| Total length: | | | 1:11:26 |

== Personnel ==
- CJ Ginavece – performer (tracks: 1–6, 9–12, 16), executive producer
- Ricardo "Kurupt" Brown – performer (tracks: 1–3, 7–9, 11, 12, 15–17), executive producer
- Keita Rocc – performer (tracks: 1–3, 12, 16, 17)
- Dejuan Louis "Suga Free" Rice – performer (tracks: 5, 6)
- Shane "Sugga The Mob Boss" Hendrix – performer (tracks: 5, 12)
- David "Roscoe" Williams – performer (track 7)
- Anterazh (Eric "Tri Star" McKinney, T. "Young Tone" McKinney and Slo Stallone) – performers (track 13)
- Y.A. (B. "Young Bizzle" Pettaway, Roscoe, Tri Star, S. "YG" Huggins, Slo Stallone and Young Tone) – performers (track 14)
- Deshaun "Eastwood" Woodard – performer (tracks: 13, 17)
- LiveWire – performer (track 13)
- Kenneth McCloud – producer (track 2)
- Anthony "Sir Jinx" Wheaton – producer (tracks: 3, 15)
- Hieroshi "A-1Yola" Maddox – producer (tracks: 4–6, 9–12)
- Damon "Mac Truk" White – producer (tracks: 7, 16)
- Jon "J. Wells" Henderson – producer (tracks: 8, 14)
- Co-Stars (Neely Dinkins Jr. and Vito Colapietro) – producers (track 13)
- Sanjay – producer (track 17)
