= G-Funk (film) =

- Directed by: Karam Gill
- Produced by: Gary Ousdahl, Warren G, Rafael Chavez, Bob Ruggeri
- Distributed by: YouTube Premium
- Release dates: March 11, 2017 (South by Southwest); July 11, 2018 (YouTube Premium)
- Running time: 87 minutes
- Country: United States
- Language: English

G-Funk is a 2017 documentary film distributed by YouTube Premium. The film uses previously unreleased archival footage to describe the rise of g-funk in the early 1990s. It features interviews with Warren G, Snoop Dogg, Chuck D, Ice Cube, Ice-T, Too Short, The D.O.C., Wiz Khalifa and others. The film was produced by Gary Ousdahl, Warren G, Rafael Chavez and Bob Ruggeri.
