= PMD =

PMD may refer to:

== Government and diplomacy ==
- Pakistan Meteorological Department
- Performance Management Division, of the Cabinet Office, Government of India
- Possible Military Dimensions of a nuclear program (specifically that of Iran)

== Health ==
- Pelizaeus–Merzbacher disease, a central nervous system disorder
- Pellucid marginal degeneration, a degenerative eye disease

== Places ==
- Palmdale, California, mostly in hip-hop culture known as "the PMD"
- LA/Palmdale Regional Airport (IATA: PMD), a commercial airport in Palmdale, California

== Science ==
- p-Menthane-3,8-diol, the largest constituent in an insect repellent derived from the lemon eucalyptus tree
- Polarization mode dispersion, a form of modal dispersion of light

== Technology ==
- Pistolet maszynowy dywersyjny, a 1939 Polish machine pistol design
- PMD (software), code analyzer for Java
- PMD 85, 8-bit personal computer produced in Czechoslovakia
- Professional Music Driver, a music driver for personal computers utilising Music Macro Language
- Personal Mobility Device, a personal transporter
- A 3D model used by MikuMikuDance, an animation software for Vocaloid's singers
- Photonic Mixer Device
- Physical Medium Dependent, an Ethernet Layer 1 (PHY) sub-layer
- The file name extension for PageMaker documents
- Pre-metal dielectric, a component of the back end of line stage in integrated circuit fabrication

== Other ==
- Pokémon Mystery Dungeon, a video game series
- PMD (rapper), member of group EPMD and solo artist
- PMD Technologies, a German company using photonic mixer devices (PMD)
- Phi Mu Delta, a men's social fraternity
- Pakistan MNP Database (Guarantee) Limited, a system which maintains Pakistan's central number portability clearinghouse
