= Against tha Grain E.P. =

Against tha Grain – The E.P.

EP by Kurupt
- Released: May 7, 2007
- Recorded: 2003–2004
- Genre: West Coast hip hop
- Length: 31:06
- Label: Tha Row
- Producer: Suge Knight

Against tha Grain – The E.P. is an EP bootleg compilation that consists of the songs that Kurupt and Koch Records removed from Against tha Grain, as well as other filler tracks that had nothing to do with the original release. The diss records were recorded in 2003-'04 however they were not released because after making up with Snoop Dogg and the rest of Tha Dogg Pound, Kurupt did not want to see any backlash for his previously recorded diss songs for Death Row Records and since he had just made a deal with Koch to release Tha Dogg Pound's reunion album, they removed the songs from the retail version of Against Tha Grain. A group of Death Row and 2Pac fanatics who operated under the name "For The People Entertainment" were able to purchase these tracks from someone who had access to them. They were released online in digital format, and Kurupt has gone on record saying it was in poor taste to do, and just done to cause drama.

== Track listing ==
| No. | Title | Length |
|---|---|---|
| 1. | "Intro" |
| 2. | "Against tha Grain" (featuring Eastwood and tha Pentagon) |
| 3. | "U Don't Know Who U Fuckin' Wit" (featuring Kokane) |
| 4. | "No Vaseline Part 2 (Intro)" |
| 5. | "No Vaseline Part 2" |
| 6. | "One Thangs Fo Sho'" |
| 7. | "One Thangs Fo Sho' (Reprise)" (featuring Danny Boy) |
| 8. | "Holocaust 3000" (featuring Eastwood, Gail Gotti and Virginya Slim) |
| 9. | "Just U & Me" |
| 10. | "Outro" |
| Total length: | | 31:06 |
