= J. Wells =

American record producer and rapper

- Also known as: J Roc
- Born: Jon Wells; 1983 (age 42–43); Chicago, Illinois, United States
- Origin: Los Angeles, California
- Genres: Hip hop
- Occupations: Record producer; rapper; record executive; businessman
- Years active: 1999–present
- Labels: Universal; Bonzi Records; Fontana Distribution; Ingrooves; Capitol Records; Priority Records
- Website: http://bonzirecords.com

Jon Wells (born 1983) is an American record producer, record executive, and rapper. He is a member of the Likwit Crew.

== Biography ==
Wells was born and raised in Chicago but moved to California, then later to Atlanta, Georgia when he was young. He took the alias "J Roc" when he began rapping in local clubs. A high school friend introduced him to K-Boogs, Young and DJ7 with whom he later formed the group Rocswell, as well as a production company under the same name - Rocswell Entertainment. The group recorded its first album Chilahyork in 1997 which sold 5,000 copies. A second album, Tha Classiks, was released in 1999 and sold 8,000 copies.

In 2000 Wells began producing a Dallas-based hip hop group called Virus and they briefly signed with Warner Brothers in 2001, before being dropped from the label. As a result, the group's first album Outbreak was never released and shelved indefinitely.

In 2001 Wells was invited to join the group Likwit Crew, which includes: Xzibit, Tha Alkaholiks, (E-Swift, J Ro, Tash), King Tee, Lootpack, Phil Da Agony, and Defari, who in 2002 toured with Snoop Dogg's Puff Puff Pass tour, where he met Kurupt from the Dogg Pound (with whom he later formed a duo and released an album). He went on to work on the Wolfpac's Roger Troutman Project and put together his own Wolf Pac Mix tape Volume One which featured artists such as James Debarge, Kurupt, Tha Alkaholiks, Shyheim and Sunz of Man. It sold 25,000 copies.

In 2005, after creative differences with Wolfpac Records, Wells launched another record label, Bonzi Records, before releasing his debut album, Digital Master which featured: Bishop Lamont, Method Man, Mitchy Slick, Goodie Mob, Tha Liks, Jayo Felony, Kurupt, Roscoe, and Planet Asia. The same year Wells produced the Goodie Mob single, "Play Yo Flutes", featuring Sleepy Brown

Wells produced Work It Out on Keyshia Cole's album Just like You in 2007. He also produced songs for Snoop Dogg's EP and animated DVD The Adventures of The Blue Carpet Treatment, as well as music used on TV shows such as, The Sopranos and Six Feet Under, and for the film Be Cool directed by F. Gary Gray.

His songs are also feature in the video games: EA Sports 2004 Tiger Woods Golf, and EA Sports 2006 Fight Night, as well as commercials for major corporations including McDonald's, Smirnoff, Starbucks, and Coors Light. He released his collaboration album with Kurupt, Digital Smoke under his own label Bonzi Records / Fontana Distribution.

He went on to release Digital Master Vol. 2.1 in 2009 which featured: Snoop Dogg, Estelle, Rah Digga, WC, Mack 10, and Da Brat. The single "Already Famous" featuring Da Brat and Kurupt was released on Bonzi Records in March 2009. The video was released without Da Brat due to her incarceration in the Georgia state prison. In 2016 Wells formed rap group Stylz & Wells with Likwit Crew member Styliztik Jones the duo released a music video for lead single "Involved" in August 2017. The duo announced signing a label deal with Capitol Records's Priority Records in October 2017. The duo released their first single on S & W Recordings / Priority Records entitled "Involved" via Spotify, Tidal, Apple Music, and other online retailers on November 8, 2017.

== Establishing Bonzi Records ==
Bonzi Records is an American record label founded by Wells. Fontana Distribution is the distributor for Bonzi. In 2005 after leaving Wolfpac Records, Wells established Bonzi Records and began to release a series of rap music compilations to establish the new brand. In 2006 the label went on to sign a distribution deal with Fontana Distribution, and in 2007 released a Kurupt collaboration album Digital Smoke. In 2010 Bonzi began ushering in more acts through a joint venture deal with Ingrooves. Through the venture Wells worked as executive producer for D. Woods of Danity Kane, Kokane, Ray J, Sir Michael Rocks of The Cool Kids, Ruff Ryders, Dope House Records, King Chip, and Lil' Scrappy. In 2012 Bonzi Records in partnership with Ingrooves released Lil Scrappy's The Grustle.

== Productions discography ==
- West Coast All Stars - Still Mo Bounce (2000)
  - "Crushed Grapes" ft. Merciless Stylz, K Boogs
- J-Ro - "What U Lookin' At?" (single, 2002)
- Wolfpac Records Presents: Still More Bou (2002)
  - "Grape Juice" ft. Merciless Stylz, K. Boogs
- Hieroglyphics present "One Big Trip" (2003)
  - J Ro - "What U Lookin' At?"
- Roscoe- Young Roscoe Philaphornia (2003)
  - "Get Low"
  - "Trouble"
- J. Wells Presents: The Wolfpac Mixtape (full album) (2004)
- Shyheim - The Greatest Story Never Told (2004)
  - "160.15"
- Goodie Mob - One Monkey Don't Stop No Show (2004)
  - "Play Your Flutes" ft. Sleepy Brown, Kurupt
- Kurupt - Kurupt Presents The Originals (2004)
  - "I Didn't Change"
  - "Y'z Up A'z Down"
- Planet Asia - The Grand Opening (2004)
  - "It's All Big"
- The Sopranos "All Happy Families..." series episode music - Roscoe's "Nothin But Trouble" (2004)
- Six Feet Under series episode music (2001–2005)
- Tiger Woods PGA Tour 2004 EA Sports video game soundtrack - Roscoe's "Nothin But Trouble"
- Fight Night Round 3 EA Sports video game soundtrack - Roscoe's "Nothin But Trouble" (2006)
- Digital Master (full album) (2005)
- Be Cool soundtrack (2005)
  - Planet Asia featuring Kurupt - "G'z & Soldiers"
- Prodigal Sunn - Return Of The Prodigal Sunn (2005)
  - "Procrastinators" ft. Freemurder, Young Masta, Bonzi J. Wells
- Digital Smoke (with Kurupt) (full album) (2007)
- Keyshia Cole - Just like You (platinum) (2007)
  - "Work It Out"
- stic.man of Dead Prez - Manhood
  - "Black Girl Shine"
  - "Independent Hustler"
- Canibus - For Whom The Beat Tolls (2007)
  - "702-386-5397"
  - "Javelin Fangz"
- J-Ro - Rare Earth B-Boy Funk Vol.2 (2007)
  - "It Don't Stop"
  - "Akser"
- Rza's - "Afro Samurai" (2007)
  - "Caught Up" (as performed by Black Knights (rap group))
- Snoop Dogg - "The Great Adventures of The Blue Carpet Treatment" DVD Tha Blue Carpet Treatment Mixtape (2007)
  - "Listen" (All My Bitches)
- Ralph Myerz -"Ralphorama" (2008)
  - "We Don't Give A Fuck" Feat. WC
  - "Summertime Heat""
- Tash -Control Freek (2009)
  - "A Penny For My Thoughts (feat. Samuel Christian)"
- Rakim -The Seventh Seal (2009)
  - "You and I"
- D. Woods - "Legalize Me" - single (2009)
  - Executive Producer
- Bizarre - Friday Night At St. Andrew's (2010)
  - "School Teacher"
- Stacee Adamz - Katharsis (Street Album) (2010)
  - "Late Nite Ridin'"
- Kokane - Gimme All Mine (2010)
  - Executive Producer
- Talib Kweli Presents: Strong Arm Steady • "Arms & Hammers" (2011)
  - "Smoking Drinking" (Bonus Track)
- Jay Rock - "Do You Know Me" - Mixtape (2011)
  - "Do You Know" Feat. Kokane
- Terminal 3 Presents "The Academy" "Kurupt's Welcome To The Academy" (2011)
  - Executive Producer
- Lil Scrappy - The Grustle (2012)
  - Executive Producer
- Sir Michael Rocks of The Cool Kids - "Lap of Lux" (2012)
  - Co- Executive Producer
- Sir Michael Rocks of The Cool Kids - "While You Wait" mixtape (2013)
  - "Hold On, Hold Up"
- Kurupt - "Money, Bitches, Power" (2013)
  - "Money (Do It For Me)
  - Produced with DJ Battlecat & Knotch
- Kurupt - "Single" (2015)
  - "Shuv It" Feat. Roscoe
- T.I. Presents: "Hustle Gang" - "We Want Smoke" (2017)
  - "Do No Wrong" Feat. Young Dro & Brycce
  - Co-Producer
- Stylz & Wells - "VIBES" (2017)
  - "Bottles"
- Stylz & Wells - "VIBES" (2018)
  - "Involved"
- Too Short - "The Sex Tape" (2018)
  - "I Aint Throwin No" Feat. Mowii The Rejects
- Nivea - Mirrors (2019)
  - "Flower Power"
- Stylz & Wells - "VIBES" (2019)
  - "VIBES" Feat. Too $hort
- Stylz & Wells - "VIBES" (2020)
  - "Product of the Ghetto" Feat. Nipsey Hussle
- Stylz & Wells - "VIBES" (2020)
  - Full Album

== Discography ==
- Rocswell - Chilahyork (1999)
- Marley Marl - Re-Entry (2001)
  - "Foundation Symphony" feat. J. Wells, Larry-O, Miss Man, Seven Shawn(produced by J-Force)
  - "So Good" feat. J. Wells, Edwin Birdsong (produced by Marley Marl)
- Rocswell - Tha Classiks (2002)
- J. Wells - "Presents Wolfpac Mixtape" - (2003)
- J. Wells - Digital Master Vol.1 (2005)
- Kurupt and J. Wells - Digital Smoke (2007)
- J. Wells - Digital Master Vol. 2.1 (2009)
- Inebriated (TBD)

== Filmography ==
- Mindbenders - Number Two
- Grand Theft Auto V - MC Clip, The Local Population (voice)

== Commercials music composed by ==
- McDonald's
- Smirnoff
- Starbucks
- Coors Light
- HTC
- Dr. Dre's Beats Electronics
