= The Frank and Jess Story =

Studio album by Kurupt and Roscoe
- Released: September 30, 2008
- Recorded: 2007–08
- Studio: High Powered Studio's
- Genre: West Coast hip hop; gangsta rap; hardcore hip hop
- Length: 59:50
- Label: High Powered Entertainment
- Producer: John Silva (also exec.); Ian De Lile; M.A.S.; Tek Nizzle

Kurupt and Roscoe chronology
The Frank and Jess Story (2008)	Tha Tekneek Files (2009)

Kurupt chronology
Sleepless City Livin (2007)	The Frank and Jess Story (2008)	BlaQKout (2009)

Roscoe chronology
I Luv Cali (2006)	The Frank and Jess Story (2008)	Armz Up (2008)

Singles from The Frank and Jess Story
- 1. "Break It Down Like" Released: September 2, 2008

The Frank and Jess Story is the first collaborative studio album by American rapper Kurupt and his younger brother Roscoe. It was released on September 30, 2008, via High Powered Entertainment. Recording sessions took place at High Powered Studio's. Production was handled by John Silva, who also served as executive producer, Ian De Lile, M.A.S. and Tek Nizzle. It features guest appearances from Kokane, Daz Dillinger, Gail Gotti, Rob Quest, Tony Mack, Too $hort, A-Dubb and Jay Townsend.

The album's title is inspired after American guerillas Frank James and Jesse James.

The album did not reach the US Billboard 200, however, it peaked at number 82 on the Top R&B/Hip-Hop Albums chart. It was supported with the only single, "Break It Down Like", which was released on September 2, 2008.

== Critical reception ==
Professional ratings
Review scores
Source	Rating
HipHopDX	3/5
RapReviews	6.5/10

Susan Kim of RapReviews wrote: "it's not a DPG classic, but the skills that are present and the guest appearances made still make it worthwhile". Omar Burgess of HipHopDX also nodded to the DPG discography, saying: "it's not a must-have, but it's a respectable addition to their distinguished catalogue". AllMusic's Matt Rinaldi called the album "a bonafide gangsta extravaganza on wax".

== Track listing ==
No.	Title	Producer(s)	Length
1.	"Intro"	John Silva	1:27
2.	"Hate on Me" (featuring Kokane)	John Silva	4:23
3.	"Break It Down Like" (featuring Too $hort)	John Silva; Ian De Lile	4:26
4.	"Game Been Missin" (featuring Daz Dillinger)	John Silva	4:13
5.	"All I Need" (featuring Daz Dillinger and Jay Townsend)	John Silva	4:14
6.	"I Like Dem Girl's" (featuring Gail Gotti)	John Silva	3:25
7.	"Where Ya Gonna Go" (featuring Kokane)	John Silva	4:38
8.	"Bustin'"	John Silva	5:42
9.	"I Miss U" (featuring Gail Gotti)	John Silva	4:18
10.	"Smashin'"	John Silva	2:44
11.	"Lap Dance"	John Silva	3:52
12.	"No Time to Waste" (featuring Kokane, Rob Quest and T–Mac)	M.A.S.; John Silva	4:25
13.	"Gone from the Ghetto"	John Silva	3:05
14.	"Break It Down Like" (Kurupted G-Mix)	John Silva; Ian De Lile	4:40
15.	"I Got U" (featuring A-Dubb)	Tek Nizzle	4:18
Total length:			59:50

== Personnel ==
- Ricardo "Kurupt" Brown – vocals
- David "Roscoe" Williams – vocals (tracks: 2, 4–6, 8–13, 15)
- Jerry Buddy "Kokane" Long Jr. – vocals (tracks: 2, 7, 12)
- Todd "Too $hort" Shaw – vocals (track 3)
- Delmar "Daz Dillinger" Arnaud – vocals (tracks: 4, 5)
- Jay Townsend – vocals (track 5)
- JoVan "Gail Gotti" Brumfield Brown – vocals (tracks: 6, 9)
- Robert "Rob Quest" McQueen – vocals (track 12)
- Luster "Tony Mac" Tone – vocals (track 12)
- A-Dubb – vocals (track 15)
- John Silva – producer (tracks: 1–14), recording, mixing, executive producer
- Ian De Lile – guitars (tracks: 1, 2, 7, 9, 11, 12, ), producer (tracks: 3, 14), recording
- Mark Anthony Smith – producer (track 12), recording
- Daniel "Tek Nizzle" Wayne – producer (track 15)
- Don P – recording
- Ghazi Shami – mastering
- Alwyn Geiser IV – co-executive producer

== Charts ==
Chart (2008)	Peak position
US Top R&B/Hip-Hop Albums (Billboard)	82
