= Kurupt =

American rapper and producer (born 1972)

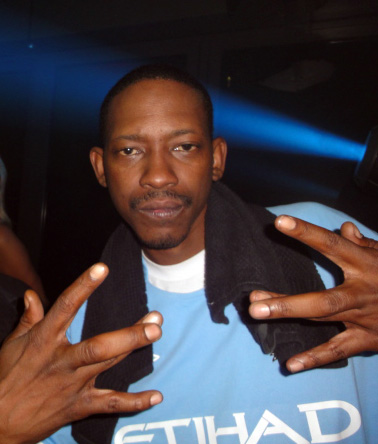
- Kurupt in 2011

Background information
- Also known as: Young Gotti; Kurupt tha Kingpin
- Born: Ricardo Emmanuel Brown; November 23, 1972 (age 53); Philadelphia, Pennsylvania, U.S.
- Origin: Hawthorne, California, U.S.
- Genres: West Coast hip-hop; gangsta rap; G-funk
- Occupations: Rapper; songwriter; record producer; actor
- Works: Kurupt discography
- Years active: 1991–present
- Labels: Death Row; Interscope; Antra; A&M; Artemis; D.P.G.; Heritage Music
- Member of: Tha Dogg Pound; The Hrsmn; D.P.G.C.
- Spouse: Jovan Brown (m. 2007–2017)
- Partner(s): Foxy Brown (1997–1999); Natina Reed (2000–2002)
- Children: 8

Ricardo Emmanuel Brown (born November 23, 1972), better known by his stage name Kurupt, is an American rapper and record producer. Born in Philadelphia and raised in Hawthorne, California, he formed Tha Dogg Pound in 1992 along with Daz Dillinger; the rap duo has released eight albums. He also formed the hip-hop group The Hrsmn in 1996, with whom he has released two albums. His debut solo album, Kuruption! (1998) was released by A&M Records and peaked at number eight on the Billboard 200.

== Personal life ==
Ricardo Emmanuel Brown was born in Philadelphia. He moved to Greater Los Angeles at age 16, first to Hawthorne, then to Los Angeles at age 18.

He was engaged to rapper Foxy Brown from 1997 to 1999. In the early 2000s, he was engaged to Natina Reed; the couple separated in 2002, following the birth of their son Tren Brown. In 2007, Brown married Jovan Brown, who filed for divorce in 2017. That same year, he began dating Toni Calvert. The couple appeared on Marriage Boot Camp's 17th season in 2020.

== Music career ==
Kurupt debuted as a recording artist via three songs on the S.O.S. Band's 1991 album One of Many Nights.

=== Death Row Records ===
Kurupt first met rapper Snoop Doggy Dogg in 1991 at age 19 at a rap showcase at The Roxy Theatre. After the show, a woman challenged Snoop’s group and brought out Kurupt to battle them. Kurupt outrapped everyone, prompting Snoop to step in. The two battled intensely for 15–20 minutes before realizing neither was gaining ground. They ended the battle by showing mutual respect, complimenting each other’s skills, and Snoop told Kurupt that if he ever made it, he’d help him get on—marking the beginning of their relationship. After Snoop made his debut appearance on the 1992 song "Deep Cover" with record producer Dr. Dre and rose to prominence, he introduced Kurupt to Dre at Dre's birthday party at his house. After performing at the party, he subsequently joined Dre and his manager Suge Knight's new fledgling label, Death Row Records, in 1992.

At Death Row, Kurupt joined a roster of artists—including Daz Dillinger, Lady of Rage, Snoop Dogg, Nate Dogg, and RBX—who entered the mainstream by their features on Dr. Dre's debut solo album The Chronic. Kurupt and Daz soon teamed as a rap duo, Tha Dogg Pound, featured on Snoop Dogg's debut solo album, Doggystyle, in the song "For All My Niggaz & Bitchez".

By 1996, the rap genre's East Coast–West Coast rivalry was escalating, spurred on by Death Row's CEO Suge and by rapper 2Pac, new to the label, who believed that a Bad Boy Records circle, in their hometown New York City, had fostered his November 1994 shooting there. Tha Dogg Pound released the single "New York, New York," featuring Snoop Dogg, slighting the city. The duo's debut album, Dogg Food, produced by Daz and mixed by Dre, drew favorable reviews and good sales.

=== Career after Death Row ===
2Pac's 1996 murder triggered an exodus of artists from Death Row Records. Preceded only by Dr. Dre, Kurupt was second to leave. He then signed with A&M Records, where he co-founded the imprint Antra Records with Philadelphia-based attorney Joseph M. Marrone, releasing his debut solo album Kuruption! in 1998. Kurupt released his second album, Tha Streetz Iz a Mutha, featuring the diss track "Calling Out Names", in which Kurupt insults New York rap figures Ja Rule, 50 Cent, Irv Gotti, and DMX, accusing the latter of having an affair with Kurupt's then-fiancée Foxy Brown.

During this time, he linked up with Ras Kass, Wu-Tang Clan-affiliate Killah Priest, and Canibus to form a new group, The HRSMN, although, despite promises of forthcoming material, has released only an unfinished white label.

While Death Row owned rights to Tha Dogg Pound name, Kurupt and Daz operated as the DPG (Dogg Pound Gangstaz), and also with a larger group, including Nate Dogg, Snoop Dogg, Soopafly, and others intermittently, altogether the DPGC (Dogg Pound Gangsta Clique). Daz and Kurupt, as the DPG, released Dillinger & Young Gotti, which received lukewarm reviews. Kurupt's following solo album, Space Boogie: Smoke Oddessey, with production by Daz and by up-and-coming producer Fredwreck, and released by Artemis Records, fared better. Kurupt's then-fiancée, the late Natina Reed, performed the hook of its single "It's Over".

=== Return to Death Row ===
In early 2002, an unofficial remix/compilation album titled 2002, by Tha Dogg Pound, provoked questions about the duo's relationship with Death Row. Soon becoming its vice president, Kurupt signed again to Death Row. Given Daz's especial enmity for Death Row's mogul Knight, Kurupt and Daz began feuding, repeatedly bashing each other on records and in interviews.

In 2003, Kurupt released DJ Tomekk the single Ganxtaville Pt. III and placed fifth on the German charts, as well as in the charts of Austria and Switzerland.

While mentoring Death Row's new artists, including Spider Loc, Crooked I, and Eastwood, Kurupt began his next album, Against tha Grain. Further, he formed a new group, The Riflemen, consisting of Kurupt, Mobb Deep, Jayo Felony, 40 Glocc, and The Alchemist, although the likelihood of a record from this ensemble increasingly slimmed. In 2004, after repeated delays of Kurupt's forthcoming solo album Originals, a bootleg version was released, alike those of Crooked I and other Death Row artists.

It was later revealed that Kurupt was more stung by his feud with Daz than he had acknowledged. In April 2005, at a West Coast unity event hosted by Snoop Dogg, with Snoop as liaison, Kurupt and Daz reconciled and restored their rap duo under its original moniker, Tha Dogg Pound. In August 2005, Kurupt's long delayed album Against tha Grain was released, once Kurupt had already left Death Row a second time; he would publicly denounce the disses that he had included on the album, but an EP called Against tha Grain E.P. surfaced in 2007, containing said disses.

=== Dogg Pound reunited and HRSMN returns ===
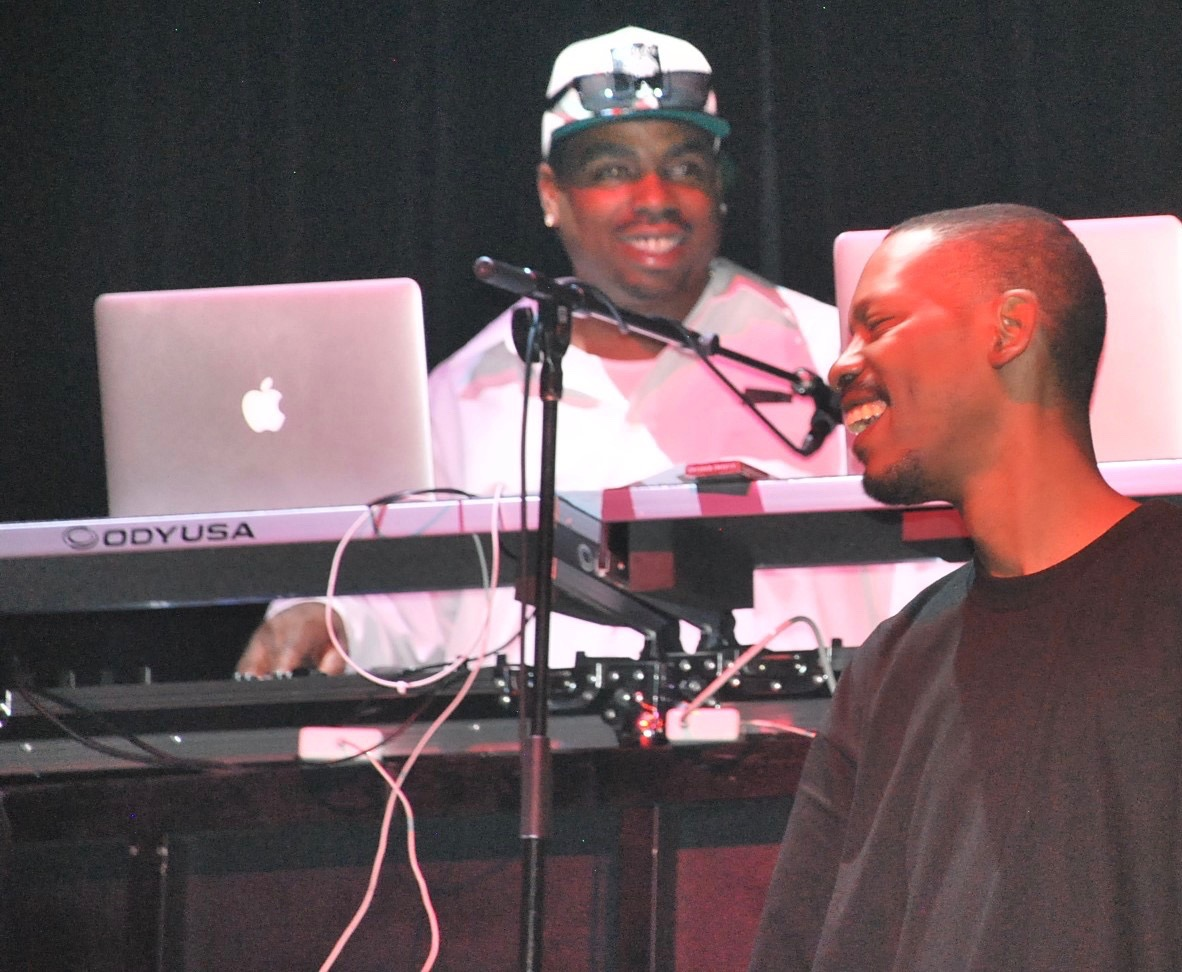
Kurupt with Daz Dillinger in 2015

Kurupt and Daz released Dillinger & Young Gotti II: The Saga Continuez in 2005, Cali iz Active (as DPG with Snoop Dogg) in 2006, and Dogg Chit in 2007; while Kurupt originally touted Dogg Chit as the heir to Dogg Food's legacy, he later stated that none of the group's then intermittent releases were to be considered actual albums—more like mixtapes – and that then upcoming 100 Wayz (originally titled Westcoast Aftershocc) was to be considered the second actual Dogg Pound release. In 2006, he also appeared on Snoop Dogg's album Tha Blue Carpet Treatment. After putting out Digital Smoke with J. Wells in 2007, Kurupt released an album with his younger brother Roscoe titled The Frank and Jess Story in 2008. He also appeared on Snoop Dogg's 2008 album Ego Trippin'.

Before 100 Wayz was released in 2010, Tha Dogg Pound's Gangsta Grillz mixtape premiered, hosted by DJ Drama, followed by an album called BlaQKout with DJ Quik on April 28, 2009. The BlaQKout single, "Fuck Y'all," is a diss to former Quik partners AMG, Hi-C and 2nd II None. During this time, Kurupt was featured on many tracks with other independent artists, and released Streetlights, his first solo album in four years, on April 20, 2010. In 2011, Kurupt started recording with MC Eiht, King T, Jayo Felony, B.G. Knocc Out, Tha Chill, and Sir Jinx for a hip-hop group project called "1st Generation".

In 2012, Kurupt announced plans to release the long anticipated HRSMN project, The Academy, a compilation of collaborations between various artists, and guest featured alongside Slaughterhouse and Big Dave on the single "Hey Girl" from Rocko's debut album Self Made. Following the death of his son Tren's mother (Natina Reed of R&B girl group Blaque) in a car accident in Atlanta, the planned release of the DJ Nik Bean-hosted mixtape, Money, Bitches, Power on November 7, 2012 was delayed. The mixtape, which features E-40, Crooked I, Masta Killa, RBX, Ty Dolla Sign, The Rejectz and more, was released on May 1, 2013. In early 2015, Kurupt released another hit single called "I.M.O." (In My Opinion) with hip-hop rapper and producer KingThaRapper, signed under Famous Music Group. Kurupt was featured in the 2017 song by Jhené Aiko which consisted of a voicemail dedicated to her along with two music videos. In May 2021, it was announced that the long delayed HRSMN project would finally be delivered to fans. The album, now titled The Last Ride, was released on June 18, 2021. Kurupt was featured on the track "Curse of Canaan" from Vinnie Paz's album Tortured in the Name of God's Unconditional Love in 2022.

=== Influence and legacy ===
Kendrick Lamar cited Kurupt in a 2013 interview as one of his three most significant influences, alongside 2Pac and Ice Cube. Eminem stated in his song "'Till I Collapse" that he views Kurupt as one of the best rappers of all time, saying "I got a list—here's the order of my list that it's in, it goes Reggie, Jay-Z, 2Pac and Biggie, Andre from Outkast, Jada, Kurupt, Nas, and then me". Kool Moe Dee ranked Kurupt at No. 39 on his selection of his all-time best MCs in his 2003 book There's a God on the Mic.

== Discography ==
Studio albums

- Kuruption! (1998)
- Tha Streetz Iz a Mutha (1999)
- Space Boogie: Smoke Oddessey (2001)
- Against the Grain (2005)
- Same Day, Different Shit (as Young Gotti) (2006)
- Streetlights (2010)
- Tales from My Hood (2026)

Collaborative albums

- The Horsemen Project (with The Hrsmn) (2003)
- Digital Smoke (with J. Wells) (2007)
- The Frank and Jess Story (with Roscoe) (2008)
- Blaqkout (with DJ Quik) (2009)
- Tha Tekneek Files (with Roscoe) (2009)
- We Got Now and Next (with Diirty OGz) (2016)
- The Last Ride (with The Hrsmn) (2021)
- Don't Be Stupid (with C-Mob) (2022)
- The Godbody LP (with Rakim and Masta Killa) (2026)
- The Hollow (with Snoop Dogg) (2026)

== Filmography ==
=== Film ===
Year	Title	Role	Notes
1995	Murder Was the Case	Small Change from Philly	Video
2001	The Wash	Maniac	
2002	Half Past Dead	Bernard "Twitch"	
2002	Dark Blue	Darryl Orchard	
2003	Keepin' It Real	Raw-D	
2003	Hollywood Homicide	Oliver "K-Ro" Robidoux	
2004	I Accidentally Domed Your Son	Krego	
2004	Johnson Family Vacation	Himself	
2005	Brothers in Arms	Kansas	
2006	Cut Off	Joker	
2007	Half Past Dead 2	Bernard "Twitch"	Video
2008	Loaded	Jimmy Dyson	
2008	Vice	T.J. Greene	
2008	The Adventures of Tha Blue Carpet Treatment	Himself (voice)	
2008	Days of Wrath	Bobby	
2009	A Day in the Life	"Murder"	
2010	The Penthouse	'Strangers' Host	
2017	The White Sistas	Terry	
2018	Bachelor Lions	Beat Masta G	
2018	A Talent for Trouble	Himself	

=== Television ===
Year	Title	Role	Notes
2003	Fastlane	Fallon	Episode: "Dosed"
2017	Grown Folks	Normal Eyes Joe	Episode: "Snitches Get Stitches"

=== Video game ===
Year	Title	Role
2013	Grand Theft Auto V	The Local Population (voice)

=== Documentary ===
Year	Title
2000	Straight from the Streets
2000	The Up In Smoke Tour
2002	Eazy-E: The Life and Timez of Eric Wright
2003	C-Walk: It's a Way of Livin'
2003	Beef
2003	Tupac: Resurrection
2006	DPG Eulogy
2006	Rap Sheet: Hip-Hop and the Cops
2011	Tupac Shakur: Thug Angel 2
2012	Uprising: Hip Hop and the LA Riots
2017	G-Funk
2022	The D.O.C

== Grammy Award nominations ==
Kurupt has been nominated for one Grammy Award as a member of tha Dogg Pound.

Category	Song	Year	Result
Grammy Award for Best Rap Performance by a Duo or Group	"What Would You Do"	1996	Nominated
