= Roscoe (rapper) =

American rapper

- Also known as: Scoe
- Born: David Brown Williams; 1983 (age 42–43); Philadelphia, Pennsylvania, U.S.
- Origin: Los Angeles, California, U.S.
- Genres: Hip hop; gangsta rap; G-funk
- Occupations: Rapper
- Years active: 1999–present
- Labels: Priority Records; Capitol Records; Doggystyle

David Brown Williams (born 1983), better known by his stage name Roscoe, is an American rapper.

He released his debut album, Young Roscoe Philaphornia, in 2003, with the album debuting at #148 on the Billboard 200.

== Career ==
Roscoe was initially introduced to hip hop by his older brother Kurupt. At the time, Kurupt was signed to Death Row Records and was working on his debut album Dogg Food as one member of Tha Dogg Pound. Roscoe made his first appearance on his brother's album Tha Streetz Iz a Mutha, featuring on the vocals "I Call Shots" and "Girls All Pause" along with Nate Dogg. Daz Dillinger was impressed with Roscoe and helped to produce his debut mixtape, "When The Pain Inflict", released in 2001. Following its positive reception, Roscoe signed to Priority Records and went on to release the album Young Roscoe Philaphornia in 2003. The album peaked at #22 on the Top R&B/Hip-Hop Albums chart.

On October 17, 2013, Roscoe released his mixtape Tha Influence, featuring guest appearances from Xzibit and Kendrick Lamar. The mixtape features production by Best Kept Secret, Bink!, Charlie Red 3000, Fingazz, Hi-Tek, Jahlil Beats, Jake One, Just Blaze, Mike WiLL Made It, Nottz, Statik Selektah and Tone Mason.

On November 11, 2014, Roscoe released his third studio album titled Scoe, Tha Influence Album. This was the first project to be released under his new label, 3D Shadez Entertainment. The album features Too Short, Kurupt, Kobe, Clyde Carson, Xzibit, KJ Konteh, Yummy Bingham, E-Note, and K Young. On the album, Roscoe took a more musical approach by using live musicians rather than producers.

== Discography ==
=== Albums ===
- 2003: Young Roscoe Philaphornia (#148 200, #22 R&B/Hip-Hop)
- 2006: I Luv Cali
- 2008: Stray Dogg - Off Tha Leash, Off Tha Chain
- 2014: Tha Influence Album

=== Collaboration albums ===
- 2008: Armz Up (with Bulletz & AK)
- 2009: Kurupt & Roscoe - Tha Tekneek Filez (with Kurupt)
- 2009: The Frank & Jess Story (with Kurupt) (#82 R&B/Hip-Hop)

=== Mixtapes ===
- 2001: When the Pain Inflict
- 2009: Philaphornia Pt. 2 Tha Philly Fanatic
- 2013: Tha Influence
- 2013: Tha influence (East Coast Edition), hosted by DJ Whoo-Kid
- 2013: Tha Influence 2: X-mas Treez

=== Singles ===
- 2000: "I Love Cali" (#90 R&B/Hip-Hop)
- 2002: "Get Ready" featuring Kokane
- 2002: "Head 2 Toe" featuring Sleepy Brown
- 2003: "Smooth Sailin'" (#73 R&B/Hip-Hop)
- 2006: "Summertime Again" featuring Fingazz
- 2006: "Fuck Buddy" featuring Fingazz
- 2014: "Break Yo Bed" featuring Clyde Carson, Too $hort, All Star
- 2014: "I Do All Dat" featuring Kurupt

=== Guest appearances ===
Year	Song	Artist(s)	Album
1998	"Can't Let That Slide" (featuring Roscoe )	Kurupt	Kuruption
1999	"Girls All Pause" (featuring Nate Dogg, Roscoe)	Kurupt	Streetz Iz A Mutha
1999	"I Call Shots" (featuring Roscoe)	Kurupt	Streetz Iz A Mutha
2000	"When the Pain Inflict" (featuring Roscoe)	Kurupt	Muggs Presents, Soul Assassinz Vol.2
2001	"Oh Boy" (featuring Roscoe)	Don Cisco	Oh Boy
2001	"Training Day"	Roscoe	Training Day Soundtrack
2001	"Yesterday"	Nate Dogg & Roscoe	PootieTang Soundtrack
2003	"This Goes Out" (featuring Nelly, Roscoe, Lil Jon, Lil Wayne, Cardin)	Murphy Lee	Murphy's Law
2003	"California" remix (featuring 2Pac, Crooked I, E-40, Jayo Felony, Kurupt, Mack 10, Roscoe)	Sly Boogie	
2004	"Stackin'"	Sleepy Brown	Phunk-O-Naut
2004	"Jealousy" (featuring Roscoe)	Kurupt	Against The Grain
2005	"Who Ride Wit Us" (featuring Jayo Felony, Bad Azz, Roscoe)	Kurupt	Kurupt's greatest hits vol 1
2006	"Gun Clappin" (featuring Kurupt, Jayo Felony, Young Roscoe & Rikanatti)	Ca$his	Ca$his of Shady Records
2007	"Start a Problem"	Daz	Gangsta Party
2007	"Comeova2nite"	(həd) p.e.	Insomnia
2010	"I'm Burnt" (featuring Snoop Dogg, Problem, Roscoe)	Kurupt	Streetlights
