= In the Movies =

Compilation album by Ice Cube
- Released: September 4, 2007
- Recorded: 1991–2005
- Genre: West Coast hip hop; gangsta rap; hardcore hip hop
- Length: 1:02:23
- Label: Priority
- Producer: Bud'da; Dr. Dre; Hallway Productionz; Ice Cube; One Eye; Paul Oakenfold; Rick "Dutch" Cousin; Rockwilder; Sam Sneed; Sir Jinx; Steve Osborne
- Compiler: Frank Collura

Ice Cube chronology
Greatest Hits (2001)	In the Movies (2007)	The Essentials (2008)

Professional ratings
Review scores
Source	Rating
AllMusic	4/5 stars
MSN Music	(choice cut)
RapReviews	7/10

In the Movies is the fourth compilation album by American rapper and actor Ice Cube. It was released on September 4, 2007, through Priority Records. The collection is composed of 16 previously released songs from several films and film soundtracks in which Ice Cube have contributed, from his acting debut in the 1991 film Boyz n the Hood to 2005's xXx: State of the Union.

Production was handled by Cube himself, as well as Sir Jinx, Bud'da, One Eye, Dr. Dre, Hallway Productionz, Paul Oakenfold, Rick "Dutch" Cousin, Rockwilder, Sam Sneed and Steve Osborne, with Frank Collura serving as a compilation producer. It features guest appearances from Mack 10, Dr. Dre, Ice-T, K-Dee, Master P, Mr. Short Khop, Ms. Toi and Paul Oakenfold.

The album peaked at number 169 on the Billboard 200, number 34 on the Top R&B/Hip-Hop Albums and number 13 on the Top Rap Albums charts in the United States.

== Track listing ==
No.	Title	Producer(s)	Length
1.	"You Can Do It" (featuring Mack 10 and Ms. Toi)	One Eye	4:19
2.	"We Be Clubbin'"	Rick "Dutch" Cousin	4:46
3.	"Natural Born Killaz" (featuring Dr. Dre)	Dr. Dre; Sam Sneed	4:15
4.	"Anybody Seen the Popo's?!"	Hallway Productionz	3:55
5.	"Friday"	Ice Cube	3:48
6.	"How to Survive in South Central"	Ice Cube; Sir Jinx	3:40
7.	"$100 Dollar Bill Y'All"	Rockwilder	3:39
8.	"You Know I'm a Ho" (featuring Master P)	Bud'da	4:17
9.	"The World Is Mine" (featuring Mack 10 and K-Dee)	Ice Cube	3:09
10.	"Ghetto Vet" (featuring Mack 10 and Mr. Short Khop)	Bud'da	4:38
11.	"Maniac in the Brainiac" (featuring Mack 10)	Ice Cube	4:34
12.	"The Wrong Nigga to Fuck Wit"	Ice Cube; Sir Jinx	2:48
13.	"Roll All Day"	One Eye	2:59
14.	"Higher"	Sir Jinx	4:31
15.	"Trespass" (featuring Ice-T)	Sir Jinx	2:54
16.	"Right Here, Right Now" (featuring Paul Oakenfold)	Paul Oakenfold; Steve Osborne	4:11
Total length:			1:02:23

Notes

- Track 1 is taken from Next Friday (Original Motion Picture Soundtrack)
- Tracks 2 and 8 are taken from The Players Club: Music From and Inspired by the New Line Cinema Motion Picture
- Track 3 is taken from Murder Was the Case (The Soundtrack)
- Track 4 is taken from xXx: State of the Union (Music from the Motion Picture)
- Track 5 is taken from Friday (Original Motion Picture Soundtrack)
- Track 6 is taken from Boyz N the Hood (Music From the Motion Picture)
- Track 7 is taken from Greatest Hits and appeared in 2002 film All About the Benjamins.
- Track 9 is taken from Music From the Original Motion Picture Soundtrack Dangerous Ground
- Track 10 is taken from I Got the Hook-Up!
- Track 11 is taken from Bulworth
- Track 12 is taken from Death Certificate
- Track 13 is taken from Gone in 60 Seconds
- Track 14 is taken from Music From The Motion Picture "Higher Learning"
- Track 15 is taken from Music from the Motion Picture Trespass
- Track 16 is taken from Blade II: The Soundtrack

== Personnel ==
- O'Shea "Ice Cube" Jackson – vocals, producer (tracks: 5, 6, 9, 11, 12)
- Dedrick "Mack 10" Rolison – vocals (tracks: 1, 9–11)
- Toikeon "Ms. Toi" Parham – vocals (track 1)
- Andre "Dr. Dre" Young – vocals & producer (track 3)
- Percy "Master P" Miller – vocals (track 8)
- Darrell "K-Dee" Johnson – vocals (track 9)
- Lionel "Mr. Short Khop" Hunt – vocals (track 10)
- Tracy "Ice-T" Marrow – vocals (track 15)
- Donald "One Eye" Saunders – producer (tracks: 1, 13)
- Rick "Dutch" Cousin – producer (track 2)
- Samuel "Sam Sneed" Anderson – producer (track 3)
- Teak Underdue – producer (track 4)
- Deejan Underdue – producer (track 4)
- Anthony "Sir Jinx" Wheaton – producer (tracks: 6, 12, 14, 15)
- Dana "Rockwilder" Stinson – producer (track 7)
- Stephen "Bud'da" Anderson – producer (tracks: 8, 10)
- Paul Oakenfold – producer & mixing (track 16)
- Steve Osborne – producer & mixing (track 16)
- Mark Chalecki – mastering
- Frank Collura – compilation producer
- Susan Lavoie – art direction
- Will Ragland – design
- Eric Williams – photography
- Tracy Bennett – photography
- Michael Miller – photography
- Soren Baker – liner notes

== Charts ==
Chart (2007)	Peak position
US Billboard 200	169
US Top R&B/Hip-Hop Albums (Billboard)	34
US Top Rap Albums (Billboard)	13
