= Shorty (American rapper) =

American rapper (1967–2019)

- Born: Jerome Washington; September 14, 1967; Indianapolis, Indiana U.S.
- Origin: Los Angeles, California, U.S.
- Died: June 16, 2019 (aged 51) Los Angeles, California, U.S.
- Genre: Hip hop
- Occupations: Rapper, producer, activist
- Years active: 1991-2019
- Labels: Street Knowledge, Bow Tie Entertainment, East West America, Universal Records

Jerome Muhammad (September 14, 1967 – June 16, 2019), born Jerome Washington, better known by his stage name Shorty, was an American rapper, producer, gang intervention activist, and member of Ice Cube's spin-off Gold hip hop group Da Lench Mob.

== Early life ==
Born in Indianapolis, Indiana, Shorty's mother Mabel Washington moved him and his older brother Jeff to Los Angeles CA in 1968. Jerome competed locally as a pop lock dancer with other friends in his neighborhood. The dance team put aside dancing in order to protect their neighborhood from rival groups and formed “Marvin Avenue Gangster Crips” in Los Angeles, CA of which Shorty, an adolescent, was a founding member of the street organization. The organization is named after Marvin Avenue, a street located West of Hauser Blvd, between Venice and Washington Blvd.

== The Lench Mob (Posse) ==
After being convicted and serving three years in Corcoran state prison for robbing a Los Angeles police officer, Shorty was released on parole and returned to his neighborhood of West Los Angeles.

The highly publicized acrimonious departure of Ice Cube from the group N.W.A. required him to recruit protection from threats from his former label. During this time Shorty's childhood friend and future bandmate, J-Dee (Dasean Cooper,) introduced Shorty to Ice Cube. Shorty's street reputation preceded him and Ice Cube hired Shorty the first day they met as a personal bodyguard and part of his existing growing entourage or posse called “The Lench Mob.” At this time The Lench Mob was not a recording group but included members such as Female Rapper Yo-Yo, Producer Dj Chilly Chill, Producer Sir Jinx, Rapper T-Bone, Del the Funky Homosapien, K-Dee, Maulkie and others.

In September 1990, Shorty and The Lench Mob posse clashed with Eazy E's hip hop act Above the Law during the annual New Music Seminar conference at the Times Square's Marriott Marquis hotel. The parties agreed to fight in a bathroom, away from cameras but instead squared off in front of the convention crowd. Shorty threw the first punch at Above the Law's Total K-Oss, and J-Dee took on KMG the Illustrator. Actor LaDell Preston plays Jerome “Shorty” Muhammad in the critically acclaimed 2015 film “Straight outta Compton,” directed by F. Gary Gray where this altercation was dramatized.

== Da Lench Mob (music recording group) ==
While on tour, members of rap group Public Enemy namely Professor Griff exposed Ice Cube, Shorty and The Lench Mob to Black history and social consciousness. In several interviews Shorty attributes his transformation from a life of crime to gang intervention by the teachings of The Honorable Elijah Muhammad while on tour with Public Enemy. In 1991 Shorty joined the Nation of Islam in Los Angeles and changed his last name from Washington to Muhammad and married the same year.

In 1992 Shorty collaborated creatively with longtime friend J-Dee, T-Bone, and Ice Cube to form a recording group bearing the name "Da Lench Mob." The debut album entitled “Guerillas in tha Mist” was certified Gold by the Recording Industry Association of America on December 18, 1992, indicating US sales of over 500,000 units.

After the breakup of the group Shorty appeared solo on multiple projects including Coolio's 2× platinum album Gangsta's Paradise(RIAA) and even released his own compilation album in 2001 entitled “Short Stories”.

== Health problems and death ==
Jerome Shorty Muhammad died on June 19, 2019, in Los Angeles, California of kidney and liver failure due to being a victim of poisoning. He was 51 years old. He is survived by 7 children, two grandchildren, his mother, one older brother and younger sister.

== Legacy ==
Many hip hop celebrities paid homage to Shorty after he died in 2019.

- DJ Premier "R.I.P. JEROME "SHORTY" MUHAMMAD of DA LENCH MOB)"
- Chuck D "While BET Awards is being broadcast A very touching Tribute to Shorty of The Lench Mob aka Bro Jerome Muhammad L I V E on HipHop 4 Justice radio show. Rest In Beats ..HipHop can do better by really acknowledging the contributors better".
- Ice Cube "Steady Mobbin'...RIP Shorty/Free JDee #AMWat30"
- Mack 10
- WC "From teenagers way back when to growing up becoming men. Luv you forever homie. Short Dog (Shorty) from Da Lench Mob. R.I.P."

== Posthumous documentary ==
"Comin' Up Short," directed by Queen Muhammad Ali and Hakeem Khaaliq, with music composed by Masaniai Muhammad Ali, delves into the life of Jerome "Shorty" Muhammad, transitioning from a gang leader to a community protector. Produced by Nation19 and Ice Cube, the film sheds light on Shorty's significant impact on Ice Cube's music and his views on systemic issues facing the Black communities. It's acclaimed for compelling storytelling and cinematography and has been recognized by the British Film Institute (BFI) in London and the Pan African Film Festival. A pivotal moment in the film, at 55:52, shockingly reveals that Shorty's rapidly declining health was due to being poisoned. The documentary is accessible for streaming on Amazon Prime and Freevee

== Discography ==
=== Albums ===
Year	Title	Chart positions		Certifications
Year	Title	Billboard 200	Top R&B/Hip-Hop Albums	Certifications
1992	Guerillas in tha Mist	24	4	RIAA: Gold
1994	Planet of da Apes	81	14	

=== Singles ===
Year	Title	Chart positions		Album
Year	Title	Hot Rap Songs	UK Singles Chart	Album
1992	"Guerillas in tha Mist" (with Ice Cube)	—	—	Guerillas in tha Mist
1993	"Freedom Got an A.K." (with Ice Cube)	7	51	Guerillas in tha Mist
1993	"Ain't Got No Class" (with B-Real)	—	—	Guerillas in tha Mist
1994	"Chocolate City"	—	—	Planet of da Apes
1994	"Goin' Bananas / Cut Throats"	—	—	Planet of da Apes

== Filmography ==
=== Films ===
Year	Film	Functioned as				Role
Year	Film	Director	Producer	Screenwriter	Actor	Role
1991	Boyz n the Hood	No	No	No	Yes	Gang Banger
2000	Tha Eastsidaz	No	No	No	Yes	Prisoner
2001	The Wash	No	No	No	Yes	Thug 1
2011	Rhyme and Punishment	No	No	No	Yes	Gang Member
2015	Straight Outta Compton	No	No	No	No	Depicted
2022	Comin' Up Short	No	Yes	No	Yes	Himself
