= Ass, Gas, or Cash (No One Rides for Free) =

Ass, Gas or Cash (No One Rides for Free)

Studio album by K-Dee
- Released: November 15, 1994
- Recorded: 1993–1994
- Studio: Lench Mob Studios (Los Angeles, California)
- Genre: West Coast hip-hop; gangsta rap; G-funk
- Label: Lench Mob; Navarre
- Producer: Ice Cube (also exec.); Vic C; Madness 4 Real; 88 X Unit; Shaquille; Laylaw; D-Mac

Singles from Ass, Gas or Cash (No One Rides for Free)
- 1. "Thought I Saw a Pussy Cat" Released: August 29, 1994; 2. "Hittin' Corners" Released: 1994; 3. "The Freshest MC in the World" Released: 1994

Professional ratings
Review scores
Source	Rating
AllMusic	2.5/5 stars

Ass, Gas or Cash (No One Rides for Free) is the only solo studio album by the American rapper K-Dee. It was released on November 15, 1994, via Lench Mob Records and distributed by Navarre Corporation. Recording sessions took place at Lench Mob Studios in Los Angeles, California, with producers Ice Cube, Madness 4 Real, Vic C., 88 X Unit, Shaquille, D Mac and Laylaw. It features guest appearances from Bootsy Collins, Morris Day, Ice Cube, Ayana Anderson and Snow. The album peaked at number 33 on the Top R&B/Hip-Hop Albums chart and number 20 on the Heatseekers Albums chart in the United States. It spawned three singles: "Thought I Saw a Pussy Cat", "The Freshest MC in the World" and "Hittin' Corners".

== Track listing ==
No.	Title	Producer(s)	Length
1.	"Intro"	D-Mac; Laylaw	1:24
2.	"The Best Thing Goin'"	Madness 4 Real	5:01
3.	"Hittin' Corners"	Shaquille	4:41
4.	"The Freshest MC in the World" (featuring Ayana Anderson)	Ice Cube	4:52
5.	"Pimpin' and Pandering (Part 1)"		0:49
6.	"Make the Music"	Vic C	4:42
7.	"Gigalos Get Lonely Too" (featuring Morris Day)	Ice Cube	5:26
8.	"Neva Was a Baller"	88 X Unit	4:31
9.	"Where's That Cat?"		0:29
10.	"Thought I Saw a Pussy Cat" (featuring Ice Cube & Bootsy Collins)	Ice Cube	4:28
11.	"K-Swinga"	Vic C; Ice Cube	4:23
12.	"Pimpin' and Pandering (Part 2)"		0:21
13.	"Talk of the Town"	Ice Cube	4:44
14.	"Into You"	Ice Cube	5:05
15.	"Words to the Wise"		0:21
16.	"Ain't Nothin' Poppin'" (featuring Snow)	Madness 4 Real	4:57
17.	"Assoline"		0:12
18.	"Ass, Gas or Cash" (featuring Bootsy Collins & Ice Cube)	Ice Cube	5:01

Sample credits

- Track 1 contains an interpolation of "War of the Hearts" written by Helen Folasade Adu and Stuart Matthewman
- Track 4 contains an interpolation of "Free" written by Deniece Williams, Hank Redd, Nathan Watts and Susaye Greene
- Track 7 contains an interpolation of "Gigolos Get Lonely Too" written by Morris Day
- Track 8 contains an interpolation of "Why Can't We Be Friends?" written by Thomas Sylvester Allen, Harold Ray Brown, Morris Dickerson, Lonnie Jordan, Charles Miller, Lee Oskar, Howard E. Scott and Jerry Goldstein
- Track 11 contains an interpolation of "U Send Me Swingin'" written by Larry Waddell, Jeffrey Allen, Ricky Kinchen, Keri Lewis, Homer O'Dell and Stokley Williams
- Track 14 contains an interpolation of "Into You" written by George Clinton

== Personnel ==
- Darrell L. Johnson – rap vocals
- O'Shea Jackson – vocals (tracks: 10, 18), producer (tracks: 4, 7, 10, 11, 13, 14, 18), mixing, executive producer
- William Earl Collins – vocals (tracks: 10, 18), bass (tracks: 10, 14)
- Ayana Anderson – vocals (track 4)
- Morris E. Day – vocals (track 7)
- Snow – vocals (track 16)
- Natasha Walker – backing vocals (tracks: 2, 13, 14)
- Darryl "D' Style" White – backing vocals (tracks: 3, 6, 14)
- Nicole Chaney – backing vocals (tracks: 2, 13)
- Cisco – backing vocals (tracks: 4, 13)
- Nanci Fletcher – backing vocals (tracks: 10, 14)
- The Unda Covers – backing vocals (track 2)
- Alysse Manning – backing vocals (track 10)
- Ferry Freeman – backing vocals (track 10)
- Dap – backing vocals (track 16)
- Emmanual Dean – keyboards (tracks: 3, 14)
- Clint Stokes III – keyboards (tracks: 4, 7, 13)
- George Bernard Worrell Jr. – keyboards (track 10)
- Mark Cross – keyboards (track 13)
- Warryn Cambell – additional keyboards (track 16)
- James "Tre" Rabb – guitar (tracks: 4, 7, 13)
- Dirty Mug – guitar (tracks: 10, 14)
- Clint Sands – bass (tracks: 4, 7, 13)
- Derrick McDowell – producer (track 1)
- Larry Goodman – producer (track 1)
- Lasse Bavngaard – producer (tracks: 2, 16)
- Nicholas Kvaran – producer (tracks: 2, 16)
- Rasmus Berg – producer (tracks: 2, 16)
- Jesper Dahl – producer (tracks: 2, 16)
- Shaquil Tajh Allah – producer (track 3)
- Victor "Vic C" Conception – producer (tracks: 6, 11)
- Michael Keith Simmons – producer (track 8)
- Victor Nathan Taylor – producer (track 8)
- Chris Puram – mixing
- Keston E. Wright – mixing

== Chart history ==
Chart (1995)	Peak position
US Top R&B/Hip-Hop Albums (Billboard)	33
US Heatseekers Albums (Billboard)	20
