= Splackavellie =

Single by Pressha

from the album Don't Get It Twisted and The Players Club soundtrack
- Released: 1998
- Recorded: 1997
- Genre: R&B
- Label: LaFace
- Songwriter(s): Pressha
- Producer(s): Joseph "Adonis" Carn, Baron "B-Rock" Agee

Pressha singles chronology
"Get It Ready, Here It Comes (Choo Choo)" (1995)	"Splackavellie" (1998)

"Splackavellie" is an R&B song by American singer Pressha, released as the first single from his debut album Don't Get It Twisted and from the soundtrack to the 1998 film The Players Club, peaking at #27 on the Billboard Hot 100 and #14 on the Billboard R&B/Hip-Hop Singles chart.

== Charts ==
=== Weekly charts ===
Chart (1998)	Peak position
US Billboard Hot 100	27
US Hot R&B/Hip-Hop Songs (Billboard)	14

=== Year-end charts ===
Chart (1998)	Position
US Hot R&B/Hip-Hop Songs (Billboard)	94
