= Da Lench Mob =

American rap trio from California

Background information
- Origin: Los Angeles, California, U.S.
- Genres: Political hip-hop; gangsta rap
- Years active: 1990–1995
- Labels: Street Knowledge; East West; Priority; Atco
- Past members: J-Dee; Shorty; Maulkie; T-Bone

Da Lench Mob was an American hip-hop group from Los Angeles, California, active from 1990 to 1995. The group originally consisted of numerous individuals associated with rapper Ice Cube, but the initial recording lineup settled with rappers Shorty, T-Bone, and J-Dee. The group's debut album, Guerillas in tha Mist, was certified gold by the RIAA while the album's second single, "Freedom Got an A.K.", was a top-ten hit on the Hot Rap Songs chart. After J-Dee was incarcerated for a 1993 murder, he was replaced by Maulkie. Da Lench Mob released their second album in 1994, Planet of da Apes. The group disbanded in 1995.

== History ==
The group made their debut on Ice Cube's first solo album, AmeriKKKa's Most Wanted. At that time, the name referred to all of the performers on the album (including Ice Cube), rather than the distinct group it would become. At first the name was also spelled "The" rather than "Da" on the album sleeve. The members specifically named in the album's liner notes included Ice Cube, Sir Jinx, T-Bone, Yo-Yo, Chill, J-Dee, Del the Funky Homosapien, and K-Dee.

Da Lench Mob finalized the recording lineup with Shorty, T-Bone, and J-Dee as the members, and they signed with the major label EastWest Records. With Ice Cube as executive producer, Da Lench Mob released their debut album, Guerillas in tha Mist, in 1992. B-Real of Cypress Hill and Ice Cube contributed vocals to the album. Guerillas in tha Mist notably peaked at No. 24 on the Billboard 200 chart. It was eventually certified gold by the RIAA. The single "Freedom Got an A.K." peaked at No. 7 on the Hot Rap Songs chart. The group also found success overseas, as "Freedom Got an A.K." appeared on the UK Singles chart. The video for the album's lead single, also titled "Guerillas in tha Mist", became popular in the fall of 1992. Da Lench Mob toured as Ice Cube's openers throughout 1992, which also included an appearance at that year's Lollapalooza festival. Towards the end of 1992, Da Lench Mob toured alongside Beastie Boys and Rollins Band in the US.

Da Lench Mob contributed the song "Guerillas Ain't Gangstas" to the soundtrack of the film Menace II Society in early 1993. The soundtrack was a success as it peaked at No. 11 on the Billboard 200 chart and was certified platinum by the RIAA. Da Lench Mob toured Europe during the summer of 1993, with their final show in Germany. After they returned home, J-Dee was involved in a fight at a club that led to the death of a 22-year-old man, and thus J-Dee was arrested and charged with murder. J-Dee claimed his innocence, although he admitted responsibility as an auxiliary accomplice. Instead of disbanding, the group brought in South Central Los Angeles-based rapper Maulkie (former member of the Ruthless Records group Yomo & Maulkie) for their second album Planet of da Apes, released in 1994. The album featured a variety of musicians, such as Ice Cube, Bootsy Collins, Quincy Jones III, K-Dee, among others. Although Planet of da Apes peaked at No. 81 on the Billboard 200 chart, it did not replicate the success of Guerillas in tha Mist. The following year, Da Lench Mob's "The World Is a Ghetto" appeared on the soundtrack to the film Panther. The soundtrack was certified gold by the RIAA and peaked at No. 37 on the Billboard 200 chart. Da Lench Mob broke up the following year due to a dispute over money and other differences. Also in 1995, J-Dee was sentenced to 29 years in prison for the 1993 murder, less three years for time served.

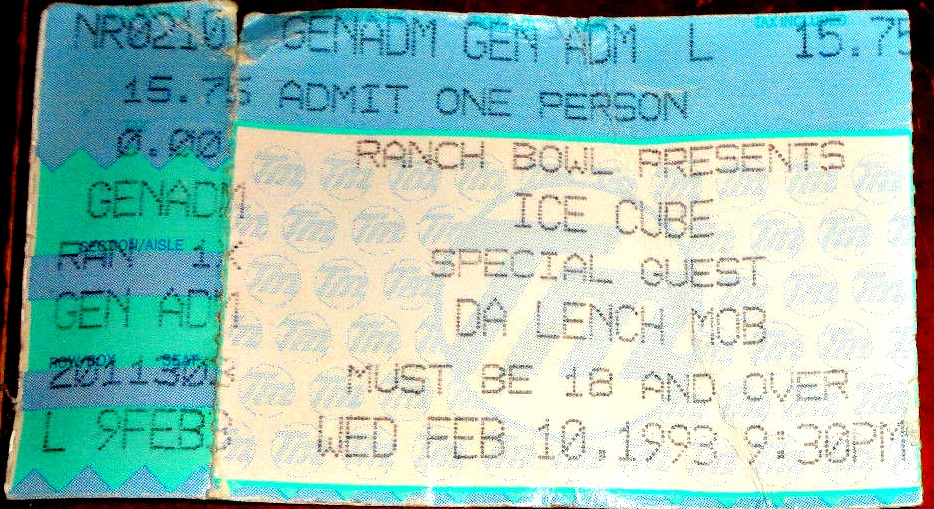
A ticket from a 1993 Lench Mob concert in Omaha, Nebraska.

The 2004 video game Grand Theft Auto: San Andreas featured "Guerillas in tha Mist", appearing on the fictional radio station Radio Los Santos. Shorty released a compilation album entitled Short Stories in 2001. He eventually died on June 16, 2019 at the age of 51. Throughout the 1990s and 2000s, T-Bone appeared sporadically with other artists, albeit in the studio as a featured guest or producer. J-Dee was released on parole in 2021, after serving 25 years. He started releasing new music thereafter under the name J-Dee Lench Mob. His debut album, Cali Connected, was released in January 2023. In 2024, J-Dee reunited with Ice Cube on the track "Facts", which appeared on Ice Cube's album Man Down.

== Discography ==
=== Albums ===
Year	Title	Chart positions		Certifications
Year	Title	Billboard 200	Top R&B/Hip-Hop Albums	Certifications
1992	Guerillas in tha Mist	24	4	RIAA: Gold
1994	Planet of da Apes	81	14	

=== Singles ===
Year	Title	Chart positions		Album
Year	Title	Hot Rap Songs	UK Singles Chart	Album
1992	"Guerillas in tha Mist"	—	—	Guerillas in tha Mist
1993	"Freedom Got an A.K."	7	51	Guerillas in tha Mist
1993	"Ain't Got No Class" (feat. B-Real)	—	—	Guerillas in tha Mist
1994	"Chocolate City"	—	—	Planet of da Apes
1994	"Goin' Bananas"	—	—	Planet of da Apes
