= Bud'da =

American music producer

- Born: Stephen Anderson; Pittsburgh, Pennsylvania, U.S.
- Genres: Hip hop
- Occupations: Record producer; songwriter; composer; rapper
- Instruments: Turntables; electronics; vocals
- Years active: 1995–present
- Labels: Aftermath
- Website: http://buddamusiconline.com/

Stephen Anderson, better known as Bud'da, is an American producer, songwriter, composer and rapper for artists such as Ice Cube, Dr. Dre, Xzibit, Tank and Aaliyah. Through the successful Westside Connection stint, and the mutual acquaintance of fellow Pittsburgh producer Sam Sneed, Dr. Dre wanted to feature snippets of a Bud’da-produced track in the beginning and end of the 2pac & Dr. Dre video for “California Love,” off Tupac Shakur’s All Eyez on Me. Soon after Dr. Dre’s historic departure from Death Row Records, Bud’da was once again recruited by Dr. Dre to co-produce the lead single "Been There, Done That" off the Dr. Dre Presents the Aftermath album.

== Early life ==
Bud'da was born and raised in Pittsburgh, Pennsylvania, and began his career with production for Da Lench Mob Records' group Kausion. He went on to work with a wide range of artists including Xzibit, Nas, Timbaland, Shanice, Lenny Kravitz, Tank, Dawn Robinson of En Vogue, King T, Dr. Dre, Aaliyah, and Ice Cube. It was with Ice Cube that Bud'da came into more prominence. Producing five tracks on the Ice Cube-led Westside Connection album “Bow Down”, along with WC and Mack 10, including the title track “Bow Down”.

== Career ==
Bud'da started briefly with Death Row Records, then in 1996 he joined Aftermath records to work with Dr. Dre and others. Bud'da met Dre while playing different beats including "California Love". As Bud'da mentioned in a HipHopDX interview, "that was my introduction into working with him. A couple of months started passing, and once he was gonna make that transition [away from Death Row Records] he asked if I wanted to be down with the transition." His musical style was influenced by "California Love", "Been There, Done That", and the East Coast–West Coast rivalry. Eventually, Dr. Dre signed Bud'da as a producer and as an artist. Dr Dre Presents...The Aftermath was released on November 26, 1996. In spite of Dr. Dre's name being on the album, and it being certified platinum, it received mixed reviews and was not amongst the year's more commercially successful releases.

At the end of his tenure with Aftermath, Bud'da reminisced about Dre: "I learned everything that I know from him. I think that those years that I was at Aftermath if anything, to me, I consider it like I went to college. ‘Cause the knowledge I got during that time, it’s priceless."

=== Aaliyah ===
Bud’da was introduced into Blackground Records in 1999, which acquired artists such as Aaliyah, Tank, and Timbaland. One of the first projects Bud’da worked on was Aaliyah’s third and final studio album: Aaliyah. The approach of the project was to expand the boundaries of R and B. Aaliyah was wanted to go in a new direction, and Bud’da provided that new sound. As project was breaking new ground Bud’da said in an interview

“But if you create your own sound, your own path then you’re going to be a trendsetter and people are going to do what you want to do and then you’re going to be able to change and make some kind of a movement versus just doing something that everybody else is doing. Aaliyah didn’t want to do that and nobody involved with the project wanted to do that.”

With the darkness of Rock, the undertones of UK Garage, hard hitting drums of Hip-hop, and the live percussions of latin music, Bud’da mark on the “Aaliyah” project where felt. On songs such as “Never No More” and “I Can Be” was his presence was felt most along with Tank as well as other songs (See Discography). Aaliyah was released in July 2001. In the United States, it debuted at number two on the Billboard 200 albums chart, selling 187,000 copies in the week of August 4. She eventually sold 2,600,000 million albums and 13 million world wide. Additionally, Aaliyah was met with highly positive reviews from most critics. Unfortunately, On August 25, 2001, Aaliyah and the members of the record company, died in a plane crash after “filming rock the boat” music video.

== Discography ==
=== Production ===
Year	Artist	Release	Tracks Produced	Additional Notes
1995	Kausion	South Central Los Skanless	"Land Of The Skanless", "Supersperm"	
1996	Dr. Dre	The Aftermath	"Been There, Done That", "Got Me Open", "Str-8 Gone", "Do 4 Love", "Sexy Dance", "Nationowl"	Dr. Dre
1996	Westside Connection	Bow Down	"Bow Down", "Do You Like Criminals?", "The Gangsta, the Killa and the Dope Dealer", "Cross 'Em Out and Put a 'K", "3 Time Felons"	K-Dee
1997	D'Meka	Coast To Coast/Gotta Get My Groove On LP	"Coast To Coast"	
1998	Xzibit	40 Dayz & 40 Nightz	"3 Card Molly", "Deeper"	
1998	Onyx	Shut 'Em Down	"React", "Ghetto Starz"	
1998	Ice Cube	War & Peace Vol. 1 (The War Disc)	"War & Peace", "Ghetto Vet", "Extradition"	Ice Cube
	Various Artist	The Players Club (soundtrack)	"You Know I'm a Ho", "Dreamin'"	
1999	Snoop Dogg	No Limit Top Dogg	"Trust Me"	
2000	Ice Cube	War & Peace Vol. 2 (The Peace Disc)	"Record Company Pimpin'"	
2001	Tank	Force of Nature	"Throw Your Hands Up", "What What What", "Let It Go", "I Don't Wanna Be Lovin' You" and "Maybe I Deserve (Remix)"	
2001	Aaliyah	Aaliyah	"Never No More", "Read Between The Lines", "I Can Be"	
2001	Nas	Exit Wounds Soundtrack	"Gangsta Tears"	
2002	Knoc-turn'al	L.A. Confidential Presents: Knoc-turn'al	"Cash Sniffin' Noses"	
2002	King T	The Kingdom Come	"Stay Down", "Shake Da Spot", "Nuthin Has Changed"	
2006	Ice Cube	Laugh Now, Cry Later	"Smoke Some Weed" and "Chrome & Paint"	
2006	Shanice	Every Woman Dreams	"Things In The Movies"	
2022	AZ	"Stay Fly"	Doe or Die II (Deluxe)	Producer
2023	Alexander James Rodriguez		"Euphoria"	Song Writer

=== Remixes ===
- "Georgy Porgy (The Bud'da Sauce Remix)" on the single "Georgy Porgy" (1999) by Eric Benét
- "How Long" on the album Dawn(2002) by Dawn Robinson
- "Got To Give It Up (Remix)" on the album I Care 4 U (2002) by Aaliyah
- "Those Were The Days (Bud'da Remix)" (2001) by Aaliyah - unreleased

=== Film and television composing ===
Television
Year	Title	Network	Additional Notes
2004	Da Boom Crew	Kids' WB	Additional music
2005	Miracle's Boys	The N (Teen Nick)	
2005	The Proud Family	Disney Channel	
2006	That's What I'm Talking About	TV Land	Composed the first episode
2007	As the Bell Rings	Disney Channel	List of composed episodes—Slacker Girl (2007) - Ladder, Dudes! (2007) - Bad Boys (2007) - To Go or Not to Go (2007) - The Dance (2007) - Talent Show (2007) - Flower Day (2007)
2008	Studio DC: Almost Live!	Disney Channel	
2019	Raven's Home	Disney Channel	
2022	Mecha Builders	Cartoon Network	Composed the Theme Song

Film
Year	Title	Director	Studio	Additional Notes
1996	Been there, Done that (short)	Kia B. Puriefoy	Music Television (MTV)	
2007	Walk by Faith	Jill Maxcy	Grubb Productions Nu-Lite Entertainment	
2008	Color of the Cross 2: The Resurrection	Jean-Claude La Marre	Nu-Lite Entertainment Blackwood Films (co-production)	
2008	Say You Say Me (Short)	DeForest Mapp	Brownstone Entertainment (I) SunFace Entertainment	
2009	See Dick Run	Dwayne Alexander Smith	Damn Good Idea Productions	
2010	Trapped: Haitian Nights	Jean-Claude La Marre	Haitian Nights Productions Nu-Lite Entertainment	
2011	The Lying Truth	Reggie Gaskins	One II Grow On Films Inc.	
2011	Dance Fu	Cedric the Entertainer	Bird and a Bear Entertainment	
2019	Substance (Short)	Jamaal Bradley	PopWilly Productions	
