= South Central Los Skanless =

Studio album by Kausion
- Released: October 10, 1995
- Recorded: 1995
- Studio: Lench Mob Studios (Los Angeles, CA)
- Genre: West Coast hip-hop; gangsta rap; G-funk
- Length: 49:36
- Label: Lench Mob; Navarre
- Producer: Ice Cube (also exec.); Kausion; Bud'da; Eric "Da Myth'" Murray; Laylaw; D'Maq

Singles from South Central Los Skanless
- 1. "What You Wanna Do?" Released: July 1995; 2. "Land of the Skanless" Released: 1995; 3. "O/G's Trippin'" Released: December 13, 1995

South Central Los Skanless is the only album by American rap group Kausion. It was released October 10, 1995 through Lench Mob Records and distributed by Navarre Corporation. The album peaked at number 37 on the US Billboard Top R&B/Hip-Hop Albums and at number 23 on the Heatseekers Albums charts.

Audio production was mainly handled by the group themselves and Ice Cube, with DJ Crazy Toones providing scratches for the album. Its lead single, "What You Wanna Do?", was later featured on the fictional radio station West Coast Classics in the video game Grand Theft Auto V.

== Singles ==
The single, "What You Wanna Do?", was released in July 1995.

== Track listing ==
No.	Title	Producer(s)	Length
1.	"Grand Theft Auto" (Intro)		0:57
2.	"What You Wanna Do?"	Ice Cube	4:08
3.	"O/G's Trippin'"	Ice Cube	3:31
4.	"Land Of The Skanless"	Bud'da	3:34
5.	"Dicktate" (Insert)		0:33
6.	"Sewed Up"	Ice Cube	4:42
7.	"The Deea" (Insert)		0:56
8.	"Supersperm" (featuring K-Dee)	Bud'da	4:02
9.	"Bounce, Rock, Skate"	Kausion	3:22
10.	"Cellies" (Insert)		0:34
11.	"Steal At Will"	Ice Cube	3:38
12.	"16 Times"	D-Maq; Laylaw	2:21
13.	"Fat Bitches" (Insert)		0:32
14.	"Click, Click"	Eric "Da Myth'" Murray; Kausion	3:06
15.	"Murdering, Slanging & Scrapin'"	Ice Cube	5:19
16.	"If It's Alright"	Ice Cube; Kausion	4:20
17.	"What That South Central Like" (featuring B-Real)	Kausion	3:58
Total length:			49:36

Sample credits

- "Grand Theft Auto" contains elements from "Black Female Prostitute Flirts From The Sidewalk" by The Hollywood Edge Sound Effects Library (1990)
- "What You Wanna Do?" contains elements from "Aqua Boogie (A Psychoalphadiscobetabioaquadoloop)" by Parliament (1978) and "Theme From the Black Hole" by Parliament (1979)
- "O/G's Trippin'" contains elements from "You're a Customer" by EPMD (1988) and "(Not Just) Knee Deep" by Funkadelic (1979)
- "Land Of The Skanless" contains elements from "Brother's Gonna Work It Out" by Willie Hutch (1973)
- "Sewed Up" contains elements from "Theme From the Black Hole" by Parliament (1979) and "Criminal Minded" by Boogie Down Productions (1987)
- "Supersperm" contains elements from "Super Sporm" by Captain Sky (1978) and "If You Think You're Lonely Now" by Bobby Womack (1981)
- "Bounce, Rock, Skate" contains elements from "Gimme The Loot" by Notorious B.I.G. (1994)
- "Steal at Will" contains elements from "Until You Come Back To Me (That's What I'm Gonna Do)" by Aretha Franklin (1973) and "Robbin' Hood (Cause It Ain't All Good)" by Ice Cube (1994)
- "16 Times" contains elements from "I Can Make You Dance" by Zapp (1983)
- "If It's Alright" contains elements from "Dusic" by Brick (1977)
- "What That South Central Like" contains elements from "Mothership Connection (Star Child)" by Parliament (1975)

== Personnel ==
- Kausion – lead vocals, producers (tracks 9, 14, 16–17)
- Darrell L. Johnson – vocals (track 8)
- Nanci Fletcher – vocals (tracks 2, 8)
- Natasha Walker – vocals (tracks 2, 8)
- Louis Freese – backing vocals (track 17)
- James "Tre" Rabb – keyboards (tracks 2, 14, 17)
- Stu Marvels – keyboards (tracks 4, 8)
- Lamar Dupré Calhoun – scratches (tracks 2, 9, 11, 14)
- O'Shea Jackson – executive producer, mixing, producer (tracks 2–3, 6, 11, 15–16)
- Stephen Anderson – producer (tracks 4, 8)
- Derrick McDowell – producer (track 12)
- Larry Goodman – producer (track 12)
- Keston E. Wright – mixing

== Charts ==
Chart (1995)	Peak position
US Top R&B/Hip-Hop Albums (Billboard)	37
US Heatseekers Albums (Billboard)	23
