= It's My Ego =

Song by Ice Cube

from the album Man Down
- Genre: Gangsta rap
- Label: Lench Mob Records and Hitmaker Distro
- Songwriters: E-A-Ski & Ice Cube
- Producer: E-A-Ski

Ice Cube singles chronology
"Trying to Maintain" (2021)	"It's My Ego" (2024)	"Ego Maniacs" (2024)

"It's My Ego" is the 46th single released by American rapper Ice Cube on October 18, 2024, by Lench Mob Records and Hitmaker Distro. It is part of the Man Down album and was released with the album on November 22, 2024. It also appears as a remix on Man Up. The production was handled by E-A-Ski and the song was written by Ice Cube and E-A-Ski. The track was accompanied by a music video.

== Music video ==
The music video is directed by Gabriel Hart and was also produced by Gabriel Hart while the executive producer was Ice Cube. The video begins in a church with people standing and clapping as Ice Cube is sitting down with his hands together.

== Critical reception ==
The song charted 17 days after its release and went to number 7 on Billboard's top-selling rap-only cuts. It reached number one on the Rap Digital Song Sales chart.
