= Rap Sheet =

Studio album by DMX
- Released: 2002
- Recorded: 2001–2002
- Genre: Hardcore hip hop

DMX chronology
The Great Depression (2001)	Rap Sheet (2002)	The DMX Files (2002)

Singles from Rap Sheet
- 1. "Shut 'em Down" Released: April 17, 1998; 2. "Come Back In One Piece" Released: December 11, 2001; 3. "Whatcha Gonna Do?" Released: August 25, 1998; 4. "We Be Clubbin' (Remix)" Released: 1998; 5. "Grand Finale" Released: October 27, 1998

Professional ratings
Review scores
Source	Rating
Allmusic	4/5 stars
The Daily Vault	B
Entertainment Weekly	B+
Robert Christgau	(dud)
Rolling Stone	3/5 stars
The Source	(favorable)
USA Today	3/4 stars

Rap Sheet is an album by rapper DMX released in 2002.

== Track listing ==
1. "Born Loser (Original)"
2. "No Problems" (featuring Mysonne, Billy Ray)
3. "Three Stories" (featuring Duo)
4. "Make A Move (Original)"
5. "Get It Right" (featuring Drag-On)
6. "Shut 'em Down" (featuring Onyx)
7. "More Money, More Cash, More Hoes" (featuring Jay-Z, Memphis Bleek, Beanie Sigel)
8. "Come Back In One Piece" (featuring Aaliyah)
9. "Grand Finale (Remix)" (featuring Method Man, Vita, Nas, Ja Rule)
10. "Tales From The Darkside"
11. "Can't Touch Me Kid"
12. "Yeah Yeah" (featuring Drag-On)
13. "Make A Move (Remix)"
14. "Scenario 2000" (featuring Eve, The LOX, Drag-On)
15. "Whatcha Gonna Do?" (featuring Jayo Felony, Method Man)
16. "We Be Clubbin' (Remix)" (featuring Ice Cube)
17. "Born Loser (Remix)"
