= Man Up (Ice Cube album) =

Studio album by Ice Cube
- Released: September 12, 2025
- Recorded: 2025
- Genre: Gangsta rap
- Length: 41:28
- Labels: Lench Mob & Hitmaker
- Producers: E-A-Ski; DecadeZ; Prohoezak; HallWay Productionz; The Mekanix; Dj Montay; Fury; Erick Sermon

Ice Cube chronology
Man Down (2024)	Man Up (2025)

Singles from Man Up
- 1. "Before Hip-Hop" Released: September 5th, 2025

Man Up is the twelfth studio album by American rapper Ice Cube. It was released on September 12, 2025, by Lench Mob Records & Hitmaker. The Album features guest appearances from Scarface & Quake Matthews while production was handled by E-A-Ski, DecadeZ, Prohoezak, HallWay Productionz, The Mekanix, Dj Montay, Fury and Erick Sermon. Man Up released one single called "Before Hip-Hop".

== Background and cover ==
Man Up is the follow up to Ice Cube's 11th album Man Down, released a year before. Ice Cube stated "After Man Down, you got to Man Up. I've been watching the climate of the culture lately, and I see a lot of overly sensitive people out there. I felt like it was time to share some street knowledge about what it really means to stand up and man up, in a way that speaks to responsibility, resilience, and truth. This project is the right message for the times we're living in because everybody's being tested. And when life tests you, you either fold up or you Man Up." While also saying "I've always stood on speaking truth to power and making music that reflects reality. Man Up is about accountability, resilience, and reminding people where the real problems come from. Hip hop didn't create the struggle — it gave us the language to call it out."

The album's covers shows Ice Cube as a giant laying down with people holding him down with ropes as he expresses an angry expression while trying to sit up.

== Promotion and release ==
"Before Hip-Hop" was released as the lead single of the album accompanied by a music video. "Act My Age" was also accompanied by a video which was released with the album.

Ice Cube announced the album's release a week before it officially released. Alongside the album during the announcement, he also stated there is going to be a tour called "Truth to Power: 4 Decades of Attitude" celebrating 40 years of groundbreaking music.

== Singles and remixes ==
The track "It's My Ego 3Mix" is a remix of the track "It's My Ego" which features Scarface & Quake Matthews. It is the only track on the album that features an artist but doesn't have a music video. "Before Hip-Hop" Is the Lead Single of the album and it was released a week before the album on September the 5th 2025. "Act My Age" is another track which featured Scarface and was released with a music video.

== Critical reception ==
Professional ratings
Review scores
Source	Rating
AllMusic	4/5 stars

AllMusic's review described "the first nine tracks are gangsta rap that will blow your mind, then three Golden Age tracks just as strong, then there's a somewhat slower track, and the final song is smashing again."

== Track listing ==
All tracks are written by O'Shea Jackson.

No.	Title	Length
1.	"Man Power"	3:17
2.	"What You Gonna Do About It?"	2:25
3.	"Freedumb"	2:23
4.	"Guess What?"	3:40
5.	"Forget Me If You Ain't Wit Me"	3:41
6.	"Before Hip-Hop"	3:50
7.	"Act My Age"	2:45
8.	"Ratchet Ass Mouth"	2:23
9.	"Respect My Space"	2:27
10.	"California Dreamin"	2:32
11.	"That Salt and Pepper"	1:51
12.	"Bring Everybody"	3:28
13.	"It's My Ego 3Mix"	3:46
14.	"All Work and No Play"	3:05
Total length:		41:28
