= K-Dee =

American rapper

- Also known as: Kid Disaster
- Born: May 24, 1969 (age 56)
- Origin: Los Angeles, California, U.S.
- Genres: West Coast hip-hop; gangsta rap
- Occupations: Rapper; songwriter
- Years active: 1986–present
- Label: Lench Mob
- Formerly of: C.I.A.

Darrell L. Johnson, also known as K-Dee, formerly Kid Disaster (born May 24, 1969), is an American rapper most known for his album Ass, Gas, or Cash (No One Rides for Free).

He first gained recognition in the Los Angeles hip-hop scene as a member of C.I.A., alongside fellow West Coast rapper Ice Cube. After the group disbanded, he became affiliated with Da Lench Mob, Cube’s collective and label, where he continued collaborating with artists from the Lench Mob circle. His appearances throughout the 1990s helped establish him as a recognizable figure in West Coast hip-hop.

== Discography ==
=== Studio albums ===
Title	Album details	Peak chart positions		
Title	Album details	US	US R&B	US Rap
Ass, Gas, or Cash (No One Rides for Free)	Released: November 15, 1994; Label: Lench Mob, Navarre; Format: CD, LP, cassette	—	33	—

=== Guest appearances ===
Title	Year	Artist(s)	Album
"Make It Ruff, Make It Smooth"	1993	Ice Cube (feat. K-Dee)	Lethal Injection
"Mellow Madness"	1994	Da Lench Mob (feat. K-Dee)	Planet of da Apes
"H.O.E.K."	1995	Mack 10 (feat. K-Dee)	Mack 10
"Supersperm"	1995	Kausion (feat. K-Dee)	South Central Los Skanless
"Aint No Bustas This Way"	1996	Dazzie Dee (feat. Ice Cube and K-Dee)	Re-Birth
"Do You Like Criminals?"	1996	Westside Connection (feat. K-Dee)	Bow Down
"Hoo-Bangin' (WSCG Style)"	1996	Westside Connection (feat. The Comrads, Allfrumtha I and K-Dee)	Bow Down
"The World Is Mine"	1997	Ice Cube, Mack 10 and K-Dee	Dangerous Ground (soundtrack)
"Fa-Show"	1997	K-Dee	Dangerous Ground (soundtrack)
"Make Money"	1997	Ant Banks (feat. CJ Mac and K-Dee)	Big Thangs
"World Wide"	1997	K-Dee	The Lawhouse Experience, Volume One
"One Day at a Time"	1998	Devin the Dude (feat. K-Dee and K.B.)	The Dude
"Can't Change Me"	1998	Devin the Dude (feat. K-Dee and K.B.)	The Dude
