= Guerillas in tha Mist =

Studio album by Da Lench Mob
- Released: September 22, 1992
- Recorded: June 1991 – April 1992
- Studio: Echo Sound (Los Angeles, California)
- Genre: Gangsta rap
- Length: 41:24
- Labels: Street Knowledge; East West; Atco
- Producer: Ice Cube (also exec.)

Da Lench Mob chronology
Guerillas in tha Mist (1992)	Planet of da Apes (1994)

Singles from Guerillas in tha Mist
- 1. "Guerillas in tha Mist" Released: August 19, 1992; 2. "Freedom Got an A.K." Released: November 14, 1992

Guerillas in tha Mist is the debut studio album by American hip-hop group Da Lench Mob, It was released on September 22, 1992, by Street Knowledge Records, East West Records and Atco Records, who originally appeared on Ice Cube's debut solo album, AmeriKKKa's Most Wanted. The titular "Guerillas in tha Mist" was a hit at the release of the album. The album was produced by Ice Cube, who is also featured throughout the album though uncredited. The album peaked at number 24 on the Billboard 200, number 4 on the Top R&B/Hip-Hop Albums, and was certified Gold by the Recording Industry Association of America on December 18, 1992, indicating US sales of over 500,000 units. The single "Freedom Got an A.K." peaked at number 7 on the Hot Rap Songs.

The album title is a pun on the popular movie title Gorillas in the Mist and guerrilla warfare. In the post-Los Angeles riot atmosphere of the album's release, the title was also perceived as a clever reference to a comment made by one of the police officers who had arrested Rodney King. Laurence Michael Powell, one of King's arresting officers, had described through radio message a domestic disturbance involving two black people as something straight from Gorillas in the Mist. Powell's comment was considered highly racist, comparing black people to gorillas, and was used against the officer during the Rodney King trial.

== Commercial performance ==
The album was certified gold on December 18, 1992, selling over 500,000 copies.

== Critical reception ==
Professional ratings
Review scores
Source	Rating
AllMusic	4.5/5 stars
Los Angeles Times	3.5/4 stars
RapReviews	8/10
The Source	4/5 stars

The Los Angeles Times praised the "snarling raps, sharp humor, canny observations and fast, funky beats."

== Track listing ==
No.	Title	Length
1.	"Capital Punishment in America"	1:55
2.	"Buck the Devil"	4:28
3.	"Lost in tha System"	3:34
4.	"You and Your Heroes"	2:59
5.	"All on My Nut Sack"	4:33
6.	"Guerillas in tha Mist"	4:25
7.	"Lenchmob Also in the Group"	1:47
8.	"Ain't Got No Class" (featuring B-Real)	3:35
9.	"Freedom Got an A.K."	3:03
10.	"Ankle Blues"	2:47
11.	"Who Ya Gonna Shoot wit That"	2:43
12.	"Lord Have Mercy"	3:40
13.	"Inside the Head of a Black Man"	1:55
Total length:		41:24

Notes

- Tracks 2, 4, 5, 6 and 9 featured uncredited vocals by Ice Cube.

== Personnel ==
- Terry "T-Bone" Gray – vocals, co-producer
- Jerome "Shorty" Muhammad – vocals
- DaSean "J-Dee" Cooper – vocals
- O'Shea Jackson – vocals (tracks: 2, 4–6, 9), producer, executive producer
- Louis Freese – vocals (track 8)
- Derrick A. Baker – co-producer
- James Rashad Coes – co-producer
- Mister Woody – co-producer
- Bob Morris – engineering
- Mike Calderon – engineering
- Brian Knapp Gardner – mastering
- Ed Korengo – mixing
- Kevin Hosmann – art direction
- Mario Castellanos – photography

== Charts ==
Chart (1992–1993)	Peak position
U.S. Billboard 200	24
U.S. Billboard Top R&B/Hip-Hop Albums	4

== Certifications ==
Region	Certification	Certified units/sales
United States (RIAA)	Gold	500,000^{^}
^{^} Shipments figures based on certification alone.
