= Crunchyroll, LLC =

American entertainment company

- Formerly: Funimation, Inc. (1994–2020) (Note: Exact name as shown on the Delaware corporations registry under file no. 2672363.); Funimation Productions, Ltd. (1994–2005, 2011–2020); Funimation Entertainment (2005–2011); Funimation Global Group, LLC (2020–2022)
- Type: Joint venture
- Industry: Entertainment
- Founded: May 9, 1994; 32 years ago, in Silicon Valley, California, U.S.
- Founder: Gen Fukunaga; Cindy Brennan
- Headquarters: 5750 Wilshire Boulevard, Suite 110, Los Angeles, California, U.S.
- Number of locations: 15 (2025)
- Key people: Rahul Purini (CEO); Gita Rebbapragada (COO); Asa Suehira (CCO)
- Products: Anime; Motion pictures; Video games; Soundtracks; Merchandise; Home video
- Services: Streaming; television
- Number of employees: 1000+ (2025)
- Parent: Navarre Corporation (2005–2011); Group 1200 Media (2011–2017); Sony Pictures Television (2017–2020); Aniplex (Note: A subsidiary of Sony Music Entertainment Japan.) (2019–present); Sony Pictures Entertainment (2020–present)
- Divisions: Crunchyroll Channel (joint venture with Game Show Network, LLC (Note: Crunchyroll, LLC and Game Show Network, LLC parent company Sony formed Crunchyroll Channel through a partnership between the two companies, despite both of them being owned by different divisions of Sony. Crunchyroll, LLC is owned by Sony Pictures and Aniplex, while Game Show Network, LLC is owned by Sony Pictures Television.)); Crunchyroll Games; Crunchyroll Manga; Crunchyroll Store; Crunchyroll EMEA; Crunchyroll Storyworks
- Subsidiaries: Crunchyroll Store Australia; Crunchyroll UK and Ireland; Crunchyroll Inc. (Note: Crunchyroll Inc. is the company's Japanese entity, primarily responsible for licensing and investments in production committees.); Hayate Inc. (joint venture with Aniplex)
- Website: www.crunchyroll.com

Crunchyroll, LLC is an American entertainment company focused on the distribution and production of Japanese animation. It currently operates the eponymous over-the-top subscription video on-demand streaming service.

The company was founded as Funimation (Note: This former name continued to be used for the company's streaming service from 2020 until its closure in 2024.) in May 1994 by Gen Fukunaga and his wife Cindy in Silicon Valley, with funding by Daniel Cocanougher and his family, who became investors in the company. The company then relocated to the Dallas–Fort Worth metropolitan area, first to North Richland Hills, then Flower Mound and later Coppell. Funimation was acquired by Navarre Corporation in May 2005; in April 2011, Navarre sold Funimation to Group 1200 Media, a company led by a group of investors that included Fukunaga, for $24 million. The company was acquired by Sony Pictures Television in 2017 and rebranded to Crunchyroll, LLC in March 2022 after acquiring the eponymous streaming service in August 2021.

The company also releases titles on home video either directly (with distribution by Sony Pictures Home Entertainment since 2024) or by having select anime titles released through its distribution partners (Sentai Filmworks, Viz Media, Discotek Media, Aniplex of America and Anime Limited).

== History ==
=== As Funimation ===
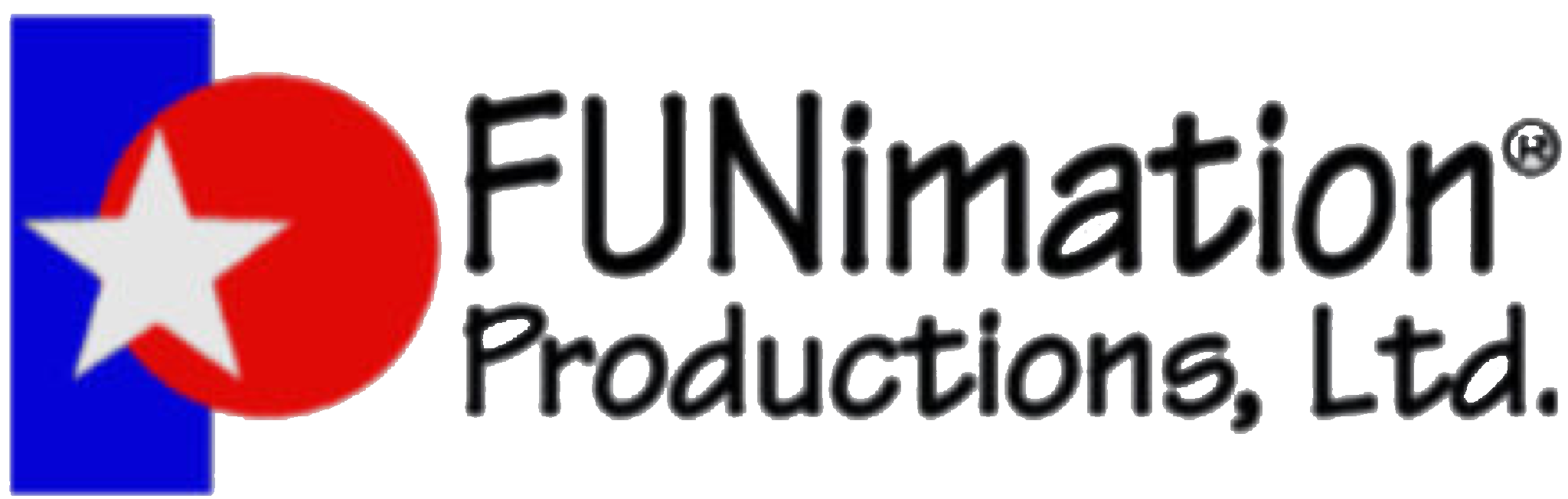
A variant of the original Funimation logo, which was used from May 1994 to May 2005

==== Early history ====
In the early 1990s, Japanese-born businessman Gen Fukunaga was approached by his uncle, Nagafumi Hori, who was working as a producer for Toei Company. Hori proposed that if Fukunaga could start a production company and raise enough money, Toei Animation would license the rights to the Dragon Ball franchise to the United States. Fukunaga met with co-worker Daniel Cocanougher, whose family owned a feed mill in Decatur, Texas, and convinced Cocanougher's family to sell their business and serve as an investor for his company.

The company was founded on May 9, 1994, as Funimation Productions. (Note: Stylized as FUNimation Productions.) The company was originally based in Silicon Valley, but eventually relocated to North Richland Hills, Texas. They initially collaborated with other companies on Dragon Ball/Dragon Ball Z, such as BLT Productions, Ocean Studios, Pioneer and Saban Entertainment. After two aborted attempts to bring the Dragon Ball franchise to television via first-run syndication, Cartoon Network began airing Dragon Ball Z as part of its Toonami programming block in 1998, which quickly became the highest-rated show on the block and garnered a large following. The success of Dragon Ball Z is credited for allowing Funimation to acquire other licensed titles. Funimation also produced and distributed the direct-to-video movie Chuck E. Cheese in the Galaxy 5000, the company's first non-anime product.

In May 2002, the company secured its first third-party home video deal when fellow anime dubbing company 4Kids Entertainment appointed Funimation as their exclusive home video distributor in the United States. The deal included a majority of products 4Kids licensed at the time, beginning with Yu-Gi-Oh!, Cubix, Cabbage Patch Kids, Tama and Friends, and Kirby: Right Back at Ya!. The deal was later expanded to include Sonic X, Teenage Mutant Ninja Turtles and Ultraman Tiga.

Following the success of the 4Kids deal, Funimation entered into a strategic partnership with the Canadian-based Nelvana on September 26, 2003. The deal allowed the two companies to work on the production of prospective new anime, and for Funimation to distribute over forty-four titles from Nelvana's library on home video; including Redwall, Pecola, Tales from the Cryptkeeper, Timothy Goes to School and the Disney Channel TV special The Santa Claus Brothers.

In July 2004, Funimation expanded its family-friendly offerings by launching a new division entitled Our Time Family Entertainment, which provided high-quality entertainment properties to the burgeoning preschool and children's market. Products released under the division included the film Little Nemo: Adventures in Slumberland, several holiday specials, and select offerings from Nelvana (Elliot Moose, Marvin the Tap-Dancing Horse, Timothy Goes to School), WGBH (Arthur and the co-production Time Warp Trio), and Alliance Atlantis (Connie the Cow).

Funimation continued into licensing non-anime material when the company was appointed as the North American license holder for the British series Make Way for Noddy by franchise owners Chorion in January 2005.

==== Acquisition by Navarre Corporation ====
On May 11, 2005, Funimation was acquired by Navarre Corporation for US$100.4 million in cash and 1.8 million shares of Navarre stock. As part of the acquisition, Gen Fukunaga was retained as head of the company, transitioning to the position of CEO, and the company's name was changed from Funimation Productions to Funimation Entertainment. (Note: Stylized as FUNimation Entertainment.) In 2007, Funimation moved from North Richland Hills, Texas to Flower Mound. Funimation moved into the Lakeside Business District with a ten-year lease.

According to an interview in February 2008 with Navarre Corporation CEO Cary Deacon, Funimation was in early stage negotiations to acquire some of the titles licensed through Geneon's USA division, which ceased operations in December 2007. In July 2008, Funimation confirmed that they had acquired distribution rights to several Geneon titles, including some that Geneon had left unfinished when they withdrew from the U.S. market. At Anime Expo 2008, Funimation announced that it had acquired over 30 titles from the Sojitz catalog that had previously been licensed by ADV Films. In 2009, Funimation signed a deal with Toei Animation to stream several of its anime titles online through the Funimation website.

==== Navarre divestiture; Nico Nico partnership ====
Funimation logo from 2005 to January 2016; a colored variant was used from May 2005 to mid 2011, while this variant was used from mid 2011 to January 2016.

On May 27, 2010, Navarre Corporation announced that it began negotiating a potential sale of Funimation. It was also announced that if the sale took place, Funimation would be reclassified as a "discounted operation" starting in the first quarter of 2011. On September 16, 2010, Navarre announced that six potential buyers were interested in acquiring Funimation. In the first quarter of 2011, Navarre reclassified Funimation as "discounted operations". On April 4, 2011, Navarre released a statement announcing that Funimation had been sold to a group of investors that included original owner Gen Fukunaga for $24 million. It was also announced that Navarre would remain as exclusive distributor of Funimation's titles.

On October 14, 2011, Funimation announced a partnership with Niconico, the English language version of Nico Nico Douga, to form the Funico brand for the licensing of anime for streaming and home video release. From this point on, virtually all titles simulcasted by Niconico were acquired by Funimation. On February 18, 2012, Funimation announced that it would launch its video streaming app on April 6, 2012. In 2014, Funimation released Dragon Ball Z: Battle of Gods to theaters in partnership with Screenvision. Based on its success, Funimation launched its own theatrical division in December 2014. On June 22, 2015, Funimation and Universal Pictures Home Entertainment announced a multi-year home video distribution deal. The deal allowed UPHE to manage distribution and sales of Funimation's catalog of titles. Universal began distributing Funimation's titles in October of that year.

In January 2016, Funimation introduced a new logo and announced their streaming service, FunimationNow. In April 2016, they launched their service in the UK and Ireland. On September 8, 2016, Funimation announced a partnership with Crunchyroll. Select Funimation titles would be streamed subtitled on Crunchyroll, while select Crunchyroll titles would be streamed on FunimationNow, including upcoming dubbed content. In addition, Funimation would act as the distributor for Crunchyroll's home video catalog.

==== Sony ownership ====
Logo from January 2016 to March 2022. It was still used for its streaming service until its closure in April 2024.

In May 2017, it was reported that Universal Studios and Sony Pictures Television were interested in purchasing Funimation; however, Universal decided not to proceed with the bidding. On July 31, 2017, Sony Pictures Television announced that it would buy a controlling 95% stake in Funimation for $143 million, a deal that was approved by the United States Department of Justice on August 22, 2017. This deal allowed Funimation to have synergies with Sony's Animax and Kids Station divisions and "direct access to the creative pipeline". The deal was closed on October 27, 2017.

On February 16, 2018, it was reported that Shout! Factory's Shout! Studios division acquired the U.S./Canadian distribution rights to Big Fish & Begonia and partnered with Funimation Films again for distribution. On July 12, 2018, it was announced that Funimation Films had picked up licensing rights for Dragon Ball Super: Broly in North America and that its English dub would premiere in theaters sometime in January 2019 in the United States and Canada, only around a month after its national premiere in Japan.

On August 7, AT&T fully acquired Otter Media, owner of Crunchyroll. On October 18, 2018, Funimation and Crunchyroll announced that their partnership with would end on November 9, 2018, as a result of Sony Pictures Television's acquisition of Funimation. Despite the home video releases being unaffected and still going on as planned, select Funimation content would be removed from Crunchyroll, and subtitled content would return to FunimationNow. Additionally, it was also announced that Funimation would be removed from Otter Media-owned streaming service VRV entirely, being replaced by Hidive. In December 2018, it was reported that another reason the partnership ended was due to a dispute concerning international expansion. On December 4, 2018, Funimation inked an exclusive multi-year first-look SVOD deal with Hulu.

On February 1, 2019, Gen Fukunaga announced that he would be stepping down as general manager, and transitioning to chairman of the company, with Colin Decker assuming the role of general manager in May 2019. On March 23, 2019, at AnimeJapan 2019, Funimation announced that they had partnered with Chinese streaming service Bilibili to jointly license anime titles for both the U.S. and Chinese markets. On May 29, Funimation announced that they had acquired Manga Entertainment's UK branch, and immediately consolidated the former's UK business into the latter's. On July 5, 2019, Funimation announced at Anime Expo that they had reached a streaming partnership with Right Stuf, with select titles from Nozomi Entertainment being made available on FunimationNow later in the year. On August 31, 2019, Aniplex of America announced on Twitter that they would be partnering with Funimation Films to co-release Rascal Does Not Dream of a Dreaming Girl theatrically in the U.S. on October 2, 2019, and in Canada on October 4, 2019.

==== Aniplex/Sony Pictures joint venture and international expansion ====
On September 24, 2019, Sony Pictures Television and Aniplex announced that they were consolidating their international anime streaming businesses under a new joint venture, Funimation Global Group, LLC., with Funimation general manager Colin Decker leading the joint venture. The joint venture would operate under Funimation's branding, and allow Funimation to acquire and distribute titles with Aniplex subsidiaries Wakanim, Madman Anime and AnimeLab. The first title under the joint venture, Fate/Grand Order - Absolute Demonic Front: Babylonia, would receive a 30-day exclusivity on FunimationNow, AnimeLab and Wakanim, and provide Funimation exclusive rights to the English dub for one year. In December, Funimation launched a "Decade of Anime" poll in which fans voted for their favorite anime across multiple categories.

On January 24, 2020, Funimation announced it would be merging its online catalog into AnimeLab for Australian and New Zealand audiences, and would shut down FunimationNow for Australia and New Zealand on March 30. On May 1, Funimation announced that they formed a partnership with Kodansha Comics to host a series of weekly watch parties. On May 4, Funimation announced that they had struck a deal with NIS America to stream select titles on FunimationNow. That same day, Funimation also announced that that they would hold a virtual anime convention called "FunimationCon" on July 3–4. It was one of several virtual events taking the place of that year's Anime Expo, which announced its cancellation on April 17.

On July 3, Funimation announced at FunimationCon that they would expand their streaming service to Latin America, starting with Mexico and Brazil in Q4 2020, with one of the first dubbed titles released being Tokyo Ghoul:re. Funimation later revealed that they would launch their Latin American services in December 2020. However, they launched their service early on November 18. On September 9, Funimation announced that they had reached a distribution partnership with Viz Media, with Viz Media titles being made available to stream on Funimation's website. The deal was made after select Viz titles such as Part I of Naruto and the first 75 episodes of Hunter × Hunter were previously made available on FunimationNow.

In November 2020, it was reported that Funimation began the process of relocating to a new office building in the Cypress Waters development complex in Coppell, which opened in 2021. On November 24, Funimation announced they had partnered with Sunrise to stream select Gundam titles such as Mobile Suit Gundam, Mobile Suit Gundam SEED, and later Mobile Suit Gundam Wing and Mobile Suit Zeta Gundam. Some Gundam titles already streamed on Funimation prior to said partnership like Mobile Suit Gundam: Iron-Blooded Orphans.

On December 2, Brazilian TV channel Loading announced a content partnership with Sony. Several days later, it was officially announced that Funimation titles were included in the partnership. The announcement also led to the creation of a program titled Funimation TV.

To unify the company's image abroad, Manga Entertainment was rebranded as Funimation UK in the UK and Ireland on April 19, 2021, while AnimeLab relaunched under the Funimation brand in Australia and New Zealand on June 1. Afterward, Funimation launched their streaming services to three South American countries of Colombia, Chile, and Peru on June 16. On September 1, Funimation and Gonzo announced a partnership to upload select remastered titles on their respective YouTube channels until November 30. These titles were Ragnarok the Animation, Witchblade and Burst Angel.

=== As Crunchyroll ===
==== Rebranding ====
On December 9, 2020, Sony Pictures Entertainment announced that it would acquire Ellation and the anime streaming service Crunchyroll from WarnerMedia (later spun out by AT&T and merged with Discovery, Inc. to form Warner Bros. Discovery) for a total of US$1.175 billion in cash, placing the company under Funimation once the acquisition was finalized. However, on March 24, 2021, it was reported that the United States Department of Justice had extended its antitrust review of the acquisition. The acquisition of Crunchyroll was completed on August 9, 2021, with Sony stating in their press release that they would create a unified anime subscription using their anime businesses as soon as possible. Crunchyroll confirmed four days later that VRV was included in the acquisition.

On January 25, 2022, Crunchyroll announced that they were going to release Jujutsu Kaisen 0 in theaters on March 18, 2022, in the United States and Canada. The film launched in over 1,500 theaters, as well as some IMAX theatres, in both sub and dub. They also stated that the feature would be coming soon to theaters in the United Kingdom, Ireland, Australia, New Zealand, France, Germany, and Latin America among other countries. This is the first Crunchyroll film to be distributed in association with Funimation Films.

On March 1, 2022, it was announced that the Funimation, Wakanim and VRV SVOD services would be consolidated into Crunchyroll. Additionally, it was announced that Funimation Global Group, LLC had legally changed its name to Crunchyroll, LLC, which occurred on February 24. Fourteen days later, it was announced that Funimation's home video releases would be distributed under the Crunchyroll banner, with the latter's logo replacing that of the former on the spine and back of the covers for each new release that comes out starting with its June 2022 slate. Following the Russian military invasion of Ukraine, Crunchyroll announced on March 11, 2022, that it would halt services in Russia, thus shutting down operations of Wakanim and Crunchyroll EMEA entirely, in line with global sanctions. Its parent company Sony donated $2 million in humanitarian aid to Ukraine.

On April 5, 2022, the company announced that Funimation's YouTube channel was rebranded as "Crunchyroll Dubs", and that it would serve as Crunchyroll's channel for English-dubbed content; while English-subtitled content would still be uploaded to their "Crunchyroll Collection" channel. The company also stated that they would release an English-dubbed first episode of an anime series every Saturday at 3:00 pm. ET on the channel, starting with Re:Zero − Starting Life in Another World on April 9, 2022. Three days later, another announcement was made in that the Funimation Shop would be moved to the Crunchyroll Store.

Two weeks later, CEO Colin Decker stepped down from his position. He was replaced by COO Rahul Purini. As a result of the merger in March 2022, pre-existing titles such as My Hero Academia, Uzaki-chan Wants to Hang Out!, and others that were streaming on Funimation remained along with newer seasons until a full migration of its licensed catalog was transferred over to Crunchyroll. New series such as A Couple of Cuckoos and Spy × Family were only released on Crunchyroll, albeit with the dubbing production done in the Dallas studios. On August 4, 2022, Crunchyroll acquired anime eCommerce retailer and distributor Right Stuf. Right Stuf's adult/hentai sales and distribution were spun off to a separate company as part of the deal.

On September 20, 2022, Kyle McCarley's contract to voice Shigeo Kageyama, the protagonist of Mob Psycho 100, was not renewed by Crunchyroll. McCarley, who is a member of SAG-AFTRA, had offered to work on a non-union contract for the third season, on the condition that Crunchyroll meet with SAG-AFTRA representatives to discuss potential future contracts. Crunchyroll refused the offer, sparking criticism from anime fans and media outlets.

The company opened an office in Mumbai, India in October 2022. In February 2023, Crunchyroll laid off 85 staff as part of employee redundancy between the 13 offices including its main Coppell headquarters and Culver City offices.

In September 2023, Crunchyroll announced that Right Stuf would be merged into Crunchyroll Store in October 2023, with Crunchyroll adopting the Right Stuf pricing and shipping practices, shutting down in the process. On March 5, 2024, Crunchyroll opened a tech development and shared services center in Hyderabad, India.

Sony shut down the Funimation streaming service on April 2, 2024. On August 15, 2024, Crunchyroll announced that it began rolling out the campaign to launch its streaming service in India and Indonesia, complete with local subs and dubs in most of the newly-added titles for the South Asian and Southeast Asian regions.

In March 2025, Crunchyroll, LLC and Aniplex established the Japanese animation studio Hayate, Inc., a joint venture between the two companies based in Tokyo focused on planning, developing, and producing anime for the Crunchyroll streaming service. An undisclosed number of employees were laid off in August 2025 while the company was in the process of building engineering hubs in the United States, Mexico, and India.

== Distribution ==
In July 2008, Funimation and Red Planet Media announced the launch of a mobile video on demand service for AT&T Mobility and Sprint mobile phone subscribers. Three titles were part of the launch, Gunslinger Girl, Tsukuyomi: Moon Phase, and The Galaxy Railways, with entire seasons of each made available.

Until 2016, Funimation did not directly release its properties in non-North American (English language speaking) markets, and instead sub-licensed its properties to other companies such as the UK branch of Manga Entertainment and Anime Limited in the United Kingdom.

In 2016, Funimation began directly releasing some of its titles in the United Kingdom and Ireland with Funimation branding, with Funimation handling licensing and localization, and Anime Limited handling distribution and classification. Funimation later distributed My Hero Academia in the region through Universal Pictures (UK) Ltd in 2017, and later through Sony Pictures UK, along with other select titles, in 2018. Funimation later began sub-licensing titles to Manga Entertainment's UK branch in late 2018, before acquiring the company on May 29, 2019, and releasing titles directly. On September 24, 2019, Sony Pictures Television and Aniplex consolidated their international anime streaming businesses, with Funimation becoming the leading company for the group.

Funimation also began directly distributing its titles in Australia and New Zealand in 2017. Similar to the UK and Ireland, select titles were released through Universal Sony Pictures Home Entertainment from 2017 to 2018. From September 2018, Funimation transferred distribution to Madman Anime, with the company handling distribution and classification within the region. Madman Anime was later consolidated into Funimation in 2019.

== Lawsuits ==
=== Anti-piracy ===
In 2005, Funimation's legal department began to pursue a more aggressive approach toward protecting the company's licensed properties. They started sending "cease and desist" (C&D) letters to sites offering links to fansubs of their titles. This move was similar to that taken by the now-defunct ADV Films several years before with several major torrent sites.

Funimation's legal department served C&D letters for series that had not yet been advertised or announced as licensed, including Tsubasa: Reservoir Chronicle, Black Cat, and SoltyRei, with a few known series also mentioned in the letter. Funimation revealed more licenses on October 6, 2006, when it sent letters to torrent sites demanding that distribution of xxxHolic's TV series, Mushishi, Ragnarok the Animation, and other series cease.

Since October 2009, Funimation routinely filed DMCA takedown notices to get unauthorized distributions of its and its partners' properties removed from Google search results. (Note: As of October 2012, the Chilling Effects search engine is broken, but Google search results for site:lumendatabase.org funimation reveal the DMCA notices received and processed so far.)

In January 2011, Funimation filed a lawsuit against BitTorrent users in the U.S. for allegedly downloading and uploading One Piece. Funimation dropped the suit in March after a Northern Texas judge, having already indicated that the court would appoint attorneys for the defendants, ruled that the defendants were not "acting in concert" and thus could not be sued as a group; each would have to be sued separately.

The One Piece film at issue was a fansub, an unauthorized copy distributed with fan-produced, translated subtitles. Soon after the lawsuit was abandoned, Funimation was reported to have long been deriving dubs from fansubs. Nevertheless, Funimation continued to hold their stance that fansubbing was harmful to the anime industry, stating "The practices of illegal downloads and 'fansubbing' are very harmful to our Japanese partners and [...] we have been asked to monitor and take action against unauthorized distribution of these titles. Because we believe that this will benefit the industry, we have agreed to do so." Sites which distributed fansubs or separate fan-created subtitles remained a frequent target of civil actions by Funimation and other anime companies, as well as criminal prosecution in at least one case.

Two months after failing to sue BitTorrent users in the North Texas district, Funimation engaged in forum shopping and proceeded to sue 1,427 defendants in the neighboring East Texas district for acting "in concert" to infringe copyright on The Legend Is Born: Ip Man. This case was allowed to proceed. However, the court dismissed the case against all remaining defendants with prejudice, on October 17, 2013.

=== Disputes with partners ===
In November 2011, Funimation sued A.D. Vision, AEsir Holdings, Section23 Films, Valkyrie Media Partners, Seraphim Studios, Sentai Filmworks and its CEO, John Ledford and Switchblade Pictures for a sum of $8 million, citing "breach of contracts" and other issues. Funimation said that ADV's transfer of assets were made with "the intent to defer, hinder or defraud the creditors of ADV [Films]." Funimation sought ADV's sale of assets as void. The lawsuit was settled in mediation in 2014. The terms of the settlement were not disclosed.

=== Vic Mignogna lawsuit ===
In early 2019, allegations of sexual misconduct against voice actor Vic Mignogna were brought forward on Twitter with the MeToo movement. Funimation conducted an internal investigation of the matter and announced on February 11, 2019, that they had ended their relations with Mignogna. Mignogna had already been dismissed from the company in January 2019. On April 19, 2019, Mignogna filed a civil suit against Funimation and voice actors Jamie Marchi, Monica Rial, and Rial's fiancé, Ron Toye. Mignogna and his attorney were seeking a monetary relief of over $1 million. On June 12, 2019, Funimation filed a response denying Mignogna's allegations. On July 1, 2019, Funimation filed an anti-SLAPP motion for Mignogna to dismiss his lawsuit. Rial, Marchi, and Toye then filed their anti-SLAPP motions on July 19, 2019. A hearing to consider the defendants's anti-SLAPP motions took place on September 6, 2019, presiding Tarrant County judge John P. Chupp dismissed the civil suit against Marchi. On October 4, 2019, the civil suit against Funimation, Rial, and Toye was dismissed.

On October 24, 2019, Mignogna filed an appeal against the dismissal. On October 30, 2019, Rial, Toye, Marchi, and Funimation filed a motion to have Mignogna's appeal dismissed, which was subsequently denied. On November 5, 2019, Funimation filed a motion to recover attorney's fees, costs, and sanctions related to the lawsuit. On November 27, 2019, Tarrant County judge John P. Chupp ruled that Mignogna had to pay a total of $238,042.42 in attorney's fees and sanctions to Rial, Toye, Marchi, and Funimation.

=== Kojicast lawsuit ===
On April 24, 2019, Kojicast filed a lawsuit against Funimation claiming that the company's FunimationNow streaming service was an infringement on Kojicast's patent.

=== Shop lawsuit ===
On January 13, 2021, Jenisa Angeles filed a class-action lawsuit against Funimation, claiming that their online store failed to comply with the Americans with Disabilities Act. The suit was settled out of court. The terms of the settlement were not disclosed.
