= Jackin' for Beats =

Mixtape by OMG
- Released: 2012
- Recorded: 2010–2012
- Genre: West Coast hip-hop
- Length: 30:38
- Label: Lench Mob
- Producer: Crazy Toones

Jackin' for Beats is the debut mixtape from rapper and actor O'Shea Jackson Jr. (OMG), son of the rapper Ice Cube. The 10-track mixtape was hosted by DJ Crazy Toones, the official DJ for Ice Cube and WC. OMG's debut was on his father's album I Am the West with his brother Doughboy. In this mixtape, OMG shows similarities to his father's tone, enunciation and humor, while adding his own vocals over some of the standout tracks of today.

== Track listing ==
| No. | Title | Length |
|---|---|---|
| 1. | "Can't Nobody Whip The Kid / House Party" | 2:25 |
| 2. | "Get Big" | 1:55 |
| 3. | "You're Everything" | 3:13 |
| 4. | "No Hands" | 2:42 |
| 5. | "Oh My God" | 3:40 |
| 6. | "Kush" | 4:18 |
| 7. | "Marvin & Chardonnay" | 1:48 |
| 8. | "Motto" | 2:32 |
| 9. | "Forever" | 5:24 |
| 10. | "The One" | 2:36 |

== Instrumental listing ==
| No. | Title | Artist | Writer(s) | Producer(s) | Length |
|---|---|---|---|---|---|
| 1. | "House Party" | Meek Mill (feat. Young Chris) | Robert Williams, Christopher F. Ries | The Beat Bully | 4:21 |
| 2. | "Get Big" | Dorrough (feat. Nitti) | Dorrough, Chadron Moore, Tiffany Johnson | Nitti | 3:45 |
| 3. | "You're Everything" | Bun B (feat. Rick Ross, David Banner, 8Ball, and MJG) | | Mr. Lee | 4:36 |
| 4. | "No Hands" | Waka Flocka Flame (feat. Roscoe Dash and Wale) | Juaquin Malphurs, Jeffery Johnson Jr., N. Cobey, Olubowale Victor Folarin | Drumma Boy | 4:22 |
| 5. | "Tupac Back" | Meek Mill (feat. Rick Ross) | Robert Williams, William Roberts II, Michael Williams, Marquel Middlebrooks | Mike WiLL Made It, Marz | 3:56 |
| 6. | "Kush" | Dr. Dre (feat. Snoop Dogg and Akon) | K. Rahman, A. Young, A. Thiam, A. Johnson, D. Tannenbaum, A. Ransom, M. Jones, B. Honeycutt | DJ Khalil | 3:55 |
| 7. | "Marvin & Chardonnay" | Big Sean (feat. Kanye West and Roscoe Dash) | Sean Anderson, Kanye West, Jeffrey Johnson, Andrew Wansel | Pop Wansel, Mike Dean | 3:43 |
| 8. | "The Motto" | Drake (feat. Lil Wayne) | Shahid Reshi, Aubrey Graham, Dwayne Carter, N.Cobey, Tyler Williams, Salvatore Casto | T-Minus | 3:02 |
| 9. | "Forever" | Drake (feat. Kanye West, Lil Wayne, and Eminem) | Drake, Kanye West, Lil Wayne, Eminem | Boi-1da | 5:58 |
| 10. | "The One" | Slaughterhouse (feat. The New Royales) | Ryan Montgomery, Dominick Wickliffe, Joseph Anthony Budden II, Joell Ortiz, Khalil Abdul-Rahman | DJ Khalil | 3:40 |
