= Dangerous Ground (soundtrack) =

Soundtrack album by Various artists
- Released: February 11, 1997
- Recorded: 1996
- Studios: Battery Studios (New York, NY); Creator's Way Studios (Chicago, IL); Greene Street Studios (New York, NY); Hit Factory (New York, NY); House Of Sound (New York, NY); Rockin' Reel Studios (East Northport, NY); Scarface Sound West (Redwood City, CA); The Mob Shop (Fairfield, CA); Oakland City Studios (California); Westside Studios (California); Let's Do This
- Genres: West Coast hip hop; East Coast hip hop; gangsta rap
- Length: 1:05:35
- Label: Jive
- Producers: Dana Sano (exec.); Jonathan McHugh (exec.); Lori Silfen (exec.); Toby Emmerich (exec.); Ice Cube (also exec.); Studio Ton; Irv Gotti; Pete Rock; The Ummah; The Legendary Traxster; Marc Niles; Kevin Gardner; Robert Redwine; KRS-One; Anthony Dent; Dogon; Paris; Cursdog; Larry "Rock" Campbell; Lil' Doe Doe; B-Legit (co.); L.A. Ganz (co.)

Singles from Dangerous Ground
- 1. "The World Is Mine" Released: January 13, 1997; 2. "Ghetto Smile" Released: 1997

Professional ratings
Review scores
Source	Rating
Allmusic	2.5/5 stars

Music From the Original Motion Picture Soundtrack Dangerous Ground is the original soundtrack to Darrell Roodt's 1997 action thriller film Dangerous Ground. It was released on February 11, 1997 via Jive Records, and entirely composed of hip hop music songs.

The album peaked on the US Billboard charts at number 20 on the Billboard 200 and number 3 on the Top R&B/Hip-Hop Albums, and spawned two singles: "The World Is Mine" by the film's star Ice Cube, and "Ghetto Smile" by B-Legit and Daryl Hall. "The World Is Mine" made it to number 55 on the Hot R&B/Hip-Hop Songs chart and number 39 on the Hot Rap Songs chart in the United States.

Along with singles, music videos were released for both singles to promote the soundtrack and film releases.

== Track listing ==
No.	Title	Producer(s)	Length
1.	"The World Is Mine" (performed by Ice Cube, Mack 10 & K-Dee)	Ice Cube	3:07
2.	"You're Only a Customer" (performed by Jay-Z)	Irv Gotti	4:15
3.	"The Only Way" (performed by Celly Cel)	Studio Ton	3:57
4.	"Keep on Pushin'" (performed by MC Lyte, Bahamadia, Nonchalant & Yo-Yo)	Pete Rock	4:26
5.	"Dangerous Ground" (performed by Keith Murray & 50 Grand)	The Ummah	3:40
6.	"Mr. Shit Talker" (performed by Mystikal)	The Legendary Traxster	4:00
7.	"Buddup Bap" (performed by Whitey Don)	Marc Niles	4:45
8.	"Fa-Show" (performed by K-Dee)	Ice Cube	3:50
9.	"Ghetto Smile" (performed by B-Legit & Daryl Hall)	Kevin Gardner; Robert Redwine; B-Legit (co.)	4:17
10.	"Perhaps She'll Die" (performed by KRS-One)	KRS-One	3:44
11.	"It's Alright" (performed by Too $hort & UGK)	Anthony Dent; Dogon	5:05
12.	"Struggled & Strived" (performed by The Click & Levitti)	Studio Ton	4:09
13.	"2 Hands and a Razor" (performed by Spice 1)	Paris	4:12
14.	"Murder" (performed by Crooked)	Cursdog	3:43
15.	"Count on Me" (performed by L.A. Ganz)	Larry "Rock" Campbell; L.A. Ganz (co.)	5:20
16.	"Chocolate Chips" (performed by Lil' Doe Doe)	Lil' Doe Doe; Ice Cube (co.)	3:05
Total length:			1:05:35

== Re-releases ==
- "Ghetto Smile" was originally released on B-Legit's 1996 album, The Hemp Museum.
- "Dangerous Ground" was originally released on Keith Murray's 1996 album, Enigma.
- "2 Hands and a Razor" was later re-released on Spice 1's 1997 album, The Black Bossalini.
- "You're Only a Customer" was later used in the 1998 film Streets Is Watching and was released on the film's soundtrack.
- "The Only Way" was later re-released on Celly Cel's 2002 compilation album, Song'z U Can't Find.
- "The World Is Mine" was later re-released on Ice Cube's 2007 compilation album, In the Movies.

== Charts ==
=== Weekly charts ===
Chart (1997)	Peak position
US Billboard 200	20
US Top R&B/Hip-Hop Albums (Billboard)	3

=== Year-end charts ===
Chart (1997)	Position
US Top R&B/Hip-Hop Albums (Billboard)	96
