= The Players Club (soundtrack) =

The Players Club: Music From and Inspired by the New Line Cinema Motion Picture

Soundtrack album by Various artists
- Released: March 17, 1998
- Recorded: 1997–1998
- Genres: Hip hop; R&B
- Length: 1:02:53
- Labels: Heavyweight Records, A&M Records
- Producers: Ice Cube (exec.); Terry Carter (co-exec.); Rick "Dutch" Cousin; Glen Brunman; Binky Mack; Bud'da; Chad "Dr. Ceuss" Elliot; Craig B; DJ Battlecat; DJ Clue?; Joseph "Adonis" Carn; DURO; Edmund Clement; Frank Fitzpatrick; Michael Angelo Saulsberry; Mo-Suave-A; Rhett Lawrence; Tim & Bob

Singles from The Players Club
- 1. "We Be Clubbin'" Released: December 18, 1997; 2. "Same Tempo" Released: March 17, 1998; 3. "Splackavellie" Released: 1998

Professional ratings
Review scores
Source	Rating
AllMusic	4/5 stars

The Players Club: Music From and Inspired by the New Line Cinema Motion Picture is the soundtrack to Ice Cube's 1998 film The Players Club. It was released on March 17, 1998, through Heavyweight Records, Epic Records and Sony Music Soundtrax and consists of hip hop and contemporary R&B music. The album features songs from the film's star, Ice Cube, as well as Mr. Short Khop, Brownstone, Changing Faces, Dalvin DeGrate, DJ Spinderella, DMX, Jay-Z, Kurupt, Lil' Mo, Mack 10, Master P, Memphis Bleek, Mia X, Pressha, Public Announcement, Sauce Money, Scarface and more.

The soundtrack made it to number 10 on the Billboard 200 and number 2 on the Top R&B/Hip-Hop Albums chart in the United States.

== Track listing ==
No.	Title	Producer(s)	Length
1.	"We Be Clubbin'" (performed by Ice Cube)	Rick "Dutch" Cousin	4:47
2.	"We Be Clubbin' (Clark World Remix)'" (performed by Ice Cube & DMX)	Rick "Dutch" Cousin	4:23
3.	"Who Are You Lovin'" (performed by Ice Cube & Mr. Short Khop)	Mo-Suave-A	4:30
4.	"Same Tempo" (performed by Changing Faces)	Edmund Clement	4:52
5.	"Under Pressure" (performed by Kurupt)	Battlecat	4:04
6.	"You Know I'm a Ho" (performed by Ice Cube & Master P)	Bud'da	4:17
7.	"Splackavellie" (performed by Pressha)	Joseph "Adonis" Carn	4:01
8.	"You Delinquent" (performed by Mack 10 & Scarface)	Rick "Dutch" Cousin; Binky Mack	3:55
9.	"From Marcy to Hollywood" (performed by Jay-Z, Memphis Bleek & Sauce Money)	DJ Clue; DURO	3:11
10.	"Don't Play Me Wrong" (performed by Brownstone)	Rhett Lawrence	4:28
11.	"Shake Whatcha Mama Gave Ya (But Make Sho Your Niggas Pay Ya)" (performed by Mia X)	Craig B	4:17
12.	"What a Woman Feels" (performed by Public Announcement)	Frank Fitzpatrick; Michael Angelo Saulsberry	3:33
13.	"Don't Worry (My Shorty)" (performed by Rufus Blaq & Spinderella)	Chad "Dr. Ceuss" Elliot	3:56
14.	"My Loved One" (performed by Ice Cube & Mr. Short Khop)	Binky Mack	4:32
15.	"Get Mine" (performed by Mr. Dalvin of Jodeci)	Tim & Bob	4:07
16.	"Dreamin'" (performed by EMmage, Mr. Short Khop & Lil' Mo)	Bud'da
Total length:			1:02:53

== Charts ==
=== Weekly charts ===
Chart (1998)	Peak position
US Billboard 200	10
US Top R&B/Hip-Hop Albums (Billboard)	2

=== Year-end charts ===
Chart (1998)	Position
US Billboard 200	89
US Top R&B/Hip-Hop Albums (Billboard)	19

== Certifications ==
Region	Certification	Certified units/sales
United States (RIAA)	Platinum	1,000,000^{^}
^{^} Shipments figures based on certification alone.
