= Been There, Done That (Dr. Dre song) =

Single by Dr. Dre

from the album Dr. Dre Presents: The Aftermath
- Released: November 1996
- Studio: Record One (Sherman Oaks, California)
- Genre: West Coast hip-hop; G-funk
- Length: 5:11
- Label: Aftermath; Interscope
- Songwriters: Andre Young; Stephen Anderson; James Anderson
- Producers: Dr. Dre; Bud'da

Dr. Dre singles chronology
"No Diggity" (1996)	"Been There, Done That" (1996)	"Ghetto Fabulous" (1998)

Music video
- "Been There, Done That" on YouTube

"Been There, Done That" is a song by American rapper and producer Dr. Dre, released in November 1996 as the second single from the compilation album, Dr. Dre Presents: The Aftermath.

== Background and reception ==
The song was produced by Dre himself and features co-production from Bud'da. The lyrics were written by former Death Row Records labelmate, J-Flexx. After Dre's departure from the label, J-Flexx released a diss song on the Death Row Greatest Hits compilation titled "Who Been There, Who Done That". The song was referenced at the end of "Guilty Conscience" by Eminem, which was a collaboration with Dre.

Mosi Reeves from Rolling Stone said: "Fans respected Dre's call to renounce violence and focus on making money, but 'Been There, Done That' didn't quite resonate with them like his earlier work", adding, "'Been There, Done That' is an early example of what would later be called 'grown-man rap', and as rap stars age and try to reconcile their maturity with their hellion public images, it deserves a special place in the Dre canon".

== Live performances ==
Dr. Dre performed the song live on Saturday Night Live on October 26, 1996.

== Track listing ==
- CD single
1. "Been There, Done That" (Radio Edit) - 4:06
2. "Been There, Done That" (Video Mix) - 5:14
3. "Been There, Done That" (Video Mix Instrumental) - 5:14
- 12" vinyl
1. "Been There, Done That" (LP Version) - 5:14
2. "Been There, Done That" (Radio Edit) - 4:06
3. "Been There, Done That" (LP Instrumental) - 5:14

== Charts ==
Chart (1997)	Peak position
New Zealand (Recorded Music NZ)	39
