= O'Shea Jackson Jr. =

American actor, rapper and songwriter (born 1991)

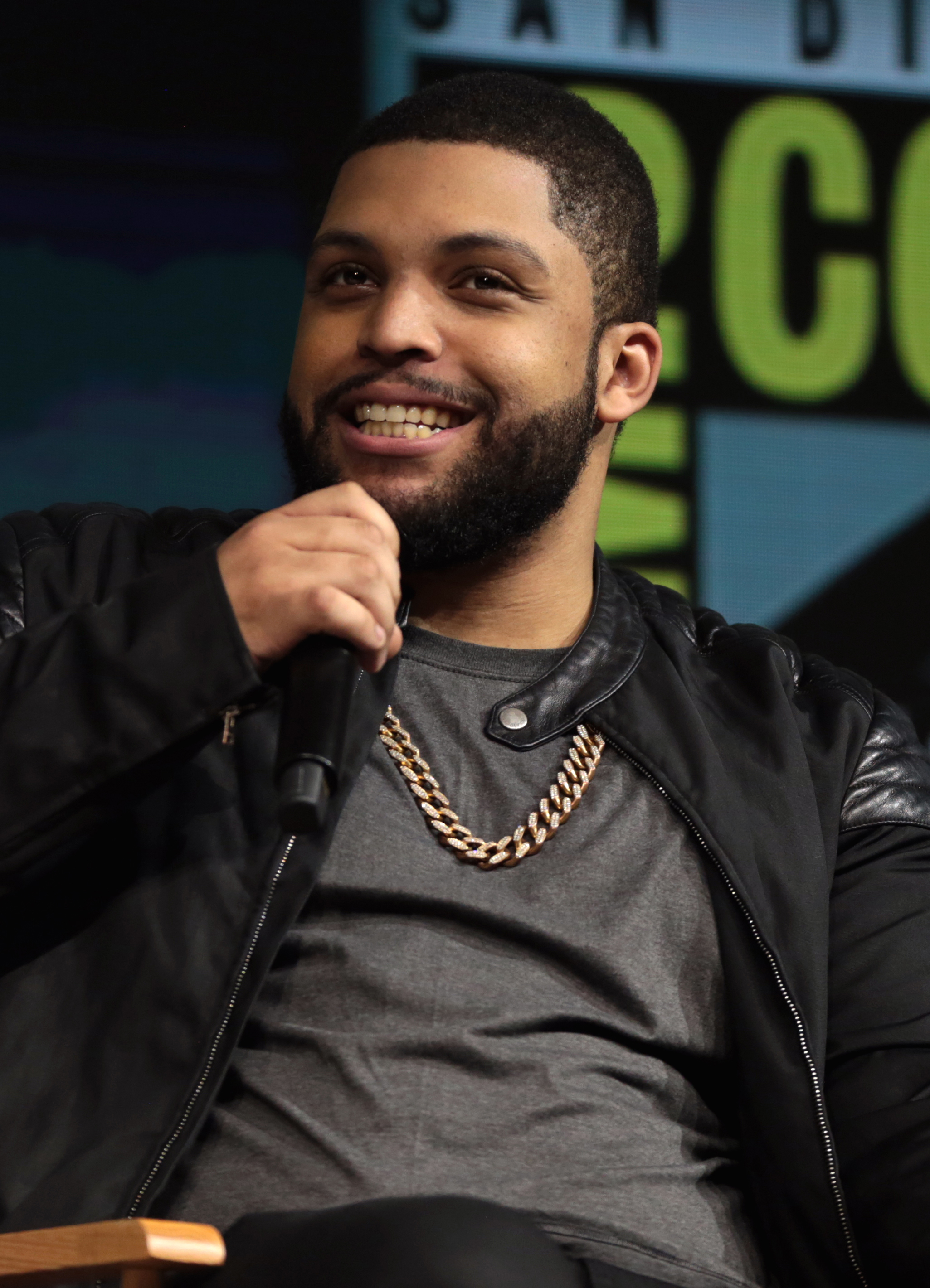
- Jackson at the 2018 San Diego Comic-Con
- Born: February 24, 1991 (age 35); Los Angeles, California, U.S.
- Other name: OMG
- Education: University of Southern California
- Occupations: Actor; rapper; songwriter
- Years active: 2007–present
- Children: 1
- Father: Ice Cube
- Musical career
- Genres: Hip-hop; gangsta rap
- Label: Lench Mob

O'Shea Jackson Jr. (born February 24, 1991), also known by the stage name OMG, is an American actor, rapper and songwriter. He is the second born child of Ice Cube and Kimberly Woodruff. In his feature film debut, he portrayed his father in the 2015 biopic film Straight Outta Compton.

== Early life ==
Jackson was born in Los Angeles, to O'Shea Jackson Sr., better known as Ice Cube, and Kimberly Woodruff. Jackson was raised in the San Fernando Valley, and is the second child of four children. He has an older brother name Darrell, from a previous relationship of Ice Cube’s who is also a rapper—and a younger brother named Shareef, as well as a younger sister, Kareema. Like his father, Jackson attended William Howard Taft High School in Woodland Hills, California, from which he graduated in 2009. Jackson attended the University of Southern California, where he studied screenwriting, but dropped out to pursue his acting career.

== Career ==
=== Film ===
In June 2014, it was announced that Jackson had been cast to portray his father, Ice Cube, in Straight Outta Compton, a biographical film about N.W.A. The film was released on August 14, 2015, to positive reviews. Jackson is noted for his physical resemblance to his father, which Ice Cube described to Jimmy Kimmel in October 2014 as "spot-on. He was born to play the part."

In 2017, Jackson played Dan Pinto, the Batman-obsessed aspiring screenwriter, landlord and love interest of Aubrey Plaza's character Ingrid Thorburn in the film Ingrid Goes West, with many critics—including the Los Angeles Times, Vulture, and Collider—commenting on his scene-stealing abilities. In 2018, Jackson starred in the film Den of Thieves, which also included 50 Cent and Gerard Butler.

Jackson appears in two May 2019 movies. He has a supporting role as Lance in the romantic comedy Long Shot alongside Charlize Theron and Seth Rogen, playing the best friend of Rogen's character. In Godzilla: King of the Monsters, he portrays Barnes, the leader of the G-Team, the special military forces group specializing in battles involving Titans.

Also in 2019, Jackson co-starred with Michael B. Jordan, Jamie Foxx, and Brie Larson in the drama Just Mercy. He portrays Anthony Ray Hinton, who spent 30 years behind bars after being wrongfully convicted of murder.

=== Music ===
In 2010, Jackson and his brother Darrell were featured on the songs "She Couldn't Make It On Her Own" and "Y'all Know How I Am", from their father's album I Am the West.

In March 2012, Jackson, under the name OMG, released his first mixtape, Jackin' for Beats, online. Jazmine Gray of Vibe said, "True to its title, the hip-hop rookie offers his own lyrics over the beats of some of the most popular tracks of the year. The 10-track tape finds the son of a hip hop icon off to a promising start."

In an interview with XXL Magazine, Jackson said that "Some people say I sound like OMG. No one has compared me or tried to match me up with other artists."

In 2015, Jackson appeared in Pia Mia's music video for her song "Touch". He also appeared in American hip hop duo Twenty88's music video, "Out of Love", promoting their self-titled debut extended play.

=== Television ===
On February 6, 2018, Jackson played hip hop legend Kool Herc in a segment of Drunk History. On October 4, 2019, Jackson made a guest appearance on the debut of WWE SmackDown on Fox.

Jackson starred opposite Dave Franco in the comedy series The Now. It was originally set to be released on Quibi, but was ultimately released on The Roku Channel on December 10, 2021.

In the 2021 basketball drama show, Swagger, Jackson plays Ike Edwards, a former rising star who struggles to coach a young high-stake basketball team. The series premiered on October 29, 2021 on Apple TV+.

He played Kawlan Roken in the Disney+ Star Wars series, Obi-Wan Kenobi. On May 15, 2025, Jackson made a special guest appearance on that night's edition of TNA Impact!.

== Personal life ==
Jackson has a daughter, Jordan Reign Jackson, born in August 2017 with his ex-girlfriend, Jackie Garcia. He is a fan of professional wrestling (in which he has his own podcast recapping the sports' most recent events called No Contest Wrestling), the Los Angeles Kings of the NHL, the Los Angeles Rams in the NFL and anime, including Dragon Ball Z, One Piece and Pokémon.

== Filmography ==
=== Film ===
Year	Title	Role	Notes
2009	Janky Promoters	DJ Dolla	Uncredited
2015	Straight Outta Compton	Ice Cube	
2017	Ingrid Goes West	Daniel "Dan" Pinto	
2018	Den of Thieves	Donnie Wilson	
2019	Long Shot	Lance	
2019	Godzilla: King of the Monsters	Chief Warrant Officer Jackson Barnes	
2019	Just Mercy	Anthony Ray Hinton	
2023	Cocaine Bear	Daveed	
2025	Den of Thieves 2: Pantera	Donnie Wilson	
2026	Idiots	Davis	
TBA	Lone Wolf		Post-production

=== Television ===
Year	Title	Role	Notes
2018	Drunk History	DJ Kool Herc	1 episode
2021	The Premise	Cooper	1 episode
2021	The Now	Coop	Miniseries, 9 episodes
2021–2023	Swagger	Ike	Main role, 18 episodes
2022	Obi-Wan Kenobi	Kawlan Roken	Miniseries, 3 episodes

=== Web series ===
Year	Title	Role	Notes
2026	Patrick Foxy Show	Patrick Foxy	Voice

== Discography ==
Year	Title	type	Other notes
2012	Jackin' for Beats	Mixtape	
2014	"OMG"	Single	produced by Foreign Allegiance
2015	"Ain't No Place"	Single	produced by Foreign Allegiance

Guest appearances

Year	Song	Artist	Album
2010	"She Couldn't Make It On Her Own"	Ice Cube (feat. OMG & Doughboy)	I Am the West
2010	"Y'all Know How I Am"	Ice Cube (feat. OMG, Doughboy, WC & Young Maylay)	I Am the West
