= Are U Xperienced? =

Studio album by Yomo & Maulkie
- Released: September 17, 1991
- Recorded: 1991
- Studio: Audio Achievements (Torrance, California)
- Genres: West Coast hip hop; gangsta rap; hardcore rap
- Length: 52:37
- Labels: Ruthless; Atlantic
- Producers: Eazy-E (exec.); DJ Yella

Singles from Are U Xperienced?
- 1. "Mama Don't" Released: 1991; 2. "Mockingbird" Released: 1991; 3. "Glory / Are U Xperienced" Released: 1991

Professional ratings
Review scores
Source	Rating
AllMusic	3/5 stars

Are U Xperienced? is the debut and only studio album by American hip hop duo Yomo & Maulkie. It was named after the Jimi Hendrix 1967 album Are You Experienced. It was released on September 17, 1991 via Eazy-E's Ruthless Records, and was produced by DJ Yella. Though the album was met with some positive reviews, it was a commercial failure and did not appear on any album charts. Three singles were released: "Mama Don't", "Mockingbird", "Glory"/"Are U Xperienced?", but the only single "Glory" made it to the Billboard charts, peaking at number 7 on the Hot Rap Songs. Labelmates Jimmy Z and Jewell were featured on the album.

Parts of the song "For the Love of Money" (including Jewell's backing vocals) were later recycled on the track "Foe tha Love of $", as well as an accompanying instrumental track, "Moe Cheese", by Bone Thugs-n-Harmony, from their 1994 extended play Creepin on ah Come Up.

== Track listing ==
All music is composed by DJ Yella.

No.	Title	Length
1.	"Doors"	1:29
2.	"Glory"	4:49
3.	"Watch Out Black Folks"	3:10
4.	"Mockingbird"	4:32
5.	"For the Love of Money" (featuring Jewell Caples)	4:30
6.	"The "A"Train"	3:59
7.	"Soul Psychedelic Side"	2:55
8.	"When Your Back's Turned" (featuring Jewell Caples)	4:11
9.	"Mama Don't" (featuring Jimmy Z)	3:40
10.	"Brain Child"	2:58
11.	"Society's Relentless"	4:20
12.	"Daddy Rich"	4:24
13.	"Are U Xperienced?"	3:04
14.	"For the Love of Money" (Instrumental)	4:33
Total length:		52:37

Sample credits

- Track 3 contains elements from "Cramp Your Style" by All the People & Robert Moore (1972), "Movin'" by Brass Construction (1975), "Uphill Peace of Mind" by Kid Dynamite (1976), "Fantastic Freaks at the Dixie" by DJ Grand Wizard Theodore and The Fantastic Five (1983), "AJ Scratch" by Kurtis Blow (1984)
- Track 4 contains elements from "Funky Drummer" by James Brown (1970), "Different Strokes" by Syl Johnson (1967), "Kool Is Back" by Funk, Inc. (1971), "UFO" by ESG (1981), "Scratchin'" by The Magic Disco Machine (1975)
- Track 5 contains elements from "I've Been Watching You (Move Your Sexy Body)" by Parliament (1976)
- Track 7 contains elements from "EXP" by Jimi Hendrix (1967), "Jungle Boogie" by Kool & the Gang (1973)
- Track 8 contains elements from "Whatcha See Is Whatcha Get" by The Dramatics (1971)
- Track 9 contains elements from "God Make Me Funky" by The Headhunters & Pointer Sisters (1975), "Stone to the Bone" by James Brown (1973)
- Track 10 contains elements from "Hook and Sling - Part I" by Eddie Bo (1969), "Let a Woman Be a Woman, Let a Man Be a Man" by Dyke & the Blazers (1969), "Moog Power" by Hugo Montenegro (1969), "Bring the Noise" by Public Enemy (1987)
- Track 11 contains elements from "Different Strokes" by Syl Johnson (1967)
- Track 13 contains elements from "Good Times" by Chic (1979)

== Personnel ==
- Yomo Craig Smith – main artist/performer
- Mark Eric Green – main artist/performer
- Jewell Caples – backing vocals (tracks: 5, 8)
- James Zavala – saxophone (track 9)
- Nate Morgan – piano
- Mike "Crazy Neck" Sims – bass & guitar
- Antoine Carraby – producer
- Eric Wright – executive producer
- Donovan "The Dirt Biker" Sound – engineering
- Brian Knapp Gardner – mastering
- Bob Defrin – art direction
- Jodi Rovin – design
- Peter Dokus – photography
- Jerry Heller – management
