= Gen Fukunaga =

American engineer

- 福永 元
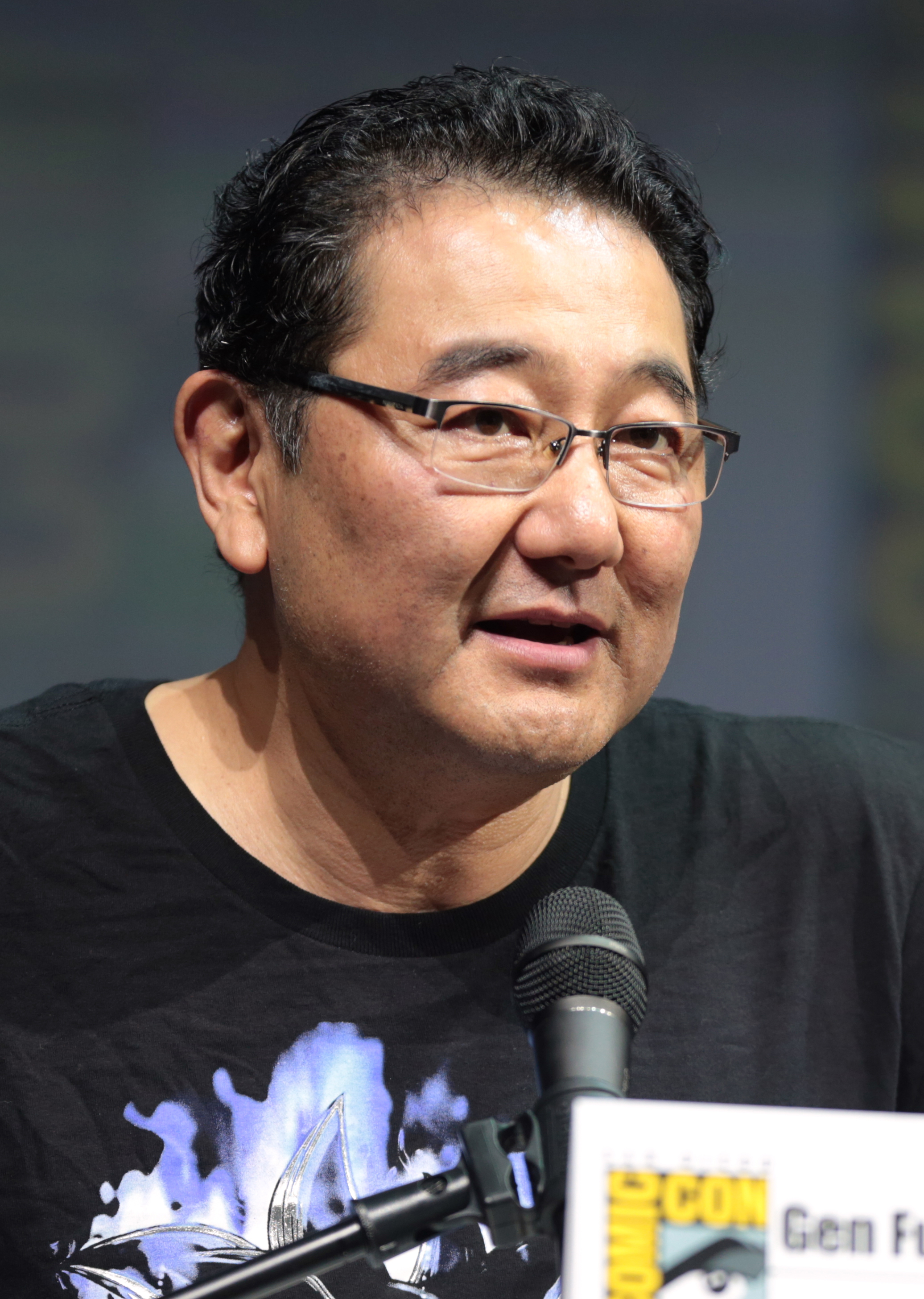
- Fukunaga in 2018
- Born: March 22, 1962 (age 64); Itami, Hyōgo, Japan
- Education: Purdue University (BSEE, MSEE); Columbia University (MBA)
- Occupations: Engineer; entrepreneur
- Years active: 1989–2019
- Spouse: Cindy Brennan
- Children: 3

Gen Fukunaga (福永 元, Fukunaga Gen; born March 22, 1962) is an American engineer and entrepreneur. He established Funimation (now Crunchyroll, LLC), a company that distributes anime in Canada and the United States. He was its president and chairman until he stepped down in 2019. As of October 2011, Fukunaga was chairman of online video game publisher GameSamba.

== Biography ==
Fukunaga was born in Itami, Hyōgo, Japan, and grew up in West Lafayette, Indiana in the United States. He graduated from West Lafayette High School in 1979.

Fukunaga attended Purdue University where he got his BSEE in 1982 and his MSEE in 1984. He later moved to Boca Raton, Florida to work as an engineer for IBM. He then attended Columbia Business School, obtaining an MBA in 1989. He held a position with Andersen Consulting (now Accenture) before getting a job with Tandem Computers in Sunnyvale, California.

Fukunaga is also the co-founder and manager of EchoLight Studios, a Texas-based Christian television production company run by Rick Santorum. EchoLight initially shared office space with Fukunaga's Funimation.

Originally, Toei Animation told Funimation that they could not have the Dragon Ball series. However, Fukunaga's uncle, Nagafumi Hori, was one of the producers for Toei Company and helped him convince Toei Animation to give the license to Funimation. So Fukunaga went to coworker Daniel Cocanougher, whose family owned a feed mill in Decatur, Texas, and convinced the Cocanougher family to sell their business and invest in creating a production company. With that, Funimation was established in 1994.

In 2005, Funimation was acquired by the Navarre Corporation for US$100.4 million,Fukunaga still remained the company's CEO. In 2011, the company was sold to a group of investors which included Fukunaga himself.

In 2017, Funimation was sold to Sony Pictures Television Networks for US$143 million, with Fukunaga retaining a 5% stake. In 2019, Fukunaga stepped down as general manager of Funimation. His remaining equity interest was repurchased by Sony Pictures when he left the firm.

In 2022, Funimation was consolidated into Crunchyroll LLC, named after a streaming service of the same name it was acquired by one year earlier, before Funimation's brand and services ultimately shut down in April 2024.

During an October 2023 seminar at Columbia Business School's Center on Japanese Economy and Business, Fukunaga was asked by an audience member why he chose to retire from Funimation. Fukunaga replied, "Honestly, after cashing out twice in the company, I really didn't need to work for a living anymore!"

== Personal life ==
Fukunaga is married to Cindy Brennan, who also was a co-founder and former executive producer at Funimation, and they have three children. He has one sister.
