= Dr. Dre Presents: The Aftermath =

1996 compilation album by Aftermath Entertainment

Dr. Dre Presents... The Aftermath

Compilation album by Aftermath Entertainment
- Released: November 26, 1996
- Recorded: 1996
- Genre: Hip hop; G-funk; R&B
- Length: 71:12
- Label: Aftermath; Interscope
- Producer: Dr. Dre (exec.); Bud'da

Singles from Dr. Dre Presents: The Aftermath
- 1. "East Coast/West Coast Killas" Released: August 13, 1996; 2. "Been There, Done That" Released: September 1, 1996

Dr. Dre Presents... The Aftermath is a compilation album by American West Coast rapper Dr. Dre. It was released on November 26, 1996, as the first release on Aftermath Entertainment. The album was largely produced by the label's production team: the Soul Kitchen, which consisted of Dr. Dre, Bud'da, Flossy P, Stu-B-Doo, and Chris "the Glove" Taylor.

== Background ==
Dre's scarce vocals, newly critiquing gangsta rap, marked Dre's reemergence after his departure from Death Row Records in March 1996, where Dre himself had propelled gangsta rap into the mainstream. Dre had co-founded Death Row Records in 1991 amid his embattled split from Ruthless Records and its pioneering gangsta rap group N.W.A.

The 1996 album's first single, "East Coast/West Coast Killas", features prominent rappers from California and New York rebuking rap's recently ugly East–West "war". Dre participates himself on the chorus and the music video features a cameo appearance by Southern rapper, Scarface. The second single, a Dre solo, is the only track with Dre as the main vocalist, "Been There, Done That".

== Critical reception ==
Professional ratings
Review scores
Source	Rating
AllMusic	2.5/5 stars
Entertainment Weekly	B+
Los Angeles Times	3.5/4 stars
Muzik	6/10
Rap Pages	(mixed)
Rolling Stone	2.5/5 stars
The Rolling Stone Album Guide	2/5 stars
USA Today	3.5/4 stars

A platinum seller, the album peaked at #6 on the Billboard 200 and at #3 on the Top R&B/Hip Hop-Albums charts. Nonetheless, quite unlike Dre's prior album—The Chronic, released in December 1992 as Dre's debut solo album and Death Row Records' first album—Dre's new offering, not a standout, received mixed reviews and mediocre appraisals.

The Glove, among the album's co-producers, reasoned, "People were upset because they wanted a 'Dr. Dre' album. They weren't looking for a compilation album. That's what messed that up. Plus the single 'Been There, Done That' was cool, but it was taking away from the gangster style that people wanted." Himself commenting on the album, Dre remarked, "It was just okay. That was a hit and miss." More broadly, Dre explained, "That point of my life, musically, it was just off balance. I was off track then and trying to find it. It was a period of doubt. . . It happens with artists. Everything isn't going to be out of the park."

== Track listing ==
No.	Title	Producer(s)	Length
1.	"Aftermath (The Intro)" (RC, Sharief and Sid McCoy)	Dr. Dre, Mel-Man	2:51
2.	"East Coast/West Coast Killas" (Group Therapy (RBX, KRS-One, B-Real and Nas))	Dr. Dre, Stu-B-Doo, Stocks McGuire	4:54
3.	"Shittin' on the World" (D-Ruff, Hands-On and Mel-Man)	Dr. Dre, Mel-Man	4:58
4.	"Blunt Time" (RBX, Dr. Dre and Roger Troutman)	Dr. Dre, Stu-B-Doo	4:22
5.	"Been There, Done That" (Dr. Dre)	Bud'da, Dr. Dre	5:10
6.	"Choices" (Kim Summerson)	Ewart A. Wilson Jr., Floyd Howard, Glen Mosley	4:45
7.	"As the World Keeps Turning" (Cassandra McCowan, Mike Lynn, Flossy P and Stu-B-Doo)	Flossy P, Chris "The Glove" Taylor	4:43
8.	"Got Me Open" (Hands-On, Dr. Dre)	Bud'da	4:19
9.	"Str-8 Gone" (King T)	Bud'da	4:33
10.	"Please" (Maurice Wilcher and Nicole Johnson)	Maurice Wilcher	4:22
11.	"Do 4 Love" (Jheryl Lockhart)	Bud'da	3:23
12.	"Sexy Dance" (Cassandra McCowan, Jheryl Lockhart and RC)	Bud'da, Dr. Dre	4:55
13.	"No Second Chance" (Who'z Who)	Rodney Duke, Rose Griffin	4:49
14.	"L.A.W. (Lyrical Assault Weapon)" (Sharief)	Stu-B-Doo	4:24
15.	"Nationowl" (Christian Nowlin)	Bud'da	4:06
16.	"Fame" (Jheryl Lockhart, King T and RC)	Dr. Dre, Chris "The Glove" Taylor	4:30

Sample credits

- "East Coast/West Coast Killas" | Quincy Jones - "Ironside"
- "Shittin' on the World" | The Fuzz - "I Love You for All Seasons"
- "Blunt Time" | Quincy Jones - "Summer in the City"
- "Choices" | Isaac Hayes - "Look of Love"
- "Got Me Open" | K-Def & Larry O - "Real Live Shit"
- "Do 4 Love" | Heath Brothers - "Smiling Billy Suite Pt. 2"
- "Fame" | David Bowie - "Fame"

== Charts ==
=== Weekly charts ===
Chart (1996–1997)	Peak position
Canadian Albums (RPM)	69
US Billboard 200	6
US Top R&B/Hip-Hop Albums (Billboard)	3

=== Year-end charts ===
Chart (1997)	Position
US Billboard 200	152
US Top R&B/Hip-Hop Albums (Billboard)	71

=== Singles ===
Year	Song	Chart positions	
Year	Song	Billboard Hot 100	Rhythmic Top 40
1996	"East Coast/West Coast Killas"	–	–
1996	"Been There, Done That"	–	40

== Certifications ==
Region	Certification	Certified units/sales
United States (RIAA)	Platinum	1,000,000^{^}
^{^} Shipments figures based on certification alone.
