= The World Is Mine (Ice Cube song) =

Single by Ice Cube

from the album Dangerous Ground (soundtrack)
- Released: January 13, 1997
- Recorded: 1996
- Studio: Westside Studios (California)
- Genre: Gangsta rap
- Length: 3:07
- Label: Jive
- Songwriter: O'Shea Jackson, Sr.
- Producer: Ice Cube

Ice Cube singles chronology
"Hand of the Dead Body" (1995)	"The World Is Mine" (1997)	"Men of Steel" (1997)

Music video
- "The World Is Mine" on YouTube

"The World Is Mine" is a song written, produced and performed by American recording artist Ice Cube. It was released as the first single from the soundtrack to the 1997 action thriller film Dangerous Ground. It was recorded at Ice Cube's home recording studio Westside Studios in California, and released on January 13, 1997, via Jive Records. Fellow rappers Mack 10 and K-Dee made cameo appearance on the track and in its music video. The single peaked at number 55 on the Hot R&B/Hip-Hop Songs and number 39 on the Hot Rap Songs. The song was later re-released on Ice Cube's compilation In the Movies.

== Track listing ==
12"
No.	Title	Writer(s)	Producer	Length
1.	"The World Is Mine" (LP Version) (featuring Mack 10 & K-Dee)	O. Jackson	Ice Cube	3:07
2.	"The World Is Mine" (Instrumental)	O. Jackson	Ice Cube	3:07
3.	"The World Is Mine" (Clean) (featuring Mack 10 & K-Dee)	O. Jackson	Ice Cube	3:07

CD single
No.	Title	Writer(s)	Producer	Length
1.	"The World Is Mine" (Radio Version)	O. Jackson	Ice Cube	3:13
2.	"The World Is Mine" (LP Version)	O. Jackson	Ice Cube	3:12
3.	"The World Is Mine" (Instrumental)	O. Jackson	Ice Cube	3:09
Total length:				9:34

== Personnel ==
- O'Shea "Ice Cube" Jackson – lead vocals, lyrics, producer
- Dedrick "Mack 10" Rolison – backing vocals
- Darrell "K-Dee" Johnson – backing vocals
- Brian "Big Bass" Gardner – mastering

== Charts ==
Chart (1997)	Peak position
US Hot R&B/Hip-Hop Songs (Billboard)	55
US Hot Rap Songs (Billboard)	39
