= Planet of da Apes =

Studio album by Da Lench Mob
- Released: November 1, 1994
- Recorded: 1993–1994
- Studio: QDIII Soundlab (Los Angeles, CA)
- Genres: Political rap; gangsta rap
- Length: 43:55
- Labels: Street Knowledge; Priority
- Producers: Ice Cube (also exec.); Mr. Woody; Dr. Jam; Madness 4 Real; Quincy Jones III; 88 X Unit; Da Lench Mob

Da Lench Mob chronology
Guerillas in tha Mist (1992)	Planet of da Apes (1994)

Singles from Planet of da Apes
- 1. "Chocolate City" Released: September 28, 1994; 2. "Goin' Bananas" Released: December 24, 1994

Planet of da Apes is the second and final studio album by American hip-hop group Da Lench Mob. The group's final album, it was released on November 1, 1994, via Street Knowledge/Priority Records. Its title is a reference to Planet of the Apes. The album was produced by Ice Cube, Mr. Woody, Dr. Jam, Madness 4 Real, Quincy Jones III, and 88 X Unit. It featured guest appearances from K-Dee, Mack 10, and Yo-Yo. The album peaked at number 81 on the Billboard 200.

== Production ==
J-Dee's vocals were erased from the album after he went to prison. Maulkie, of Yomo & Maulkie, was brought in as his replacement.

== Critical reception ==
Professional ratings
Review scores
Source	Rating
AllMusic	2.5/5 stars
The Encyclopedia of Popular Music	3/5 stars
Music Week	2/5 stars

Trouser Press wrote that the album "is no match for its predecessor’s focused fury."

== Track listing ==
No.	Title	Producer(s)	Length
1.	"Scared Lil' Nigga" (Insert)	Ice Cube	0:49
2.	"Chocolate City"	Mr. Woody	3:43
3.	"Cut Throats" (featuring Mack 10)	Ice Cube	4:31
4.	"King of the Jungle"	Madness 4 Real	3:51
5.	"Who Is It?" (Insert)	Ice Cube	0:38
6.	"Planet of da Apes"	Dr. Jam	4:50
7.	"Goin' Bananas"	Dr. Jam; Madness 4 Real	3:31
8.	"Mellow Madness" (featuring K-Dee)	Ice Cube	5:59
9.	"Environmental Terrorist" (featuring Yo-Yo)	Quincy Jones III	4:16
10.	"Set the Shit Straight"	Ice Cube	4:20
11.	"Trapped"	88 X Unit; T-Bone (add.)	3:37
12.	"Final Call"	Mr. Woody	3:50
Total length:			43:55

Sample credits

- Track 3 contains elements from "Slow Down" by Brand Nubian (1990)
- Track 4 contains elements from "Hit It Run" by Run-DMC (1986), "Get Up Offa That Thing" by James Brown (1976), "Mean Old Lady" by King Biscuit Boy (1974)
- Track 7 contains elements from "Guerillas in tha Mist" by Da Lench Mob (1992) and "911 Is a Joke" by Public Enemy (1990)
- Track 8 contains elements from "Hollywood Squares" by Bootsy's Rubber Band (1978) and "Doo Wa Ditty (Blow That Thing)" by Zapp (1982)
- Track 9 contains elements from "Guerillas in tha Mist" by Da Lench Mob (1992)
- Track 10 contains elements from "Kool Is Back" by Funk, Inc. (1971)

== Personnel ==
- Terry "T-Bone" Gray – vocals, co-producer
- Jerome "Shorty" Muhammad – vocals
- Mark Eric "Maulkie" Green – vocals
- O'Shea Jackson – vocals (tracks: 3, 8), producer (tracks: 1, 3, 5, 8, 10), executive producer
- Dedrick D'Mon Rolison – vocals (track 3)
- Darrel Johnson – vocals (track 8)
- Yolanda Whitaker – vocals (track 9)
- Henrik Milling – vocals (track 6), producer (tracks: 6, 7)
- Quincy Jones III – keyboards & producer (track 9)
- Michael Keith Simmons – guitar (track 2), producer (track 11)
- Victor Nathan Taylor – guitar (track 2), producer (track 11)
- Darryl "D Funk" Fisher – keyboards (track 2), piano (track 12)
- Mike "Crazy Neck" Sims – bass & guitar (track 6)
- Bootsy Collins – bass (track 8)
- Gary James – guitar (tracks: 8, 12), keyboards (track 8)
- Stan “The Guitar Man” Jones – guitar (track 9)
- Clint "Payback" Sands – guitar (track 10)
- DJ Inz – scratches (track 7)
- Keston E. Wright – engineering & mixing
- Rob Chiarelli – engineering & mixing
- Joseph L. Steiner III – mastering
- Jamie Seyberth – mixing
- Charlie Essers – mixing
- Kevin Wright – mixing
