= Pressha =

American R&B singer

- Born: David Jones; Aiken, South Carolina
- Origin: United States
- Genres: R&B
- Years active: 1992–1998
- Label: LaFace (1997 - 1998)
- Website: Official Facebook

Pressha (born David Jones) is an American R&B singer.

His debut single was the 1995 single "Put Ya Thang Down"; then, as a member of the Southsyde B.O.I.Z., he released "Get Ready, Here It Comes (Choo Choo)". His only album was a 1998 effort released on LaFace Records, which spawned the U.S. Billboard Hot 100 top forty hit, "Splackavellie".

Currently, Pressha is a Southern Soul blues artist, performing under the name "Mr. David". He is signed to Malaco Records.

== Discography ==
=== Album ===
- Don't Get It Twisted (LaFace Records, 1998) US R&B #98

=== Singles ===
- "Put Ya Thang Down" (1995)
- "Get Ready, Here it Comes (Choo Choo)" (1995) (with the Southsyde B.O.I.Z.)
- "Do Boy" (1998)
- "Splackavellie" (1998) #27 U.S., #14 U.S. R&B
