= LaFace Records =

Record label

LaFace Records LLC
- Parent company: Sony Music Entertainment
- Founded: 1989
- Founder: Antonio "L.A." Reid; Kenneth "Babyface" Edmonds
- Defunct: 2011
- Status: Inactive (absorbed into RCA Records)
- Distributors: Arista (1989–2001); Jive (2004–2011); Legacy (2011–present)
- Genre: R&B, pop, hip-hop, soul
- Country of origin: United States
- Location: Atlanta, Georgia

LaFace Records was an American record label based in Atlanta, Georgia, that operated as a unit of Sony Music Entertainment from 2008 to 2011 and was historically a part of Bertelsmann Music Group from 1989 to 2004. It was most active and achieved its greatest commercial success during the 1990s, dealing largely in the field of urban music. It was originally distributed by its co-creator Arista Records from 1989 through 2001, after which it was shuttered and absorbed into Arista. In 2004, the label was rebooted, and it began operating through Jive Records until both were absorbed into RCA Records in 2011. Today, the label's back catalog and reissues are managed by Legacy Recordings.

== Company history ==
LaFace was formed in 1989 as a joint venture between the producing duo Antonio "L.A." Reid and Kenneth "Babyface" Edmonds, and Arista Records. The combined nicknames of the duo's successful production company inspired the name of the label. LaFace went on to become a successful label throughout the 1990s, responsible for launching the recording careers of such popular acts as: TLC, Toni Braxton, Outkast, Pink, Usher, Goodie Mob and Donell Jones. Towards the end of the decade, LaFace produced fewer artists, while Babyface began to focus more on his own music career. The label was acquired completely by Arista and BMG in 1999. In 2001, L.A. Reid was appointed Chairman/CEO of Arista. As a result of Reid's promotion, LaFace was dissolved as most of its prominent acts moved up to the main Arista label to continue to work under Reid.

In 1992, LaFace signed Georgia duo Outkast. After receiving a $15,000 advance from LaFace in 1993, Outkast started recording the album, which was executive produced by L.A. Reid and Babyface. Outkast's first album, Southernplayalisticadillacmuzik, was released April 26, 1994 and entered the top 20 on the Billboard top 200. The album went on to achieve Platinum status in America.

In 2004, after the corporate restructuring of the BMG labels, LaFace was reactivated as one-quarter of the newly reconstructed Zomba Music Group during the Sony BMG joint venture at the time. Most of its former roster, who had moved on to Arista, returned to the company upon its reactivation. In 2011, LaFace (along with its previous Jive/Zomba distributor) was again shuttered, this time being absorbed into RCA Records.

== Former artists ==
The following is a list of artists who have recorded for LaFace Records.

- 1 Life 2 Live
- Az Yet
- Big Gipp
- B-Rock & The Bizz
- Toni Braxton
- Ciara
- Damian Dame
- Corey Glover
- Goodie Mob
- Jermaine Jackson
- Donell Jones
- Kenny Lattimore & Chante Moore
- Outkast
- Pink
- Pressha
- Tony Rich
- Sam Salter
- Shanice
- Society of Soul
- TLC
- T.I.
- Usher
- YoungBloodZ

== In-house producers ==
- L.A. Reid
- Babyface
- Daryl Simmons
- Kayo
- Dallas Austin
- Organized Noize
- Tim Thomas & Ted Bishop

== See also ==
- List of record labels
- Rosa Parks v. LaFace Records
