= Man Down (album) =

Studio album by Ice Cube
- Released: November 22, 2024
- Genres: West Coast hip-hop; gangsta rap
- Length: 61:24
- Label: Lench Mob
- Producers: The Almighty E-A-Ski; David Banner; BiggVon; E. Brown; Cassius Jay; Davon; Decadez; Hallway Productionz; Ice Cube; Jonathan; Nottz; Policy Kings; Samuel Ellliott (The IIIrd); T-Mix; Young Slade; Zaytoven

Ice Cube chronology
| Snoop Cube 40 $hort (2022) | Man Down (2024) | Man Up (2025) |

Singles from Man Down
- 1. "It's My Ego" Released: October 18, 2024; 2. "Ego Maniacs" Released: November 8, 2024; 3. "So Sensitive" Released: November 15, 2024; 4. "Rolling at Twilight" Released: January 22, 2025; 5. "She's Sanctified" Released: April 19, 2025

Professional ratings
Review scores
| Source | Rating |
|---|---|
| AllMusic | 3.5/5 stars |

Man Down is the eleventh solo studio album by American rapper Ice Cube. It was released on November 22, 2024, via Lench Mob Records. Production was handled by T-Mix, David Banner, The Almighty E-A-Ski, Hallway Productionz, Lil' Jon, Nottz, Zaytoven, and Ice Cube himself, among others. It features guest appearances from B-Real, E-40, IshaDon, J-Dee, K-Major, Kurupt, Mike Epps, October London, Snoop Dogg, Too Short, and Xzibit.

In the United States, the album debuted at number 48 on the Billboard 200, number 12 on the Top R&B/Hip-Hop Albums, number 8 on both the Top Rap Albums and Independent Albums charts. It also debuted at number 21 on the UK Hip Hop and R&B Albums Chart.

The album was preceded by three singles: "It's My Ego", "Ego Maniacs", and "So Sensitive"

== Background and cover ==
Man Down was Ice Cube's first solo studio album in nearly 6 years after Everythang's Corrupt.

The album cover for "Man Down" shows a black teenager in Los Angeles walking on a sidewalk while looking to his left at a dead body. On the road, a construction worker, police officer, and pedestrian are all dead while lying down.

== Promotion and release ==
On October 18, Ice Cube released "It's My Ego," a single for the album. The single was teased a few weeks before release on September 23. On November 11, Ice Cube released his other single "Ego Maniacs," which featured Busta Rhymes and Killer Mike.

On November 11, Ice Cube announced the album's release date alongside its album cover. A day later, he performed his single "It's My Ego" live in Phoenix, Arizona.

== Commercial performance ==
Man Down debuted at number 48 on the Billboard 200 and number 12 the Top R&B/Hip-Hop Albums, with 20,000 equivalent album units and 5,000 of those units deriving from streaming sectors.

== Critical reception ==
AllMusic's review described the album as a "nostalgic ride through familiar but welcome sounds, lyrical themes, and the unfiltered gangster personality Cube's been giving us since the dawn of gangsta rap."

== Track listing ==
| No. | Title | Lyrics | Music | Producer(s) | Length |
|---|---|---|---|---|---|
| 1. | "Rollin' at Twilight" | O'Shea Jackson; Joshua Cross | Cassius Jay; Elon Deondre Brown | Jay; E. Brown | 2:57 |
| 2. | "It's My Ego" | Jackson | Jackson; Shon Adams | The Almighty E-A-Ski | 3:46 |
| 3. | "So Sensitive" | Jackson; Tristan Jones | Jackson | T-Mix | 2:48 |
| 4. | "She's Sanctified" (performed by Mount Westmore and October London) | Jackson; Calvin Broadus; Earl Stevens; Todd Shaw; Jared Erskine; Jones; Marvin Gaye; Gordon Banks | Jackson | T-Mix | 4:17 |
| 5. | "Not Like Them" | Jackson; Dominick Lamb; Lawrence Black; Kevin Kendrick | Jackson | Nottz | 3:40 |
| 6. | "5150" | Jackson; Davon Phillips | Phillips | Davon; BiggVon | 3:45 |
| 7. | "No Cap" (featuring K-Major, IshaDon, and Mike Epps) | Jackson; Kendricke Brown; Isha Murray; Mike Epps; Xavier Dotson | K. Brown | Zaytoven | 2:52 |
| 8. | "3 Lil Piggies" | Jackson; Henry Williamson | Williamson | Policy Kings | 1:53 |
| 9. | "Ghetto Story" | Jackson; Jones | Jones | T-Mix | 3:08 |
| 10. | "Facts" (featuring J-Dee) | Jackson; Desean Cooper; Arcale Turner | Cooper | Decadez | 2:40 |
| 11. | "Fighting for My Life in Paradise" (featuring Kurupt) | Jackson; Ricardo Brown; Angela Winbush | Winbush | David Banner | 2:58 |
| 12. | "Let's Get Money Together" (featuring B-Real) | Jackson; Louis Freese; Turner | Turner | Decadez | 3:00 |
| 13. | "I'mma Burn Rubber" | Jackson; Turner | Turner | Decadez | 3:23 |
| 14. | "Especially You" | Jackson; Gerald C. Collins Jr. | Jackson; Collins | Ice Cube | 3:31 |
| 15. | "Break the Mirror" (featuring Xzibit) | Jackson; Alvin Joiner; Samuel Elliott III | Phillips; Elliott III | Davon; Samuel | 3:06 |
| 16. | "Talkin' Bout These Rappers" | Jackson; Jonathan Smith | Smith | Jonathan; Young Slade | 4:03 |
| 17. | "Scary Movie" | Jackson | Teak Underdue | Hallway Productionz | 2:50 |
| 18. | "Take Me to Your Leader" | Jackson; David Banner | Banner | Banner | 3:09 |
| 19. | "Ego Maniacs" (featuring Killer Mike and Busta Rhymes) | Jackson; Michael Render; Trevor G. Smith Jr. | Jackson; Render; Smith; Adams | The Almighty E-A-Ski | 3:38 |
| Total length: | | | | | 61:24 |

== Personnel ==
- Ice Cube – vocals (all tracks), mixing (tracks 1, 3–18)
- Gavin Finn – mixing (tracks 1, 3–5, 7–18), engineering (all tracks)
- The Almighty E-A-Ski – mixing (tracks 2, 19), engineering (2)
- David Lopez – mixing (track 6)
- Hellfire – mixing (track 19)
- Ekzakt – engineering (track 4)
- Emari Stevens – engineering (track 4)
- Frank Vasquez – engineering (track 4)
- Andrey Paschenoko – engineering (tracks 10–13)
- Kyle Oueis – engineering (tracks 11, 18)
- Young Slade – engineering (track 16)

== Charts ==
| Chart (2024) | Peak position |
|---|---|
| UK R&B Albums (Official Charts) | 21 |
| US Billboard 200 | 48 |
| US Top R&B/Hip-Hop Albums (Billboard) | 12 |
| US Top Rap Albums (Billboard) | 8 |
| US Independent Albums (Billboard) | 8 |
