= Kausion =

American hip hop trio

- Origin: Los Angeles, California, U.S.
- Genres: West Coast hip hop, Gangsta rap
- Years active: 1995–1997; 2020 (1–time reunited)
- Labels: Lench Mob; Navarre
- Past members: Cel; Gonzoe; Kaydo

Kausion was an American rap group composed of Cel, Gonzoe, and Kaydo that was signed to Ice Cube's Lench Mob Records in 1995. They released their debut album, South Central Los Skanless, on October 10, 1995. The album peaked at number 37 on the Billboard Top R&B/Hip-Hop Albums and at number 23 on the Billboard Top Heatseekers. The group disbanded in 1996, with their final appearances being a collaboration with fellow Los Angeles–based rap group, Tha Dogg Pound on the song, "I'll Do It" from the Supercop soundtrack and the song, "Lil' Sumpin'" from The Lawhouse Experience, Volume One, in 1997. Kausion's second album, Youth-Anasia, was released on February 4, 2020, via Blokkwise Entertainment.

Gonzoe died in July 30, 2021, after he was shot in Seattle.

== Discography ==
=== Studio albums ===
Title	Album details	Peak chart positions		
Title	Album details	US	US R&B	US Rap
South Central Los Skanless	Released: October 10, 1995; Label: Lench Mob, Navarre; Format: CD, LP, cassette	—	37	—
Youth-Anasia	Released: February 4, 2020; Label: Blocwize Entertainment; Format: CD, streaming	—	—	—

=== Extended plays ===
Title	EP details
Masters Massacre	Released: January 15, 2021; Label: Blocwize, Rapbay; Format: Digital download
