= Yomo & Maulkie =

American hip hop group

- Origin: Los Angeles, California, U.S.
- Genres: Hip hop
- Years active: 1989–1992
- Labels: Ruthless
- Past members: Yomo Smith; Mark Eric Green

Yomo & Maulkie were an American hardcore hip hop duo from Los Angeles, California, composed of rappers Yomo (born Yomo Smith) and Maulkie (born Mark Eric Green). They were signed with Ruthless Records, the label owned by Eazy-E. Their discography consists of one studio album, which spawned three singles.

The duo first worked with Eazy-E in 1989 when they provided additional vocals to The D.O.C.'s debut album No One Can Do It Better. They were associated with the members of N.W.A., although the duo was not a gangsta group. Instead, its lyrics hewed more toward Public Enemy's political style. In 1991, Eazy worked with them again as executive producer for their only full-length album Are U Xperienced?, which was distributed by Atco/Atlantic Records. The album's name is derived from Jimi Hendrix's 1967 album Are You Experienced?. The group found little commercial success with their single "Glory" from the album, which peaked at number 7 on the Hot Rap Songs. The song "For the Love of Money" off of the album was reused on the Bone Thugs-n-Harmony single "Foe tha Love of $" from the 1994 album Creepin on ah Come Up. Maulkie later joined Ice Cube's protégé group Da Lench Mob on their sophomore effort Planet of da Apes.

== Discography ==
Studio album

- 1991: Are U Xperienced?

Singles

- "Mama Don't" (1991)
- "Mockingbird" (1991)
- "Glory" / "Are U Xperienced" (1991)
