= We Be Clubbin' =

1997 single by Ice Cube

Single by Ice Cube

from the album The Players Club: Music From and Inspired by the Motion Picture
- Released: December 18, 1997
- Recorded: 1997
- Genre: Hip hop
- Length: 4:48
- Label: Heavyweight; A&M
- Songwriters: O'Shea "Ice Cube" Jackson; Rodolfo "Clark Kent" Franklin; Earl "DMX" Simmons
- Producers: Rick "Dutch" Cousin; DJ Clark Kent

Ice Cube singles chronology
"Men of Steel" (1997)	"We Be Clubbin'" (1997)	"Pushin' Weight" (1998)

Music video
- "We Be Clubbin'" on YouTube

"We Be Clubbin'" is the first single from Ice Cube's soundtrack, The Players Club. The single was minor success, only making it to No. 32 on the Rhythmic Top 40 single chart. Several remixes were made, all featuring DMX and DJ Clark Kent—two Clark World remixes, one with DMX and Sonja Blade and one without Blade, and the Eye of the Tiger remix which sampled Survivor's "Eye of the Tiger". At the end of the song, Ice Cube shouts out his homeboys, homegirls and the club workers. He then shouts out cities to "show him love in the club": Los Angeles, San Francisco Bay Area, Chicago, St. Louis, Miami, New York City, Detroit, Houston, Kansas City, Denver, Washington, D.C. (explicit version only), Atlanta, Memphis, Dallas, and New Orleans (clean version only).

== Music video ==
The video shows Ice Cube riding on a makeshift rocket traveling to clubs in big cities and interacting with all the patrons and employees of the clubs.

== "We Be Ballin'" ==
"We Be Ballin'"

Song by Ice Cube featuring Michael Jackson and Shaquille O'Neal
- Released: Unreleased
- Genre: Hip hop; R&B
- Songwriters: O'Shea "Ice Cube" Jackson; Rodolfo "Clark Kent" Franklin; Earl "DMX" Simmons
- Producers: Rick "Dutch" Cousin; DJ Clark Kent

In 1998, a remix titled "We Be Ballin'" was produced, featuring Shaquille O'Neal (spoken intro + verses) and Michael Jackson (on chorus). This remix was to be released on an NBA compilation album scheduled for the end of 1998 and was also going to be featured in NBA commercials. Jackson was brought on this project by O'Neal who had previously performed on the track "2 Bad" on Jackson's album HIStory: Past, Present and Future, Book I (1995). The entire project was finally shelved due to the player-initiated strike against the league that year. Unlike "We Be Clubbin'", the song features no vulgar language. The song was leaked online.

=== Versions ===
- Master mix – 4:46
- Master mix (w/ fade out) – 5:08
- Street mix – 5:12
- Work in Progress – 5:28

== Track listing ==
Vinyl single 1
No.	Title	Length
1.	"We Be Clubbin'" (LP version)	4:48
2.	"We Be Clubbin'" (instrumental)	4:45
3.	"We Be Clubbin'" (clean radio edit)	4:03
4.	"We Be Clubbin'" (clean a cappella)	4:49
Total length:		18:25

CD single
No.	Title	Length
1.	"We Be Clubbin'" (clean radio edit)	3:54
2.	"We Be Clubbin'" (clean LP version)	4:48
3.	"We Be Clubbin'" (instrumental)	4:05
4.	"We Be Clubbin'" (a cappella)	4:49
Total length:		17:36

Vinyl single 2
No.	Title	Length
1.	"We Be Clubbin'" (Clark World remix)	4:24
2.	"We Be Clubbin'" (Clark World remix instrumental)	4:16
3.	"We Be Clubbin'" (Clark World remix—clean radio edit)	4:05
4.	"We Be Clubbin'" (Clark World radio remix)	3:46
5.	"We Be Clubbin'" (Clark World remix acapella)	3:46
Total length:		20:17

== Charts ==
Chart (1998)	Peak position
US Rhythmic Airplay (Billboard)	32
