= Lench Mob Records =

Record Label

- Parent company: Universal Music Group
- Founded: 1992
- Founder: Ice Cube
- Distributors: Caroline; Capitol; Interscope; Priority; Hitmaker Distribution 10K Projects
- Genre: Hip-hop; R&B
- Country of origin: United States
- Location: South Central Los Angeles, California, U.S.

Lench Mob Records is a record label owned by Los Angeles rapper and actor Ice Cube. Founded as Street Knowledge Records, it was once home to many of Cube's former allies such as DJ Pooh, and Lench Mob's own Chilly Chill, Del the Funky Homosapien, Kam, Yo-Yo and the group Da Lench Mob. The label, established in 1992, remained dormant for a long period until a revival in 2006 with the release of Ice Cube's album Laugh Now, Cry Later. Lench Mob Records also distributes Bigg Swang Records home to WC, DJ Crazy Toones, Young Maylay and Tha Trapp. Hallway Productionz have produced multiple tracks for the label's two major artists.

== Releases ==
Artist	Title	Year of Release
Da Lench Mob	Guerillas in tha Mist	1992
Kam	Neva Again	1993
K-Dee	Ass, Gas, or Cash (No One Rides for Free)	1994
Da Lench Mob	Planet of da Apes	1994
Kausion	South Central Los Skanless	1995
Westside Connection	Bow Down	1996
Ice Cube	War & Peace Vol. 1 (The War Disc)	1998
Ice Cube	War & Peace Vol. 2 (The Peace Disc)	2000
Ice Cube	Laugh Now, Cry Later	2006
WC	Guilty by Affiliation	2007
Ice Cube	Raw Footage	2008
Ice Cube	I Am The West	2010
WC	Revenge of the Barracuda	2011
OMG	Jackin' For Beats	2012
Ice Cube	Everythang's Corrupt	2018
Ice Cube	Man Down	2024

== Current artists ==
Artist	Signed in	Albums released by Lench Mob	Additional information
Ice Cube	Founder	9	Label founder and its first major artist.
WC	2006	3	Label's second major artist. He has been affiliated with Ice Cube since 1991. WC also founded Bigg Swang Records, a division of Lench Mob Records.
Hallway Productionz	2005	none	Label production duo.
Tha Trapp	2007	none	New West Coast rap duo signed by WC.
Young Maylay	2008	none	After the collaboration with DJ Crazy Toones and WC in The Real Coast Guard, Young Maylay was invited to join the label.
Doughboy	2008	none	Up-and-coming artist who is also Cube's 2nd son. He first collaborated with Ice Cube on his album Raw Footage and also appeared on Cube's album I Am the West.
OMG	2008	1	Up-and-coming artist who is also Cube's oldest son. Collaborated with Ice Cube on the album I am the West. He played his father in the Straight Outta Compton film.

== Former artists ==
- DJ Pooh
- DJ Crazy Toones †
- Chilly Chill
- Threi
- Kausion
- Kam
- Yo Yo
- Del tha Funkee Homosapien
- Sir Jinx
- Mack 10
- Maulkie
- Shorty
- J Dee
- T-Bone
- K-Dee
- Dazzie Dee
- Renegadde
- Da Lench Mob
- Don Jagwarr
- Westside Connection
