= Navarre Corporation =

American publishing company

- Type: Private
- Industry: Music and film distribution and publishing
- Founded: 1983; 43 years ago
- Founder: Eric H. Paulson
- Defunct: 2013; 13 years ago
- Fate: Shut down: Assets acquired by WYNIT Distribution LLC. Relaunched as Navarre Distribution in 2016
- Headquarters: Greenville, SC, New York, NY, United States
- Owner: Geof Lewis and Peter Richichi
- Number of employees: 648
- Divisions: Navarre Distribution; Funimation (2005–2011)

Navarre Corporation was an American public distribution and publishing company founded in 1983 by Eric H. Paulson. The company was headquartered in New Hope, Minnesota. Navarre owned three subsidiary companies: a software publisher, Encore, Inc.; a distributor, Navarre Entertainment Media; and a Japanese anime distributor, Funimation, which was acquired in 2005 and divested in 2011 to founder Gen Fukunaga.

The company also offered niche films through BCI Home Entertainment a.k.a. BCI Eclipse Company (formerly Brentwood), but this division was closed in a 2013 re-structuring due to the recession, after two years of being unprofitable.

== History ==
The company was founded in 1983 by Eric Paulson.

On November 21, 1989, Lieberman Enterprises (a subsidiary of LIVE Entertainment) announced that it would acquire Navarre for an undisclosed price. The sale was completed on January 22, 1990, merging Navarre's computer products division into Lieberman.

In 1991, the company was reacquired by Paulson and spun-off from Lieberman after Troy, Michigan–based Handleman Company acquired the company for $100 million.

In 1993, Navarre Corporation started manufacturing software products, made its initial public offering (IPO) and becoming a publicly traded company.

In June 1994, Navarre and Digital Café announced the formation of Digital Entertainment, a company that develops CD-ROMs.

In 1996, Navarre acquired a 50% stake in Net Radio, a company that produces radio programming for the Internet.

In September 1996, Navarre invested in Velvel Records, a record label owned by former CBS Records chief executive officer Walter Yetnikoff.

In August 2002, Navarre acquired Encore, a company that develops and publishes computer software.

On November 5, 2003, Navarre announced that it would acquire BCI Eclipse (formerly known as Brentwood Communications), a home video distributor for $15 million and BCI Eclipse later ceased its operations on December 17, 2008.

In June 2005, Navarre had signed a video distribution deal with the professional wrestling promotion Total Nonstop Action Wrestling (TNA) to distribute and sell home video releases of various compilations, pay-per-view events, and documentaries in the United States and Canada. Navarre released TNA's monthly PPV events and various compilations to major retailers.

In June 2005, Navarre determined that its financial statements for 2004, and the first and third quarter of 2005, should be restated, because expenses related to the incentive-based deferred compensation of the company's CEO was recorded in the wrong quarter. In 2016, Navarre Distribution relaunched to provide audio and film distribution to labels and artist globally.

=== Acquisition and sale of Funimation ===
On January 11, 2005, Navarre announced that it would acquire Funimation Productions, an anime licensing company. The sale was completed on May 11, 2005. After the sale, Funimation Productions changed its name to Funimation Entertainment. Then, in April 2011, Navarre sold Funimation to a group of investors including Funimation co-founder Gen Fukunaga.

=== Speed Commerce and aftermath ===
On September 28, 2008, Dallas-based SpeedFC agreed to merge with Navarre for $50 million in cash and stock. The merger closed in 2013; the company changed their name from Navarre Corporation to Speed Commerce afterward.

On July 9, 2014, Syracuse, NY–based Wynit Distribution LLC acquired the majority of the assets of Navarre Distribution Services and Encore from Speed Commerce. Since then, the Navarre name has been retired.
