= DJ Pooh production discography =

List of songs produced by DJ Pooh

This is a list of songs produced by DJ Pooh.

== 1980s ==
Year	Album	Singer	Title	Ref
1984	12"	Uncle Jamm's Army	"Dial-A-Freak"	
1987	Bigger and Deffer	L.L. Cool J	"The Bristol Hotel"	
1987	Bigger and Deffer	L.L. Cool J	".357 - Break It on Down"	
1987	Bigger and Deffer	L.L. Cool J	"I Need Love"	
1987	12"	M.C. Bobby Jimmy	"Lots of Children"	
1987	Street Sounds Hip Hop 17	King Tee, Mixmaster Spade	"Ya Better Bring a Gun	
1988	Act a Fool	King Tee	"Act a Fool"	
1988	Act a Fool	King Tee	"Ko Rock Stuff"	
1988	Act a Fool	King Tee	"The Coolest"	
1988	Act a Fool	King Tee	"Flirt"	
1988	Act a Fool	King Tee	"Bass (Remix)"	
1988	Act a Fool	King Tee	"Let's Dance"	
1988	Act a Fool	King Tee	"Guitar Playin'"	
1988	Act a Fool	King Tee	"Payback's a Mutha"	
1988	Act a Fool	King Tee	"Just Clowning" (feat Breeze, Mixmaster Spade)	
1988	12"	Mixmaster Spade and Compton Posse	"Genius Is Back"	
1989	The Young Son of No One	Breeze	"Goin' Through a Phase"	
1989	12"	Greg Mack	"What Does It All Mean"	
	12"	Antoinette	"Who's the Boss (Remix)"	

== 1990s ==
Year	Album	Singer	Title	Ref
1990	At Your Own Risk	King Tee	"At Your Own Risk"	
1990	At Your Own Risk	King Tee	"Ruff Rhyme (Back Again)"	
1990	At Your Own Risk	King Tee	"On the Dance Tip"	
1990	At Your Own Risk	King Tee	"Jay Fay Dray"	
1990	At Your Own Risk	King Tee	"Skanless"	
1990	At Your Own Risk	King Tee	"Take You Home"	
1990	At Your Own Risk	King Tee	"Time to Get Out"	
1990	At Your Own Risk	King Tee	"Can This Be Real (Remix)"	
1990	At Your Own Risk	King Tee	"E Get Swift"	
1990	At Your Own Risk	King Tee	"Do Your Thing"	
1990	At Your Own Risk	King Tee	"King Tee Production"	
1990	At Your Own Risk	King Tee	"Played Like a Piano" (feat. Ice Cube, Breeze)	
1990	Hip-Hop Prankster	Bobby Jimmy & the Critters	"Jock Itchin'"	
1990	Hip-Hop Prankster	Bobby Jimmy & the Critters	"Somebody Farted"	
1990	Hip-Hop Prankster	Bobby Jimmy & the Critters	"Hair or Weave"	
1990	Short Dog's in the House	Too $hort	"Paula & Janet"	
1990	12"	MC Trouble	"Gotta Get a Grip (Come Ekwipped Mix)"	
1991	12"	Ultramagnetic MCs	"Poppa Large (West Coast Mix)"	
1991	12"	D-Nice	"The TR-808 Is Coming (Remix)"	
1991	Boyz n the Hood (soundtrack)	Yo-Yo	"Mama Don't Take No Mess"	
1991	Boyz n the Hood (soundtrack)	Kam	"Every Single Weekend"	
1991	Death Certificate	Ice Cube	"Bird in the Hand"	
1991	Death Certificate	Ice Cube	"Steady Mobbin'"	
1991	Death Certificate	Ice Cube	"No Vaseline"	
1991	I Wish My Brother George Was Here	Del tha Funkee Homosapien	"What Is a Booty"	
1991	I Wish My Brother George Was Here	Del tha Funkee Homosapien	"Mistadobalina"	
1991	I Wish My Brother George Was Here	Del tha Funkee Homosapien	"The Wacky World of Rapid Transit"	
1991	I Wish My Brother George Was Here	Del tha Funkee Homosapien	"Pissin' on Your Steps"	
1991	I Wish My Brother George Was Here	Del tha Funkee Homosapien	"Dark Skin Girls"	
1991	I Wish My Brother George Was Here	Del tha Funkee Homosapien	"Money for Sex"	
1991	I Wish My Brother George Was Here	Del tha Funkee Homosapien	"Ahonetwo, Ahonetwo"	
1991	I Wish My Brother George Was Here	Del tha Funkee Homosapien	"Prelude"	
1991	I Wish My Brother George Was Here	Del tha Funkee Homosapien	"Dr. Bombay"	
1991	I Wish My Brother George Was Here	Del tha Funkee Homosapien	"Sunny Meadowz"	
1991	I Wish My Brother George Was Here	Del tha Funkee Homosapien	"Sleepin' on My Couch"	
1991	I Wish My Brother George Was Here	Del tha Funkee Homosapien	"Hoodz Come in Dozens"	
1991	I Wish My Brother George Was Here	Del tha Funkee Homosapien	"Same Ol' Thing"	
1991	I Wish My Brother George Was Here	Del tha Funkee Homosapien	"Ya Lil' Crumbsnatchers"	
1992	12"	V.A.	"Get the Fist"	
1992	The Predator	Ice Cube	"When Will They Shoot?"	
1992	The Predator	Ice Cube	"The Predator"	
1992	The Predator	Ice Cube	"It Was a Good Day"	
1992	The Predator	Ice Cube	"Don't Trust 'Em"	
1992	The Predator	Ice Cube	"Check Yo Self" (feat. Das EFX)	
1992	Black Pearl	Yo-Yo	"Home Girl Don't Play Dat"	
1992	Black Pearl	Yo-Yo	"So Funky"	
1992	Black Pearl	Yo-Yo	"Woman to Woman"	
1992	Black Pearl	Yo-Yo	"Hoes" (featuring Deadly Threat)	
1992	Black Pearl	Yo-Yo	"A Few Good Men"	
1993	Sickinnahead	Deadly Threat	"Sucka Free"	
1993	Sickinnahead	Deadly Threat	"4-Deep"	
1993	Sickinnahead	Deadly Threat	"Let the Dogs Loose"	
1993	Sickinnahead	Deadly Threat	"Get Ghost"	
1993	Sickinnahead	Deadly Threat	"The Whore Said It's Yours"	
1993	Sickinnahead	Deadly Threat	"Bust One Fa Me"	
1993	Tha Triflin' Album	King Tee	"Drunk Tekneek"	
1993	Tha Triflin' Album	King Tee	"I Gotta Call Earl"	
1993	Tha Triflin' Album	King Tee	"Got It Bad Y'All" (feat. Tha Alkaholiks)	
1993	Tha Triflin' Album	King Tee	"King Tee's Beer Stand" (feat. Ice Cube)	
1993	Tha Triflin' Album	King Tee	"Where's a Hoe Sat"	
1993	Tha Triflin' Album	King Tee	"A Hoe B-4 tha Homie" (feat. Ice Cube, Deadly Threat)	
1993	Tha Triflin' Album	King Tee	"Where's a Hoe Sat (Cont.)"	
1993	Tha Triflin' Album	King Tee	"Tha Great"	
1993	Neva Again	Kam	"Watts Riot" (feat. Ice Cube)	
1993	Time and Chance	Color Me Badd	"Time and Chance"	
1993	Time and Chance	Color Me Badd	"Groovy Now"	
1994	Mind, Body & Song	Jade	"There's Not a Man"	
1994	Mind, Body & Song	Jade	"It's On"	
1994	12"	Guesss	"It's You That I Need (Da Poohy Old Skool Remix)"	
1994	12"	Threat	"Shut Your Punk Ass Up" +/- Remix	
1994	Things Are Looking Grimm	Mista Grimm	"Nuttins Changed"	
1995	IV Life	King Tee	"Super Nigga" (feat. DJ Pooh, Rashad)	
1995	Dogg Food	The Dogg Pound	"New York, New York" (feat. Snoop Doggy Dogg)	
1995	Dogg Food	The Dogg Pound	"Smooth" (feat. Snoop Doggy Dogg, Val Young, Slo Jammin', Ricky Harris)	
1995	Friday (soundtrack)	Threat	"Lettin' Niggas Know"	
1995	12"	LBC Crew	"Beware of My Crew (DJ Pooh Remix)"	
1996	12"	Eazy-E	"Creep N Crawl"	
1996	All Eyez on Me	2Pac	"When We Ride" (feat. Outlawz)	
1996	Tha Doggfather	Snoop Doggy Dogg	"Up Jump tha Boogie" (feat. Kurupt)	
1996	Tha Doggfather	Snoop Doggy Dogg	"Snoop Bounce" (feat. Charlie Wilson)	
1996	Tha Doggfather	Snoop Doggy Dogg	"Vapors" (feat. Teena Marie, Charlie Wilson)	
1996	Tha Doggfather	Snoop Doggy Dogg	"2001" (feat. Bad Azz, Kurupt)	
1996	Tha Doggfather	Snoop Doggy Dogg	"Snoop's Upside Ya Head" (feat. Charlie Wilson)	
1996	Tha Doggfather	Snoop Doggy Dogg	"Doggyland"	
1997	Bad Newz Travels Fast	DJ Pooh	"Intro"	
1997	Bad Newz Travels Fast	DJ Pooh	"Bump Yo Speakers" (feat. Threat)	
1997	Bad Newz Travels Fast	DJ Pooh	"No Idea" (feat. Kam, Charlie Wilson, and Roger Troutman)	
1997	Bad Newz Travels Fast	DJ Pooh	"Grow Room" (feat. Mista Grimm)	
1997	Bad Newz Travels Fast	DJ Pooh	"Whoop! Whoop!"	
1997	Bad Newz Travels Fast	DJ Pooh	"Get Money" (feat. Threat and Tray Deee)	
1997	Bad Newz Travels Fast	DJ Pooh	"New World Order" (feat. Low Life Gangsters & Bad Ass)	
1997	Bad Newz Travels Fast	DJ Pooh	"Bad Newz Travels Fast" (feat. T-Lee from The L.A. Zuu)	
1997	Bad Newz Travels Fast	DJ Pooh	"Ebonics" (feat. Mista Grimm)	
1997	Bad Newz Travels Fast	DJ Pooh	"Get Off" (feat. Threat)	
1997	Bad Newz Travels Fast	DJ Pooh	"Who Cares"	
1997	Bad Newz Travels Fast	DJ Pooh	"MC's Must Come Down" (feat. Mista Grimm)	
1997	Bad Newz Travels Fast	DJ Pooh	"No Where 2 Hide" (feat. Threat)	
1997	Bad Newz Travels Fast	DJ Pooh	"You Ain't Shit" (feat. Mista Grimm)	
1997	Bad Newz Travels Fast	DJ Pooh	"Gangsta Vocabulary" (feat. Threat)	
1997	In tha Beginning...There Was Rap	"Freaky Tales"	Snoop Doggy Dogg	
1998	Da Game Is to Be Sold, Not to Be Told	Snoop Dogg	"Show Me Love" (feat. Charlie Wilson)	
1998	Word on tha Streets	Bad Azz	"We Be Puttin' It Down" (feat. Snoop Dogg)	
1998	Word on tha Streets	Bad Azz	"Ghetto Star"	
1998	The Mix Tape, Vol. III	Funkmaster Flex	"Whoop Whoop" (feat. DJ Pooh)	
1998	Burn Hollywood Burn Soundtrack	Tamika McClelland	"Money"	

== 2000s ==
Year	Album	Singer	Title	Ref
2000	Dead Man Walkin'	Snoop Dogg	"Hit Rocks"	
2000	3 Strikes (soundtrack)	Tha Eastsidaz	"G'd Up"	
2000	3 Strikes (soundtrack)	Lil Zane and Da Howg	"Worldwide Renegades"	
2000	3 Strikes (soundtrack)	Sauce Money	"Chart Climbin'"	
2000	3 Strikes (soundtrack)	Solo and Kam	"Where I Come From"	
2000	3 Strikes (soundtrack)	E-40	"I'm Straight"	
2000	3 Strikes (soundtrack)	Likwit Crew	"Where da Paper At"	
2000	3 Strikes (soundtrack)	Silkk the Shocker	"Where Dey At"	
2000	3 Strikes (soundtrack)	Nio Renee and Blue	"Gotta Hold on Me"	
2000	3 Strikes (soundtrack)	Ras Kass	"West Coast Mentality"	
2000	3 Strikes (soundtrack)	C-Murder	"Been a Long Time"	
2000	3 Strikes (soundtrack)	Choclair	"Let's Ride"	
2000	3 Strikes (soundtrack)	Total	"Crave"	
2001	Kamnesia	Kam	"Where I Come From"	
2001	Duces 'n Trayz: The Old Fashioned Way	Tha Eastsidaz	"Welcome 2 tha House" (feat. Nate Dogg and Tha Angels)	
2001	The Wash OST	Dr. Dre, Snoop Dogg	"The Wash"	
2003	Penitentiary Chances	Gangsta	"Dog Gone Shame"	
2004	The Hard Way	213	"Groupie Luv"	
2004	Welcome to Tha Chuuch vol. 4: Sunday School	213	"So Fly (DJ Pooh Remix)"	
2004	The Ruthless Chronicles	King Tee	"Sucka Free"	
2006	Tha Blue Carpet Treatment	Snoop Dogg	"Conversations" (feat. Stevie Wonder, Azuré)	
2006	Down for Life	D4L	"Betcha Can't Do It Like Me"	
2006	Down for Life	D4L	"Do It Like Me Baby"	
2010	Origin of Violence	Three One Se7en	"It Was a Bad Day" (feat. Da Lokust)	
2011	A New Beginning	Vernon Little	"As Good As It Gets"	
2011	Haven't You Heard	LBC Crew	"Feels Good 2 Be DPG"	
2011	Haven't You Heard	LBC Crew	"I'll Smoke to That"	
2012	The Art of Dying	Ca$his	"Threat (Nowhere II Hide)"	
2016	Velvet Portraits	Terrace Martin	"Turkey Taco"	
2018	Everythang's Corrupt	Ice Cube	"Ain't Got No Haters" (feat. Too $hort)	
