= King T discography =

This is the discography of American rapper King T.

== Albums ==
=== Studio albums ===
Title	Release	Peak chart positions	
Title	Release	US	US R&B
Act a Fool	Released: 1988; Label: Capitol; Format: CD, cassette, LP	125	35
At Your Own Risk	Released: 1990; Label: Capitol; Format: CD, cassette, LP	175	35
Tha Triflin' Album	Released: 1993; Label: Capitol; Format: CD, cassette, LP	95	17
IV Life	Released: 1995; Label: MCA; Format: CD, cassette, LP	171	23
Thy Kingdom Come	Released: 1998 (unreleased); 2002; Label: Moe Beats Records; Format: CD, cassette	—	—

=== Compilation albums ===
- Having a "T" Party with Ice-T (1991)
- Ruff Rhymes: Greatest Hits Collection (1998)
- The Ruthless Chronicles (2004)

=== Mixtapes ===
- San Andreas: The Original Mixtape w/ Young Maylay (2005) (Producer, featured artist)
- Boss Up, Volume 1 (2006)
- Still Triflin' (2012)

== Singles ==
- 1987: "Payback's a Mutha"
- 1987: "The Coolest"
- 1988: "Bass"
- 1989: "Act a Fool"
- 1990: "Ruff Rhyme (Back Again)"
- 1990: "At Your Own Risk"
- 1990: "Diss You"
- 1990: "Played Like a Piano" w/ Ice Cube and Breeze
- 1992: "Got It Bad Y'all"
- 1992: "Bust Dat Ass"
- 1993: "Black Togetha Again"
- 1994: "Dippin'"
- 1995: "Way Out There"
- 1995: "Free Style Ghetto" w/ Xzibit, Tha Alkaholiks and MC Breeze
- 1998: "Got It Lock'd" (from original 1998 Aftermath-planned release of Thy Kingdom Come)
- 2001: "Back Up" w/ Phil Da Agony
- 2003: "Get Ready 2 Ride" w/ Battle Cat
- 2003: "Stop on By" w/ Tray Dee
- 2012: "Still In Business" w/ Xzibit, Butch Cassidy and Silky Slim

== Guest appearances ==
Title	Release	Other artist(s)	Album
"We're All in the Same Gang"	1990	Body & Soul, Def Jef, Michel'le, Tone-Lōc, Above the Law, Ice-T, Dr. Dre, MC Ren, Eazy-E, J. J. Fad, Young MC, Digital Underground, Oaktown's 357, MC Hammer	We're All in the Same Gang
"Think About It (Trag New Mix)"	1992	Jazzie Redd, MC Trouble	The Colors of Jazz
"Likwit"	1993	Tha Alkaholiks	21 & Over
"Bullshit"	1993	Tha Alkaholiks	21 & Over
"All the Way Live"	1995	Tha Alkaholiks, Q-Tip	Coast II Coast
"DAAAM!"	1995	Tha Alkaholiks, Xzibit	Coast II Coast
"Bottoms Up"	1995	Tha Alkaholiks	Coast II Coast
"Where You From? (Westside Hoodsta's Remix)"	1996	Dazzie Dee, Toddy Tee, Mixmaster Spade	Where's My Receipt?
"Positively Negative"	1996	Xzibit	At the Speed of Life
"Str-8 Gone"	1996	none	Dr. Dre Presents: The Aftermath
"Fame"	1996	Jheryl Lockhart & RC	Dr. Dre Presents: The Aftermath
"Funny Style"	1997	Tha Alkaholiks	Likwidation
"West Riden"	1997	Spice 1	Big Thangs
"Let It Rain"	1998	Xzibit, Tha Alkaholiks	40 Dayz & 40 Nightz
"Don't Let the Money Make You"	1998	Xzibit, Soopafly	40 Dayz & 40 Nightz
"I Don't Wanna Die"	1999	none	Thicker than Water soundtrack
"Check Your Game"	1999	Ice-T	Seventh Deadly Sin
"Some L.A. Niggaz"	1999	Hittman, Defari, Xzibit, Knoc-turn'al, Time Bomb, MC Ren, Kokane	2001
"Cali Expert"	1999	none	The Union Presents: Organized Rhymes
"You Better Believe"	2000	Xzibit	Likwit Rhymes
"West Coast Hip Hop"	2000	Xzibit, Kurupt	Likwit Rhymes
"Loud & Clear"	2000	Xzibit, Defari, Butch Cassidy	Restless
"The Bubble"	2001	Tha Alkaholiks	X.O. Experience
"P.T.A. (Planes, Trains, Automobiles)"	2001	Masta Ace, Tha Alkaholiks	Disposable Arts
"Southland Killers"	2001	Cypress Hill, MC Ren	Stoned Raiders
"Get on Down"	2002	Xzibit, Ice-T, Mac Mall, Kurupt	Still More Bounce
"Poppin' Off"	2006	Xzibit, DJ Quik	Full Circle
"Last of tha Likwit"	2011	RBX	Calm Before the Storm
"LA 2 Tricity"	2012	Roach, Kokane	Trójmiejski Funk
"Louis XIII"	2012	Xzibit, Tha Alkaholiks	Napalm
"Bullets"	2012	C-Bo, Slim the Mobster	Orca
"Summertime"	2014	Clipping	CLPPNG
"Selfish"	2015	DJ EFN, Fashawn, Kurupt	Another Time
"The Feast"	2016	A.B. Original	Reclaim Australia
"St. Ides"	2016	none	The St. Ides Bootleg
"King Tee's Beer Stand"	2016	Ice Cube	The St. Ides Bootleg
"Do You Wanna Go to the Liquor Store?"	2016	none	The St. Ides Bootleg
"You Need a 6-Pack"	2016	Yo-Yo	The St. Ides Bootleg
"Tha Bomb Malt Liquor"	2016	DJ Pooh	The St. Ides Bootleg
"Do You Like St. Ides"	2016	DJ Pooh	The St. Ides Bootleg
"40oz Fit for a King"	2016	DJ Pooh	The St. Ides Bootleg
"Da Flavor"	2016	Tha Alkaholiks	The St. Ides Bootleg
"Let's Have Some St. Ides"	2016	Tha Alkaholiks	The St. Ides Bootleg
"Red or Blue"	2019	Ice-T, M. Dot Taylor, C.O.C, Glasses Malone	The Foundation
"Notified"	2025	Xzibit, Cold 187um	Kingmaker
