= Breeze (rapper) =

American rapper

MC Breeze
- Born: Morgan Rodriguez
- Origin: Los Angeles, California, US
- Genres: Hip hop
- Occupation: Rapper
- Years active: 1988–1995, 2007
- Label: Atlantic Records

Morgan Rodriguez, professionally known by his stage name MC Breeze (or simply Breeze), is an American rapper from Los Angeles. He released his only studio album, T.Y.S.O.N. (The Young Son of No One), in 1989 via Atlantic Records. The album, which was produced by the L.A. Posse, made it to number 60 on the US Billboard Top R&B/Hip-Hop Albums. The record spawned two singles: "Great Big Freak" and "L.A. Posse". The latter peaked at No. 79 on the US Hot R&B/Hip-Hop Songs, No. 8 on the US Hot Rap Songs, and later was ranked at No. 64 by Complex's list of The 100 Best L.A. Rap Songs.

He collaborated with fellow West Coast hip hop artist King Tee, appearing on "Just Clowning" from 1988 Act a Fool, "Played Like a Piano" from 1990 At Your Own Risk, and "Free Style Ghetto" from 1995 IV Life. He also made cameo appearances on the L.A. Posse's only studio album, They Come In All Colors, released in 1991, and on the T-Bone's 1995 album Tha Life of a Hoodlum.

His notability was substantiated by his inclusion on the west coast remix of "Where Are They Now", a song presented by Nas where notable artists from the earlier history of hip hop were featured as a sort of tribute to their contribution to the music genre.

== Discography ==
Studio albums

- T.Y.S.O.N. (The Young Son of No One) (1989, Atlantic Records) - #60 US R&B

Singles

- "Great Big Freak" (1989, Atlantic Records)
- "L.A. Posse" (1989, Atlantic Records) - #79 US R&B, #8 US Rap
- "It Ain't Funky No Mo' / Black Owned / Bad Press" (1992, Hollywood & Vine Records)

Guest appearances

- "Just Clowing" by King Tee and Mixmaster Spade from Act a Fool © 1988 Capitol Records
- "Played Like a Piano" by King Tee and Ice Cube from At Your Own Risk © 1990 Capitol Records
- "Free Style Ghetto" by King Tee, Tha Alkaholiks and Xzibit from IV Life © 1994 MCA Records
- "Where Are They Now (West Coast Remix)" by Nas, Kam, King Tee, Candyman, Threat, Ice-T, Sir Mix-a-Lot and The Conscious Daughters © 2007
