= Jazzy =

Jazzy is an adjective that describes a subject with resemblance to jazz, in a literal (in terms of music) or symbolic sense.

Jazzy, Jazze or Jazzie may also refer to:

- Jazzie B, English DJ
- Jazzie Collins, activist
- Jazzie Redd, radio personality
- Jazzy (singer) (born 1996), Irish dance pop singer
- Jazzy B (born 1975), Canadian singer
- Jazzy Collins, American Casting Director
- Jazzy Danziger, (born 1984), American poet
- Jazzy Davidson (born 2006), American basketball player
- Jazzy Jay (born 1961), American hip hop DJ
- Jazzy King (born 1990), one half of British pop duo Blonde Electra
- Jazzy de Lisser (born 1991), English actress
- Jazzy M (born 1962), English record producer
- Jazzy's World TV (born 2010), American broadcast journalist
- Jazze Pha, American record producer
- Don Jazzy (born 1982), Nigerian record executive
- Alpha Female (born 1982), German bodybuilder who uses the alias "Jazzy Bi"
- Jasmine Kerber (born 1996), American rhythmic gymnast
- Jazzy, a 2024 American film

== See also ==
- Jaz-O (born 1965), American rapper and producer
- Jay-Z (born 1969), American rapper and businessman
