= True to the Game =

Single by Ice Cube

from the album Death Certificate
- B-side: "Givin' Up the Nappy Dug Out" ("R" rated edit); "Givin' Up the Nappy Dug Out" (album version)
- Released: September 14, 1992
- Recorded: 1991
- Genre: Gangsta rap; West Coast hip hop; political hip hop
- Length: 4:16
- Label: Priority
- Songwriter: O'Shea Jackson
- Producers: Ice Cube; Sir Jinx

Ice Cube singles chronology
"Steady Mobbin'" (1991)	"True to the Game" (1992)	"Wicked" (1992)

"True to the Game" is the second single from Ice Cube's Death Certificate album. It takes tunes from The Gap Band’s 1982 hit, Outstanding.

== Video content ==
In the video, Ice Cube kidnaps various rappers (some resembling his former bandmates) who are portrayed as "record sellers" and not "true to the game". The video's outdoor scenes are set on Crenshaw Boulevard, which in the aftermath of the 1992 Los Angeles riots featured many burned-out buildings. Another scene in a photo studio shows a rapper (apparently intended to be MC Hammer) clad in hardcore-style clothing who later changes into a red sequined outfit, symbolizing and parodying his transition into mainstream pop music. The video features appearances by DJ Pooh and actress and Friends star Lisa Kudrow. The official music video was directed by F. Gary Gray.

== Meaning of lyrics ==
"True to the Game" laments the trend of hip hop artists and other celebrities crossing over into mainstream music. More broadly, the song's lyrics criticize African American assimilation into the middle class.

The song is a condemnation of Uncle Toms who sell out themselves to white communities and audiences: "Stop selling out your race, and wipe that stupid-ass smile off your face."

In particular, he calls out rappers who switch from hardcore in an attempt to cater to overwhelmingly white audiences at the expense of integrity, those who fail to be in touch with their roots, and especially blacks who snobbishly align themselves with a white clique at the expense of fidelity to their own:

You put on your suit and tie and your big clothes, You don't associate with the NEGROES
You wanna be just like Jack, But Jack is calling you a nigger behind your back.
So back off genius, I don't need you to correct my broken English.
