= Act a Fool =

Act a Fool may refer to:

- Act a Fool (album), a 1988 album by King Tee
- "Act a Fool" (Ludacris song), a 2003 single by Ludacris
- "Act a Fool" (Lil Jon song), a 2006 single by Lil Jon
- "Act a Fool", a 2019 single by Rick Ross from his album Port of Miami 2
