= Death Certificate (album) =

Studio album by Ice Cube
- Released: October 29, 1991
- Recorded: 1991
- Studio: Paramount (Los Angeles)
- Genres: West Coast hip-hop; gangsta rap; political hip-hop; hardcore hip-hop
- Length: 60:59
- Label: Priority
- Producers: Ice Cube (also exec.); Sir Jinx; the Boogie Men

Ice Cube chronology
Kill at Will (1990)	Death Certificate (1991)	The Predator (1992)

Singles from Death Certificate
- 1. "Steady Mobbin'" Released: August 9, 1991; 2. "True to the Game" Released: September 14, 1992

Death Certificate is the second studio album by American rapper Ice Cube. It was released on October 29, 1991, through Priority Records. The album was produced by Sir Jinx, DJ Pooh, and Ice Cube. It was supported by two singles: "Steady Mobbin'" and "True to the Game".

Due to some of its racially and politically charged content, and Ice Cube's acerbic statements on drug dealing, racial profiling, and the right to keep and bear arms, the album was the source of both critical acclaim and much controversy upon its release. Death Certificate was a commercial success, debuting at number two on the US Billboard 200 chart, selling 105,000 copies in its first week. The album was certified platinum by the Recording Industry Association of America (RIAA) in December 1991.

== Background ==
The writing and recording of Death Certificate began in late 1990 and carried on throughout most of 1991. While making the album, Ice Cube was also heavily involved in several other projects, including Yo-Yo's debut album Make Way for the Motherlode, his younger cousin Del tha Funkee Homosapien's I Wish My Brother George Was Here, and perhaps more importantly, his film debut, Boyz n the Hood, in which he co-starred with Cuba Gooding, Jr. and Laurence Fishburne. Similar to AmeriKKKa's Most Wanted, Ice Cube was very active in the album's production, though the overall sound differed. Unlike AmeriKKKa's Most Wanted, which featured the Bomb Squad's hard edged beats, Death Certificate featured a slightly more West Coast-oriented sound in comparison, with heavy use of 70's Funk and Soul samples. A number of the tracks also use samples taken from acts such as Zapp (Ohio) and Fishbone (California).

== Content ==
Death Certificate was roughly organized as two thematic elements of a larger whole, and opens with Cube's explanation: "The Death Side: a mirror image of where we are today; The Life Side: a vision of where we need to go." The first half, therefore, is replete with the tales of drug dealing, whore-mongering and violence expected of a gangsta rap album in 1991. The sleeve booklet also included the following quote from Ice Cube, which showed the influence of the Nation of Islam on his work.

The reason I say nigga is because we are mentally dead even in 1991. We have limited knowledge of self, so it leads to a nigga mentality. The best place for a young Black male or female is the Nation of Islam. Soon as we as a people use our knowledge of self to our advance we will then be able to become and be called Blacks.

The Death Side's "A Bird in the Hand" laments a young man's slide into a life of drug-dealing for economic survival.

Do I have to sell me a whole lot of crack
For decent shelter and clothes on my back?
Or should I just wait for help from Bush?
Or Jesse Jackson and Operation PUSH?

The Life Side's "Black Korea" threatens rioting and arson alongside Black entrepreneurship as a response to the preponderance of Korean-owned grocery stores in ghettos across the United States. The track was seen as a response to the killing of Latasha Harlins, a 15-year-old African American girl who was shot to death by a Korean-American store owner on March 16, 1991, in an altercation over a bottle of orange juice. Since the release of the track preceded the 1992 Los Angeles riots, in which many of the people targeted were of Korean descent, Ice Cube was accused of inciting racism by African-Americans towards Asians. In a 2018 interview with the South Korean DongA Ilbo newspaper, Ice Cube acknowledged that the track was insulting to Asians and described it as a "failed song", listing it alongside "Cave Bitch" (from his 1993 album Lethal Injection) as a track he wanted to go back and modify or soften the lyrics of.

"Horny Lil' Devil" was a track aimed at sexual relationships between White men and Black women. The producer Sir Jinx, who had worked with Ice Cube on much of the album, cited the track as an example of how he and Ice Cube went different ways, saying "I didn’t really wanna do music like that."

The track "Look Who's Burnin'" tells of the dangers of sexually transmitted infection in low income neighborhoods, while "Alive on Arrival" tells the story of a young man caught in the crossfire of a gang shootout who slowly bleeds to death while in a hospital waiting room, being questioned by police. "Color Blind" preaches neutrality and brotherhood between gangs, such as the Bloods and Crips. Although Ice Cube's previous album avoided direct attacks on N.W.A, Death Certificate contained "True to the Game" and most notably "No Vaseline", which were diss tracks aimed at his former bandmates.

Unlike Ice Cube's other albums, Death Certificate was not released in a censored version. The tracks "Steady Mobbin'", "True To The Game", and "Givin' up the Nappy Dug Out", were, however, recorded with clean lyrics and released for airplay.

== Release ==
The album was originally released on October 29, 1991. It was highly anticipated with over one million advanced orders. In 2003, Priority Records re-released Death Certificate with the bonus track "How to Survive in South Central", which originally appeared on the Boyz n the Hood soundtrack. Death Certificate included the diss track "No Vaseline" which is a response to his former hip hop group N.W.A, and their album Niggaz4Life which included direct and indirect diss tracks and verses to Ice Cube. "No Vaseline" is considered to be one of the greatest diss tracks of all time due to its explicit and direct subject matter towards the members of the group.

The album was re-released for the 25th anniversary edition on June 9, 2017, by Interscope Records after Cube announced signing to the label in late May 2017.

== Controversy ==
In 1991, the Oregon Liquor Control Commission banned a poster for St. Ides Malt Liquor, which Ice Cube endorsed at the time, that displayed Ice Cube holding a can of St. Ides and flashing a gang sign. In the September 2006 issue of FHM, Ice Cube stated in an interview that he did not regret the controversial statements made on the album.

Due to fear that laws against racial incitement in the United Kingdom could see the album banned, the original United Kingdom release removed the tracks "Black Korea" and "No Vaseline". Island Records, the distributor of this version of the album, deleted these tracks with the consent of Priority Records, but not Ice Cube himself. "We're very excited about Ice Cube", said Island MD Marc Marot, "but on a personal level I just could not take those two songs. I understand that self-censorship after the NWA case puts us in a strange position, but we're not going to support minority racism or antisemitism. We came to a compromise with Priority that was acceptable." The tracks have since been reinstated on a CD reissue readily available in the UK.

== Critical reception ==
Contemporary professional ratings
Review scores
Source	Rating
Chicago Sun-Times	4/4 stars
Chicago Tribune	3/4 stars
Entertainment Weekly	A−
Los Angeles Times	3/4 stars
NME	8/10
Select	4/5
The Source	4.5/5 stars

Death Certificate received critical acclaim. "His homophobia may be irksome", wrote Ted Kessler in Select, "but the shock value of these views has been blunted by lesser rappers. It's the sublime combination of '70s P-Funk and Ice Cube's excellent, taut delivery of rhymes calculated to jolt that pleases." Spin wrote that it "integrates vitriolic politics with raw street knowledge" and "achieves an almost George Clinton-esque sense of celebratory freakiness".

"There's a rule in music journalism at the moment", observed the hip-hop fanzine Louder Than A Bomb!. "It says that every Ice-T/N.W.A./Ice Cube record must be described as something like 'a grisly and uncompromising portrait of life in the ghetto'… O.G. was the last. Death Certificate is the next. [But] you can't shut your eyes while listening and imagine the ghetto. It's just a lot of songs about shooting, shagging and N.W.A."

Death Certificate received a meager $18,000 promotion budget, and neither of its singles, "Steady Mobbin'" and "True to the Game", received much airplay, although they did receive music videos.

Retrospective professional ratings
Review scores
Source	Rating
AllMusic	5/5 stars
The Austin Chronicle	4/5 stars
Blender	3/5 stars
Christgau's Consumer Guide	C+
Pitchfork	9.5/10
Record Collector	4/5 stars
Rolling Stone	4/5 stars
The Rolling Stone Album Guide	4/5 stars
The Source	5/5 stars
Spin Alternative Record Guide	10/10

In a retrospective review, AllMusic called Death Certificate "even harder and angrier than AmeriKKKa's Most Wanted ... It continues the sharp insights and unflinching looks at contemporary urban lifestyles that his solo debut only hinted at; in short, it's hardcore without any gangsta posturing." They also call it "funkier, noisier, and more musically effective (than AmeriKKKa)." Initially giving a four-and-a-half out of five "mic" rating, The Source retrospectively awarded Death Certificate full marks in a list of "5 Mic Hip-Hop Classics", in its 150th issue.

=== Accolades ===
- Ranked #8 in MTV's Greatest Hip-Hop Albums of All Time list in 2005
- Included in The Source's 100 Best Rap Albums list in 1998
- Ranked #12 in About.com's 100 Greatest Hip-Hip Albums list in 2008
- Ranked #5 in ego trip's Hip Hop's 25 Greatest Albums by Year 1980–98 list in 1999
- Ranked #20 in Dance De Lux's 25 Best Hip-Hop Records list in 2001
- Ranked #16 in The Village Voice's Best Albums of the Year list in 1991
- Ranked #37 in New Musical Express's Best Albums of the Year list in 1991
- Ranked #8 in Hip Hop Connection's reader-voted The Phat Forty
- Included in Vibe's 100 Essential Albums of the 20th Century in 1999
- Included in Rhapsody's list of the top "coke rap" albums of all time in 2010.

== Commercial performance ==
Death Certificate debuted at number two on the US Billboard 200 chart, selling 105,000 copies in its first week. This became Ice Cube's first US top-ten debut. The album also debuted at number one on the US Top R&B/Hip-Hop Albums chart. On December 20, 1991, the album was certified platinum by the Recording Industry Association of America (RIAA) for sales of over a million copies. It was certified only two months after the album was released. As of March 2020, the album has sold over two million copies in the United States.

On September 4, 2015, Death Certificate went back on the Billboard 200 chart and ranked at number 99 with 14,000 sales in that week; also, Greatest Hits and AmeriKKKa's Most Wanted came back on the Billboard 200 in that week with Greatest Hits charting at number 118 with 11,920 sales and AmeriKKKa's Most Wanted at number 150 with 8,300 sales.

== Track listing ==
The Death Side
No.	Title	Writer(s)	Producer(s)	Length
1.	"The Funeral (Intro)"	O’Shea Jackson; Anthony Wheaton	Sir Jinx	1:37
2.	"The Wrong Nigga to Fuck Wit"	Jackson; Wheaton; George Clinton; Bernie Worrell; William Collins	Sir Jinx; Ice Cube	2:48
3.	"My Summer Vacation"	Jackson; Clinton; Garry Shider; David Spradley	Boogiemen; Ice Cube	3:56
4.	"Steady Mobbin'"	Jackson; Alan Gorrie; Hamish Stuart; Roger Ball	Boogiemen; Ice Cube	4:10
5.	"Robin Lench (Interlude)"	Jackson; Wheaton; Mark Jordan	Boogiemen; Sir Jinx	1:13
6.	"Givin' Up the Nappy Dug Out"	Jackson; Clinton; Worrell; Michael Hampton; Al Jackson; Booker Jones; Steve Cropper; Donald Dunn	Boogiemen; Ice Cube	4:15
7.	"Look Who's Burnin'"	Jackson; Clinton; Dewayne McKnight; Peter Brown; Robert Rans; Curtis Mayfield; Tony Davis	Sir Jinx; Ice Cube	3:53
8.	"A Bird in the Hand"	Jackson; Clinton; Collins; Jordan; Shider; Ronald Dunbar; Donnie Sterling	Boogiemen; Ice Cube	2:17
9.	"Man's Best Friend"	Jackson; Jordan; Collins; Worrell; Clinton; Shider; Spradley; O'Kelly Isley; Rudolph Isley; Ronald Isley	Boogiemen; Ice Cube	2:06
10.	"Alive on Arrival"	Jackson; Jordan; Clinton; Dunbar; Sterling; Teren Jones	Boogiemen; Ice Cube	3:11
11.	"Death" (featuring Khalid Abdul Muhammad)	Jackson; Jordan; Bobby Ervin	Ice Cube	1:03

The Life Side
No.	Title	Writer(s)	Producer(s)	Length
12.	"The Birth" (featuring Khalid Abdul Muhammad)	Jackson; Wheaton	Sir Jinx; Ice Cube	1:21
13.	"I Wanna Kill Sam"	Jackson; Harold Clayton; Sigidi Abdullah; Bradley Ridgell	Sir Jinx; Ice Cube	3:22
14.	"Horny Lil' Devil"	Jackson; Jordan; Lou Donaldson	Boogiemen; Ice Cube	3:42
15.	"Black Korea"	Jackson	Sir Jinx; Ice Cube	0:46
16.	"True to the Game"	Jackson; Raymond Calhoun	Sir Jinx; Ice Cube	4:10
17.	"Color Blind" (featuring Deadly Threat, Kam, the Maad Circle, King Tee and J-Dee)	Jackson; George Porter; Art Neville; Joseph Modeliste; Leo Nocentelli; Artis Ivey; Dasean Cooper; Craig Miller; William Calhoun; Roger McBride; Corey Brown	Boogiemen; Ice Cube	4:29
18.	"Doing Dumb Shit"	Jackson; Clinton; Worrell; Collins	Boogiemen; Ice Cube	3:45
19.	"Us"	Jackson; Wheaton; Clinton; Worrell; Collins	Sir Jinx; Ice Cube	3:43
20.	"No Vaseline"	Jackson; Wheaton; Clinton; Shider; Spradley; Reginald Hargis; Raymond Ransom; Edward Irons	Sir Jinx; Ice Cube	5:12
Total length:				60:59

25th Anniversary Edition
No.	Title	Producer(s)	Length
1.	"Only One Me"	Checkboy; Ice Cube	3:40
2.	"Good Cop, Bad Cop"	T-Mix; Ice Cube	3:27
3.	"Dominate the Weak"	Big SOJ; Ice Cube	4:06
4.	"The Funeral (Intro)"	Sir Jinx	1:37
5.	"The Wrong Nigga to Fuck Wit"	Sir Jinx; Ice Cube	2:48
6.	"My Summer Vacation"	Boogiemen; Ice Cube	3:56
7.	"Steady Mobbin'"	Boogiemen; Ice Cube	4:10
8.	"Robin Lench (Interlude)"	Boogiemen; Sir Jinx	1:13
9.	"Givin' Up the Nappy Dug Out"	Boogiemen; Ice Cube	4:15
10.	"Look Who's Burnin'"	Sir Jinx; Ice Cube	3:53
11.	"A Bird in the Hand"	Boogiemen; Ice Cube	2:17
12.	"Man's Best Friend"	Boogiemen; Ice Cube	2:06
13.	"Alive on Arrival"	Boogiemen; Ice Cube	3:11
14.	"Death" (featuring Khalid Abdul Muhammad)	Ice Cube	1:03
15.	"The Birth" (featuring Khalid Abdul Muhammad)	Sir Jinx; Ice Cube	1:21
16.	"I Wanna Kill Sam"	Sir Jinx; Ice Cube	3:22
17.	"Horny Lil Devil"	Boogiemen; Ice Cube	3:42
18.	"Black Korea"	Sir Jinx; Ice Cube	0:46
19.	"True to the Game"	Sir Jinx; Ice Cube	4:10
20.	"Color Blind" (featuring Deadly Threat, Kam, the Maad Circle, King Tee and J-Dee)	Boogiemen; Ice Cube	4:29
21.	"Doing Dumb Shit"	Boogiemen; Ice Cube	3:45
22.	"Us"	Sir Jinx; Ice Cube	3:43
23.	"No Vaseline"	Sir Jinx; Ice Cube	5:15
Total length:			72:15

Complete Edition
No.	Title	Producer(s)	Length
1.	"The Funeral (Intro)"	Sir Jinx	1:37
2.	"The Wrong Nigga to Fuck Wit"	Sir Jinx; Ice Cube	2:48
3.	"My Summer Vacation"	Boogiemen; Ice Cube	3:56
4.	"Steady Mobbin'"	Boogiemen; Ice Cube	4:10
5.	"Robin Lench (Interlude)"	Boogiemen; Sir Jinx	1:13
6.	"Givin' Up the Nappy Dug Out"	Boogiemen; Ice Cube	4:15
7.	"Look Who's Burnin'"	Sir Jinx; Ice Cube	3:53
8.	"A Bird in the Hand"	Boogiemen; Ice Cube	2:17
9.	"Man's Best Friend"	Boogiemen; Ice Cube	2:06
10.	"Alive on Arrival"	Boogiemen; Ice Cube	3:11
11.	"Death" (featuring Khalid Abdul Muhammad)	Ice Cube	1:03
12.	"The Birth" (featuring Khalid Abdul Muhammad)	Sir Jinx; Ice Cube	1:21
13.	"I Wanna Kill Sam"	Sir Jinx; Ice Cube	3:22
14.	"Horny Lil' Devil"	Boogiemen; Ice Cube	3:42
15.	"Black Korea"	Sir Jinx; Ice Cube	0:46
16.	"True to the Game"	Sir Jinx; Ice Cube	4:10
17.	"Color Blind" (featuring Deadly Threat, Kam, the Maad Circle, King Tee and J-Dee)	Boogiemen; Ice Cube	4:29
18.	"Doing Dumb Shit"	Boogiemen; Ice Cube	3:45
19.	"Us"	Sir Jinx; Ice Cube	3:43
20.	"No Vaseline"	Sir Jinx; Ice Cube	5:15
21.	"Only One Me"	Checkboy; Ice Cube	3:40
22.	"Good Cop, Bad Cop"	T-Mix; Ice Cube	3:27
23.	"Dominate the Weak"	Big SOJ; Ice Cube	4:06
24.	"Trying to Maintain"	Hallway Productionz; Ice Cube	3:33
Total length:			75:48

== Personnel ==
- Ice Cube – performer, producer, executive producer, mixing
- Khalid Muhammad – performer
- Deadly Threat – performer
- Kam – performer
- WC and the Maad Circle – performer
- King Tee – performer
- J-Dee – performer
- DJ Bobcat Bobby Ervin – producer
- Sir Jinx – producer, mixing
- Boogie Men – producer
- Bob Morse – engineer, mixing
- Frank Macek – engineer, mixing
- Mr. Stoker (Andy Growcott) – engineer
- DJ Pooh – mixing
- Daryll Dobson – mixing
- Brian Gardner – mastering
- Mario Castellanos – photography
- Kevin Hosmann – art direction

== Charts ==
=== Weekly charts ===
Chart (1991)	Peak position
Australian Albums (ARIA)	141
US Billboard 200	2
US Top R&B/Hip-Hop Albums (Billboard)	1

=== Year-end charts ===
Chart (1992)	Position
US Billboard 200	63
US Top R&B/Hip-Hop Albums (Billboard)	25

== Certifications ==
Region	Certification	Certified units/sales
United States (RIAA)	Platinum	1,000,000^{^}
^{^} Shipments figures based on certification alone.

== See also ==
- List of number-one R&B albums of 1991 (U.S.)
