= Mystic (singer) =

American rapper

- Also known as: DU Goddess
- Born: Mandolyn Wind Ludlum; March 28, 1974 (age 52); Lower Lake, California, U.S.
- Origin: Oakland, California, U.S.
- Genres: Hip hop
- Occupations: Singer; rapper; songwriter
- Years active: 1990–present
- Labels: Goodvibe; DreamWorks; Beautifull Soundworks
- Website: mysticworldwide.com

Mandolyn Wind Ludlum (born March 28, 1974), better known by her stage name Mystic, is an American singer and rapper from the San Francisco Bay Area. After touring and recording with Digital Underground, she released her debut solo album in 2001.

== Early life ==
Born Mandolyn Wind Ludlum on a hippie commune in Lower Lake to a white mother and African-American father, she was raised by her mother after her parents split up when she was three years old (an experience she explores in her song "Fatherless Child"). She grew up in rural California, Hawaii, Mexico, and Oregon before settling in her eventual home base, Oakland, California, in 9th grade. Most of her life has been in the Bay Area, and she says that she's from Oakland because it's where she "became a woman" and discovered herself.

== Music career ==
=== 1991–1996: Career beginnings ===
Ludlum began taking part in MC Battles in the Bay Area in the early 1990s. After dropping out of high school at the end of 11th grade in 1991, she began teaching art in 1996, and also began her recording career, her version of "Gloomy Sunday" appearing on the soundtrack to Abel Ferrara's film The Funeral.

=== 1997–1999: Digital Underground ===
Early on in her musical career, she collaborated with fellow female producer The Angel and toured with Digital Underground between 1997 and 1999, appearing on Digital Underground's Who Got The Gravy album under the name DU Goddess. She worked as a writer for Rude Gal Music before establishing herself as a solo artist.

She signed a solo contract with Goodvibe Recordings in 1999 (signing on the same day her father died of a heroin overdose) after label co-chair Matt Kahane heard her on a mixtape by Bahamadia.

=== 2001–2003: Cuts for Luck and Scars for Freedom ===
She worked with respected underground hip-hop producers including Shock G and A-Plus on her 2001 critically acclaimed debut album, Cuts for Luck and Scars for Freedom, which was labelled as "conscious rap" and saw her receiving comparisons with Lauryn Hill. The album performed poorly in the United States, debuting at number 190, stalling out at number 170 on the Billboard 200 and failing to enter the top 40 of the Top R&B/Hip-Hop Albums chart, peaking at 46. She participated in the summer 2001 Tree of Life tour with her labelmates to promote the album, whose lead single, "The Life", was featured in the ESPN show The Life and a commercial for Bud Light in 2004. She also toured with The Black Eyed Peas in 2001.

The album track "W" featuring her collaboration with Planet Asia was nominated for a Grammy Award in 2001 for the brand new category, at the time, of Best Rap/Song Collaboration. Mystic was also nominated for a BET Award in 2002 in the 'Best female hip-hop artist' category.

The album was reissued with five extra tracks in 2003 on the DreamWorks label, including two new tracks produced by Kanye West, one a collaboration with Mos Def.

=== 2007–2011: European tour and digital album release ===
In 2007, Mystic toured in Europe along with Dave Ghetto, Hezekiah, and DJ Munch. The tour began in Berlin, and they toured through Germany, Austria, and Switzerland.

In August 2011, Cuts for Luck and Scars for Freedom was released as a digital download for the first time via Universal Music Group, with a website also opened featuring stories from fans related to the album.

=== 2013–2019: Music hiatus, academia, non-profit work, and return to music with Beautiful Resistance ===
Mystic eventually took a hiatus from music to focus on her education, earning a Bachelor's degree in Interdisciplinary Studies from UC Berkeley in 2015, and a Master of Science in Comparative and International Education from the University of Oxford in 2019.

She became inspired to keep making music by one of her professors at UC Berkeley, and in 2014, she returned to music with the independent release Beautiful Resistance, released through her own label, Beautifull Soundworks.

Mystic has always been interested in making an impact and sharing a story with her music. She believes "one of the roles of hip-hop as a public art form is to bring traumas out of darkness and into the light, where they can be examined and processed—maybe even let go—in communion with others," and practiced this by rapping about losing her father to a drug overdose and experiencing sexual abuse. She was able to use her music as empowerment, to break the shackles of shame and give a voice to stigmatized struggles.

From 2007–2021, Mystic also worked with the Hip Hop Caucus, a non-profit organization that aims to promote political activism for young U.S. voters using hip-hop music and culture. She held a number of positions over the years, including Organizer, Bay Area Coordinator, Project Manager, Bay Area Advisor, and Program Manager.

=== 2022: Dreaming in Cursive: The Girl Who Loved Sparklers and A Black Love Trilogy ===
In 2022, Mystic released her first solo album in eight years, Dreaming in Cursive: The Girl Who Loved Sparklers. She described this album as her "healed Black woman music", focusing on affirmation and love.

Her latest project, currently in post-production, is a short film called A Black Love Trilogy, which she co-wrote, co-directed and stars in.

== Discography ==
=== Albums ===
- Cuts for Luck and Scars for Freedom (2001), Goodvibe - US #170, reissued (2003), DreamWorks
- Cuts for Luck and Scars for Freedom (Learning to Breath) (2003), Goodvibe, DreamWorks
- Beautiful Resistance (2014), Beautifull Soundworks
- Dreaming In Cursive: The Girl Who Loved Sparklers (2022), Beautifull Soundworks/Soulspazm

=== Singles ===
- "Current Events" (2000), GoodVibe
- "The Life" (2001), GoodVibe
- "The Life" remix by Erik Rico (2001), GoodVibe - featuring Talib Kweli & Kam
- "Girlfriend Sistagirl" (2001), GoodVibe - promo-only
- "Elusive Freedom" / "The Judas Factor" (2001), Raptivism
- "No Competition" (2003), DreamWorks/GoodVibe
- "Breathe (Better Days)" (2003), DreamWorks/GoodVibe - featuring Donell Jones
- "The Forecast" (2004), GoodVibe
- "OK...Alright" (2006), Supa Crucial - digital download only

=== Compilation appearances ===
- The Funeral: Music from and Inspired by the Motion Picture (1996), BMG/Critique - "Gloomy Sunday"
- The New Groove: The Blue Note Remix Project (1996), Blue Note - "Kofi"
- Dark Angel - The Original TV Series Soundtrack (2002), Artemis/Epic - "The Life"
- MTV2 Handpicked (2002), Columbia - "The Life"
- Biker Boyz: Music From The Motion Picture (2002), DreamWorks - "No Competition"
- Underground Airplay Version 1.0 (2001), Rawkus - "Current Events"
- Budweiser commercial (20??), - "The Life"
- Chops - Virtuosity (2003) - "No Pressure"

=== Contributions ===
- The Conscious Daughters - Gamers (1996) Priority Records - vocals on "It Don't Stop" and "All Star Freestyle", background vocals on "Who Got Da Mic" and "TCD Fo' Life (West Coast Bomb)"
- Digital Underground - Who Got the Gravy? (1998), Jake/Interscope - vocals on "April Showers"
- Kam - Kamnesia (2001), JCOR Records, vocals on "Bang Bang" and "What I Look Like"
- Maroon 5 - Songs About Jane (2002), Octone/J Records- background vocals on "Sunday Morning"
- Dave Ghetto – "Hey Young World Pt. 2" (2005), Counterflow - vocals on "Hey Young World Pt. 2"
- Ras Kass - Institutionalized (2005), Re-Up Entertainment - vocals on "Unconditional"
- Aceyalone - "Grand Imperial (album)" (2006), Project Blowed/Decon-vocals on "Everything Changes"
- Waxolutionists - We Paint Colors (2009), Sunshine Enterprises - vocals on "Dance With Me" & "Feet Don't Fail Me"

=== DVD ===
- Soundz of Spirit (2003) - documentary film
