= Tha Triflin' Album =

Studio album by King Tee
- Released: January 26, 1993
- Recorded: 1992
- Studio: Echo Sound (Los Angeles, CA); Kitchen Sync Studios (Hollywood, CA)
- Genre: Hip-hop
- Length: 46:40
- Label: Capitol
- Producer: Broadway; DJ Aladdin; DJ Bobcat; DJ Pooh; King Tee; Marley Marl; Mr. Woody; Slej Tha Ruffedge; Tha Alkaholiks

King Tee chronology
At Your Own Risk (1990)	Tha Triflin' Album (1993)	IV Life (1995)

Singles from Tha Triflin' Album
- 1. "Got It Bad Y'all" Released: November 24, 1992; 2. "Black Togetha Again" Released: April 6, 1993

Professional ratings
Review scores
Source	Rating
AllMusic	2/5 stars
RapReviews	8.5/10
The Source	3.5/5

Tha Triflin' Album is the third studio album by American rapper King Tee. It was released on January 26, 1993, via Capitol Records. The recording sessions took place at Echo Sound and Kitchen Sync Studios in Los Angeles in 1992. The album was produced by DJ Pooh, Broadway, DJ Aladdin, SLJ, DJ Bobcat, Marley Marl, Mr. Woody, Tha Alkaholiks, and King Tee.

It features guest appearances from Ice Cube, Deadly Threat, Nefretitti, Mad Kap, and Tha Alkaholiks. The album spawned two singles: "Got It Bad Y'all" and "Black Togetha Again". Both singles were later included on King Tee's greatest hits compilation Ruff Rhymes: Greatest Hits Collection. The album peaked at number 95 on the US Billboard 200 and number 17 on the Top R&B/Hip-Hop Albums. The success of this album is quite significant as it allowed King Tee's protégés, Tha Alkaholiks, to gain a following. It also provided a foundation for King Tee's Likwit Crew.

== Track listing ==
No.	Title	Writer(s)	Producer(s)	Length
1.	"Drunk Tekneek"	Roger McBride; Walter Morrison; Marshall Jones; Marvin Pierce; Leroy Bonner; Andrew Noland; Ralph Middlebrooks; Bruce Napier; Gregory Webster	DJ Pooh	2:08
2.	"I Gotta Call Earl"	McBride	DJ Pooh	0:20
3.	"I Got It Bad Y'all" (featuring Tha Alkaholiks)	McBride; Eric Brooks; James Robinson	Tha Alkaholiks; DJ Pooh	4:47
4.	"On tha Rox" (featuring Deadly Threat)	McBride; Patrick Patterson; Steve Scipio	Broadway	1:49
5.	"Just Flauntin'"	McBride; Thomas Sylvester Allen; Harold Brown; Morris Dickerson; Leroy Jordan; Charles Miller; Lee Oskar; Howard E. Scott	DJ Aladdin; SLEJ Da Ruff Edge	3:52
6.	"At Your Own Risk" (Budha Mix)	McBride	Marley Marl	3:52
7.	"King Tee's Beer Stand" (featuring Ice Cube)	McBride; O'Shea Jackson	DJ Pooh	1:01
8.	"We Got tha Fat Joint" (featuring Nefertiti and Mad Kap)	McBride; James Broadway	Broadway	4:05
9.	"Where'sa Hoe Sat"	McBride	DJ Pooh	0:46
10.	"Hoe B-4 tha Homie" (featuring Deadly Threat and Ice Cube)	McBride; Corey Lloyd Brown; Jackson	Mr. Woody; DJ Pooh	6:01
11.	"Blow My Sox Off"	McBride; Bobby Ervin	King Tee; DJ Bobcat	3:22
12.	"Where'sa Hoe Sat" (Cont.)	McBride	DJ Pooh	0:40
13.	"Triflin' Nigga"	McBride; Alphonso Henderson	DJ Aladdin; SLEJ Da Ruff Edge	3:30
14.	"Black Togetha Again"	McBride	King Tee	3:49
15.	"Bus Dat Ass" (featuring Tha Alkaholiks)	McBride; Robinson; Brooks	King Tee	4:16
16.	"Tha Great"	McBride	DJ Pooh	2:23
Total length:				46:40

Sample credits

- Track 1 contains a sample from "Introducing the Players" as recorded by the Ohio Players.
- Track 4 contains a sample from "The Message" as recorded by Cymande.
- Track 5 contains a sample from "The World Is a Ghetto" as recorded by War.

== Personnel ==
- Roger "King Tee" McBride – performer (tracks: 1–8, 10, 11, 13–16), producer (tracks: 11, 14, 15), mixing, sleeve notes
- Mark "DJ Pooh" Jordan – performer (tracks: 1–3, 7, 9, 12, 16), producer (tracks: 1–3, 7, 9, 10, 12, 16), mixing
- Eric "E-Swift" Brooks – performer (tracks: 3, 9, 12, 15), producer (tracks: 3, 15)
- James "J-Ro" Robinson – performer & producer (tracks: 3, 15)
- Lloyd "Deadly Threat" Brown – performer (tracks: 4, 10, 14)
- James Broadway – performer (tracks: 4, 8, 14), producer (tracks: 4, 8), mixing
- Alphonso "DJ Aladdin" Henderson – performer & producer (tracks: 5, 13)
- Shafiq "SLJ" Husayn – performer & producer (tracks: 5, 13)
- Marlon "Marley Marl" Williams – performer & producer (track 6)
- O'Shea "Ice Cube" Jackson – performer (tracks: 7, 10)
- Nefertiti Strong – performer (track 8)
- Mad Kap – performers (track 8)
- Jesse "Mr. Woody" Stubblefield – performer & producer (track 10)
- Bobby "DJ Bobcat" Ervin – performer & producer (track 11)
- Dwayne "Muffla" Simon – performer (track 14), mixing
- Bob Morse – engineering
- Frank Macek – engineering
- Anthony "Sir Jinx" Wheaton – mixing
- Glen E. Friedman – photography

== Charts ==
Chart (1993)	Peak position
US Billboard 200	95
US Top R&B/Hip-Hop Albums (Billboard)	17
