= Arrest the President =

Single by Ice Cube

from the album Everythang's Corrupt
- Released: November 9, 2018
- Genre: Political hip hop
- Length: 3:53
- Label: Lench Mob; Interscope
- Songwriters: O'Shea Jackson; S. Johnson
- Producer: ShawnSki

Ice Cube singles chronology
"Good Cop, Bad Cop" (2017)	"Arrest the President" (2018)	"That New Funkadelic" (2018)

"Arrest the President" is a political song by American rapper Ice Cube, released by Interscope Records on November 9, 2018. It is the lead single from Ice Cube's tenth studio album Everythang's Corrupt. Although he is not mentioned by name, it is directed at US President Donald Trump, containing a refrain to "Arrest the President; you got the evidence". The song's video is a montage of Trump clips.

== Background ==
The song was noted for its overtly political stance following Ice Cube previously having commented on his feeling that Trump has not acted on issues that affect the black community in the United States, and strongly denying on Twitter that he would ever support Trump.

== Lyrics ==
Along with lyrics about treating the White House like a "trap house" and that "These motherfuckers never take the trash out", Ice Cube refers to the accusations of Russian collusion in the 2016 election, calling Trump "Russian intelligence", with the song's refrain deemed a "plea" to Robert Mueller to arrest Trump.

== Critical reception ==
Along with being called politically charged by Rolling Stone and Pitchfork, NME called the song an "attack" on Trump, saying Ice Cube "couldn't be clearer" on its refrain.

== See also ==
- Russian interference in the 2016 United States elections
