= Cuts for Luck and Scars for Freedom =

Studio album by Mystic
- Released: July 31, 2001
- Recorded: 2000–01
- Genre: Conscious hip hop; R&B
- Length: 1:16:25
- Label: GoodVibe Recordings
- Producer: Adam; AmpLive; A-Plus; CD; Chops; Dotrix 4000; Manifest; Relative; Shock G; Spontaneous; The Angel; Walter Taylor

Mystic chronology
| Cuts for Luck and Scars for Freedom (2001) | Beautiful Resistance (2014) |

Singles from Cuts for Luck and Scars for Freedom
- 1. "The Life" Released: May 6, 2003

Professional ratings
Review scores
| Source | Rating |
|---|---|
| AllMusic | 4/5 stars |
| Entertainment Weekly | A |
| HipHopDX | 4.5/5 |
| RapReviews | 8.5/10 |
| The Village Voice | (choice cut) |

Cuts for Luck and Scars for Freedom is the debut studio album by American Oakland-based rapper and singer Mystic. It was released on July 31, 2001, through GoodVibe Recordings. Production was handled by Dotrix 4000, The Angel, CD, Chops, Relative, Spontaneous, Adam, AmpLive, A-Plus, Manifest, Shock G and Walter Taylor.

The album peaked at number 170 on the Billboard 200, number 46 on the Top R&B/Hip-Hop Albums and number 7 on the Heatseekers Albums in the United States. It elicited generally favourable reviews from music critics, who praised the album's lyrics and themes.

== Background ==
Before recording as a solo artist, Mystic toured with Digital Underground. She was then offered a record deal, but the same day she signed the contract, her father overdosed and died. She wrote the song "Fatherless Child" in memory of him.

== Writing and recording ==
Mystic wrote the song "Fatherless Child" about her childhood, growing up without a father. When recording the song in studio, she brought in his ashes and set them on a makeshift altar. She told Vibe in a 2003 interview that the reaction to the song was enormous, with teenagers e-mailing her to tell her about how distant their fathers were and the lengths some went to get their attention, going so far as to attempt suicide.

== Critical reception ==
The album was met with generally favourable reviews upon its release. Cheo Tyehimba of Entertainment Weekly awarded the album an "A" and called the songs "catchy but meaningful". HipHopDX reviewer gave the album 4.5 out of 5, noticing "the biggest complaint of this album will probably stem from the spoken word and slower final tracks". Steve 'Flash' Juon of RapReviews also praised the album, saying "not a single track could be called weak or musically unlistenable". AllMusic's Matt Conaway awarded the album 4 stars out of possible 5 and noted the album's diversity of musical styles, also praising her "socially relevant and personally revealing topic matter". Robert Christgau, in his Consumer Guide column for The Village Voice, highlighted the song "Ghetto Birds" as a "good song on an album that isn't worth your time or money".

== Release ==
The album was initially released by GoodVibe Records on July 31, 2001. the release was problematic, with distribution problems, but the rights to the album were acquired by DreamWorks Records. The label intended to re-release the album with five new songs, but Interscope Records consumed the label and all plans of re-releasing the album were shelved. On August 2, 2011, the album was re-released by Universal Music Group, to celebrate the album's tenth anniversary.

== Commercial performance ==
The album performed poorly in the United States, debuting at number 190, stalling out at number 170 on the Billboard 200 and failing to enter the top 40 of the Top R&B/Hip-Hop Albums chart, peaking at 46. However, lead single "The Life" proved a minor hit, spending three months on the Bubbling Under Hot R&B/Hip-Hop Singles chart, where it reached number 9. The album was more successful on some other charts, however. It peaked at number 3 on CMJ New Music Report's Hip-Hop airplay chart, and topped the Billboard's Pacific Heatseekers chart.

== Accolades ==
The album earned Mystic several accolades and award nominations. In 2001, Kludge magazine ranked it at number seven on their list of best albums of the year. In 2002, the album earned Mystic a nomination for "Best Female Hip-Hop Artist" at the BET Awards; she lost, however, to Missy Elliott. That same year, the album cut "W" was nominated for "Best Rap/Sung Collaboration", a new category, at the Grammy Awards; the song lost to Eve's "Let Me Blow Ya Mind", a collaboration with Gwen Stefani.

== Track listing ==
Songwriters credits are adapted from ASCAP.

Cuts for Luck and Scars for Freedom
| No. | Title | Writer(s) | Producer(s) | Length |
|---|---|---|---|---|
| 1. | "Intro" | Mandolyn Wind Ludlum; Gregory Edward Jacobs | Shock G | 1:00 |
| 2. | "Ghetto Birds" | Ludlum; Angel C | The Angel | 5:27 |
| 3. | "Neptune's Jewels" | Ludlum; A. Weisman; Anthony Cava; Jay Livingston; Ray Evans; Neal Hefti | Adam | 4:45 |
| 4. | "The Gottas" | Ludlum; Carl Gold | CD | 5:35 |
| 5. | "The Life" | Ludlum; Adam Carter | A-Plus | 3:48 |
| 6. | "Once a Week" | Ludlum; Gold | CD | 3:37 |
| 7. | "Dave Ghetto" | | Chops | 1:30 |
| 8. | "Forever and a Day" | Ludlum; Mark Vesuvio Guglielmo | Manifest | 4:38 |
| 9. | "D Boy" | Ludlum; Dontrell Lee Mayfield | Dotrix 4000 | 3:48 |
| 10. | "You Say, I Say" | Ludlum; Walter Ray Taylor | Walter Taylor | 4:51 |
| 11. | "A Dream" | Ludlum; Mayfield | Dotrix 4000 | 4:59 |
| 12. | "W" (featuring Planet Asia) | Ludlum; Jason C. Green; Matthew J. Lavella; Lawrence T. Palmer | Relative; Spontaneous | 4:31 |
| 13. | "Fallen Angels" | Ludlum; Mayfield | Dotrix 4000 | 5:38 |
| 14. | "Girlfriend Sistagirl" | Ludlum; Anthony W. Anderson | AmpLive | 3:57 |
| 15. | "Fatherless Child" | Ludlum; Scott Jung | Chops | 5:44 |
| 16. | "OK....Alright" | Ludlum; Angel C | The Angel | 4:34 |
| 17. | "Spoken Peace" | Ludlum; Lavella; Palmer | Relative; Spontaneous | 3:34 |
| 18. | "Destiny Complete" | Ludlum; Angel C | The Angel | 4:29 |
| Total length: | | | | 1:16:25 |

== Charts ==
| Chart (2001) | Peak position |
|---|---|
| US Billboard 200 | 170 |
| US Top R&B/Hip-Hop Albums (Billboard) | 46 |
| US Heatseekers Albums (Billboard) | 7 |
