= Good Cop, Bad Cop (song) =

Single by Ice Cube

from the album Death Certificate 25th Anniversary Edition and Everythang's Corrupt
- Released: June 6, 2017
- Recorded: 2017
- Genre: Gangsta rap; West Coast hip hop; political hip hop
- Length: 3:27
- Label: Lench Mob; Interscope
- Songwriter: O'Shea Jackson
- Producer: T-Mix

Ice Cube singles chronology
"Real People" (2016)	"Good Cop, Bad Cop" (2017)	"Arrest the President" (2018)

"Good Cop, Bad Cop" is a song by American rapper Ice Cube. It was released for digital download on June 6, 2017, as a single from Death Certificate 25th Anniversary Edition. It was also included in his tenth studio album Everythang's Corrupt, released in December 2018.

== Background ==
The hook of the song samples Ice Cube's verse from N.W.A's "Fuck tha Police". The song was released as a protest against corrupt law enforcements.

== Music video ==
A music video for the song was released on Ice Cube's Vevo account on June 9, 2017.

== Appearances in media ==
The song was prominently featured in the first official trailer for The Happytime Murders.
