= Neva Again =

Studio album by Kam
- Released: February 16, 1993
- Studio: Echo Sound (Atwater Village, CA); Paramount (Hollywood, CA)
- Genre: West Coast hip hop; political hip hop
- Length: 42:58
- Label: Street Knowledge; EastWest
- Producer: Eddie "Coze tha Grinch" Goodman; Stan "The Guitar Man" Jones; Stone tha Lunatic; Tootie; Mr. Woody; Rashad Coes; Solid Scheme; DJ Pooh; T-Bone

Kam chronology
Neva Again (1993)	Made in America (1995)

Singles from Neva Again
- 1. "Peace Treaty" Released: February 6, 1993

Neva Again is the debut studio album by West Coast hip hop musician Kam. It was released in 1993 via Street Knowledge Records and EastWest Records America. The recording sessions took place at Echo Sound and Paramount Studios, in Los Angeles. The album was produced by Torcha Chamba, Solid Scheme, Mr. Woody, T-Bone, Rashad Coes & DJ Pooh. Kam's cousin Ice Cube made his appearance on the album as executive producer and the only guest vocalist. The album peaked at number 110 on the Billboard 200 and at number 18 on the Top R&B/Hip-Hop Albums in the United States.

== Critical reception ==
Professional ratings
Review scores
Source	Rating
AllMusic	2.5/5 stars
RapReviews	10/10

The Washington Post noted that "the L.A. rapper drops more science about white supremacy, poverty and politics in one verse than many others drop in entire songs." The Richmond Times-Dispatch called Kam "a rapper with strong convictions and a keenly focused and uncompromising lyrical style."

== Track listing ==
No.	Title	Writer(s)	Producer(s)	Length
1.	"Intro"	E. Goodman; S. Jones; A. Trotter IV; J. Lars, Jr.	Coze; Stan "The Guitar Man" Jones; Stone Tha Lunatic; Toothie	1:15
2.	"Peace Treaty"	C. Miller	Chris Charity; Derek Lynch	4:18
3.	"Stereotype"	C. Miller; C. Bobbit; F. Wesley; J. Brown; J. Starks	Rashad Coes	4:30
4.	"Still Got Love 4 'Um"	C. Miller; A. Goodman; H. Ray; S. Robinson	T-Bone	4:23
5.	"Hang 'Um High"	C. Miller; E. Goodman; S. Jones; A. Trotter IV; J. Lars, Jr.	Coze; Stan "The Guitar Man" Jones; Stone Tha Lunatic; Toothie	3:41
6.	"Drama"	C. Miller; M. Gaye; B. Worrell; G. Clinton, Jr.; G. Itri; L. Graham	Mr. Woody	3:48
7.	"Neva Again"	C. Miller; B. Worrell; W. Collins; G. Clinton, Jr.; L. Troutman; R. Troutman	Rashad Coes	3:39
8.	"Y'all Don't Hear Me Dough"	C. Miller; G. Clinton, Jr.; R. Troutman; Mr. Woody	Mr. Woody	3:30
9.	"Ain't That a Bitch"	C. Miller	Chris Charity; Derek Lynch	3:29
10.	"Holiday Madness"	C. Miller; E. Goodman; S. Jones; A. Trotter IV; J. Lars, Jr.	Coze; Stan "The Guitar Man" Jones; Stone Tha Lunatic; Toothie	3:58
11.	"Watts Riot" (featuring Ice Cube)	C. Miller	DJ Pooh	4:06
12.	"Outro"	E. Goodman; S. Jones; A. Trotter IV; J. Lars, Jr.	Coze; Stan "The Guitar Man" Jones; Stone Tha Lunatic; Toothie	2:21
Total length:				42:58

Notes

- Track 3 contains a sample from "Papa Don't Take No Mess" by James Brown
- Track 4 contains a sample from "Sexy Mama" by the Moments
- Track 5 contains a sample from "Riding High" by Faze-O
- Track 6 contains samples from "Midnight Runaway" by Three Dog Night, "Trouble Man" by Marvin Gaye, "People" by Graham Central Station and "Cosmic Slop" by Funkadelic
- Track 7 contains samples from "Flashlight" by Parliament and "Heartbreaker" by Zapp
- Track 8 contains samples from "Atomic Dog" by George Clinton and "Play Some Blues" by Roger Troutman

== Personnel ==
- Craig A. Miller – main artist
- O'Shea Jackson – featured artist (track 11), executive producer
- Eddie "Coze tha Grinch" Goodman – producer (tracks: 1, 5, 10, 12)
- Stan "The Guitar Man" Jones – producer (tracks: 1, 5, 10, 12)
- Angelo Trotter IV – producer (tracks: 1, 5, 10, 12)
- Jesse D. Lars Jr. – producer (tracks: 1, 5, 10, 12)
- Chris Charity – producer (tracks: 2, 9)
- Derek Lynch – producer (tracks: 2, 9)
- James Rashad Coes – producer (tracks: 3, 7)
- Terry "T-Bone" Gray – producer (track 4)
- Mr. Woody – producer (tracks: 6, 8)
- Clarence "D.J. Train" Lars – scratches (track 5)
- Mark Jordan – scratches (track 8), producer (track 11)
- Brian Gallow – scratches (track 10)
- Anthony "Soup" Holmes – keyboards (track 10)
- Bob Morse – engineering
- Mike Calderon – engineering
- Tony Dawsey – mastering
- Melanie Nissen – art direction
- Richard Bates – design
- S. Sung Lee – assistant design
- Valerie Wagner – assistant design

== Charts ==
Chart (1993)	Peak position
US Billboard 200	110
US Top R&B/Hip-Hop Albums (Billboard)	18
