= Everythang's Corrupt =

Studio album by Ice Cube
- Released: December 7, 2018
- Studios: Lench Mob Studios (Los Angeles, CA)
- Genre: Hip-hop
- Length: 55:56
- Labels: Lench Mob; Interscope
- Producers: Ice Cube (exec.); DJ Pooh; Hallway Productionz; ShawnSki; Beau James; Big Soj; Sparkz Tha Trackman; Magnedo7; E-A-Ski; Fredwreck; T-Mix

Ice Cube chronology
I Am the West (2010)	Everythang's Corrupt (2018)	Snoop Cube 40 $hort (2022)

Singles from Everythang's Corrupt
- 1. "Everythang's Corrupt" Released: October 31, 2012; 2. "Good Cop, Bad Cop" Released: June 6, 2017; 3. "Arrest the President" Released: November 9, 2018; 4. "That New Funkadelic" Released: December 4, 2018

Everythang's Corrupt (stylized as Everythangs Corrupt) is the tenth studio album by American rapper Ice Cube, released on December 7, 2018, by Lench Mob and Interscope Records. It is his first studio album since 2010's I Am the West and was originally set for release in 2015. It features a sole appearance of Too Short.

== Singles ==
The album's first single, "Everythang's Corrupt", was released to YouTube on October 31, 2012, then to digital retailers as a single on January 1, 2013. The album's second single, "Arrest the President", was released on November 9, 2018. The third single, "That New Funkadelic", was released on December 4, 2018.

== Commercial performance ==
Everythang's Corrupt debuted at number 62 on the Billboard 200 with 14,000 album-equivalent units of which 8,000 were pure album sales.

== Critical reception ==
Professional ratings
Aggregate scores
Source	Rating
Metacritic	79/100
Review scores
Source	Rating
Consequence of Sound	B+
Exclaim!	8/10
HipHopDX	3.6/5
RapReviews	7/10
XXL	(L) 3/5

The album received generally positive reviews, with critics praising Ice Cube's lyrical delivery. At Metacritic, which assigns a normalized rating out of 100 to reviews from mainstream publications, the album received an average score of 79, based on 5 reviews. Michael Pementel of Consequence of Sound said, "Cube still embarks with this same purpose, and the effort proves to be one of the best albums in the latter half of his career". Kyle Mullin of Exclaim! praised the album stating, "Cube's vigorous delivery puts the album over, along with his willingness to adopt flows you wouldn't expect from an MC so long in the tooth".

== Track listing ==
Credits adapted from Tidal.

All tracks are written by O'Shea Jackson Sr.

No.	Title	Producer(s)	Length
1.	"Super OG" (Intro)	Hallway Productionz	0:37
2.	"Arrest the President"	ShawnSki	3:53
3.	"Chase Down the Bully"	Beau James	4:06
4.	"Don't Bring Me No Bag"	ShawnSki	3:37
5.	"Bad Dope"	Big Soj	3:22
6.	"On Them Pills"	Sparkz Tha Trackman	3:58
7.	"Fire Water"	Big Soj	4:21
8.	"Streets Shed Tears" (featuring Shameia Crawford)	Magnedo7	4:01
9.	"Ain't Got No Haters" (featuring Too $hort)	DJ Pooh	3:26
10.	"Can You Dig It?"	Hallway Productionz	4:22
11.	"That New Funkadelic"	T-Mix	3:54
12.	"One for the Money"	Magnedo7	2:21
13.	"Still in the Kitchen"	E-A-Ski	3:25
14.	"Non Believers"	Hallway Productionz	3:47
15.	"Everythang's Corrupt"	Fredwreck	3:17
16.	"Good Cop, Bad Cop"	T-Mix	3:28
Total length:			55:56

In addition, "Sic Them Youngins on 'Em" and "Drop Girl" (both released in 2014) were originally planned to appear on the album, but this was abandoned when its release date was changed from 2015 to 2018.

== Charts ==
Chart (2018)	Peak position
Australian Albums (ARIA)	56
Belgian Albums (Ultratop Flanders)	127
Canadian Albums (Billboard)	39
Dutch Albums (Album Top 100)	85
Swiss Albums (Schweizer Hitparade)	63
US Billboard 200	62
US Top R&B/Hip-Hop Albums (Billboard)	27
