= Made in America (Kam album) =

Studio album by Kam
- Released: March 14, 1995
- Genre: West Coast hip hop; gangsta rap; G-funk
- Length: 49:43
- Label: East West America; Elektra
- Producer: DJ Battlecat; DJ Quik; Cold 187um; E-A-Ski; Warren G; Chris "The Glove" Taylor

Kam chronology
Neva Again (1993)	Made in America (1995)	Kamnesia (2001)

Professional ratings
Review scores
Source	Rating
AllMusic	3/5 stars
Robert Christgau	(dud)
Q	3/5 stars
RapReviews.com	8.0/10
The Source	3.5/5 stars
Vibe	favorable

Made in America is the second album released by Kam. It was released on March 14, 1995 for East West Records and was produced by DJ Battlecat, DJ Quik, E-A-Ski, Warren G and Cold 187um, among others. Made in America was a modest success, peaking at #158 on the Billboard 200, #20 on the Top R&B/Hip-Hop Albums and #8 on the Top Heatseekers. This was Kam's last album for East West Records.

== Track listing ==
No.	Title	Producer(s)	Length
1.	"Intro"	Jessie "Big Jess" Willard	2:21
2.	"Trust Nobody"	Battlecat	4:26
3.	"Pull Ya Hoe Card"	E-A-Ski & CMT	4:22
4.	"That's My Nigga"	DJ Quik	4:09
5.	"Way A Life"	Battlecat	4:23
6.	"Down Fa Mine" (featuring Dresta & MC Ren)	Jessie "Big Jessie" Willard	5:28
7.	"In Traffic"	Battlecat	3:58
8.	"Givin' It Up"	Cold 187um	3:39
9.	"Nut'n Nice"	Mad Scientists & Rashad	3:39
10.	"Who Ridin'"	E-A-Ski & CMT, Chris "The Glove" Taylor	3:49
11.	"Keep Tha Peace"	Warren G, Kam (co-prod.)	4:53
12.	"Represent" (featuring D-Dope, K-Mac & Solo)	Jessie "Big Jessie" Willard	4:14
Total length:			49:43

== Charts ==
Chart	Peak position
US Billboard 200	158
US Top R&B/Hip-Hop Albums (Billboard)	20
US Heatseekers Albums (Billboard)	8
