= Toddy Tee =

American rapper

Todd Howard, known professionally as Toddy Tee, is an American rapper based in Los Angeles. He is best known for his 1985 protest song "Batterram", which protested against police brutality by the Los Angeles Police Department. He was an influence for prominent Los Angeles-based musicians such as Ice-T and King T, and the N.W.A hip hop group.

Howard first gained notoriety in Compton, California producing parody raps. He was first signed to Evejim Records. His song “Batteram” is described by Rolling Stone as an "underground success", and was named by the magazine as one of "The 100 Greatest West Coast Hip-Hop Songs of All Time."
