= Kamnesia =

Studio album by Kam
- Released: March 20, 2001
- Recorded: 2000
- Studio: Record Plant (Los Angeles, CA); Skip Saylor Recording (Los Angeles, CA); Echo Sound Studio (Los Feliz, CA); Lithium Studio (Ventura, CA); The Co-Stars Spot (Hollywood, CA)
- Genre: Hip-hop
- Length: 54:23
- Label: Hard Tyme; JCOR; Interscope
- Producer: DJ Pooh; DJ Wino; Doug Rasheed; Jazze Pha; Jimmy 'Klev' Juarez; Kip Collins; The Co-Stars

Kam chronology
Made In America (1995)	Kamnesia (2001)

Professional ratings
Review scores
Source	Rating
AllMusic	3/5 stars
HipHopDX	3/5
Los Angeles Times	3/4 stars
RapReviews	7/10
The Source	3.5/5 stars
XXL	M (2/5)

Kamnesia is the third studio album by American rapper Kam. It was released on March 20, 2001, via Hard Tyme Records/JCOR Entertainment. Recording sessions took place at the Record Plant and Skip Saylor Recording in Los Angeles, Echo Sound Studio in Los Feliz, Lithium Studio in Ventura and the Co-Stars Spot in Hollywood. Production was handled by DJ Pooh, DJ Wino, Doug Rasheed, Jazze Pha, Jimmy 'Klev' Juarez, Kip Collins and the Co-Stars. It features guest appearances from Big Solo, Mystic, Dresta, Jayo Felony, Jazze Pha, Ms. Red Bone, Spade, Spider Loc and Yukmouth.

In the United States, the album debuted at number 69 on the Top R&B/Hip-Hop Albums and number 40 on the Heatseekers Albums charts.

== Track listing ==
No.	Title	Producer(s)	Length
1.	"Kamnesia"	Jazze Pha	4:43
2.	"Have a Fit" (featuring Big Solo and Ms. Red Bone)	Klev	4:11
3.	"Where I Come From" (featuring Big Solo)	DJ Pooh	3:42
4.	"Benefits"	Kip Collins	3:40
5.	"Bounce Trick" (featuring Jazze Pha)	Jazze Pha	4:22
6.	"Bang Bang" (featuring Mystic)	Wino; Kam (co.); Tee Kapeez (co.)	4:05
7.	"They Like Dat" (featuring Spider Loc, Dresta, Jayo Felony and Yukmouth)	Wino	4:08
8.	"Let's Hook Up"	Jazze Pha	4:15
9.	"What I Look Like" (featuring Mystic)	Wino	3:26
10.	"Giddie Up"	Co-Stars	3:54
11.	"The Godbrotha Intro"	Klev	1:49
12.	"Godbrotha"	Klev	4:13
13.	"Active" (featuring Spade)	Wino	3:37
14.	"Wardance"	Doug Rasheed	4:18
Total length:			54:23

== Charts ==
Chart (2001)	Peak position
US Top R&B/Hip-Hop Albums (Billboard)	69
US Heatseekers Albums (Billboard)	40
