= Steady Mobbin' =

Single by Ice Cube

from the album Death Certificate
- B-side: "No Vaseline"
- Released: August 9, 1991
- Recorded: 1991
- Studio: Paramount Recording Studios (Los Angeles, California)
- Genre: Gangsta rap; West Coast hip hop
- Length: 4:13
- Label: Priority
- Songwriter: O'Shea Jackson
- Producers: Ice Cube; The Boogie Men

Ice Cube singles chronology
"AmeriKKKa's Most Wanted" (1990)	"Steady Mobbin'" (1991)	"True to the Game" (1992)

Music video
- "Steady Mobbin'" on YouTube

"Steady Mobbin'" is a song recorded by Ice Cube and it was released as the first single from his second album Death Certificate.

The single contains the b-side, No Vaseline, which is a diss track towards N.W.A.

== Samples ==
The song contains samples of "Reach Out" by Average White Band; "Love Amnesia" by Parlet; and "Dr. Funkenstein" and "Sir Nose d'Voidoffunk (Pay Attention – B3M)" by Parliament.

== Charts ==
Chart (1991)	Peak position
Australia (ARIA)	147
UK Club Chart (Music Week)	56
US Hot Rap Songs (Billboard)	3
US Hot R&B/Hip-Hop Songs (Billboard)	30
