= Jazzie Collins =

American trans woman activist and community organizer

- Born: September 24, 1958; Memphis, Tennessee, U.S.
- Died: July 11, 2013 (aged 54); San Francisco, California, U.S.
- Occupation: Activist
- Known for: Transgender and economic inequality activism

Jazzie Collins (September 24, 1958 – July 11, 2013) was an African American trans woman activist and community organizer for transgender rights, disability rights, and economic equality in San Francisco. Her activism spanned a decade and a wide variety of community organizations, boards, and initiatives focusing on fighting for the rights of minority communities.

== Personal life ==
Collins was born to a teenage mother in Memphis, Tennessee on September 24, 1958. She was born into a strict Baptist family and experienced abuse in foster care. She graduated from Job Corps and later worked as a construction worker and as a hospital orderly.

She moved to San Francisco in 1988 and transitioned a few years later, in her late 40s. Collins was open about being HIV-positive.

== Activism work ==
Collins was active in San Francisco activism in multiple overlapping areas, including tenants' rights, labor rights, transgender rights, and aging and health issues. She began her activist work in earnest in 2002, challenging development plans at the Plaza Hotel on Sixth Street.

Collins served as the vice chair of San Francisco's LGBT Aging Policy Taskforce and as the vice chair of the Lesbian Gay Transgender Senior Disabled Housing Task Force. She was a community organizer for Senior and Disability Action, an organization dedicated to defending the rights of seniors and disabled people. She ran the "6th Street Agenda" food pantry and was one of the founders of Queers for Economic Equality Now (QUEEN).

In 2003, she was a member of the Prop L Committee, successfully directing efforts to raise the minimum wage in San Francisco. Collins also helped organize tenant action for the Tenderloin Housing Clinic.

For five years Collins served on the board of directors of the San Francisco Trans March, an annual gathering and protest march.

== Legacy ==
In June 2013, Collins was honored on the floor of the California state capitol by the Legislative Lesbian, Gay, Bisexual and Transgender Caucus for her advocacy work for justice and equality.

Collins died in San Francisco on July 11, 2013. She was remembered by one of the organizations she was dedicated to, Senior and Disability Action, as "fearless, inspiring, loving," and as a "beloved fighter".

The first homeless shelter in the United States for the adult LGBTQ community was opened in 2015 and named Jazzie's Place in honor of Collins. The shelter, located in San Francisco's Mission District, is operated by Dolores Street Community Services and is intended to serve as a safe haven for the homeless LGBTQ population, who are at a greater risk of violence and abuse.
