= Bad Newz Travels Fast =

Studio album by DJ Pooh
- Released: July 15, 1997
- Recorded: 1994, 1997
- Studio: Digital Shack Studios (Sherman Oaks, CA); The G-Spot Studio (El Monte, CA)
- Genre: West Coast hip-hop; gangsta rap; g-funk
- Label: Big Beat; Atlantic
- Producer: DJ Pooh; Rashad Coes; Stealth; Tony G.

Singles from Bad Newz Travels Fast
- 1. "Nowhere to Hide" Released: May 15, 1995; 2. "Whoop! Whoop!" Released: 1997

Professional ratings
Review scores
Source	Rating
AllMusic	3/5 stars

Bad Newz Travels Fast is the only studio album by American rapper and record producer DJ Pooh. It was released July 15, 1997, through Big Beat/Atlantic Records. Recording sessions took place at Digital Shack Studios in Sherman Oaks and at the G-Spot Studio in El Monte, California. Production was handled by DJ Pooh himself, who also served as executive producer, with Rashad Coes, Stealth and Tony G. It features guest appearances from Threat, Mista Grimm, Kam, Bad Azz, Big Tray Deee, Charlie Wilson, Roger Troutman, Tha Low Life Gangstas and Tee Lee. The album peaked at number 116 on the Billboard 200 and number 34 on the Top R&B Albums charts in the United States. The album spawned two singles: "Nowhere to Hide" and "Whoop! Whoop!", with the latter made it to number 73 on the US R&B airplay charts.

== Track listing ==
No.	Title	Writer(s)	Producer(s)	Length
1.	"Intro"
2.	"Bump Yo Speakers" (featuring Threat)	Mark Jordan; Corey Lloyd	DJ Pooh
3.	"No Idea" (featuring Kam, Charlie Wilson and Roger Troutman)	Jordan; Craig Miller; Charlie Wilson; Roger Troutman; Shirley Murdock; Rashad Coes	DJ Pooh; Rashad Coes
4.	"Grow Room" (featuring Mista Grimm)	Jordan; Rojai Trawick	DJ Pooh
5.	"Whoop! Whoop!" (featuring Kam)	Miller; Trevor Horn; Malcolm McLaren	Tony G
6.	"Get Money" (featuring Threat and Tray D)	Jordan; Lloyd; Tracy Davis	DJ Pooh
7.	"New World Order" (featuring Tha Low Life Gangstas and Bad Ass)	Jordan; Eric Delahoussaye; Erayn Walker; Jamarr Terry; K. Willis; Jamarr Stamps	DJ Pooh
8.	"Bad Newz Travels Fast" (featuring T-Lee)	Jordan; T. Mosley; Gerald Elliot Thomas	DJ Pooh
9.	"Ebonics" (featuring Mista Grimm)	Jordan; Trawick	DJ Pooh
10.	"Get Off" (featuring Threat)	Jordan; Lloyd	DJ Pooh
11.	"Who Cares" (featuring Kam)	Miller; Gordon McGinnis	Stealth
12.	"MC's Must Come Down" (featuring Mista Grimm)	Jordan; Trawick	DJ Pooh
13.	"No Where 2 Hide" (featuring Threat)	Jordan; Lloyd	DJ Pooh
14.	"You Ain't Shit" (featuring Mista Grimm)	Jordan; Trawick	DJ Pooh
15.	"Gangsta Vocabulary" (featuring Threat)	Jordan; Lloyd; Joseph Williams; Lawrence Parker	DJ Pooh

Sample credits

- Track 2 contains a sample from "You Gots to Chill" written by Erick Sermon and Parrish Smith as recorded by EPMD.
- Trak 4 contains samples from "Slow Down" written by Kenny Withrow, Edie Brickell, John Bush, Lorenzo Dechalus, Derek Murphy, Maxwell Dixon, John Bradley Houser and Brandon Aly as recorded by Brand Nubian, and "Just Say No" written and recorded by Todd "Toddy Tee" Howard.
- Track 5 contains samples from "She's Looking Like a Hobo" written by Trevor Horn and Malcolm McLaren as recorded by Malcolm McLaren, and "Buffalo Gals" written by Anne Dudley, Trevor Horn and Malcolm McLaren as recorded by Malcolm McLaren.
- Track 7 contains a sample from "Mona Lisa" written by Ricky Walters as recorded by Slick Rick.
- Track 8 contains a sample from "Is This the Future" written by Gerry Thomas as recorded by Fatback Band.
- Track 12 contains a sample from "A One Two" written by Marcel Hall and Marlon Williams as recorded by Biz Markie.
- Track 15 contains a sample from "The Original Gangster of Hip Hop" written by Joseph Williams and Lawrence Parker as recorded by Just-Ice and KRS-One.

== Personnel ==
- Mark "DJ Pooh" Jordan – vocals, producer (tracks: 2–4, 6–10, 12–15), mixing, mastering, executive producer
- Corey "Threat" Lloyd – vocals (tracks: 2, 6, 10, 13, 15)
- Craig "Kam" Miller – vocals (tracks: 3, 5, 11)
- Charlie Wilson – vocals (track 3), backing vocals (tracks: 2, 6, 10)
- Roger Troutman – vocals (track 3)
- Rojai "Mista Grimm" Trawick – vocals (tracks: 4, 9, 12, 14)
- Tracy "Big Tray Deee" Davis – vocals (track 6), backing vocals (track 15)
- Eric "Coco Loc" Delahoussaye – vocals (track 7)
- Erayn Walker – vocals (track 7)
- Jamarr "Lil J" Terry – vocals (track 7)
- K. Willis – vocals (track 7)
- Jamarr "Bad Azz" Stamps – vocals (track 7)
- T. "Tee Lee" Mosley – vocals (track 8)
- Shirley Murdock – backing vocals (track 3)
- Yolanda Harris – backing vocals (tracks: 3, 6)
- Tremayne Glaster – backing vocals (track 11)
- Valaria "Val" Young – backing vocals (track 13)
- Nancy Fletcher – backing vocals (track 14)
- Rashad Coes – producer (track 3)
- Antonio "Tony G" Gonzalez – producer (track 5)
- Gordon "DJ Stealth" McGinnis Jr. – producer (track 11)
- Rick Freeman – engineering (tracks: 1–4, 6–10, 12–15), project coordinator
- Tom Baker – engineering (tracks: 5, 11)
- Brett Jordan – project coordinator
- Larry T. West – project coordinator
- Jason Clark – art direction, design
- Ken Hollis – photography

== Charts ==
Chart (1997)	Peak position
US Billboard 200	116
US Top R&B/Hip-Hop Albums (Billboard)	34
