= At Your Own Risk =

1990 studio album by King Tee

Studio album by King Tee
- Released: September 24, 1990
- Recorded: 1990
- Studios: Milagro Sound Recorders (Glendale, California)
- Genre: West Coast hip hop
- Length: 48:16
- Label: Capitol
- Producers: DJ Pooh; King Tee; Bilal Bashir; J.R. Coes; Bronick Wrobleski; E-Swift; DJ Aladdin

King Tee chronology
Act a Fool (1988)	At Your Own Risk (1990)	Tha Triflin' Album (1993)

Singles from At Your Own Risk
- 1. "Ruff Rhyme (Back Again)" Released: 1990; 2. "At Your Own Risk" Released: 1990; 3. "Diss You" Released: 1990; 4. "Played Like a Piano" Released: 1990

Professional ratings
Review scores
Source	Rating
AllMusic	4.5/5 stars

At Your Own Risk is the second studio album by American West Coast hip hop artist King Tee. It was released on September 24, 1990, via Capitol Records. The album was produced by DJ Pooh, E-Swift, Bilal Bashir, Bronick Wrobleski, J.R. Coes, DJ Aladdin, and King T. It features guest appearances from Ice Cube and Breeze on the album's final track, "Played Like a Piano". The album spawned four singles: "Ruff Rhyme (Back Again)", "Diss You", "At Your Own Risk" and "Played Like a Piano", which were later included on the rapper's greatest hits album titled Ruff Rhymes: Greatest Hits Collection.

The album peaked at number 175 on the US Billboard 200 and number 35 on the Top R&B/Hip-Hop Albums. Its single "Ruff Rhyme (Back Again)" peaked at number 18 on the Hot Rap Songs.

== Track listing ==
No.	Title	Producer(s)	Length
1.	"Introduction"	King Tee; Bilal Bashir	2:25
2.	"At Your Own Risk"	King Tee; DJ Pooh	4:06
3.	"Ruff Rhyme (Back Again)"	DJ Pooh	3:31
4.	"On the Dance Tip"	Bronick Wrobleski; J.R. Coes; DJ Pooh (co.)	4:07
5.	"Jay Fay Dray"	DJ Pooh	1:06
6.	"Skanless"	DJ Pooh	4:20
7.	"Take You Home"	DJ Pooh; J.R. Coes (co.)	4:20
8.	"Diss You"	Bilal Bashir	4:15
9.	"Time to Get Out"	DJ Pooh	3:29
10.	"Can This Be Real" (Remix)	DJ Pooh	3:45
11.	"E Get Swift"	DJ Pooh; E-Swift	3:50
12.	"Do Your Thing"	DJ Pooh	1:38
13.	"King Tee Production"	DJ Pooh; King Tee	2:34
14.	"Played Like a Piano" (featuring Ice Cube & Breeze)	DJ Pooh	4:59
Total length:			48:16

== Personnel ==
- Roger McBride – main artist, producer (tracks: 1, 2, 13), mixing (tracks: 1, 2, 8, 10)
- O'Shea Jackson – featured artist (track 14)
- M.C. Breeze – featured artist (track 14)
- Mark S. Jordan – producer (tracks: 2, 3, 5–7, 9–14), co-producer (track 4), mixing (tracks: 3–7, 9–14)
- Bilal Bashir – producer (tracks: 1, 8)
- J.R. Coes – producer (track 4), co-producer (track 7)
- Bronek Wroblewski – producer (track 4)
- Eric Brooks – producer (track 11)
- Bob Morse – engineering (tracks: 1, 3–7, 9–14)
- Vachik Aghaniantz – engineering (tracks: 2, 8)
- Alphonso Henderson – mixing (track 10)
- Glen E. Friedman – photography

== Album singles ==
Single information
"Ruff Rhyme"
- Released: June 29, 1990
- B-side:
"Diss You"
- Released: October 25, 1990
- B-side:
"At Your Own Risk"
- Released: March 25, 1991
- B-side:

== Chart positions ==
Album

Chart (1990)	Peak position
US Billboard 200	175
US Top R&B/Hip-Hop Albums (Billboard)	35

Singles

Year	Song	Hot Rap Singles
1990	"Ruff Rhyme (Back Again)"	18
