= No Vaseline =

Song by Ice Cube

from the album Death Certificate
- Released: October 29, 1991
- Recorded: 1991
- Genre: West Coast hip hop; hardcore hip hop; G-funk
- Length: 5:13 (album version); 4:05 (edited version)
- Label: Lench Mob; Priority
- Songwriter: O'Shea Jackson
- Producers: Ice Cube; Sir Jinx

"No Vaseline" is a diss track written and recorded by American rapper Ice Cube. It was released on October 31, 1991, through Lench Mob Records and Priority Records, amidst his feud with his former group N.W.A. The song serves as the twentieth song on Cube's Death Certificate (1991). It is Cube's response to several diss tracks N.W.A. released after his departure from the group.

Produced by Ice Cube himself and Sir Jinx, with samples from Brick's "Dazz" and The Gap Band's "Humpin'", "No Vaseline" is a West Coast hip hop track characterized by its aggressive delivery and raw, unapologetic lyrics. The track accused N.W.A. members, particularly Eazy-E and their manager Jerry Heller, of exploiting Cube and the group for financial gain. Cube also ridiculed Dr. Dre, MC Ren, and DJ Yella, stating that they had sold out to the industry's corporate interests.

"No Vaseline" was met with widespread acclaim from music critics, who praised it for its sharp lyricism and viciousness. The UK release of Death Certificate omitted this song, along with the 46-second long "Black Korea".

== Background ==
Ice Cube recorded this song in response to the comments N.W.A made towards him in their albums 100 Miles and Runnin' and Niggaz4Life. He had made some brief disses to N.W.A. in the Kill at Will EP, mocking the phrase "hundred miles and running" on "Jackin' for Beats" and ending "I Gotta Say What Up!!!" with an answer-phone message asking what had happened to the other members of the group, which leads to Ice Cube hanging up on the caller.

The first minute of the song is a reference to N.W.A's "Message to B.A.", in which they call Ice Cube "Benedict Arnold" as well as an "Ice-T wannabe". Ice Cube then begins his full-blown diss on the group and their manager, Jerry Heller.

Ice Cube addresses Eazy-E and Heller, employing particularly harsh words to criticize Eazy's decision to align himself with Heller: "Heard you both got the same bank account / Dumb nigga, What you thinkin' 'bout?" He accuses both Eazy-E and Heller of unfairly exploiting the rest of the group: "You little maggot, Eazy E turned faggot / With your manager, fella -- fuckin' MC Ren, Dr. Dre, and Yella" and "It's a case of divide and conquer, 'cause you let a Jew break up my crew", and, finally, he claims that this alliance has reduced Eazy's credibility: "house nigga gotta run and hide, yellin' Compton but you moved to Riverside".

Heller is not simply dissed as being a bad manager; he is given an antisemitic death-threat: "Get rid of that Devil real simple / Put a bullet in his temple / 'Cause you can't be the Nigga 4 Life crew / With a white Jew telling you what to do / Pulling wools with your scams / Now I gotta play Silence of the Lambs."

Politically, Ice Cube also references Eazy's appearance at a lunch benefiting the Republican Senatorial inner circle, hosted by then-President George H. W. Bush, repeatedly saying, "I never have dinner with the President."

The song appears on the Death Row Greatest Hits compilation album. Although the song was not released on Death Row Records (as Ice Cube was never signed to the label), it is believed that Suge Knight included it as an act of animosity towards Dr. Dre as the song includes numerous disses towards him. "No Vaseline" was track number 20 in the track listing of Death Certificate and was the B-side for the album single "Steady Mobbin'".

== Aftermath ==
N.W.A never responded to the song as a group. Not long after the release, Dr. Dre left the group, citing lack of monetary compensation. This led to N.W.A's dissolution as its members went on to start their solo careers.

In 1992, the implied death threat against Heller led Rabbi Abraham Cooper of the Los Angeles Jewish human rights organization, the Simon Wiesenthal Center, to observe, "We're not asking Ice Cube to mask the reality of the streets. By all means flag the social problems, but don't exploit them by turning a professional spat between a former manager and an artist into a racial dispute." "It's wrong for the rabbi to call me anti-Semitic," Cube responded. "I respect Jewish people because they're unified. I wish black people were as unified."

In 1993, Dr. Dre and his protégé Snoop Dogg dissed Eazy-E in the song "Fuck wit Dre Day (and Everybody's Celebratin')", the second single from his debut solo album, The Chronic and also referenced Heller in the video, prompting Eazy-E to respond that same year with "Real Muthaphuckkin G's."

In 2006, Jerry Heller's book Ruthless: A Memoir, written with Gil Reavill, was published by Simon & Schuster/Simon Spotlight Entertainment. In it, Heller mentioned the song "No Vaseline" and wrote that he did not believe that Ice Cube was genuinely antisemitic, but that he had exploited prejudices in the African-American community to further his career.

According to a 2013 interview with Ice Cube, when Eazy-E was close to death in 1995 from AIDS, Cube went to visit him in the hospital, Dre was walking out and told him that Eazy was unconscious. Cube left the hospital without seeing Eazy and told Dre to call him when he woke up. Dre later called Cube and told him that Eazy had died.

In 2022, Kanye West stated in an interview that Ice Cube's lyrics had "really influenced" him to "get on this antisemite vibe", during his infamous outburst through a series of tweets. Ice Cube responded by distancing himself from Ye's antisemitic remarks, tweeting, "I don't know what Ye meant by his statements, you're gonna have to ask him. I didn't put the batteries in his back. Please leave my name out of all the antisemitic talk. I'm not antisemitic and never have been."

== Certifications ==
Region	Certification	Certified units/sales
New Zealand (RMNZ)	Platinum	30,000^{‡}
United Kingdom (BPI)	Silver	200,000^{‡}
^{‡} Sales+streaming figures based on certification alone.

== Samples ==
- "Dazz" by Brick
- "Vapors" by Biz Markie
- "Atomic Dog" by George Clinton
- "Hit by a Car" by Eddie Murphy
- "Turn Off the Radio" and "Better Off Dead" by Ice Cube
- "It's My Thing" by Marva Whitney
- "Dope Man", "8 Ball", "A Bitch Iz a Bitch", "Message to B.A." and "Prelude" by N.W.A
- "Ball of Confusion (That's What the World Is Today)" by The Temptations
- "To da Break of Dawn" by LL Cool J

== See also ==
- List of notable diss tracks
