= Kam (rapper) =

American rapper (born 1969)

- Born: Craig Antoine Miller; October 24, 1969 (age 57); Willowbrook, California, U.S.
- Origin: Los Angeles, California, U.S.
- Genres: Hip-hop; West Coast hip-hop; gangsta rap; G-funk; underground hip-hop
- Occupation: Rapper
- Years active: 1989–present
- Labels: Street Knowledge; East West America; Atlantic; JCOR; Interscope; Lench Mob Records; Universal

Craig Antoine Miller (born October 24, 1969), better known by his stage name Kam, is an American rapper known primarily among hip-hop fans and music critics during the 1990s and early 2000s.

== Career ==
Kam has released two albums since his well-received 1993 debut album Neva Again. That album featured inflammatory anti-government lyrics and hit single "Peace Treaty," a song about the 1992 Watts gang treaty. The song reached No. 2 on the Hot Rap Singles chart in 1993.

His first appearance on record was with the song "Every Single Weekend" from the 1991 Boyz n the Hood soundtrack. Since then, he has collaborated with artists including Ice Cube, Snoop Dogg, Coolio, E-40, Erick Sermon, MC Ren, C-Bo, DJ Quik, DJ Pooh, Tha Eastsidaz, Method Man, KRS-One, Public Enemy, Brotha Lynch Hung, Solo, Nate Dogg, Warren G, Paris, Tha Dogg Pound, Xzibit, Tyrese, Tank, George Clinton, Dresta, B.G. Knocc Out, Yukmouth, Afroman, and Glasses Malone among many others. He has released music on two record labels, East West Records and JCOR Entertainment. He is currently signed to his own record label, Hereafter Redcords, and plans to release his fourth solo album. He is also currently a member of Snoop Dogg's West Coast supergroup The Warzone with MC Eiht and Goldie Loc. Kam and his biological younger brother, "Yung Bruh", are also a NOI-based rap group called, Fruit Pruno. Their self-titled album was released during the NOI's Saviour's Day 2010 summit (specifically on February 28, 2010).

== Discography ==
=== Studio albums ===
- Neva Again (1993)
- Made in America (1995)
- Kamnesia (2001)
- Mutual Respect (2016)
- 2020 God Vision (2020)

=== Collaboration albums ===
- Fruit Pruno with Fruit Pruno (2009)
- Fruit Pruno 2 with Fruit Pruno (2016)

=== Singles ===
- "Peace Treaty"/"Still Got Love 4 'Um" (1993)
- "Pull Ya Hoe Card"/"In Traffic"(1995)
- "Whoop! Whoop!" (Ice Cube Diss, 1997)
- "I Don't Think So" (2005) (Produced by Focus)

==== As featured artist ====
List of singles as featured artist, with other performing artists and selected chart positions, showing year released and album name
Title	Year	Peak chart positions	Album
Title	Year	US R&B	Album
"Paint the White House Black" (George Clinton featuring Ice Cube, Dr. Dre, Pupa Curley, Public Enemy, Yo-Yo, MC Breed and Kam)	1993	62	Hey, Man, Smell My Finger
"Exercise Yo' Game" (Coolio featuring E-40, Kam and 40 Thevz)	1995	—	Gangsta's Paradise
"Ghetto" (Tha Eastsidaz featuring Kokane, Nate Dogg and Kam)	2000	—	Tha Eastsidaz
"The Life (Remix)" (Mystic featuring Kam and Talib Kweli)	2001	—	Mystic
"Westside Driveby" (DJ Kayslay featuring E-A-Ski, MC Ren and Kam)	2003	—	The Streetsweeper, Vol. 1
"—" denotes a recording that did not chart.

===== Promotional singles =====
List of promotional singles as featured artist, with other performing artists, showing year released and album name
Title	Year	Album
"Whoop! Whoop!" (DJ Pooh featuring Kam)	1997	Bad Newz Travels Fast
"It's About Time (Remix)" (L.A. Nash featuring Jewell, Gonzoe and Kam)	1997	Make Me or Break Me
"Watch How Daddy Ball" (Saafir featuring Chameleon and Kam)	1999	The Hit List
"—" denotes a recording that did not chart.

=== Other songs ===
- "The New Message" feat Akon
- "Keep My Name Out Yo Mouth" feat The Game and Yung Bruh
- " Say it Loud" Feat WC Boo-Yaa T.R.I.B.E. Tank produced by Hakeem Khaaliq and the Radio Bums

=== Guest appearances ===
List of non-single guest appearances, with other performing artists, showing year released and album name
Title	Year	Other artist(s)	Album
"Every Single Weekend"	1991	None	Boyz n the Hood soundtrack
"Color Blind"	1991	Ice Cube, Threat, WC, Coolio, King T, J-Dee	Death Certificate
"The Ill Shit"	1993	Erick Sermon, Ice Cube	No Pressure
"Shock of the Hour"	1993	MC Ren, Laywiy	Shock of the Hour
"Keep tha 'P' in It"	1995	DJ Quik, Playa Hamm, 2-Tone, Hi-C, 2nd II None, General Jeff	Safe + Sound
"Pump Ya Fist"	1995	None	Pump Ya Fist: Hip Hop Inspired by the Black Panthers
"Throw Your Hands Up (Kam Version)"	1995	L.V.	Throw Your Hands Up single
"No Idea"	1997	DJ Pooh, Charlie Wilson, Roger Troutman, Shirley Murdock, Yolanda Harris	Bad Newz Travels Fast
"Who Cares"	1997	DJ Pooh	Bad Newz Travels Fast
"Mob On"	1998	Paris	Unleashed
"Westside Part III (Bud'da Remix)"	1998	TQ, Jayo Felony	Westside single
"My Name in Yo Mouth"	1998	Jayo Felony, Money Green	S.I. Riders
"Pounds on It"	1999	D.B.A., CJ Mac	Doing Business as
"Be Thankful"	2000	Tha Eastsidaz, Warren G, Pretty Tony	Tha Eastsidaz
"The Re-birth"	2000	Mausberg	The Konnectid Project, Vol. 1
"Get It Together (Million Family March Anthem)"	2000	The Lady of Rage, Caviar, Mack 10, Fat Joe, Drag-On, Sincere, Snoop Dogg	Million Family March
"Word Is Bond"	2000	None	Million Family March
"Get Props"	2001	Contraversy	Inner Conflicts
"Gangsta (Fuck a Ho)"	2001	Brotha Lynch Hung & C-Bo	Blocc Movement
"Doin' It on the Coast"	2002	Foesum	The Foefathers
"Eastside Stories"	2002	Foesum, Tripp Locc	The Foefathers
"Cali Ways"	2003	Down, Fingazz, Suga Free	California Cowboys
"Ain't No Love"	2003	Paris	Sonic Jihad
"Don't Do the Crime"	2003	Caviar, Above the Law	True Crime: Streets of LA soundtrack
"In the Middle of the Night"	2005	E-White, Julio G, MNMsta	48 Hours: The White Album
"West Coast Ridin'"	2005	Young Lyfe, Howard Hewett, Black Chill	Real Lyfe
"Till the Wheelz Fall Off"	2005	Foesum	U Heard of Us
"Evil Eastsyde"	2006	Spider Loc, Glasses Malone	Brainless, Vol. 2
"Pop Pop Bang!"	2007	Snoop Dogg, Kurupt	The Big Squeeze
"South-West"	2015	DJ EFN, MC Eiht, Blu	Another Time
"West Love"	2015	Mr. Criminal, Xzibit	Evolution of a G
"Search Warrant"	2015	Paris, WC, Big Tray Deee, Goldie Loc, E-40, Sandy Griffith	Pistol Politics
