= Act a Fool (album) =

Studio album by King Tee
- Released: November 15, 1988
- Genre: Hip hop
- Length: 42:38
- Label: Capitol
- Producer: DJ Pooh; King Tee

King Tee chronology
Act a Fool (1988)	At Your Own Risk (1990)

Singles from Act a Fool
- 1. "Paybacks a Mutha" Released: 1987; 2. "The Coolest" Released: 1987; 3. "Bass" Released: 1987; 4. "Act a Fool" Released: 1988

Professional ratings
Review scores
Source	Rating
AllMusic	4.5/5 stars

Act a Fool is the debut studio album by American West Coast hip hop artist King Tee. It was released on November 15, 1988, via Capitol Records. The album was produced by DJ Pooh and King Tee, with Tim Devine as executive producer. It features guest appearances from M.C. Breeze, Mixmaster Spade, and Prince Ezzy-E. The album peaked at number 125 on the US Billboard 200 chart and number 35 on the Top R&B/Hip-Hop Albums chart in the United States. Its title track reached No. 26 on the Hot Rap Songs chart, and "Bass", which is remixed on this album, reached No. 19 on the same chart.

Five of the eleven tracks of Act a Fool were later included on the rapper's greatest hits album, Ruff Rhymes: Greatest Hits Collection.

== Track listing ==
No.	Title	Producer(s)	Length
1.	"Act a Fool"	DJ Pooh	4:16
2.	"Ko Rock Stuff"	DJ Pooh	3:50
3.	"The Coolest"	DJ Pooh	5:17
4.	"Flirt"	DJ Pooh	3:47
5.	"Baggin' on Moms"	King Tee	2:04
6.	"Bass" (Remix)	DJ Pooh	4:41
7.	"Let's Dance" (featuring Prince Ezzy-E)	DJ Pooh	3:29
8.	"Guitar Playin'"	DJ Pooh; King Tee	5:20
9.	"Payback's a Mutha"	DJ Pooh	4:32
10.	"Just Clowning" (featuring M.C. Breeze and Mixmaster Spade)	DJ Pooh	4:40
11.	"I Got a Cold"	King Tee	0:42
Total length:			42:38

== Personnel ==
- Roger "King Tee" McBride – main artist, producer (tracks: 5, 8, 11)
- Frank Antonia "Mixmaster Spade" Williams – featured artist (track 10)
- Morgan "M.C. Breeze" Rodriguez – featured artist (track 11)
- Keith Cooley – scratches
- Mark "DJ Pooh" Jordan – producer (tracks: 1–4, 6–10), scratches
- Tim "Mastermind" Devine – executive producer
- Vachik Aghaniantz – engineering (tracks: 2–11), mixing (tracks: 2–9, 11)
- Chuck Valle – engineering (track 1)
- Steve Ett – mixing (track 1)
- Donovan Smith – mixing (track 10)
- Bernie Grundman – mastering
- Glen E. Friedman – photography

== Charts ==
Chart (1989)	Peak position
US Billboard 200	125
US Top R&B Albums (Billboard)	35
