= Ruff Rhymes: Greatest Hits Collection =

Greatest hits album by King Tee
- Released: November 3, 1998
- Genre: West Coast hip hop
- Length: 61:59
- Label: Capitol
- Producer: DJ Pooh; King Tee; Tha Alkaholiks; Bilal Bashir; Greg Mack; Bobcat; Lavashon Vasille

King Tee chronology
IV Life (1995)	Ruff Rhymes: Greatest Hits Collection (1998)	The Kingdom Come (2002)

Professional ratings
Review scores
Source	Rating
Allmusic	4/5 stars

Ruff Rhymes: Greatest Hits Collection is a greatest hits album by West Coast hip hop artist King Tee. It was released by Capitol Records in 1998, three years after King Tee's last album. It contains tracks from each of King Tee's first three albums, all of which were released by Capitol Records. It contains no tracks from Tee's fourth album, IV Life, which was released on MCA Records. King Tee was dropped by Capitol before this album's release so he had no say in which tracks would be put on it. Only three tracks on this compilation, "Bass", "Ya Better Bring a Gun", and "Can This Be Real?", are not on any of King Tee's other albums. The compilation's name is a reference to King Tee's most successful charting song, "Ruff Rhyme (Back Again)".

== Track listing ==
#	Title	Producer(s)	Performer (s)	Length
1	"Act a Fool"	DJ Pooh	King Tee	4:19
2	"Bass"	Bobcat, DJ Pooh, Greg Mack, Lavashon Vasille	King Tee	4:44
3	"Played Like a Piano"	DJ Pooh	Breeze, Ice Cube, King Tee	4:59
4	"Ruff Rhyme (Back Again)"	DJ Pooh	King Tee	3:32
5	"Payback's a Mutha"	DJ Pooh	King Tee	4:32
6	"At Your Own Risk"	DJ Pooh, King Tee	King Tee	4:07
7	"Guitar Playin'"	DJ Pooh, King Tee	King Tee	5:24
8	"Diss You"	Bilal Bashir	King Tee	4:16
9	"Can This Be Real?"	DJ Pooh	King Tee	3:46
10	"Bust Dat Ass"	King Tee	King Tee, Tha Alkaholiks	4:17
11	"The Coolest"	DJ Pooh	King Tee	5:08
12	"Just Clowning"	DJ Pooh	Breeze, King Tee, Mixmaster Spade	4:41
13	"Got It Bad Y'all"	DJ Pooh, Tha Alkaholiks	King Tee, Tha Alkaholiks	4:50
14	"Ya Better Bring a Gun"	DJ Pooh, Unknown	King Tee, Mixmaster Spade, The Compton Posse (DJ Slick, DJ Var, Hit Man, J-Ro, Papa and Sweet Tooth)	3:43
