= IV Life =

Studio album by King Tee
- Released: March 28, 1995
- Recorded: 1994
- Genre: West Coast hip hop
- Length: 50:18
- Label: MCA
- Producer: Broadway; King Tee; Big Moe X; Da Mic Profesah; DJ Pooh; D.St.; Mark Sparks; Nikke Nicole; Rashad; Slej Tha Ruffedge; T.R. Funk Ignitor; Thayad

King Tee chronology
| Tha Triflin' Album (1993) | IV Life (1995) | The Kingdom Come (2002) |

Singles from IV Life
- 1. "Dippin' / Duck" Released: June 28, 1994; 2. "Way Out There / Super Nigga" Released: February 21, 1995; 3. "Free Style Ghetto / Let's Get It On" Released: June 20, 1995

Professional ratings
Review scores
| Source | Rating |
|---|---|
| AllMusic | 4/5 stars |

IV Life is the fourth studio album by American West Coast hip hop artist King Tee. It was released on March 28, 1995, via MCA Records, making it his first album on the label after his split with Capitol Records. The album was produced by DJ Pooh, Moe Love, TR Love, Grand Mixer DXT, E-Swift, DJ Broadway, Mark Sparks, Rashad, Thayod, Da Mic Profesah, Nikke Nicole, SLJ, and King Tee. It features guest appearances from Xzibit, Breeze, and Tha Alkaholiks. The album spawned three singles: "Dippin'"/"Duck", "Way Out There"/"Super Nigga" and "Free Style Ghetto"/"Let's Get It On", but only "Dippin'" made it to Billboard charts, reaching number 46 on the Hot Rap Songs.

The album peaked at number 171 on the US Billboard 200, number 23 on the Top R&B/Hip-Hop Albums chart, number 10 on the Heatseekers Albums chart.

== Track listing ==
| No. | Title | Producer(s) | Length |
|---|---|---|---|
| 1. | "You Can't See Me" | Broadway; Mark Sparks | 4:23 |
| 2. | "Super Nigga" (featuring DJ Pooh & Rashad) | DJ Pooh; King Tee; J.R. Coes | 4:03 |
| 3. | "Duck" (featuring E-Swift) | Broadway; King Tee | 4:09 |
| 4. | "Dippin'" | Broadway; King Tee | 4:16 |
| 5. | "3 Strikes Ya' Out" | Big Moe X; T.R. Funk Ignitor | 4:19 |
| 6. | "Down Ass Loc" | Broadway; King Tee | 3:00 |
| 7. | "Free Style Ghetto" (featuring Breeze, Tha Alkaholiks & Xzibit) | Broadway; Thayod Ausar | 4:50 |
| 8. | "Way Out There" | Da Mic Profesah; Broadway (co.) | 4:35 |
| 9. | "Let's Get It On" (featuring Nikke Nicole) | Nikke Nicole | 4:29 |
| 10. | "Check the Flow" | Grand Mixer DXT; SLEJ Da Ruff Edge | 4:12 |
| 11. | "Advertisement" | Broadway; King Tee | 3:53 |
| 12. | "Dippin'" (Remix) | Broadway; King Tee | 4:09 |
| Total length: | | | 50:18 |

== Sample credits ==
You Can't See Me

- "Rule of Mind" by 9th Creation
- "Hot Sex" by A Tribe Called Quest

Super Nigga

- "The Look of Love" by Carmen McRae
- "Super Nigga" by Richard Pryor

Duck

- "Blind Alley" by the Emotions

Dippin'

- "Cherish" by the Four Tops
- "Cussin', Cryin' and Carryin' On" by Ike & Tina Turner

3 Strikes Ya' Out

- "Sing a Simple Song" by Sly & the Family Stone
- "Threnody for Sharon Tate" by Freddie Hubbard

Down Ass Loc

- "Maracas Beach" by Grover Washington, Jr.

Free Style Ghetto

- "Theme from Mahogany" by Diana Ross

Way Out There

- "Superman Theme" by Leon Klatzkin
- "She's Strange" by Cameo

Advertisement

- "Jungle Boogie" by Kool & the Gang

== Personnel ==
- Roger McBride – main artist, producer (tracks: 2–4, 6, 11–12)
- Mark S. Jordan – featured artist & producer (track 2)
- James Rashad Coes – featured artist & producer (track 2)
- Eric Brooks – featured artist (tracks: 3, 7)
- Rico Smith – featured artist (track 7)
- James Robinson – featured artist (track 7)
- Alvin Nathaniel Joiner – featured artist (track 7)
- M.C. Breeze – featured artist (track 7)
- Nicole Miller – featured artist & producer (track 9)
- James Broadway – producer (tracks: 1, 3, 4, 6, 7, 11, 12), co-producer (track 8)
- Johnathan Marc Blount – producer (track 1)
- Maurice Russell Smith – producer (track 5)
- Trevor Randolph – producer (track 5)
- Eric James Banks – producer (track 7)
- Da Mic Profesah – producer (track 8)
- Shafiq "SLJ" Husayn – producer (track 10)
- Derek Showard – producer (track 10)
- Bob Raylove – executive producer
- Dave Rideau – mixing (track 12)
- Victor "Vic C." Conception – remixing (track 12)
- Tom Baker – mastering

== Album singles ==
| Single cover | Single information |
|---|---|
| | "Dippin'": Released: June 28, 1994; B-side: "Duck" |
| | "Way Out There": Released: February 21, 1995; B-side: "Super Nigga" |
| | "Free Style Ghetto": Released: June 20, 1995; B-side: "Super Nigga", "Let's Get It On" |

== Chart positions ==
Album

| Chart (1995) | Peak position |
|---|---|
| US Billboard 200 | 171 |
| US Top R&B/Hip-Hop Albums (Billboard) | 23 |
| US Heatseekers Albums (Billboard) | 10 |

Singles

| Year | Song | Hot Rap Songs |
|---|---|---|
| 1994 | "Dippin'" | 46 |
