= The Kingdom Come =

Thy Kingdom Come

Studio album by King T
- Released: August 6, 2002
- Recorded: 1996–1997
- Genre: West Coast hip hop
- Length: 1:11:54
- Label: Greedy Green; Mo Beatz
- Producer: Dr. Dre (exec.); Ant Banks; Battlecat; Bud'da; DJ Quik; Fredwreck; Mike Dean; Stu-B-Doo

King T chronology
Ruff Rhymes: Greatest Hits Collection (1998)	Thy Kingdom Come (2002)	The Ruthless Chronicles (2004)

Professional ratings
Review scores
Source	Rating
RapReviews.com	6.5/10

Thy Kingdom Come is the fifth studio album by West Coast hip hop artist King T. It was released on August 6, 2002 on Greedy Green Entertainment and Mo Beatz. The album was originally titled The Kingdom Come and was slated for a release on June 30, 1998, on Aftermath Entertainment. The 1998 version was to be King Tee's first release of new material in three years after allying with Dr. Dre and appearing on his compilation, Dr. Dre Presents: The Aftermath. King Tee's album was later put on hold. His shelved album had already been rated three and a half stars out of five by The Source, which was "not good enough" for Dr. Dre, but King Tee maintained a positive relationship with Dr. Dre. He even appeared on Dr. Dre's album, 2001, in 1999. By 2002, The Kingdom Come was released under its new name Thy Kingdom Come to mixed opinions and was a commercial failure. It had no charting singles, and it did not chart as an album. The album has been released in some places under the original name "The Kingdom Come" with an alternative album cover. The song "Speak On It" also appeared on San Andreas: The Original Mixtape, an album by King T's protégé Young Maylay. Despite its challenging history of release and commercial success, it is officially available on streaming, and has recently been reissued on both vinyl and CD.

== Track listing ==
No.	Title	Producer(s)	Length
1.	"Intro" (performed by Ice-T)	Fredwreck	1:09
2.	"Speak on It"	Stu-B-Doo	3:29
3.	"Stay Down"	Bud'da	4:12
4.	"Squeeze Yo Balls" (featuring Baby S)	DJ Battlecat	3:57
5.	"Money" (featuring Dr. Dre)	Dr. Dre	4:13
6.	"Da'Kron"	Dr. Dre	4:28
7.	"Big Boyz" (featuring Too Short)	Ant Banks	3:12
8.	"Let's Make a V" (featuring DJ Quik, Frost and El DeBarge)	DJ Quik	4:51
9.	"Tha Game (It's Ruff)" (featuring Playa Hamm)	DJ Battlecat	5:27
10.	"Reel Raw" (featuring Sharief)	Dr. Dre	4:01
11.	"2 G's from Compton" (featuring MC Ren)	Stu-B-Doo	4:15
12.	"Shake Da Spot" (featuring Shaquille O'Neal)	Bud'da	3:46
13.	"6 N 'Na Moe'nin" (featuring Dawn Robinson)	Dr. Dre; The Glove	3:07
14.	"Step on By" (featuring Dr. Dre, RC and Crystal)	Dr. Dre	5:14
15.	"Big Ballin' (Playin' 2 Win)" (featuring RC)	Dr. Dre	5:03
16.	"Where's T" (featuring Dr. Dre)	Dr. Dre	3:16
17.	"Nuthin Has Changed" (featuring Kool G Rap and Tray Dee)	Bud'da	3:38
18.	"The Original" (featuring Who'z Who)	Mike Dean	4:33

Leftovers
No.	Title	Producer(s)	Length
19.	"Got It Locked"	Bud'da	4:02
20.	"That's Drama"	The Glove	4:10

=== Additional Information ===
On the 2002 release of The Kingdom Come, many song and personnel names are spelled differently:

- King Tee is credited as King T (Though he is credited as King T on all his songs on The Aftermath)
- DJ Quik is credited as DJ Quick
- Shaquille O'Neal is credited as Shaquille O'Neil in "Shake da Spot", which samples the talk box from "California Love", and interpolates lyrics for "Straight Outta Compton".
- Bud'da is credited as Budda
- Playa Hamm is credited as Playa Ham
- Stu-B-Doo is credited as Stu
- Sharief is credited as Killa Ben
- "Squeeze Yo Balls" is credited as "Skweez Ya Ballz"
- "Money" is credited as "Monay"
- "The Chron" is credited as "Da 'Kron" and samples skits from Snoop Dogg's "Who Am I (What's My Name)?".
- "Real Raw" is credited as "Reel Raw"
- "2 G's From Compton" samples the background chorus vocals from Snoop Dogg's "Who Am I (What's My Name)?".
- The beat of "6 N 'Na Moe'nin" was later released in "Zoom" by LL Cool J feat. Dr. Dre.
- Some versions of the album incorrectly credit Dr. Dre as the producer of "Speak on It"

There are two tracks on the original track listing that did not get released on the CD in 2002: "Got It Locked", "That's Drama". There was also a song around called "The Future", which used the same beat as the song "Xxplosive" from Dr. Dre's album, 2001. The 2002 release differs from the 1998 version, it contains 5 more tracks: "6 N 'Na Moe'nin", "Step On By", "Big Ballin'", "Where's T" and "The Original". Also the Track "2 G's From Compton" was in the 1998 version listed as "It's Where Ya From" and "Tha Game" was called "It's Ruff" previously. The two Interluldes "Drive By (Interlude)" and "Psychic Pimp (Interlude)" have been erased on the 2002 version. "Psychic Pimp (Interlude)" somehow later appeared on The D.O.C.'s 2003 album "Deuce". The Interlude later appeared on an Aftermath Entertainment sampler as "Psychic Pimp Hotline".
