= Jazzie Redd =

American radio personality

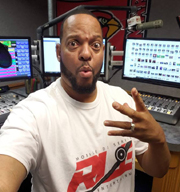
- Born: Rodney Lloyd Edmonson Sr. April 14; Houston, Texas, U.S.
- Education: Studied Music at University of Houston-Downtown
- Presenting career
- Show: BIG HOMIE Jazzie Redd (host)
- Station: Magic 102.5
- Style: Radio presenter
- Country: United States
- Website: www.ktcx.com/jazzie-redd

Rodney Lloyd Edmonson Sr. (born April 14), professionally known as Jazzie Redd is an American radio personality and former recording artist. He formerly hosts local radio show BIG HOMIE Jazzie Redd. Redd is also a national recording artist and actor noted for the success of his hit single and video “I Am a Dope Fiend” released on Pump/ Quality records. This anti-drug rap song gained him instant recognition in the music industry as early as 1992.

== Personal life and education ==
Redd was born Rodney Lloyd Edmonson Sr. on April 14, in Houston, Texas to mother Janie Mae Edmonson (died 2002) and father Ernie "the Big Cat" Ladd former American NFL professional football player and professional wrestler.

Rodney Lloyd Edmonson Sr. is currently married to Kailyn Edmonson having five children together (He also has three children from previous relationship). Five girls and three boys. Redd Studied Music at University of Houston-Downtown. He Studied Phlebotomy/EKG Tech at Concorde Career Institute. He also attended Jefferson Davis High School (Houston, Texas).

== Career ==
Redd started rapping in the early 80's and became the 1st rapper in Houston, Texas to record a 12" vinyl record called "Break Dancing" with a group called the Chance Band led by Reggie and Steve Cummings. Then he started his own record label Redd Smoke Records with iconic radio personality Jerry Smokin' B. Rupert and produced a 12" record entitled "Top Secret" with the late Eric Prince Ezzy E. Woods. Then Redd went on to become a radio personality for KTSU 90.9 Choice FM in Houston at Texas Southern University before making his way to California to sign a deal with Quality Records and rapper Toddy Tee. Redd co-wrote songs for King Tee and landed a national hit song called "I AM A DOPE FIEND" which gained national success. Then Jazzie Redd headed back to Houston to record 2 more projects with Kenneth Coleman on another self independent label called Stone Records. He released his second full-length studio album called The Voice of Authority as well as an E.P called "Mile High Madness". He Joined 97.9 the Box in 2002- 2006 as on air weekend personality before heading to Beaumont Texas to become a part of Cumulus Broadcasting at the number one radio station in the market, Magic 102.5 becoming the number one rated radio personality in South East Texas. Jazzie Redd is the former host on Magic 102.5 Monday thru Friday 5 pm to 10 pm. On May 22, 2019, the on-air personality posted on Facebook that he would be leaving Magic 102.5.

Mayor Sylvester Turner presented Redd with a proclamation on April 14, 2018, and declared that day "JAZZIE REDD DAY" in the city of Houston.

=== Radio Personality ===
Jazzie has worked as an on air talent at KTSU the Choice 90.9 FM as well as 97.9 The Box KBXX in Houston Texas. Also Hot 97.9 FM in Lake Charles, Louisiana, Isle 95 in St. Croix and has made numerous contributions to the music and entertainment industry for the past decades with multiple accolades and credits to his name. He currently hosts local radio show BIG HOMIE Jazzie Redd on Magic 102.5 FM and has made numerous contributions to the music and entertainment industry for the past decades with multiple accolades and credits to his name. He currently hosts local radio show BIG HOMIE Jazzie Redd on Magic 102.5 FM and has made numerous contributions to the music and entertainment industry for the past decades with multiple accolades and credits to his name. He currently hosts local radio show BIG HOMIE Jazzie Redd on Magic 102.5 FM and has made numerous contributions to the music and entertainment industry for the past decades with multiple accolades and credits to his name. He currently hosts local radio show BIG HOMIE Jazzie Redd on Magic 102.5 FM and has made numerous contributions to the music and entertainment industry for the past decades with multiple accolades and credits to his name. He currently hosts local radio show BIG HOMIE Jazzie Redd on Magic 102.5 FM and has made numerous contributions to the music and entertainment industry for the past decades with multiple accolades and credits to his name. Jazzie Redd formerly hosts local radio show BIG HOMIE Jazzie Redd on Magic 102.5 FM in Beaumont, Texas.

=== Recording artist ===
As a national recording artist Jazzie Redd is noted for the national success of his smash hit single and video “I Am a Dope Fiend” released on Pump/ Quality records selling units nationwide. This anti-drug rap song gained him instant recognition in the music industry as early as 1992.

Albums

- Spice of Life - Pump Records (1990)
- The Voice of Authority - Stone Records (1995)

Singles and EPs

- Top Secret (12") - Redd Smoke Records (1987)
- Beach Girl - Pump Records (1990)
- The Colors of Jazz EP - Pump Records (1991)
- I Am a Dope Fiend - Pump Records (1992)
- Misery Loves Company / The Colors of Jazz (12") - Stone Records (1992)
- Mile High Madness - Stone Records (1993)
- Voice of Authority - Stone Records (1995)

=== Acting career ===
Jazzie has also done some work on Robert Townsend’s film “The Five Heartbeats” for 20th century Fox, as well as “The M.C Hammer Story” for VH1 and had a featured role in the AB Harris film “Deadly Wordz” and has also starred in the hit gospel stage plays “Lord I Wont Complain” by Carol Eisom, “Don’t You Wanna Go To Heaven?” by Loretta Francisco-Norris, “When Momma Prays” by Evangelist Jerry P. Beasley and “Blue Front Blues” by Roseadrian Productions. You can also catch Jazzie Redd in the Wreckshop Records film “The Dirty 3rd part 2.”

=== Other endeavors ===
He is also CEO of RLE Entertainment mobile DJ service and owner of Edmonson Cleaning Service based in South East Texas.
