= DJ Pooh =

American record producer (born 1966)

- Born: Mark Jordan; June 29, 1966 (age 60); Los Angeles, California, U.S.
- Genre: Hip-hop
- Occupations: Record producer; rapper; screenwriter; actor; film director
- Years active: 1986–present
- Labels: Lench Mob; Big Beat; Atlantic
- Formerly of: L.A. Posse; Uncle Jamm's Army

Mark Jordan (born June 29, 1966), better known by his stage name DJ Pooh, is an American record producer and actor. He is perhaps best known for his production work on Ice Cube's 1993 single "It Was a Good Day", which remains one of the most popular songs in hip-hop. Pooh was also part of the musical group Uncle Jamm's Army, as well as the West Coast production outfit L.A. Posse.

As a recording artist, he signed with Big Beat Records, an imprint of Atlantic Records to release his debut studio album, Bad Newz Travels Fast (1997), which entered the Billboard 200. In other media, Jordan has also co-written the F. Gary Gray film Friday, directed the films The Wash and 3 Strikes, and co-produced the video games Grand Theft Auto: San Andreas, Grand Theft Auto V, and Grand Theft Auto Online.

== Biography ==
Most known for his acting role as Red in the film Friday with Ice Cube, DJ Pooh co-wrote Friday and helped with character development. As a record producer and mixing engineer, DJ Pooh has produced albums for 2Pac, Ice Cube, Del tha Funkee Homosapien, LL Cool J, Yo-Yo, Tha Dogg Pound, King T and many more. In 1986–1987, DJ Pooh provided production for LL Cool J's second album, Bigger and Deffer. The album was certified double platinum. He also produced 2Pac's All Eyez on Me in 1995. The album is certified diamond. He provided the bulk of the production for Snoop Dogg's second album, Tha Doggfather, in 1996. The album is certified double platinum. DJ Pooh began in film by producing the drive-by shooting sequence in the 1991 film, Boyz n the Hood. He plays all three "Mack" characters in the video for the Ice Cube song "Who's the Mack?" from AmeriKKKa's Most Wanted. He has also written, produced and directed his own films, that include the 2000 film 3 Strikes and 2001's The Wash, which stars Dr. Dre and Snoop Dogg. DJ Pooh has been credited as co-producer and writer to the successful game Grand Theft Auto: San Andreas. He was a creative consultant on Grand Theft Auto V and is also a co-writer of the online version, making several cameo appearances, in addition to being a DJ on the radio station "West Coast Classics" within the game. DJ Pooh also appeared in three episodes of The Boondocks.

== Discography ==
=== Studio albums ===
Album information
Bad Newz Travels Fast
- Released: July 15, 1997
- Chart positions: #116 US, #34 Top R&B/Hip Hop
- RIAA certification: (Uncertified)
- Singles: "Whoop! Whoop!"

== Filmography ==
- Friday – Red, co-writer
- Next Friday - Himself (uncredited)
- 3 Strikes – Trick Turner / Taxi Driver, director and writer
- The Wash – Slim, director, producer and writer
- Grand Theft Auto: San Andreas – co-producer & writer
- The Boondocks – Mudpie / Speaker #2 / Crowd Member / Laughing Funeral Attendee (voice only), creative consultant
- Freaknik: The Musical – Doela Man (voice only)
- Grand Theft Auto V – creative consultant, DJ on West Coast Classics radio station
- Grand Theft Auto Online – cameo as himself, also writer
- Grow House – director and writer
