= First Round Knock Out =

Compilation album by Dr. Dre
- Released: May 21, 1996
- Recorded: 1985–1996
- Genre: Hip-hop
- Length: 51:04
- Label: Triple X
- Producers: Chris "The Glove" Taylor; Cold 187um; Dr. Dre; Lonzo Williams

Dr. Dre chronology
Concrete Roots (1994)	First Round Knock Out (1996)	Back 'N the Day (1996)

Professional ratings
Review scores
Source	Rating
AllMusic	1.5/5 stars
The New Rolling Stone Album Guide	1/5 stars

First Round Knock Out is the second compilation album by American rapper and record producer Dr. Dre. It was released on May 21, 1996, on Triple X Records. Billed as "a retrospective of early tracks produced by Dr. Dre", the album contains 15 tracks featuring or produced by Dre, including a version of "Deep Cover", unreleased the D.O.C.'s "Bridgette" and Rose Royce's "It's Not Over", material by Michel'le, Jimmy Z, Kokane, Po' Broke & Lonely, and numbers during his World Class Wreckin' Cru time.

The album peaked at number 52 on the Billboard 200 and number 18 on the Top R&B/Hip-Hop Albums charts in the United States.

In 1996, Dr. Dre and Interscope Records sued Triple X Records and Missing Link Entertainment for unlawfully appropriating Dr. Dre's name and likeness by manufacturing, disturbing, selling and advertising the album, which is "likely to cause confusion or mistake or deceive the consuming public as to the origin and content of the production". The lawsuit failed and the compilation remained on the market. The compilation, alongside Concrete Roots and Back 'N the Day, is unrecognized as part of the official Dr. Dre discography.

== Track listing ==
No.	Title	Writer(s)	Producer(s)	Length
1.	"First Round Knock Out" (Intro)
2.	"Deep Cover" (performed by Dr. Dre and Snoop Doggy Dogg)	Andre Young; Colin Wolfe; Calvin Broadus	Dr. Dre
3.	"Bridgette" (performed by The D.O.C.)	Tracy Curry; Young	Dr. Dre
4.	"Nickel Slick Nigga" (performed by Kokane)	Jerry Long; Edwin Birdsong; Roy Ayers	Cold 187um; Dr. Dre (ass.); Eazy-E (exec.); Laylaw (exec.)
5.	"Requests"
6.	"He's Bionic" (performed by World Class Wreckin' Cru)	Alonzo Williams; Young	Dr. Dre
7.	"Juice" (performed by World Class Wreckin' Cru)	Williams; Marquette Hawkins; Young	Dr. Dre
8.	"Funky Flute" (performed by Jimmy Z and Dr. Dre)	Jimmy Zavala; Young; David Harvey	Dr. Dre
9.	"Nicety" (performed by Michel'le)	Michel'le Toussant; Young	Dr. Dre
10.	"Indo Freak"
11.	"Turn Off the Lights" (performed by World Class Wreckin' Cru and Michel'le)	Williams	Lonzo Williams; Dr. Dre
12.	"Who's Phuckin' Who?"
13.	"The Sex Is On" (performed by Po', Broke & Lonely?)	Chris Taylor; Ruben Cruz Monge; Michael Lynn	Chris "The Glove" Taylor
14.	"It's Not Over" (performed by Rose Royce)	Kenny Copeland	Dr. Dre
15.	"The Fly" (performed by World Class Wreckin' Cru)	Williams; Young	Dr. Dre
Total length:				51:04

== Charts ==
Chart (1996)	Peak position
US Billboard 200	52
US Top R&B/Hip-Hop Albums (Billboard)	18
