= Jerry Heller =

American music manager and businessman (1940–2016)

- Heller in 2004
- Born: Gerald Elliot Heller; October 6, 1940; Cleveland, Ohio, U.S.
- Died: September 2, 2016 (aged 75); Thousand Oaks, California, U.S.
- Resting place: Eden Memorial Park Cemetery
- Occupation: Music manager
- Years active: 1961–2016
- Spouse: Gayle Steiner (m. 1996; div. 2014)

Gerald Elliot Heller (October 6, 1940 – September 2, 2016) was an American music manager and businessman. He was best known for managing West Coast rap and gangsta rap pioneers N.W.A and Eazy-E. He rose to prominence in the 1960s and 1970s representing Journey, Marvin Gaye, Van Morrison, War, Eric Burdon, Crosby Stills & Nash, Ike & Tina Turner, Creedence Clearwater Revival, Otis Redding, The Who, REO Speedwagon, Black Sabbath, Humble Pie, Styx, the Grass Roots, and the Standells, among many others.

In the mid-1980s, he worked with R&B and hip hop acts like Michel'le, World Class Wreckin' Cru, J. J. Fad, The D.O.C., Egyptian Lover and LA Dream Team.

Heller was instrumental in the emergence of West Coast rap music when he managed Ruthless Records with Eazy-E and discovered, signed or managed the likes of N.W.A, The Black Eyed Peas, Above the Law, The D.O.C. and Bone Thugs-n-Harmony. Dr. Dre brought The D.O.C. and Above the Law to Ruthless in its early days, and Eazy introduced Bone in the later years.

== Early life and education ==
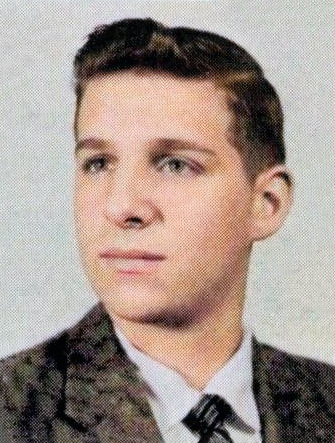
Heller in 1958

Born to a Jewish family in Cleveland, Ohio, Heller served in the United States Army and attended college at the University of Southern California, and started working in the agency business in 1963.

== Career ==
After working at Coast Artists, Associated Booking, and the Chartwell, he opened the Heller-Fischel Agency in Beverly Hills which represented rock groups the Who, Grand Funk Railroad, Black Sabbath, Humble Pie, and Black Oak Arkansas as well as writers Carly Simon, Van Morrison, and Cat Stevens. He later bought out partner Don Fischel, who went on to package independent TV productions. Heller believed that a key factor in keeping acts working between or after a hit record was not to be greedy and package his own clients together, but to tour them in salable packages with other headline acts that were clients of other agencies.

Starting in the mid-1980s, Heller represented rap musicians as the genre became popular with the record-buying U.S. public. His work with Ruthless Records and with Eazy-E formed the foundation for the successes of Priority Records and Interscope Records. To date, Ruthless Records has sold in excess of 110 million records, not counting singles. The label included artists and producers such as Dr. Dre, whose careers Heller helped establish, and sold millions of records for Interscope, Priority, Atlantic, MCA, and Sony. At the time of Eazy-E's death and Heller's departure from Ruthless, the company was generating more than $10 million in revenue per month.

=== Managing the rise of West Coast rap ===
In the 1980s, Heller began managing acts on the nascent Los Angeles hip hop scene, many of whom recorded for the now defunct Macola in Hollywood. He managed both C.I.A., of which Ice Cube was a member, and the World Class Wreckin' Cru, which included Dr. Dre and DJ Yella. On March 3, 1987, he met Eazy-E, and the two became co-founders of Ruthless. Under the direction of Heller and Eazy, Ruthless had six RIAA-certified Platinum or Gold releases in three years: Supersonic (J. J. Fad), Eazy-Duz-It (Eazy-E), Straight Outta Compton (N.W.A), No One Can Do It Better (The D.O.C.), Michel'le's self-titled debut, and Niggaz4Life (N.W.A).

=== After N.W.A ===
N.W.A broke up in 1991 when Dr. Dre left. Ice Cube left in 1990 and had been dissed by N.W.A, including Dr. Dre, on the 1990 EP 100 Miles and Runnin'. Jerry Heller and Eazy E became the subject of diss tracks such as No Vaseline and Fuck wit Dre Day (And Everybody's Celebratin'). Dr. Dre later recalled: "The split came when Jerry Heller got involved. He played the divide and conquer game. Instead of taking care of everybody, he picked Eazy to handle it. And Eazy was like, 'I'm taken care of, so fuck it'."

=== Book ===
In 2006, Heller's memoir, Ruthless: A Memoir, written with Gil Reavill, was published by Simon & Schuster/Simon Spotlight Entertainment. In the work, Heller addressed many events that he had previously remained silent on.

Heller wrote that the letter the FBI sent after the N.W.A song "Fuck tha Police" was actually a rogue action by a "single pissed-off bureaucrat with a bully pulpit" named Milt Ahlerich (FBI Assistant Director), who was falsely purporting to represent the FBI as a whole and that the action "earned him a transfer to the Bureau's backwater Hartford office". He also wrote that he removed all sensitive documents from the office of Ruthless Records in case of an FBI raid.

He denied accusations of financial impropriety. In particular, he wrote that Ice Cube didn't understand finances and alluded to rumors of his own financial impropriety on his own record label and his use of "White representatives" in hiring the William Morris Agency to represent himself. Similarly, Heller claimed that Dr. Dre had been present for all contract negotiations and had never protested until after he came under Suge Knight's influence, although he said that he had returned to more cordial relations with Dr. Dre since the latter's split from Suge Knight. However, some members of the group have said that their first check was not released until they signed contracts, which they did not have reviewed by outside lawyers or managers.

Heller defended himself in his book, stating:

N.W.A's song publishing royalties were always hefty because the band sold so many records ... Ruthless took twenty-five cents out of each dollar of publishing royalties. Again, a fairly customary bite. Some labels take 100 percent. The other publishing companies involved (Cube included) also took twenty-five cents. Of the fifty cents left, the lyric writer took twenty-five cents, and the beat writer took twenty-five cents. Dre composed the beats for every song N.W.A ever put out, so he always got that quarter out of every dollar coming in, less deductions for all his sampling. You wrote a lot of the words, Cube, so some of the time you took a quarter bite out of those dollars. There were quite a few times though, when you had to share with cowriters, such as Dre, Yella, the D.O.C., Eazy, or Ren. So you had to share your quarter ... It's not robbery. It's not a Jewish conspiracy to rip off the poor artist. What it is, O'Shea, is mathematics--pure and simple. You received every single penny that was coming to you. If you say you didn't, then you are lying.

Of the song "No Vaseline", Heller wrote that he didn't believe that Ice Cube was genuinely anti-Semitic and was nothing but "pro-Ice Cube", but had exploited prejudices in the Afro-American community to help his career.

He claimed that the deathbed letter from Eazy-E was a forgery: "Eric would never have put out a letter that was that corny." Heller wrote that Eazy-E had eight children and not seven as the letter stated.

When Dr. Dre beat Dee Barnes in the midst of the feud between Ice Cube and the remaining members of N.W.A, Heller called the incident "disgraceful" and that he was "left to clean up the mess". Heller said that Dr. Dre was generally non-violent and mild-mannered, but had drunk too much on that night.

In a 2013 interview on the Murder Master Music Show, Heller said that Eazy-E had planned on murdering Suge Knight, but Heller was able to talk him out of it. Heller said he was in his office when Eazy-E told him, "You know this guy Suge Knight? Well, I'm gonna kill him ... This guy's gonna be a problem, and I'm gonna kill him." Heller said that he told Eazy it didn't make sense to kill Knight. It wouldn't be worth the risk, citing that Ruthless was the most successful startup record company ever, making $10 million a month with only six employees and, as Heller put it, "not even having a typewriter in their office."

Heller said that, given everything that had transpired afterward, he regrets talking Eazy out of it. "You know something? I should have let him kill him. I would have done the world a favor. He would have done it for sure by himself. He always rolled by himself and he was fearless. I think that he was going to go do it. I took him seriously. He was right and I was wrong."

=== Straight Outta Compton depiction lawsuit ===
Heller was portrayed by actor Paul Giamatti in the 2015 N.W.A biopic film Straight Outta Compton.

In October 2015, Heller filed a lawsuit against several members of N.W.A, NBCUniversal and others involved in the production of Straight Outta Compton. He also filed lawsuits against rappers Dr. Dre and Ice Cube. The lawsuit claims "the film is littered with false statements that harm the reputation of (Heller) and aim to ridicule and lower him in the opinion of the community and to deter third persons from associating or dealing with him."

Producers of the film, including Ice Cube and Dr. Dre, filed a countersuit in February 2016 seeking to have portions of the suit thrown out. In June 2016, U.S. District Court Judge Michael Fitzgerald dismissed nearly all of Heller's lawsuit, but agreed to allow one claim to continue. Despite Heller's death in September 2016, his attorney Mickey Shapiro indicated the lawsuit would continue.

In September 2018, a California judge dismissed the lawsuit two years after his death. In 2016, Heller signed a production agreement with Mikel Ravenscroft of Hollywood Motion Pictures to produce The Jerry Heller Story, a movie of his life and his version of the NWA events.

=== Surviving Compton depiction ===
Heller was portrayed by Jamie Kennedy in the 2016 film Surviving Compton. In contrast to the negative portrayal in Straight Outta Compton, Heller is portrayed in the film as defending Michel'le against violent treatment from Dr. Dre, which led writer Ben Westhoff to say that Heller "somehow comes off better than anyone else".

== Death ==
On September 2, 2016, Heller suffered a heart attack while driving, crashed his car, and later died at Los Robles Hospital & Medical Center in Thousand Oaks, California. He was 75 years old. Heller's lawyer blamed the depiction of him in the film Straight Outta Compton as a contributing factor in his death, saying the film placed him under a tremendous amount of stress and that “Jerry Heller would be alive today if not for that movie.” He was interred at Eden Memorial Park Cemetery.
