= Surviving Compton: Dre, Suge & Michel'le =

2016 television film by Janice Cooke

- Genre: Biographical drama
- Written by: Dianne Houston
- Directed by: Janice Cooke
- Starring: Rhyon Nicole Brown; Jamie Kennedy
- Narrated by: Michel'le
- Music by: Kathryn Bostic
- Country of origin: United States
- Original language: English

Production
- Executive producer: Leslie Greif
- Producers: Paul Coy Allen; Steven R. McGlothen
- Cinematography: Peter Menzies Jr.
- Editor: Sandy Pereira
- Running time: 87 minutes
- Production companies: Thinkfactory Media; Sony Pictures Television

Original release
- Network: Lifetime
- Release: October 15, 2016

Surviving Compton: Dre, Suge & Michel'le is a 2016 American biographical drama television film directed by Janice Cooke, written by Dianne Houston, and starring Rhyon Nicole Brown as Michel'le, Curtis Hamilton as Dr. Dre and Jamie Kennedy as N.W.A's manager Jerry Heller. The film is based on the true story of R&B singer Michel'le. The omission of Michel'le's involvement in the lives of Dre in N.W.A's 2015 biopic, Straight Outta Compton, gave her an opportunity to tell her story as a former artist on Eazy-E's Ruthless Records.

The film premiered on Lifetime on October 15, 2016.

== Plot ==
Michel'le was discovered at a young age and benefited from N.W.A’s early success. Surrounded by artists like Eazy-E to Tupac Shakur, she climbed the charts. After a tumultuous relationship with Dr. Dre, she grew closer to Suge Knight, co-founder of Death Row Records and Dre's business partner. She would have children from both men.

== Cast ==
- Rhyon Nicole Brown as Michel'le
- Jamie Kennedy as Jerry Heller
- Curtis Hamilton as Dr. Dre
- Vonii Bristow as Ice Cube
- Omari Wallace as Eazy-E
- Daniel DeBoe as M.C. Ren
- Deric Augustine as DJ Yella
- Kedrick Brown as Alonzo Williams
- R. Marcos Taylor as Suge Knight
- Adrian Arthur as Tupac Shakur
- Michel'le as herself / The Narrator

== Reception ==
Prior to the release of the film, Dr. Dre's lawyers threatened legal action against the filmmakers if the movie contained scenes of him assaulting her, which he denied. However, the film portrays Dre physically abusing Michel'le, even shooting at her in one scene. Dre ultimately did not take any legal actions for his depiction.

=== Reviews ===
Reviewing the film, Ben Westhoff at The Guardian wrote:

The question many viewers will have after their viewing: is the film accurate? I would say, for the most part, yes. I extensively interviewed Michel’le and other survivors of Dre’s alleged abuse for my new book Original Gangstas: the Untold Story of Dr Dre, Eazy-E, Ice Cube, Tupac Shakur, and the Birth of West Coast Rap, and investigated their claims. The film largely echoes Michel'le’s accounts to me, though she never went to police with her allegations – unlike other women including television host Dee Barnes and Lisa Johnson, the mother of three of Dre's children who alleged he beat her many times, including while she was pregnant. (Dre pled no contest to beating Barnes, and received probation, while Johnson was granted a restraining order against him. A Ruthless rapper named Tairrie B also maintains that Dre beat her.)

Westhoff also noted that Jerry Heller was portrayed sympathetically and "somehow comes off better than anyone else".

== Awards and nominations ==
Surviving Compton: Dre, Suge & Michel'le was nominated for Writers Guild of America Award for Television: Long Form – Original at the 69th Writers Guild of America Awards in 2016.
