= My Posse =

Single by C.I.A.
- Released: January 1, 1987
- Recorded: 1986
- Studio: Audio Achievements, Inc.
- Genre: West Coast hip hop; new school hip hop
- Length: 5:24
- Label: Kru-Kut; Macola
- Songwriter: O'Shea Jackson
- Producer: Dr. Dre

C.I.A. singles chronology
"She's a Skag" (1986)	"My Posse" (1987)

My Posse is the only release by American rap group C.I.A. (Cru' in Action!). The record has received more than one pressing by record companies Macola and Kru-Cut. Alonzo Williams was credited for executive production of the 12" single. Personnel include Dr. Dre as producer and turntablist, as well as a then-17-year-old Ice Cube as writer and rapper. The single was recorded in 1986 and released in 1987.

== Track listing ==
Side A
No.	Title	Lyrics	Length
1.	"My Posse"	O'Shea Jackson	5:24
2.	"Jus 4 The Cash $"	Jackson	4:30
3.	"Ill-Legal"	Jackson, Darrell Johnson	4:55

Side B
No.	Title	Lyrics	Length
1.	"My Posse" (Instrumental)	O'Shea Jackson	5:24
2.	"Jus 4 The Cash $" (Instrumental)	Jackson	4:30
3.	"Ill-Legal" (Instrumental)	Jackson, Darrell Johnson	4:55
Total length:			28:18

== Personnel ==
C.I.A.	Production	Ref
Ice Cube (O'Shea Jackson); Sir Jinx (Tony Wheaton); Kid Disaster (Darrell Johnson)	Dr. Dre - Producer; Donovan Smith - Engineer; Lonzo Williams - Executive Producer; Dr. Dre - Mixing	
