= Concrete Roots =

Compilation album by Dr. Dre
- Released: September 20, 1994
- Genre: Hip hop
- Length: 57:09
- Label: Triple X Records; Hitman Music
- Producer: Dr. Dre; DJ Flash (also exec.)

Dr. Dre chronology
The Chronic (1992)	Concrete Roots (1994)	First Round Knock Out (1996)

Professional ratings
Review scores
Source	Rating
AllMusic	1.5/5 stars
The Encyclopedia of Popular Music	2/5 stars
MusicHound R&B: The Essential Album Guide	1.5/5 stars
Spin Alternative Record Guide	2/10

Concrete Roots is a compilation album containing songs produced by Dr. Dre, released in 1994. The album was conceived and compiled by Lee "DJ Flash" Johnson. The album peaked at No. 43 on the Billboard 200.

== Critical reception ==
Trouser Press wrote: "With the exception of Michel’le’s smooth kiss-off 'No More Lies,' the mostly sub-B-side cuts are a weak mix of filler and watered-down, post-disco rap from Dre and Yella’s pre-N.W.A outfit, the oft-ridiculed and ridiculously attired World Class Wreckin’ Cru’."

Vibe gave the compilation a mixed review, writing that it puts Dre's early work in "proper context" and "historical perspective." It also praised the D.O.C.'s contributions.

== Track listing ==
No.	Title	Length
1.	"Concrete Roots Intro"	5:43
2.	"The Formula" (The D.O.C)	4:10
3.	"Mo' Juice" (Cli-N-Tel)	4:10
4.	"It's Funky Enough" (The D.O.C)	4.28
5.	"Dre's Beat Remix" (Cli-N-Tel)	0:49
6.	"Surgery II" (Cli-N-Tel)	4:28
7.	"Paid For It"	0:26
8.	"No More Lies"" (Michel'le)	3:42
9.	"Another "G" Thang"" (Leon Haywood)	5:42
10.	"The Planet" (Cli-N-Tel)	5:06
11.	"Dre's Beat" (Cli-N-Tel)	3:30
12.	"Must Be The Music" (The World Class Wreckin' Cru)	5:02
13.	"The Grand Finale" (The D.O.C & N.W.A)	4:38
14.	"N-Tervu"	0:42
15.	"Concrete Roots (Radio Reprise)" (Cli-N-Tel)	4:11

== Charts ==
Chart	Peak position
U.S. Billboard 200	43
U.S. Billboard Top R&B/Hip Hop Albums	17

== Credits ==
- Peter Heur - Executive Producer
- DJ Flash - Executive Producer
- The World Class Wreckin' Cru - Performer
- Dr. Dre - Arranger, Drums, Vocals, Producer, Main Performer, Keyboards, Drum Programming
- Dean Naleway - Executive Producer
- Yvette Clark Art - Direction, Design
- William "Dr. Z." Zimmerman - Keyboards
- DJ Yella - Programming, Producer
- Cli-N-Tel - Producer
- Stan Jones - Guitar
- Ice Cube - Vocals
- N.W.A - Vocals
- Leon Haywood - Performer
- Victor Brooks - Remixing
- Lonzo - Associate Producer, Executive Producer, Remixing
- Derrell Black - Vocals
- Wreckin' Cru - Executive Producer
- Eazy-E - Vocals
- Billy Jam Liner - Notes
- MC Ren - Vocals
- Monalisa Young - Vocals (Background)
