= The Defiant Ones (TV series) =

American television documentary miniseries

- Promotional poster
- Genre: Documentary
- Written by: Allen Hughes; Lasse Järvi; Doug Pray
- Directed by: Allen Hughes
- Music by: Atticus Ross; Leopold Ross; Claudia Sarne
- Country of origin: United States
- Original language: English
- No. of seasons: 1
- No. of episodes: 4

Production
- Producers: Ryan Gallagher; Broderick Johnson; Gene Kirkwood; Andrew A. Kosove; Laura Lancaster; Charles Parish; Brady Kephart; Sarah Anthony; Steven D. Williams; Fritzi Horstman; Allen Hughes; Doug Pray
- Cinematography: Shane Daly; Charles Parish; Vincent Wrenn
- Editors: Lasse Järvi; Doug Pray
- Running time: 60 minutes
- Production companies: Silverback 5150 Productions; Alcon Television Group

Original release
- Network: HBO
- Release: July 9 – July 12, 2017

The Defiant Ones is a four-part American television documentary series, directed by Allen Hughes, that aired on HBO from July 9 to July 12, 2017. It focuses on the careers of and partnership between Jimmy Iovine and Dr. Dre, co-founders of Beats Electronics.

== Overview ==
The four-part documentary examines the partnership between Jimmy Iovine and Dr. Dre and their leading roles in a chain of transformative events in contemporary culture through interviews with the men themselves and others who were involved. Some scenarios are broadly reenacted.

== Cast ==
As themselves:

- Jimmy Iovine
- Dr. Dre
- Trent Reznor
- Alonzo Williams
- Ice Cube
- Patti Smith
- Bruce Springsteen
- Bono
- Sean Combs
- Kendrick Lamar
- Nas
- Stevie Nicks
- Tom Petty
- Snoop Dogg
- Will.i.am
- Eminem
- Gwen Stefani
- The D.O.C.
- Dee Barnes
- DJ Yella
- MC Ren

Reenactments:

- Gregory Schwabe as FBI Agent
- Mark Anthony Petrucelli as David Kenner

== Episodes ==
=== Part 1 ===
Years before they sell their Beats headphone company to Apple Inc. for US $3 billion (the largest acquisition in Apple's history), Dr. Dre and Jimmy Iovine's music careers begin on opposite coasts with nothing but a little ambition, many frustrating setbacks, and a few good breaks — allowing each to show the world their talent for producing hits.

=== Part 2 ===
NWA skyrockets to success with provocative recordings like "Fuck tha Police" but tragedies, ego and money conflicts eventually leave Dr. Dre on his own. Meanwhile, Jimmy Iovine finds his own mix of huge hits and personal battles while producing Tom Petty, Stevie Nicks, and U2.

=== Part 3 ===
Jimmy Iovine co-founds Interscope Records and signs edgy artists like Nine Inch Nails and Dr. Dre, whose 1992 album The Chronic helps ignite a national, political firestorm over gangster rap lyrics and free speech. Simultaneously, Dre, Snoop Dogg, and Tupac Shakur get in a violent feud with East Coast rivals.

=== Part 4 ===
Dr. Dre and Jimmy Iovine strike gold with Eminem and others, but Napster and digital piracy threaten to destroy the music business. Desperate for alternatives and facing hard personal times, Jimmy and Dre create Beats Electronics which leads to a historic 2014 megadeal with Apple Inc., forever sealing their legacies.

== Release ==
The documentary aired on HBO on four consecutive nights from July 9 to July 12, 2017, and was also made available in its entirety for streaming on Blu-ray. The DVD/Blu-ray release was eventually pressed by Universal Pictures Home Entertainment. It was given a TV-MA rating, meaning that it may be unsuitable for children under the age of 17.

On February 9, 2018, Netflix announced it had acquired the exclusive distribution rights to the series in all territories outside of the United States and Canada. The streaming service premiered the series in their acquired territories on March 23, 2018, listing it under their "Netflix Original Series" banner.

== Soundtrack ==
The soundtrack to the documentary was released on Interscope Records, under license from Universal Music Enterprises.

== Reception ==
=== Critical response ===
On the review aggregator website Rotten Tomatoes, 100% of 25 critics' reviews are positive. The website's consensus reads: "The Defiant Ones is a compelling, comprehensive portrait of two visionaries that illuminates both their colorful pasts and their historic influence on the music industry." On Metacritic the film has a weighted average score of 76 out of 100 based on 12 critics, indicating "generally favorable" reviews.

Jon Caramanica of The New York Times called it "glossy, rapidly-paced, ambitious and often fun" as well as "impressively lush and well-resourced" in his positive review. Lorraine Ali of the Los Angeles Times wrote that "the decades of struggle and successes leading up to" the deal with Apple "make this four-part series stand out in the crowded field of music docs" in her positive review. Variety's Jem Aswad wrote that the documentary "tells a compelling story and tells it effectively and well, but its bloated length is a bit hard to justify". Aswad noted the frequent use of reaction shots, dubbed by the editors as the "Empathy Cut". IndieWire's Ben Travers praised the "fast pace and entertaining design".

=== Accolades ===
The Defiant Ones won the 2017 Grammy Award for Best Music Film and the IDA Award for Best Limited Series. The series also garnered five Emmy Award nominations (Outstanding Documentary or Nonfiction Series, Picture Editing for a Nonfiction Program, Sound Editing for a Nonfiction Program, Sound Mixing for a Nonfiction Program, Writing for a Nonfiction Program) and an ACE Eddie nomination for Best Edited Documentary. Director Allen Hughes won the NAACP Award for Outstanding Direction in a Documentary. Editors Doug Pray and Lasse Järvi won an HPA Award for Outstanding Editing (Television over 30 minutes).

Year	Association	Category	Nominee(s)	Result	Ref.
2018	American Cinema Editors	Best Edited Documentary - Television	Lasse Järvi; Doug Pray	Nominated	
2018	Primetime Emmy Awards	Outstanding Sound Editing for a Nonfiction Program (Single or Multi-Camera)	Jay Nierenberg; Del Spiva; Katrina Frederick; David Mann; Todd Niesen	Nominated	
2018	Primetime Emmy Awards	Outstanding Sound Mixing for a Nonfiction Program (Single or Multi-Camera)	Chris Jenkins; Gabriel Andy Giner	Nominated	
2018	Primetime Emmy Awards	Outstanding Picture Editing for Nonfiction Programming	Lasse Järvi; Doug Pray	Nominated	
2018	Primetime Emmy Awards	Outstanding Directing for a Nonfiction Program	Allen Hughes; Lasse Järvi; Doug Pray	Nominated	
2018	Primetime Emmy Awards	Outstanding Documentary or Nonfiction Series	Allen Hughes; Doug Pray	Nominated	
2018	Grammy Awards	Best Music Film	Allen Hughes; Andrew A. Kosove; Laura Lancaster; Broderick Johnson; Fritzi Horstman; Sarah Anthony; Gene Kirkwood; Steven D. Williams; Doug Pray	Won	
2018	NAACP Image Awards	Outstanding Documentary	The Defiant Ones	Nominated	
2018	NAACP Image Awards	Outstanding Directing in a Television Movie, Documentary or Special	Allen Hughes	Won	
2018	International Documentary Association	Best Limited Series	The Defiant Ones	Won	
2018	Motion Picture Sound Editors	Outstanding Achievement in Sound Editing – Sound Effects, Foley, Music, Dialogue and ADR for Non-Theatrical Animated Long Form Broadcast Media	The Defiant Ones	Nominated	
2018	MTV Movie & TV Awards	Best Music Documentary	The Defiant Ones	Nominated	
