= Rapped in Romance =

Studio album by World Class Wreckin' Cru
- Released: May 9, 1986
- Recorded: 1985–1986
- Studio: Audio Achievements Inc. (California)
- Genres: Electronic; hip-hop
- Length: 41:14
- Label: Epic
- Producers: Larkin Arnold (exec.); Lonzo; Dr. Dre; DJ Yella; Shakespere

World Class Wreckin' Cru chronology
| World Class (1985) | Rapped in Romance (1986) |

Rapped in Romance is the second and final studio album by American Los Angeles–based electro-hop group the World Class Wreckin' Cru. It was released in 1986 on Epic. Cli-N-Tel left the group during the fall of 1985 which led to Lonzo recruiting Shakespeare to join the group.

After this album, Dr. Dre and DJ Yella left the group, leading to the formation of gangsta rap group N.W.A, while Lonzo Williams would form a new Wreckin Cru and enjoy some moderate mainstream success with the song "Turn Off The Lights".

== Track listing ==
| No. | Title | Writer(s) | Producer(s) | Length |
|---|---|---|---|---|
| 1. | "Mission Possible" | Alonzo Williams; Andre Young; Barry Severe | Lonzo; Dr. Dre (co.); DJ Yella (co.) | 5:32 |
| 2. | "He's Bionic" | Young; Severe | Dr. Dre; Lonzo (co.); Shakespere (co.) | 4:04 |
| 3. | "B.S." | Severe; Young; Williams | Dr. Dre; Lonzo | 5:08 |
| 4. | "Love Letter" | Williams | Lonzo | 5:22 |
| 5. | "The Fly" | Williams; Severe; Young | Lonzo; Shakespere (co.) | 5:06 |
| 6. | "World Class Freak" | Williams; Severe | Lonzo; Dr. Dre (co.); DJ Yella (co.) | 4:06 |
| 7. | "Wreckin' Cru Blues" | Williams; Young | Lonzo; Dr. Dre (co.) | 6:58 |
| 8. | "Masters of Romance" | Williams; Young; Severe; Antoine Carraby | Lonzo; DJ Yella (co.) | 6:36 |
| Total length: | | | | 41:14 |

== Personnel ==
- Alonzo Williams – vocals, producer, mixing
- Andre Young – vocals, producer, drum programming, keyboards, scratches, mixing
- Antoine Carraby – vocals, co-producer, drum programming, keyboards, percussion, scratches, mixing
- Bernard Severe – vocals, co-producer, keyboards, mixing
- Mona Lisa Young – vocals
- Keypunch – keyboards
- Larkin Arnold – executive producer
- Bernie Grundman – mastering
- Donovan Smith – mixing
- Penny Wolin – photography
