= Rhyon Nicole Brown =

American actress, singer, and dancer

- Occupations: Actress, singer, dancer
- Years active: 1999–present
- Relatives: RaVaughn (sister)

Rhyon Nicole Brown is an American actress, singer, and dancer.

== Career ==
She made her film debut in Santa & Pete (1999) And has since appeared in various television shows. Brown has had recurring roles on shows such as That's So Raven as Madison, on Judging Amy as Rebecca Van Exel, and most recently a starring role on the ABC Family TV series Lincoln Heights as Lizzie Sutton. In 2005, she appeared in 50 Cent's semi-biographical film, Get Rich or Die Tryin' as the younger version of 50 Cent's love interest Charlene. Brown also stars as R&B singer Michel'le in the 2016 Lifetime movie Surviving Compton: Dre, Suge & Michel'le.

Brown is best known for her role as Elizabeth "Lizzie" Sutton on the ABC Family series, Lincoln Heights ran from 2007 to 2009.

== Filmography ==
=== Film ===
Year	Title	Role	Notes
1999	Santa and Pete	Julia	
2004	Earthquake	Sharisse	TV movie
2005	Get Rich or Die Tryin'	Young Charlene	
2006	The Adventures of Brer Rabbit	Janey (voice)	Video
2016	Surviving Compton: Dre, Suge & Michel'le	Michel'le	TV movie
2018	Throwback Holiday	Rosalyn "Rosie" Ross	
2019	Killers Anonymous	Alice	
2019	Unseen	Carly	Short
2021	A Christmas Stray	Foster	TV movie
2022	Rolling Into Christmas	Deja Franks	TV movie

=== Television ===
Year	Title	Role	Notes
1999–2004	Judging Amy	Rebecca Van Exel	Recurring cast: season 1–5
2000	Providence	Fiona	Episode: "Love is in the Air"
2000	The Geena Davis Show	Little Girl	Episode: "The Long Kiss Goodbye"
2000	ER	Wendy	Episode: "The Greatest of Gifts"
2001	My Wife and Kids	Melaline	Episode: "The Truth Hurts"
2001	Everybody Loves Raymond	Grace	Episode: "The Angry Family"
2002	Girlfriends	Lily	Episode: "I Have a Dream House"
2002	Boston Public	Tanya Lipschultz	Episode: "Chapter Forty" & "Chapter Fifty-Two"
2002	The Ellen Show	The Little Girl	Episode: "Shallow Gal"
2002–03	Hidden Hills	Amanda Timmerman	Recurring cast
2003	ER	Erika Crawford	Episode: "Shifts Happen"
2003	Two and a Half Men	Ashley	Episode: "Twenty-five Little Pre-pubers Without a Snoot-ful"
2003	One on One	Angela	Episode: "It's a Miserable Life"
2003–04	The Bernie Mac Show	Chrissie	Episode: "Eye of the Tiger" & "The Talk"
2004–06	That's So Raven	Madison	Guest: season 2, recurring cast: season 3
2006	7th Heaven	Angelica	Episode: "Christmas!"
2007	Numb3rs	Lucy Fuñes Moreno	Episode: "The Art of Reckoning"
2007–09	Lincoln Heights	Elizabeth "Lizzie" Sutton	Main cast
2008	In Plain Sight	Lily McBride	Episode: "Iris Doesn't Live Here Anymore"
2015	Tyler Perry's For Better or Worse	Pam	Recurring cast: season 4
2015	Eight Crazy Dates	Taylor	Main cast
2017	Tales	Germaine	Episode: "99 Problems"
2018–20	Empire	Maya	Recurring cast: season 4, main cast: season 5-6
2020	BoJack Horseman	-	Episode: "The Horny Unicorn"
2021–22	Our Kind of People	Lauren Dupont	Main cast
2022	Santiago of the Seas	Anani	Guest starring
