= 2024 California City mayoral election =

Local mayoral election

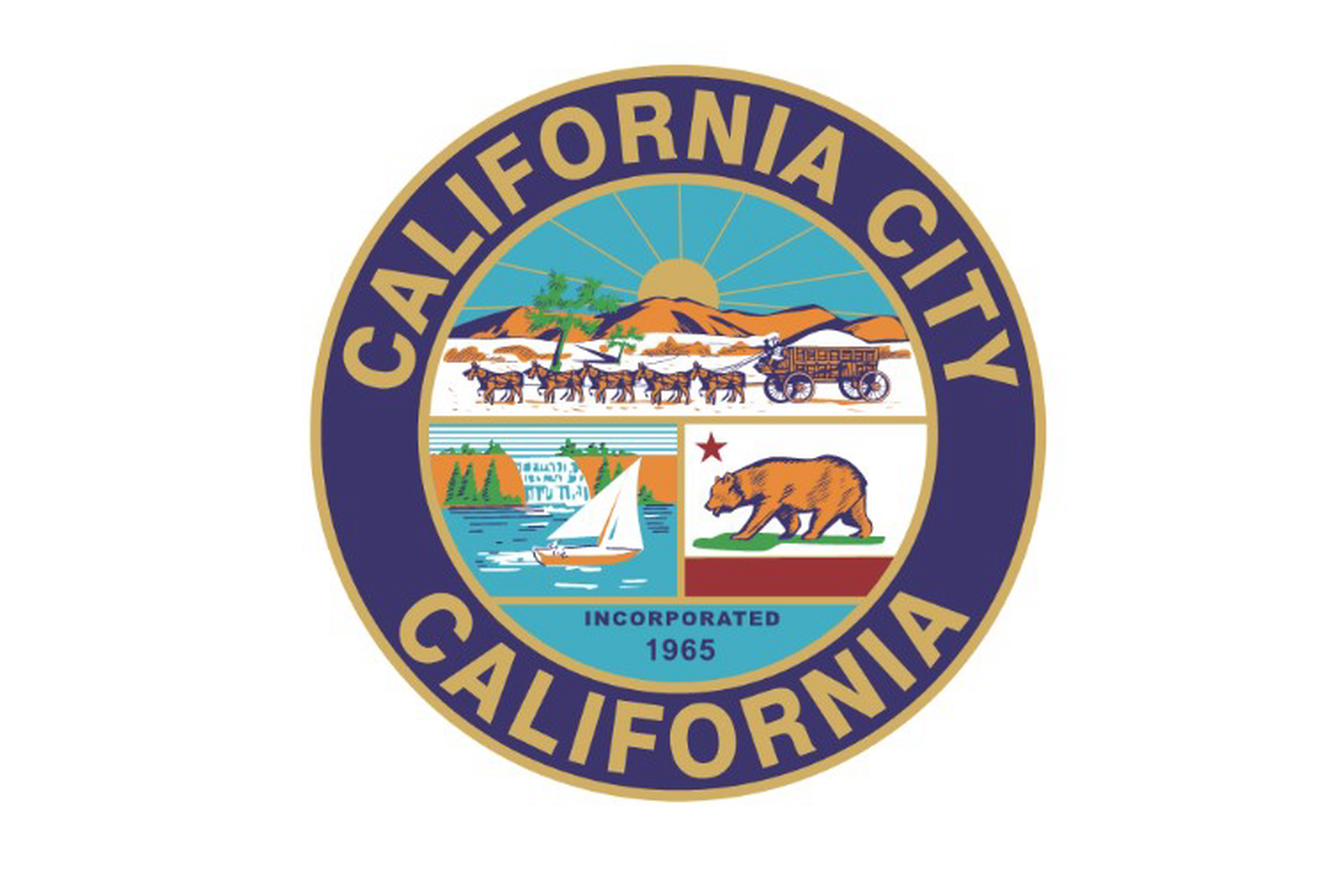
- November 5, 2024
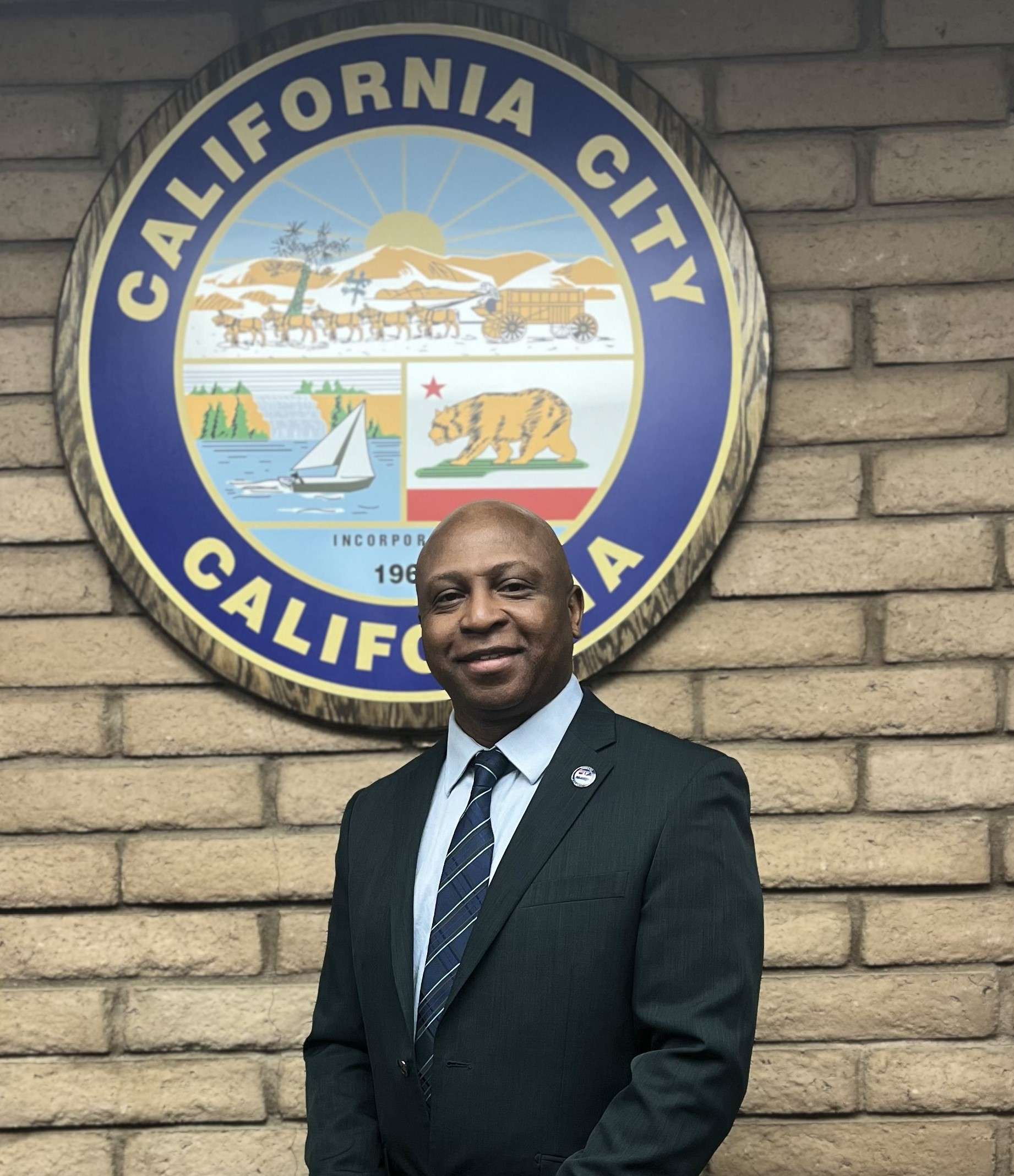

Candidate	Marquette Hawkins	Duane Vasquez	Kelly Kulikoff
Party	Nonpartisan	Nonpartisan	Nonpartisan
Popular vote	1,637	1,357	777
Percentage	43.41%	35.99%	20.60%
Mayor before election
Kelly Kulikoff
Nonpartisan
Elected mayor
Marq Hawkins
Nonpartisan

The 2024 California City mayoral election was held on November 5, 2024, to elect the Mayor of California City, California. It saw the election of Marquette Hawkins, who unseated incumbent mayor Kelly Kulikoff.

== Candidates ==
- Kelly Kulikoff, incumbent mayor
- Duane Vasquez, community leader
- Marquette Hawkins, educator and composer

== Results ==
Results
Candidate	Votes	%
Marquette Hawkins	1,637	43.4
Duane Vasquez	1,357	36.0
Kelly Kulikoff (incumbent)	777	20.6
Total votes	3,771	100.0
