= Marquette Hawkins =

American rapper, producer and politician

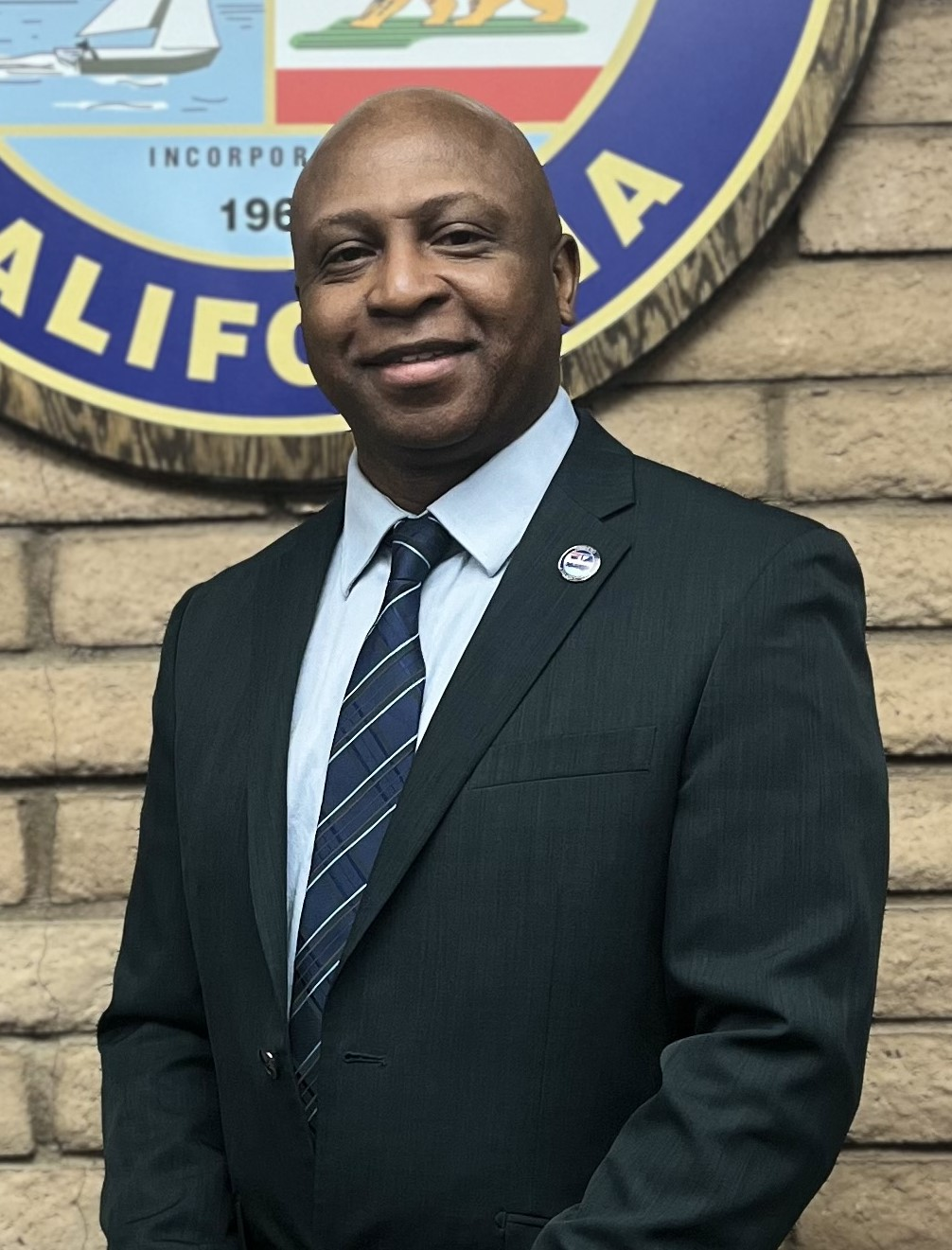
- Official portrait, 2025

Mayor of California City
- Incumbent
- Assumed office December 5, 2024
- Preceded by: Kelly Kulikoff

Personal details
- Born: Los Angeles, California, U.S.
- Party: Independent
- Education: California State University, Fullerton (BA); University of Phoenix (MA); National University (PhD)
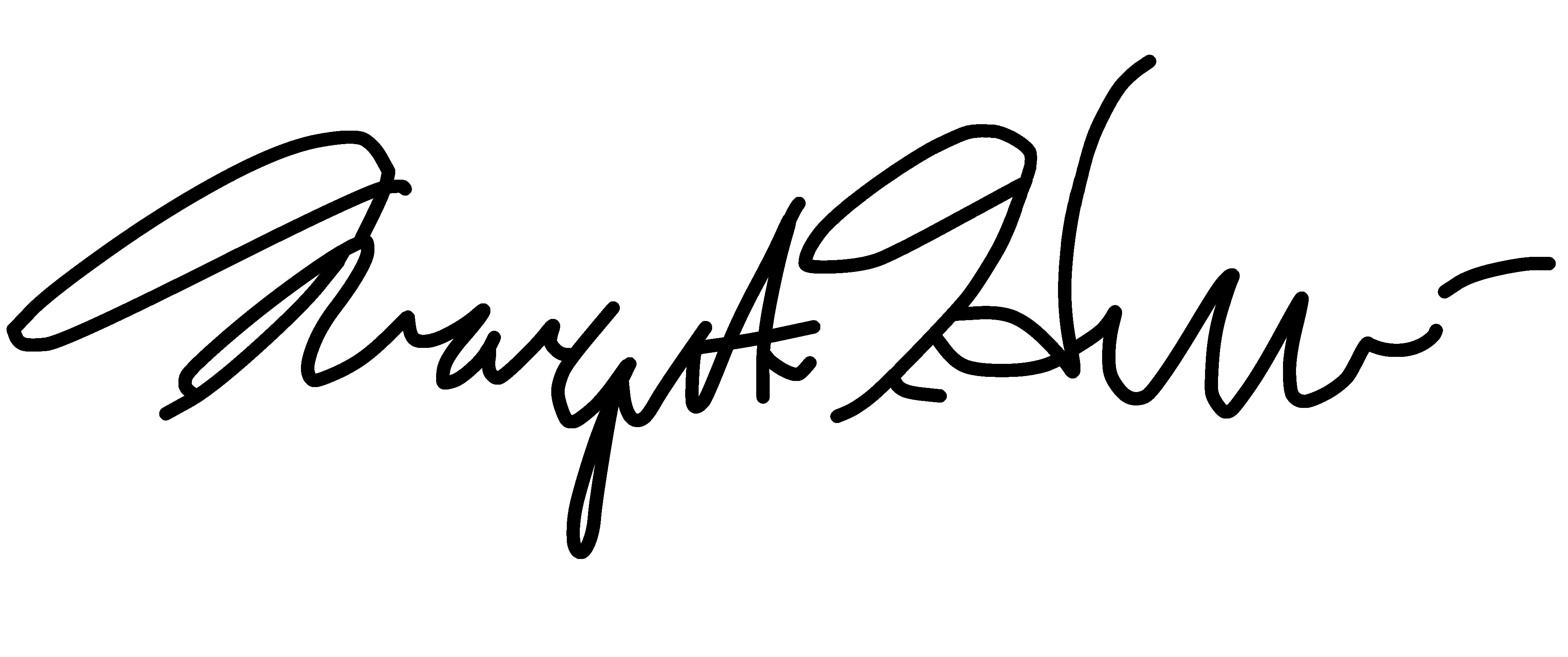
- Signature
- Website: Campaign website; Music website

Marquette "Marq" Hawkins, also known professionally as DJ Cli-N-Tel, is an American rapper, music producer, professor, and politician currently serving as the Mayor of California City, California since 2024. Hawkins was elected in the 2024 California City mayoral election. He is a former member of hip-hop group World Class Wreckin' Cru with Dr. Dre.

== Early life and education ==
Hawkins was a child actor at six months old, appearing on at least one television show. He also acted in school as well as church plays. He was influenced by Miss L. Brown, the English and drama teacher at his junior high, Vanguard Junior High School in Compton, California, to act in a school play called As Sure As You're Born. He won Best Supporting Actor for his role when the play was taken to a city-wide competition. Following this, Hawkins begged his mother to take him on auditions. However, upon hearing "Rapper's Delight" for the first time, Hawkins felt he wanted to pursue rap. From there, he and his friends formed a group and entered into talent shows. Hawkins's friend would tap dance, Hawkins's cousin would beatbox, and Hawkins would rap over the beat. The group was so successful that when Hawkins entered high school, he formed a DJ crew, called the Invasion Force, and his own production company, Diamond Star Productions. Eventually the crew entered a contest at Eve After Dark, a teen nightclub run by Lonzo Williams. When the group won a $100 prize, Williams offered to help Hawkins create a record with himself and other young men from the area, including Andre Young and DJ Yella. This was the inception of Hawkins's involvement with the World Class Wreckin' Cru with Dr. Dre. Hawkins was a writer on all seven tracks to the group's debut album, World Class. During this time, Hawkins mentored a young Ice Cube and Sir Jinx, teaching them how to rap.

After leaving World Class Wreckin' Cru, Hawkins started his own label, his own film production company for music video work, and began writing scripts. In 1994, Hawkins was a producer on Concrete Roots, a compilation album by Dr. Dre.

Hawkins attended California State University, Fullerton and earned a Bachelor of Arts in Ethnic Studies. He later earned a Master's in Education from the University of Phoenix. He then earned his doctor of philosophy degree,PhD from National University in Organizational Leadership.

=== Activism ===
As a youth, Hawkins participated in sit-ins, marches, and community organizing events. He was a participant in the U.S. Naval Sea Cadets as well as Boy Scouts.

In 2001, Hawkins and other young men from the industry, including KRS-One, Minister Server, and Kurtis Blow, authored the International Hip-Hop Declaration of Peace, a document meant to interrupt the rap and hip-hop violence that had emerged in the late 1980s and 1990s. It was presented to UNESCO and the United Nations.

== Career ==
Hawkins worked as a teacher and professor and served on school councils and cultural advisory boards before running for mayor of California City. He was an adjunct professor at California College of Arizona State University and a member of the faculty at LA Film School.

== Personal life ==
Hawkins is a father.

== Electoral history ==
2024 California City mayoral election
Candidate	Votes	%
Marquette Hawkins	1,637	43.4
Duane Vasquez	1,357	36.0
Kelly Kulikoff (incumbent)	777	20.6
Total votes	3,771	100.0
