= World Class =

Studio album by World Class Wreckin' Cru
- Released: August 4, 1985
- Studio: Audio Achievements (Torrance, CA)
- Genre: Electronic; hip house
- Length: 43:42
- Label: Kru-Cut Records
- Producer: Lonzo; Dr. Dre; DJ Yella; Cli-N-Tel

World Class Wreckin' Cru chronology
World Class (1985)	Rapped in Romance (1986)

World Class is the first studio album by American Los Angeles-based electro-hop group World Class Wreckin' Cru. It was released in 1985 under the Kru-Cut record label. Songs on the album included "Juice" and "Surgery", which were popular singles on the underground West Coast scene.

The album cover was used as a form of ridicule to Dr. Dre in Eazy-E's diss song "Real Muthaphuckkin G's" showing the album images of Dr. Dre on the album wearing flashy clothing and makeup. The style was later attributed to the fashion sense of Prince which was heavily popular at the time. It was also parodied by Luther Campbell on the song "Cowards Of Compton".

== Track listing ==
All songs produced by Lonzo & The Wreckin Cru.

No.	Title	Writer(s)	Length
1.	"Planet"	Hawkins; Andre Young	8:07
2.	"World Class"	Hawkins; Young	5:03
3.	"Surgery" (Remix)	Antoine Carraby; Hawkins; Young	5:12
4.	"Juice" (Edited version)	Hawkins; Alonzo Williams; Young; Carraby	4:13
5.	"(Horney) Computer"	Williams; Hawkins; Carraby	7:14
6.	"Gang Bang You're Dead"	Williams; Hawkins; Carraby	6:25
7.	"Lovers" (featuring Mona Lisa Young)	Hawkins; Carraby; Williams; Young	7:28
Total length:			43:42

== Personnel ==
- Alonzo Williams - vocals, bass, producer
- Andre Young - vocals, drum programming, producer
- Antoine Carraby - vocals, drum programming, producer
- Marquette Hawkins - vocals, keyboards, producer
- Mona Lisa Young - vocals
- Bernie Grundman - mastering
- Donovan Smith - engineer
- Don MacMillan - art direction
- Duane Blanks - hair styles
