= C.I.A. (band) =

American hip-hop group (1986–1987)

- Also known as: Criminals' in Action!, Stereo Crew
- Origin: Los Angeles, California, U.S.
- Genres: Hip-hop
- Years active: 1986–1987
- Label: Kru-Cut
- Past members: Ice Cube; K-Dee; Sir Jinx

C.I.A., a name short for Cru’In Action!, replacing the earlier name Stereo Crew, was an American hip-hop trio, K-Dee, Sir Jinx, and Ice Cube, on the Los Angeles rap scene in the 1980s. The trio debuted at parties thrown by Sir Jinx's cousin Dr. Dre. Dre was in one of the Los Angeles area's leading DJ crews, the World Class Wreckin' Cru, whose core members, including Dre, doubled as a successful electro rap group. In 1986, the Stereo Crew's single "She's a Skag" arrived on Epic Records, which soon dropped the group for poor sales.

The Stereo Crew then signed with Kru Cut Records—a sublabel run by Grandmaster Lonzo, who, leading the World Class Wreckin' Cru, had formed it for the WCWC's early releases—while the trio changed its name to C.I.A. The trio did backing vocals on the WCWC song "Cabbage Patch," while C.I.A.'s only release, "My Posse," produced by Dre in a classic, Roland TR-808 manner, arrived in 1987. Meanwhile, Eric Wright, soon dubbed Eazy-E, having a new label, Ruthless Records, formed with Cube and Dre the pioneering gangsta rap group N.W.A.

== Discography ==
=== Singles ===
- "She's a Skag" (1986) (as Stereo Crew)
- "My Posse" (1986)
