= Dee Barnes =

American rapper

- Also known as: D Zire; Sista D
- Born: Denise Barnes
- Genres: Hip-hop; reggae; ska; R&B; soul
- Occupations: Rapper; TV host
- Years active: 1988–present
- Label: Delicious Vinyl
- Formerly of: Body & Soul

Denise "Dee" Barnes (stage names Sista D and D Zire) is an American rapper and former Fox television personality who performed in the West Coast hip-hop female duo Body & Soul and hosted a radio show on KDAY, prior to gaining wider fame as the host of Fox's hip hop show Pump It Up!, a weekly FOX TV rap music series on air from 1989-1992, according to IMDb.

On January 27, 1991, she was physically assaulted by Dr. Dre at a rap industry party. Barnes pressed criminal charges and filed a lawsuit; Dre pled no contest to the charges and settled the suit out of court. He issued a public apology years later, but did not specifically direct it to the targets of his abuse, including artist Michel'le: "I apologize to the women I've hurt. I deeply regret what I did and know that it has forever impacted all of our lives." Barnes plans on writing a biography of her life, according to a 2019 VIBE Magazine article.

== Biography ==
Barnes grew up in New York City and became interested in hip-hop after hearing older children practicing in the park and attending concerts at the local roller rink, including a performance by Davy D. She began working in radio as an intern for The DJ Red Alert show on 98.7 Kiss FM; after graduating from high school, Barnes moved to Los Angeles in the late 1980s and joined Greg Mack on 1580 KDAY.

She formed the duo Body & Soul with her friend Rose Hutchinson (aka Rose Almight-T) in Los Angeles; the group's 1989 debut single "Dance to the Drummer's Beat", released on Los Angeles-based record label Delicious Vinyl, heavily sampled the Herman Kelly and Life song of the same name. Its b-side, "Hi-Powered", was produced by Def Jef. The same year, Body & Soul released "We Can Do This", also produced by Def Jef, on the label showcase This Is Delicious – Eat to the Beat. The duo also appear on the 1990 soundtrack of Marked for Death with "Ya Get's None". Body & Soul's greatest recording would apparently be their last; they recorded the 1990 posse cut "We're All in the Same Gang" as part of the Dr. Dre-produced West Coast Rap All-Stars, which earned that group a Grammy Award nomination. Barnes recalled that Body & Soul struggled with the record label for image and creative control, as the label "wanted us to be more body than soul" while they felt "sex, relationships and maybe heartbreak [are] not [exclusively] what women are about"; they had an unreleased album which was being produced by the Jungle Brothers.

Also in 1989, at the age of 19, she was hired to host Pump It Up! for the new Fox television network, a show where she interviewed artists which she described as having a guerilla style. At the time she was seeking a record deal, she also was attending journalism school. Barnes later said she felt a responsibility to document the developing history of rap and hip-hop. After an episode aired in November 1990 which featured interviews with both N.W.A and Ice Cube, Dr. Dre physically beat Barnes at a party in January 1991 in front of hundreds; the show ended later in 1991.

This is bigger than me, and bigger than hip-hop. This is about respect and awareness. As a result of speaking on my personal experience with violence, I have been vilified. Women survivors of violence are expected neither to be seen nor heard, and the pressure increases when it involves celebrities. No one wants to see their heroes criticized. And if they are African American, the community at large becomes suspicious of an underlying motive to tear down a successful black man. Excusing pop culture icons from scrutiny over their history of violence against women because they are elevated to "hero" status is wrong on so many levels. Creating notable, brilliant art does not absolve you of your faults. In the past, great art was enough to exalt men of their bad behavior, but in 2015 it's no longer the case. Survivors have a right and an obligation to speak up (#NoSilenceOnDomesticViolence). We are too loud, too correct, too numerous to be ignored.

— Dee Barnes, Gawker (August 24, 2015)

On February 14, 1991, Barnes co-hosted The Motherlode with Fab 5 Freddy; it was a concert at the Los Angeles Sports Arena, the first to feature an all-woman rap revue. That fall, Barnes hosted the hip-hop special Sisters in the Name of Rap, a revue of live performances taped at The Ritz in New York on October 8, 1991, which aired on pay-per-view, then was released as a 75-minute VHS tape by PolyGram in 1992. The show also featured an all-female line up including the artists Queen Latifah and MC Lyte.

Dr. Dre pleaded no contest to misdemeanor battery charges in August 1991; Pump It Up! was cancelled shortly after that. Unsubstantiated allegations were made that Barnes had filed the civil lawsuit because Dre refused to promote Body & Soul, and she had difficulty resuming both her music and journalism careers. In 2017, she recounted "I called the police on Mr. Fuck the Police. But little by little the work started drying up. It was as if I had ruined his career by being that disturbing footnote in his legacy."

In 2017, she appeared in the second episode of the television miniseries The Defiant Ones, which documented the lives and producing careers of Dr. Dre and Jimmy Iovine.

In March 2019, it was reported that Barnes was facing financial difficulties and was "officially homeless". She stated on the Wendy Williams show on April 18, 2019, that she had raised $25,000 from a GoFundMe account.

After the 65th Annual Grammy Awards, in which Dr. Dre won the Global Impact Award and named it for him, she called him an abuser: "... to name an award after someone with that type of history in the music industry, you might as well call it the 'Ike Turner Award'. [... Dre] said it himself in the documentary The Defiant Ones: I'm a 'blemish' on who he is as a man. Well, what do you do with a blemish? There's a whole industry created—skincare lines and vitamins and rituals—to get rid of blemishes. And, in a sense, there's a whole network to keep me hidden."

== 1991 assault ==
According to Barnes, a producer for Pump It Up! combined interviews with N.W.A and Ice Cube in the same episode that first aired in November 1990; at the time, N.W.A and Cube were feuding over his 1989 departure from the group. Barnes had conducted an interview with N.W.A that October, and was interviewing Yo-Yo on the set of Boyz N the Hood a week later when Ice Cube interrupted the interview with some comments about N.W.A, and afterward, Barnes quipped on camera "Sister Dee, always in the middle of controversy right here on Pump It Up!". The cameraman for that interview was F. Gary Gray, who went on to direct the N.W.A biopic Straight Outta Compton. This was shortly after N.W.A had dissed Ice Cube with their 100 Miles and Runnin' album. Portions of the clips from that episode of Pump It Up! are shown in the second episode of The Defiant Ones. Dee Barnes said in the episode that there was a bad energy in the interview with N.W.A and every answer seemed to involve a diss to Ice Cube. In production, this was then combined with Barnes's subsequent interview with Ice Cube in which he dissed N.W.A and also cruelly mimicked The DOC's voice, shortly after a near-fatal accident. This caused great offense to Dr. Dre, who was a close friend of The DOC.

On January 27, 1991, just before she turned 23, Dr. Dre encountered Barnes at a record release party for Bytches With Problems at the Po Na Na Souk club in Hollywood. According to Barnes, he picked her up by her hair, unprovoked, and "began slamming her head and the right side of her body repeatedly against a brick wall near the stairway" as his bodyguard held off the crowd with a gun. After Dr. Dre tried to throw her down the stairs and failed, he began kicking her in the ribs and hands. She escaped and ran into the women's restroom. Dr. Dre followed her and "grabbed her from behind by the hair again and proceeded to punch her in the back of the head". Finally, Dre and his bodyguard ran from the building.

N.W.A. promoter Doug Young claims that he attempted to intervene to restrain Dr. Dre, but that he was punched in the mouth by Dr. Dre's bodyguard.

=== Lawsuit and charges ===
In February 1991, Barnes pressed criminal charges against Dr. Dre, who pleaded no contest to misdemeanor battery in August 1991; he was fined US$2,513 (equivalent to $5,940 in 2025) and sentenced to 240 hours of community service by Judge Frederick Wapner, with two years probation. In addition, he was ordered to produce an anti-violence public service announcement.

That June, Barnes filed a $22.75 million lawsuit against Dr. Dre and several members of N.W.A., as reported by the Los Angeles Times, accusing Dr. Dre of assault and battery and emotional distress; the others were accused of libel, slander, and emotional distress. She provided a deposition of that night's events that July. The lawsuit was settled out of court in 1993, reportedly for "six figures".

=== Reactions ===
The other members of N.W.A. defended Dr. Dre. In September 1991, Eazy-E made light of the incident during an interview with SPIN. N.W.A.'s MC Ren later said "bitch deserved it" and Eazy-E echoed with "yeah, bitch had it coming". As Dr. Dre explained the incident: "People talk all this shit, but you know, somebody fuck with me, I'm gonna fuck with them. I just did it, you know. Ain't nothing you can do now by talking about it. Besides, it ain't no big thing—I just threw her through a door." Barnes sued in February 1991, telling reporter Alan Light: "They've grown up with the mentality that it's okay to hit women, especially black women. Now there's a lot of kids listening and thinking it's okay to hit women who get out of line."

Some others condemned the incident. Jerry Heller, then manager of N.W.A, called the incident "disgraceful" in his book and said that he was "left to clean up the mess" afterward. He claimed that Dr. Dre was generally non-violent and that the attack was a result of excess drinking. The New York rapper Tim Dog threatened Dr. Dre on the song Fuck Compton with the lyrics Dre, beating on Dee from Pump It Up / Step to the Dog and get fucked up. Chuck D called the assault "foul" in an interview with Greg Tate, published by The Village Voice in October 1991.

Dr. Dre produced and is featured in rapper Eminem's 1999 song "Guilty Conscience", in which Eminem references the incident as a humorous put-down, characterizing it as a slap. Dre reportedly fell out of his chair laughing at it.

=== Apologies ===
Twenty-four years later, Dr. Dre made apologies in 2015 "to the women I've hurt", just before the release of the film Straight Outta Compton. Rolling Stone published a cover article in which he said "I made some fucking horrible mistakes in my life. I was young, fucking stupid. I would say all the allegations aren't true—some of them are. Those are some of the things that I would like to take back. It was really fucked up. But I paid for those mistakes, and there's no way in hell that I will ever make another mistake like that again." In The New York Times, he added "Twenty-five years ago I was a young man drinking too much and in over my head with no real structure in my life. However, none of this is an excuse for what I did. I've been married for 19 years and every day I'm working to be a better man for my family, seeking guidance along the way. I'm doing everything I can so I never resemble that man again. [...] I apologize to the women I've hurt. I deeply regret what I did and know that it has forever impacted all of our lives."

However, neither apology mentions Barnes or his ex-girlfriend, musician Michel'le, directly. The incident was not included in the film; the draft screenplay did include a fictionalized version of it, wherein a visibly drunk Dr. Dre argues with and beats Barnes after she throws a drink in his face. When asked about the "glaring omission" of the assault on Barnes, director Gray said "We had to focus on the story that was pertinent to our main characters." Barnes criticized the film for depicting N.W.A and its members as "trying to stay hard, and look like good guys", noting in a separate essay that "It's only after the drink is thrown that the Dre character retaliates with physical violence. That is a fabrication intended to excuse his actions." However, she added that "Dre stepped up and performed his social responsibility by finally taking accountability for his actions. Who cares why he apologized? The point is that he did."

In The Defiant Ones (2017), Dre elaborated on the incident, admitting to excessive drinking at the time:

This was a very low point in my life. I've done a lot of stupid shit in my life. A lot of things I wish I could go and take back. I've experienced abuse. I've watched my mother get abused. So there's absolutely no excuse for it. No woman should ever be treated that way.

Any man that puts his hands on a female is a fucking idiot. He is out of his fucking mind and I was out of my fucking mind at the time. I fucked up. I paid for it. I'm sorry for it and I apologized for it. I have this dark cloud that follows me and it's gonna be attached to me forever. It's a major blemish on who I am as a man.

And every time it comes up, it just makes me feel fucked up. So it's just like, what do I do? What do I do to get rid of this dark cloud? I don't know what else to do. I'm learning. I'm trying to become a better person, become a better man. In the end, I've hurt people that I care about. And for that, I'm really sorry.
