= DJ Alonzo Williams =

American DJ and music promoter

Alonzo Williams
- Born: Alonzo Williams
- Origin: Compton, California, U.S.
- Years active: 1979–present
- Formerly of: World Class Wreckin' Cru

Alonzo Williams is an American DJ and former member and promoter of the World Class Wreckin' Cru. He is credited for playing a major role in the development of West Coast hip-hop, tracing back to the late 1970s. He is also the former owner of Kru-Cut Records.

== World Class Wreckin' Cru ==
By 1979, Alonzo was already one of the most popular DJs in the Los Angeles area. He began producing dances under the name of Disco Construction, named after funk group Brass Construction. Seeing the popularity of this new craze, he entered the market of running nightclub performances. The World Class Wreckin' Cru debuted in a club owned by Lonzo. The club "Eve After Dark" opened with Detroit-born Andre Manuel aka Unknown DJ directing the music program whose main influence derived from an East Coast flavour such as the Soulsonic Force, Orbit and Scorpio.

As the 1980s arrived, so did electronic funk, sampling drum beats fused with old-school rap format. Disco Construction created a sub-group called the Wreckin' Cru which were the Lonzos roadies and later added World Class it became the name of the recording group. Lonzo hired local DJs Antoine "Yella" Carraby and Andre "Dr. Dre" Young who later became the original Mix Masters for KDAY. The Wreckin' Cru performed in various shows around L.A. including opening for New Edition as well as multiple shows promoted by Lonzo.

The Wreckin' Cru's first releases were the singles "Slice" followed by "Surgery". That same year, they released their debut album World Class, all released through Lonzo's label Kru-Cut. The success of their early releases led to a major record deal with CBS/Epic Records. With this, the group released a string of new singles and a second album entitled Rapped in Romance.

After being signed to CBS records, Lonzo was asked if he had any other acts. After seeing Dre's cousin Jinx's group perform in a rap contest, a teenage group called C.I.A. (Cru' In Action) starring O'Shea "Ice Cube" Jackson, Dre’s cousin Tony ‘Sir Jinx’ Wheaton and Darrell ‘K-Dee’ Johnson, who with Dre would record a demo tape called "She's a Skag". The group was then signed to a single deal with CBS.

The Wreckin Cru signed to CBS in 1986 along with C.I.A. After being released from CBS, the WCWC went on to have their biggest hit ever "Turn off The Lights" which peaked at #54 on the Billboard Black Singles Charts. WCWC which was primarily known as a dance and romance act released many locally successful songs including "Surgery," "Juice," "Cabbage Patch," and "Lovers during their tenure.

== Subsequent career ==
After the Wreckin' Cru split up, Lonzo, now a solo artist released another LP, titled Phases in Life, in 1990 but has not released anything new since.
