= World Class Wreckin' Cru =

American electro, R&B and hip hop group

- World Class Wreckin' Cru in 1985

Background information
- Also known as: The Cru; The World Cru Bangers
- Origin: Compton, California, U.S.
- Genres: Electro; hip hop; R&B
- Years active: 1983–1987; 1990–1991
- Labels: Kru-Cut; Epic; Macola
- Past members: DJ Alonzo Williams; Shakespeare; Dr. Dre; Dr. Rock; The Unknown DJ; Cli-N-Tel; Michel'le; DJ Yella; Mona Lisa; Steel Neil; Winnie Wee

World Class Wreckin' Cru was an American electro group, during the 1980s in the Los Angeles area, that contributed to rap's development. Two of its members, Dr. Dre and DJ Yella, attained greater fame as members of N.W.A, which pioneered gangsta rap. A song by the Cru had also featured R&B singer Michel'le.

== Early career ==
World Class Wreckin' Cru debuted in the nightclub Eve After Dark, owned by Alonzo Williams, an early West Coast DJ very popular in the Los Angeles area. In the 1970s, Williams had begun producing dance songs under the name Disco Construction, named after funk group Brass Construction. At his songs' popularity, Williams arranged nightclub performances. Initially directing its music program was Detroit-born Andre "Unknown DJ" Manuel (who would later join Comptons Most Wanted), who was influenced by East Coast sounds, like Soulsonic Force, Orbit, and Scorpio.

As the 1980s opened, electronic funk arrived, sampling drum beats and borrowing from old-school rap. Disco Construction created a subgroup, the Wreckin' Cru, which was the Lonzos' roadies. Later, this honorific prefix World Class signified a recording group. Lonzo hired two local DJs—Antoine "Yella" Carraby and Andre "Dr. Dre" Young—who became the original "Mix Masters" for Los Angeles radio station KDAY. The Wreckin' Cru performed in various shows elsewhere in Los Angeles, including shows promoted by Lonzo as well as opening for New Edition.

== Success and break up ==
Alonzo Williams created the label "Kru-cut" which began releasing The Wreckin' Cru music through the mid-1980s with very minimal resources through Macola Records, a local independent record manufacturing and distributing company. The Cru released the single "Slice", followed by "Surgery". By 1985 Kru-Cut had produced World Class’ debut album, World Class. The success of their early releases led to a major record deal with CBS/Epic Records. With Cli-N-Tel leaving after the first album to control his own direction in life, this left Shakespeare to step up to be the prominent MC as they signed with Epic Records. With this they released a string of singles and also their second album, Rapped in Romance.

After being signed to CBS records, Lonzo was asked if he had any other acts. After seeing Dre's cousin Jinx's group perform in a rap contest, a teenage group called C.I.A. (Cru in Action) starring O'Shea "Ice Cube" Jackson, Dre's cousin Tony "Sir Jinx" Wheaton and Darrell "K-Dee" Johnson, who with Dre would record a demo tape called "She's a Skag". The group was then signed to a single deal with CBS.

After being released from CBS, in April 1986 , the Wreckin’ Cru featuring Michel'le, Dre's girlfriend, released their hit slow jam "Turn off the Lights" peaked at #54 on the Billboard Black Singles Charts. This was the WCWC biggest hit. WCWC which was primarily known as a dance and romance act released many locally successful songs including "Surgery," "Juice," "Cabbage Patch," and "Lovers during their tenure.

At this time, Dre was working on side projects for local entrepreneur Eric "Eazy-E" Wright in the Kru-Cut studio, and Ice Cube was ghostwriting for the World Class single "House Calls/Cabbage Patch" in 1986. The last time Dre was arrested and jailed for missed court appearances on multiple traffic violations was in 1986, when he owed $166, enough for an arrest warrant, and Lonzo refused to bail him out a third time. Eazy-E posted it in return for Dre's production for E's new record label, Ruthless Records. Eazy, Dre and Cube’s combined collaboration of talent then formed N.W.A. As a solo artist, Lonzo released another LP, titled Phases in Life, in 1990. World Class member Shakespeare sought to become a pastor.

== Discography ==
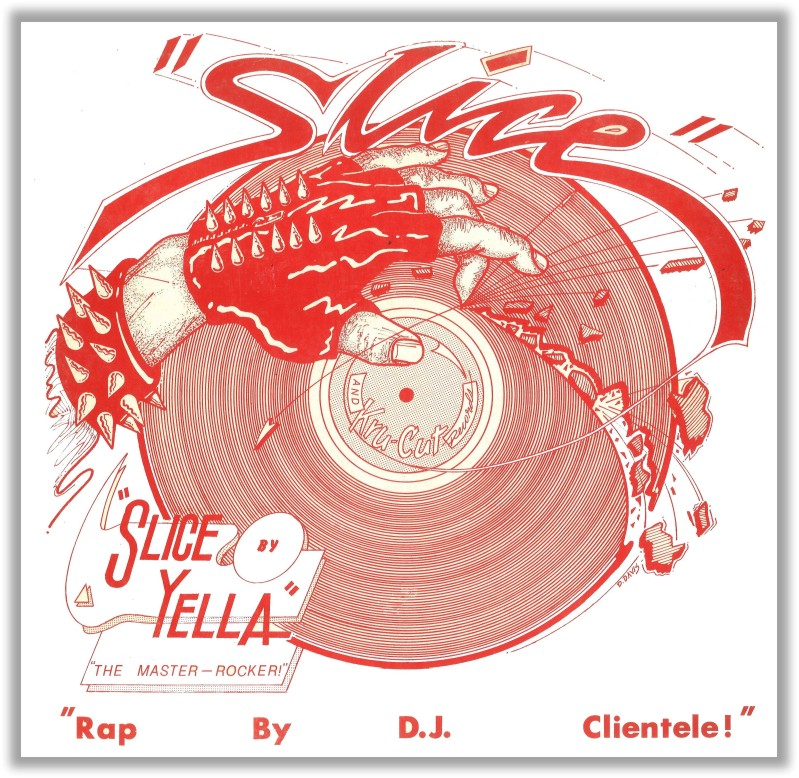
Album cover for the group's debut single "Slice" featuring DJ Yella

=== Albums ===
- World Class (Kru-Cut, 1985)
- Rapped in Romance (Epic/CBS, 1986)

=== Singles ===
- "Slice" (Kru-Cut, 1984)
- "Surgery" (Kru-Cut, 1984)
- "Juice" (Kru-Cut, 1985)
- "House Calls/Cabbage Patch" (Kru-Cut, 1987)
- "Turn Off the Lights" (Kru-Cut, 1987)

=== Compilations ===
- The Best of the World Class Wreckin' Cru (Kru-Cut, 1987)
- Turn Off the Lights (Before The Attitude) (S.O.H., 1991)
- Dr. Dre vs. World Class Wreckin' Crew (Street Dance, 2005)
