= N.W.A discography =

- Studio albums: 2
- Extended plays: 1
- Compilation albums: 7
- Singles: 8
- Video albums: 1
- Music videos: 5

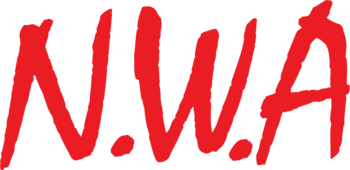
The N.W.A. script

The discography of American hip hop group N.W.A, consists of two studio albums, seven compilation albums, one extended play (EP), eight singles, one video album and five music videos. N.W.A was formed in Compton, California in 1987 by Eazy-E, Dr. Dre, Arabian Prince, and Ice Cube, with DJ Yella and MC Ren joining later. The group's first release was the compilation album N.W.A. and the Posse in 1987, which also featured songs by The D.O.C., The Fila Fresh Crew, Rappinstine, and Ron-De-Vu. Their debut album Straight Outta Compton followed in January 1989, which initially reached number 37 on the US Billboard 200; it had since reached number four, and has sold over 1.5 million copies in the US alone. "Straight Outta Compton", "Gangsta Gangsta", and "Express Yourself" were released as singles from the album, all of which registered on the Billboard Hot R&B/Hip-Hop Songs chart.

Arabian Prince left N.W.A in early 1989 due to having many royalty and financial disagreements with N.W.A's manager and Eazy-E's business partner Jerry Heller whilst Ice Cube left N.W.A in late 1989 due to similar financial disagreements. The remaining members released the EP 100 Miles and Runnin' in 1990, which reached the top ten of the Billboard Top R&B/Hip-Hop Albums chart and has since been certified platinum by the RIAA. N.W.A's final album followed in 1991, Niggaz4Life (commonly referred to backwards as Efil4Zaggin). The album's singles were "Appetite for Destruction" and "Alwayz into Somethin'", as the former song peaked at No. 26 on the Hot Rap Tracks chart. Niggaz4Life: The Only Home Video was released in 1992, featuring three music videos and previously unreleased footage. Dr. Dre left N.W.A the same year, at which point the group had essentially disbanded. Eazy-E died on March 26, 1995 a month after being diagnosed with HIV. Since the group's breakup a number of compilation albums have been released, including 1996's Greatest Hits which reached the top 50 of the Billboard 200.

== Albums ==
=== Studio albums ===
List of studio albums, with selected chart positions, sales figures and certifications
Title	Album details	Peak chart positions							Sales	Certifications
Title	Album details	US	US R&B	AUS	GER	IRL	NZ	UK	Sales	Certifications
Straight Outta Compton	Released: January 25, 1989; Label: Ruthless, Priority; Format: CD, LP, cassette, digital download	4	9	8	36	7	43	35	US: 1,500,000	RIAA: 3× Platinum; BPI: Platinum
Niggaz4Life	Released: May 28, 1991; Label: Ruthless, Priority; Format: CD, LP, cassette, digital download	1	1	—	—	—	—	25		RIAA: Platinum; BPI: Silver
"—" denotes a release that did not chart or was not released in that territory.

=== Compilation albums ===
List of compilation albums, with selected chart positions and certifications
Title	Album details	Peak chart positions								Certifications
Title	Album details	US	US Cat.	US Dig.	US R&B	AUS	IRL	NZ	UK	Certifications
N.W.A. and the Posse	Released: November 6, 1987; Label: Macola; Format: CD, LP, cassette, digital download	—	—	—	39	—	—	—	—	RIAA: Gold
Greatest Hits	Released: July 2, 1996; Label: Ruthless, Priority; Format: CD, LP, cassette, digital download	48	5	22	20	9	50	43	49	RIAA: Gold; BPI: Gold; MC: Gold; RMNZ: Gold
The N.W.A Legacy, Vol. 1: 1988–1998	Released: March 23, 1999; Label: Ruthless, Priority; Format: CD, LP, cassette, digital download	77	—	—	42	—	—	—	—	RIAA: Platinum; BPI: Silver; MC: Gold
The N.W.A Legacy, Vol. 2	Released: August 27, 2002; Label: Ruthless, Priority; Format: CD, cassette, digital download	154	—	—	38	—	—	—	—	
The Best of N.W.A: The Strength of Street Knowledge	Released: December 26, 2006; Label: Ruthless, Priority; Format: CD, LP, cassette, digital download	72	6	—	47	33	—	—	—	BPI: Gold; RMNZ: Gold
N.W.A and Their Family Tree	Released: September 30, 2008; Label: Ruthless, Priority; Format: CD, digital download	—	—	—	38	—	—	—	—	
Icon	Released: June 3, 2014; Label: Ruthless, Priority; Format: CD, digital download	—	—	—	—	—	—	—	—	
"—" denotes a release that did not chart or was not released in that territory.

== Extended plays ==
List of extended plays, with selected chart positions and certifications
Title	EP details	Peak chart positions					Certifications
Title	EP details	US	US R&B	AUS	NZ	UK	Certifications
100 Miles and Runnin'	Released: August 14, 1990; Label: Ruthless, Priority; Format: CD, LP, cassette, digital download	27	10	33	32	38	RIAA: Platinum

== Singles ==
List of singles as lead artist, with selected chart positions and certifications, showing year released and album name
Title	Year	Peak chart positions									Certifications	Album
Title	Year	US Dan.	US R&B	US Rap	AUS	CAN	IRL	NZ	UK	UK R&B	Certifications	Album
"Panic Zone"	1987	—	—	—	—	—	—	—	—	—		N.W.A and the Posse
"Gangsta Gangsta"	1988	45	91	–	141	—	—	—	70	—	RMNZ: Gold	Straight Outta Compton
"Express Yourself"	1989	38	45	2	96	—	—	—	26	13	BPI: Gold; RMNZ: Platinum	Straight Outta Compton
"100 Miles and Runnin'"	1990	—	51	2	33	—	—	32	38	—		100 Miles and Runnin'
"Alwayz into Somethin'"	1991	—	–	–	—	—	—	—	60	—		Niggaz4Life
"Appetite for Destruction"	1991	—	—	26	—	—	—	—	—	—		Niggaz4Life
"The Dayz of Wayback"	1991	—	—	–	—	—	—	—	—	—		Niggaz4Life
"Chin Check" (featuring Snoop Dogg)	1999	—	71	—	—	—	—	—	—	–	RMNZ: Platinum	Next Friday
"—" denotes a release that did not chart or was not released in that territory.

== Other charted songs ==
List of songs with selected chart positions and certifications, showing year released and album name
Title	Year	Chart peaks									Certifications	Album
Title	Year	US	US R&B	US Rap	US Dig.	AUS	CAN	IRL	UK	UK R&B	Certifications	Album
"Straight Outta Compton" (Note: Song did not appear on any chart until 2015.)	1989	38	13	9	33	—	45	63	66	—	RIAA: Platinum; BPI: Platinum; RMNZ: Platinum	Straight Outta Compton
"Fuck tha Police"	1989	—	25	20	—	49	—	—	97	22	BPI: Gold; MC: Gold; RMNZ: 2× Platinum	Straight Outta Compton

== Videos ==
=== Video albums ===
List of video albums
Title	Album details
Niggaz4Life: The Only Home Video	Released: November 2, 1992; Label: Ruthless, Priority; Format: VHS, DVD

=== Music videos ===
List of music videos, showing year released and director(s)
Title	Year	Director(s)	Ref.
"Straight Outta Compton"	1989	Rupert Wainwright	
"Express Yourself"	1989	Rupert Wainwright	
"100 Miles and Runnin'"	1990	Eric Meza	
"Appetite for Destruction"	1991	Mark Gerard	
"Alwayz into Somethin'"	1991	Mark Gerard	
"Approach to Danger"	1991	DJ Yella, Donovan Smith	

== See also ==
- List of songs recorded by N.W.A
