= List of songs recorded by N.W.A =

N.W.A was an American hip hop group from Compton, California. Formed in 1986, the group went through a number of lineup changes, and throughout its tenure featured members Eazy-E, Dr. Dre, DJ Yella, Ice Cube, Arabian Prince and MC Ren.

The first release by N.W.A was the single "Panic Zone" in 1987, which was later featured on the compilation N.W.A. and the Posse along with B-sides "Dope Man" and "8 Ball". After MC Ren was added to the lineup, the group recorded its first full-length album, Straight Outta Compton, released in January 1989. Produced by Dre and Yella, the album sold over three million copies, and featured such seminal songs as "Straight Outta Compton", "Fuck tha Police" and "Gangsta Gangsta".

Ice Cube left N.W.A in 1989, due to a number of "financial disagreements". In 1990, the group released the extended play 100 Miles and Runnin', supported by the single of the same name, which featured five new tracks. The follow-up to Straight Outta Compton, Niggaz4Life (commonly known as Efil4zaggin), was released the following year, supported by the singles "Appetite for Destruction" and "Alwayz into Somethin'". Dre left the group shortly after the album's release, and began a feud with fellow member Eazy-E, who later died in 1995.

Dr. Dre, MC Ren and Ice Cube later took part in a brief reunion, releasing the single "Chin Check" featuring Snoop Dogg in 1999, a song featured on the Next Friday soundtrack. The song "Hello" was also released on Ice Cube's 2000 album War & Peace Vol. 2 (The Peace Disc).

== Songs ==
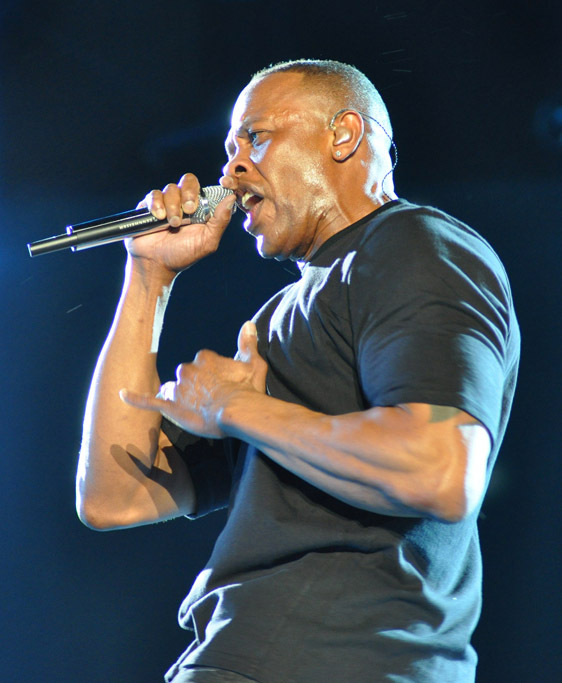
Dr. Dre was a constant member of N.W.A and produced both of the group's albums alongside DJ Yella.

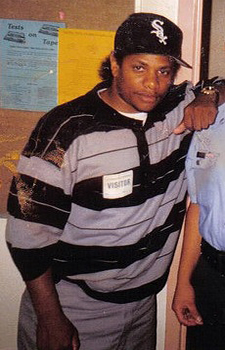
Eazy-E founded Ruthless Records, originally formed the group, and performed on both albums.

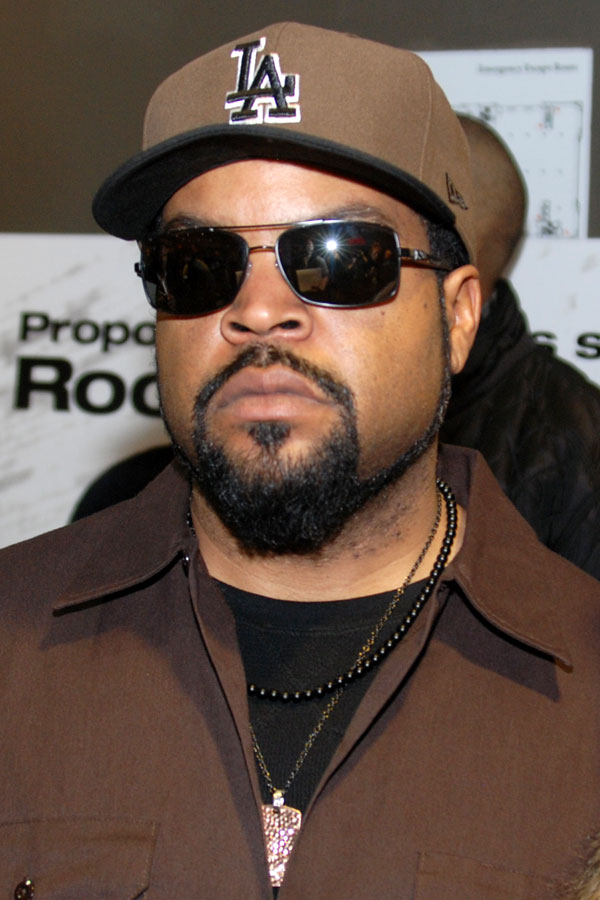
Ice Cube performed on Straight Outta Compton, but left N.W.A after its release due to "financial disagreements".

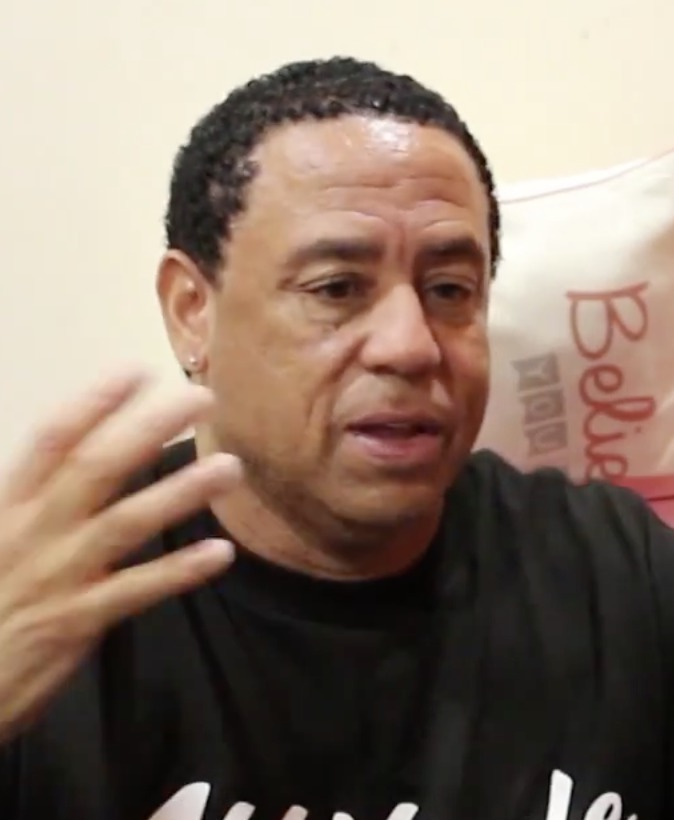
DJ Yella functioned as the group's disc jockey.

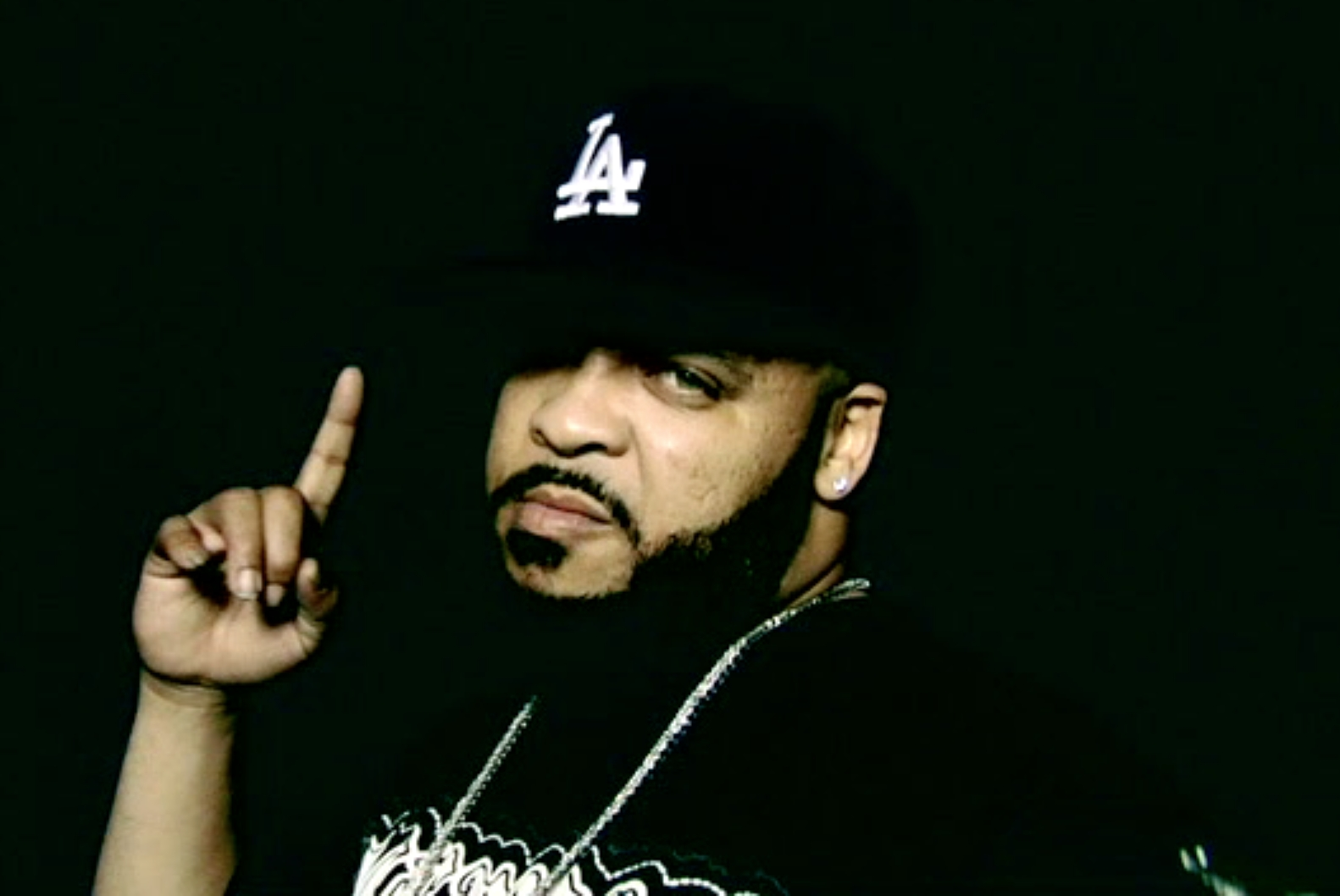
Kokane co-wrote the Niggaz4Life track "Appetite for Destruction", released as a single in 1991.

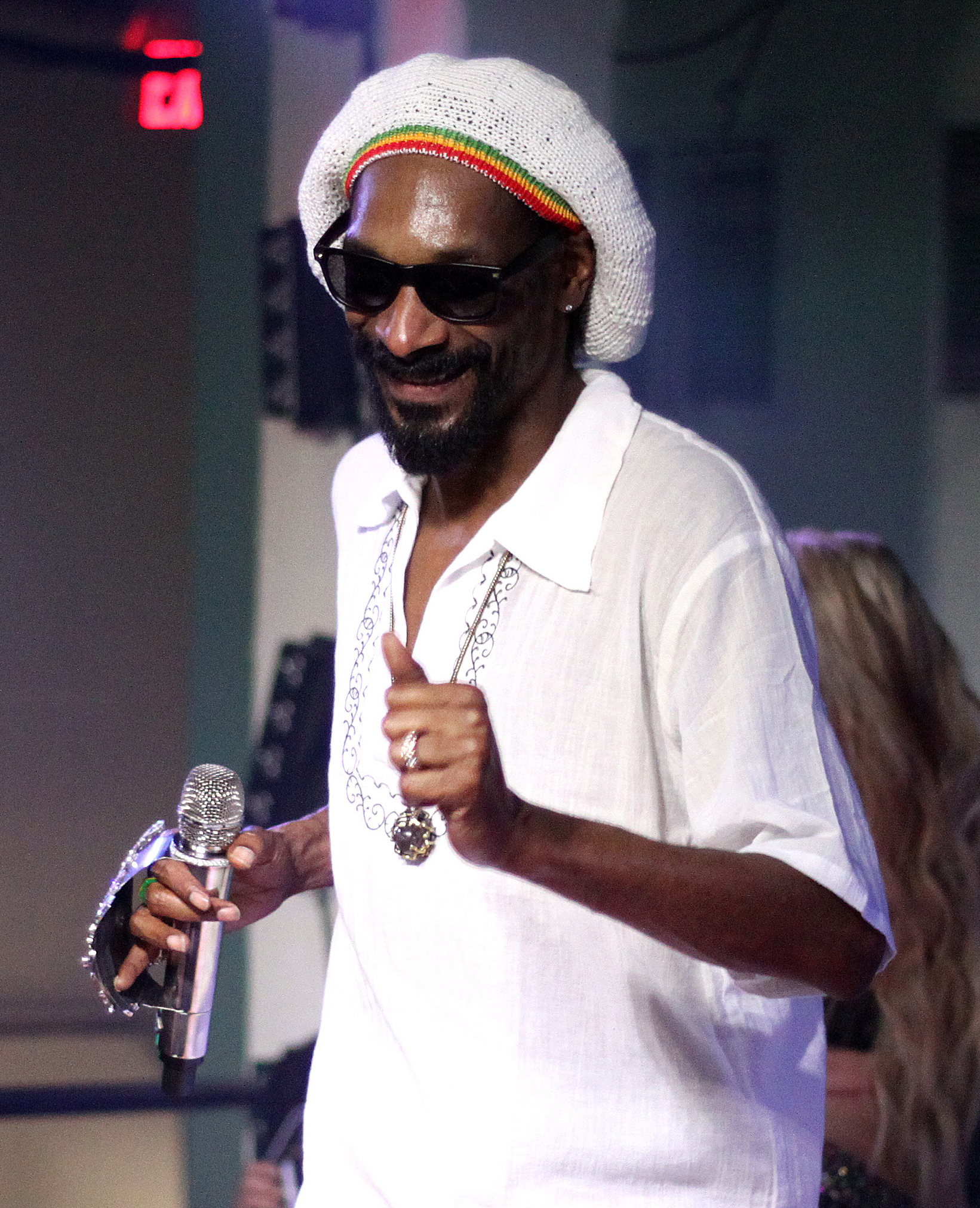
Snoop Dogg was featured on N.W.A's final single, 1999's "Chin Check".

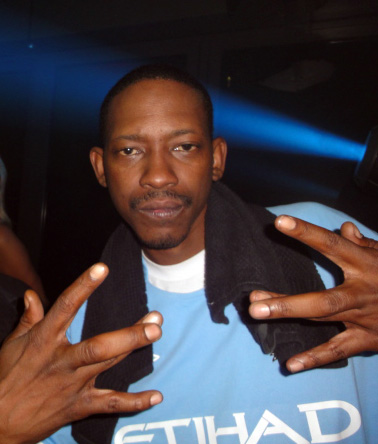
Kurupt was credited as a co-writer of the 1999 single "Chin Check".

Key
†	Indicates song released as a single

Name of song, performer(s), writer(s), original release, and year of release
Title	Performer(s)	Writer(s)	Original release	Year	Ref.
"100 Miles and Runnin'" †	MC Ren; Dr. Dre; Eazy-E	Gregory Hutchinson; Lorenzo Patterson; Eric Wright; Andre Young	100 Miles and Runnin'	1990	
"8 Ball"	Eazy-E	O'Shea Jackson	N.W.A. and the Posse	1987	
"Alwayz into Somethin'" †	Dr. Dre; MC Ren; Admiral D	Andre Young; Lorenzo Patterson; Tracy Curry	Niggaz4Life	1991	
"Appetite for Destruction" †	Dr. Dre; MC Ren; Eazy-E	Andre Young; Lorenzo Patterson; Tracy Curry; Jerry Long	Niggaz4Life	1991	
"Approach to Danger"	MC Ren; Dr. Dre; Eazy-E	Andre Young; Lorenzo Patterson; Tracy Curry; Antoine Carraby	Niggaz4Life	1991	
"Automobile"	Eazy-E; Dr. Dre	Eric Wright	Niggaz4Life	1991	
"A Bitch Iz a Bitch"	Ice Cube	O'Shea Jackson; Andre Young	Non-album single B-side to "Express Yourself"	2002	
"Chin Check" †	Ice Cube; MC Ren; Dr. Dre; Snoop Dogg	Andre Young; Lorenzo Patterson; Calvin Broadus; Ricardo Brown; Melvin Bradford; O'Shea Jackson	Next Friday	1999	
"Compton's n the House"	MC Ren; Dr. Dre	Lorenzo Patterson; Andre Young; O'Shea Jackson	Straight Outta Compton	1989	
"The Dayz of Wayback"	MC Ren; Dr. Dre; Admiral D	Andre Young; Lorenzo Patterson; Tracy Curry	Niggaz4Life	1991	
"Dopeman"	Ice Cube; Eazy-E; Krazy D	O'Shea Jackson	N.W.A. and the Posse	1987	
"Express Yourself" †	Dr. Dre; Ice Cube	O'Shea Jackson	Straight Outta Compton	1989	
"Findum, Fuckum & Flee"	Eazy-E; Dr. Dre; MC Ren; CPO	Andre Young; Lorenzo Patterson; Antoine Carraby; Eric Wright	Niggaz4Life	1991	
"Fuck tha Police"	Ice Cube; MC Ren; Eazy-E	Lorenzo Patterson; O'Shea Jackson	Straight Outta Compton	1989	
"Gangsta Gangsta" †	Ice Cube; Eazy-E	O'Shea Jackson; Eric Wright; Lorenzo Patterson	Straight Outta Compton	1989	
"I Ain't tha 1"	Ice Cube	O'Shea Jackson	Straight Outta Compton	1989	
"I'd Rather Fuck You"	Eazy-E	Andre Young; Antoine Carraby; Eric Wright	Niggaz4Life	1991	
"If It Ain't Ruff"	MC Ren	Lorenzo Patterson	Straight Outta Compton	1989	
"Just Don't Bite It"	MC Ren	Lorenzo Patterson; Andre Young	100 Miles and Runnin'	1990	
"Niggaz 4 Life"	MC Ren; Dr. Dre; Eazy-E	Andre Young; Lorenzo Patterson; Tracy Curry	Niggaz4Life	1991	
"One Less Bitch"	MC Ren; Dr. Dre	Andre Young; Tracy Curry	Niggaz4Life	1991	
"Panic Zone" †	Arabian Prince; Dr. Dre	Damon Trujillo; Andre Young; Mik Lezan	N.W.A. and the Posse	1987	
"Parental Discretion Iz Advised"	The D.O.C. Dr. Dre; MC Ren; Ice Cube; Eazy-E	Eric Wright; Lorenzo Patterson; O'Shea Jackson	Straight Outta Compton	1989	
"Prelude"	MC Ren; Eazy-E; Above the Law	Andre Young; Lorenzo Patterson	Niggaz4Life	1991	
"Quiet on tha Set"	MC Ren	Lorenzo Patterson	Straight Outta Compton	1989	
"Real Niggaz"	MC Ren; Dr. Dre; Eazy-E; DJ Yella	Andre Young; Lorenzo Patterson; Antoine Carraby; Eric Wright	100 Miles and Runnin'	1990	
"Real Niggaz Don't Die"	Dr. Dre; MC Ren; Eazy-E	Andre Young; Lorenzo Patterson; Tracy Curry; Antoine Carraby; Eric Wright	Niggaz4Life	1991	
"Sa Prize (Part 2)"	Dr. Dre; Eazy-E; MC Ren	Tracy Curry; Eric Wright; Lorenzo Patterson	100 Miles and Runnin'	1990	
"She Swallowed It"	MC Ren	Lorenzo Patterson	Niggaz4Life	1991	
"Something 2 Dance 2"	Arabian Prince; DJ Yella; Dr. Dre; Eazy-E	Eric Wright; Andre Young	Straight Outta Compton	1989	
"Something Like That"	MC Ren; Dr. Dre	Lorenzo Patterson; Andre Young	Straight Outta Compton	1989	
"Straight Outta Compton" †	Ice Cube; MC Ren; Eazy-E	Lorenzo Patterson; O'Shea Jackson; Eric Wright	Straight Outta Compton	1989	
