= The Best of N.W.A: The Strength of Street Knowledge =

Greatest hits album by N.W.A
- Released: December 26, 2006
- Recorded: 1986–91, 1998
- Genre: West Coast hip-hop; gangsta rap
- Length: 1:13:49
- Label: Priority
- Producer: Dr. Dre; DJ Yella; Arabian Prince (uncredited)

N.W.A chronology
The N.W.A Legacy, Vol. 2 (2002)	The Best of N.W.A: The Strength of Street Knowledge (2006)	Family Tree (2008)

Professional ratings
Review scores
Source	Rating
AllMusic	4/5 stars
RapReviews	9/10

The Best of N.W.A: The Strength of Street Knowledge is a greatest hits album by American hip-hop group N.W.A. It was released on December 26, 2006, through Priority Records with a bonus DVD material (deluxe 20th anniversary edition). It contains some of their old hits and remixes, interviews and music videos. The title is a reference to the quote from the intro to "Straight Outta Compton".

== Track listing ==
No.	Title	Writer(s)	Producer(s)	Length
1.	"Straight Outta Compton" (2002 digital remaster)	O'Shea Jackson; Lorenzo Patterson; Eric Wright	Dr. Dre; DJ Yella	4:15
2.	"Appetite for Destruction"	Patterson; Andre Young; Tracy Curry; Jerry Buddy Long Jr.	Dr. Dre; DJ Yella	3:08
3.	"Dope Man"	Jackson	Dr. Dre	6:15
4.	"Fuck tha Police" (2006 digital remaster)	Jackson; Patterson	Dr. Dre; DJ Yella	5:14
5.	"Real Niggaz"	Patterson; Wright; Young; Antoine Carraby	Dr. Dre; DJ Yella	4:27
6.	"8-Ball"	Jackson; Young	Dr. Dre	4:15
7.	"Express Yourself"	Jackson; Charles Wright	Dr. Dre; DJ Yella	4:22
8.	"Alwayz into Somethin'" (2000 digital remaster)	Patterson; Young; Curry	Dr. Dre; DJ Yella	4:24
9.	"A Bitch Iz a Bitch"	Jackson; Young	Dr. Dre	3:06
10.	"Gangsta Gangsta" (2002 digital remaster)	Jackson; Patterson; Wright; Young; Leroy Bonner; Marshall Jones; Ralph Middlebrooks; Walter Morrison; Andrew Noland; Greg Webster; Steve Arrington; Marvin Pierce; Norman Napier; Roger Parker; Charles Carter; Wayne Hankerson; William DeVaughn	Dr. Dre; DJ Yella	5:26
11.	"100 Miles and Runnin'"	Patterson; Wright; Young; Gregory Hutchinson; Lamont Dozier; Herbie Hancock; Brian Holland; Edward Holland; Paul Jackson; Melvin Ragin	Dr. Dre; DJ Yella	4:29
12.	"Boyz-n-the-Hood"	Jackson; Wright; Young	Dr. Dre	5:37
13.	"Real Niggaz Don't Die"	Patterson; Wright; Young; Carraby; Curry; Dino Fekaris; Nick Zesses	Dr. Dre; DJ Yella	3:38
14.	"Compton's in the House (Remix)" (2002 digital remaster)	Jackson; Patterson; Young	Dr. Dre; DJ Yella	5:15
15.	"Approach to Danger"	Patterson; Young; Carraby; Curry	Dr. Dre; DJ Yella	2:45
16.	"Chin Check"	Jackson; Patterson; Young; Calvin Broadus; Ricardo Brown; Melvin Bradford	Dr. Dre	3:41
17.	"If It Ain't Ruff" (2002 digital remaster)	Patterson	Dr. Dre; DJ Yella	3:33
Total length:				1:13:49

Notes

- Tracks 1, 4, 7, 10. 14 and 17 are from Straight Outta Compton © 1989
- Tracks 2, 5, 8, 13 and 15 are from Efil4zaggin © 1991
- Tracks 3, 6, 9 and 12 are from N.W.A. and the Posse © 1987
- Track 11 is from 100 Miles and Runnin' © 1990
- Track 16 is from Next Friday (Original Motion Picture Soundtrack) © 1998

Sample credits

- Track 7 contains a sample from "Express Yourself" written by Charles Wright as recorded by Charles Wright & the Watts 103rd Street Rhythm Band
- Track 10 contains a sample from "Funky Worm" written by Leroy Bonner, Marshall Jones, Ralph Middlebrooks, Walter Morrison, Andrew Noland and Greg Webster as recorded by the Ohio Players
- Track 11 contains a sample from "Nowhere to Run" written by Holland–Dozier–Holland as recorded by Martha and the Vandellas and a sample from "Hang Up Your Hang-Ups" written by Herbert Hancock, Paul Jackson and Melvin Ragin as recorded by Herbie Hancock
- Track 13 contains a sample from "I Just Want to Celebrate" written by Dino Fekaris and Nick Zesses as recorded by Rare Earth

DVD
No.	Title	Type	Length
1.	"Straight Outta Compton" (Street version)	Music video
2.	"Hypocrisy of censorship"	Ice Cube interview
3.	"Express Yourself" (Long/execution version)	Music video
4.	"Compton and "Gangsta rap""	Dr. Dre, DJ Yella & MC Ren interview
5.	"100 Miles and Runnin'" (New street version)	Music video
6.	"Parental advisory stickering"	DJ Yella interview
7.	"Appetite for Destruction" (Extended street version)	Music video
8.	"Sex, change of lifestyle"	Dr. Dre, Eazy-E, DJ Yella & MC Ren interview
9.	"Alwayz into Somethin'" (Street version)	Music video
10.	"Approach to Danger, sampling, arguing in the studio"	Dr. Dre, Eazy-E, DJ Yella & MC Ren interview
11.	"Role models, news as an influence, telling the truth and positivity"	Ice Cube interview

== Charts ==
Chart (2007–15)	Peak position
Australian Albums (ARIA)	33
Canadian Albums (Billboard)	74
French Albums (SNEP)	125
US Billboard 200	72
US Top R&B/Hip-Hop Albums (Billboard)	47
US Top Rap Albums (Billboard)	25
US Top Catalog Albums (Billboard)	6

== Certifications ==
Region	Certification	Certified units/sales
United Kingdom (BPI)	Gold	100,000^{‡}
^{‡} Sales+streaming figures based on certification alone.
