= The N.W.A Legacy, Vol. 1: 1988–1998 =

The N.W.A Legacy, Volume 1: 1988-1998

Compilation album by N.W.A and various artists
- Released: March 23, 1999
- Recorded: 1988–1998
- Genre: West Coast hip-hop; gangsta rap
- Length: 2:13:09
- Label: Priority
- Producer: Bryan Turner (exec.)

N.W.A and various artists chronology
Straight Outta Compton: N.W.A 10th Anniversary Tribute (1998)	The N.W.A Legacy, Volume 1: 1988-1998 (1999)	The N.W.A Legacy, Vol. 2 (2002)

Professional ratings
Review scores
Source	Rating
AllMusic	3.5/5 stars
Q	5/5 stars

The N.W.A Legacy, Volume 1: 1988–1998 is a two-disc compilation album released on March 23, 1999, through Priority Records. It is composed of 26 songs recorded from 1988 to 1998 by the American hip-hop group N.W.A, including solo material of its members Ice Cube, Eazy-E, Dr. Dre and MC Ren, and their affiliates such as The D.O.C., Above The Law, Da Lench Mob, Snoop Dogg, Penthouse Players Clique, Tha Dogg Pound, Westside Connection and 2Pac. Bryan Turner served as executive producer.

The album peaked at number 77 on the Billboard 200 and number 42 on the Top R&B/Hip-Hop Albums chart in the United States. It was certified Platinum by the Recording Industry Association of America on September 30, 2002.

Its sequel, The N.W.A Legacy, Vol. 2, was released in 2002.

== Track listing ==
Disc 1
No.	Title	Writer(s)	Length
1.	"Straight Outta Compton" (performed by N.W.A, originally from Straight Outta Compton © 1988)	O'Shea Jackson; Lorenzo Patterson; Eric Wright; Andre Young	4:26
2.	"Boyz-n-the-Hood (Remix)" (performed by Eazy-E, originally from Eazy-Duz-It © 1988)	Jackson; Wright; Young	6:23
3.	"It Was a Good Day (Remix)" (performed by Ice Cube, originally from Bootlegs & B-Sides © 1992)	Jackson; George Clinton, Jr.; Bernard Worrell; William Collins; Curtis Mayfield	4:31
4.	"Dead Homiez" (performed by Ice Cube, originally from Kill at Will © 1990)	Jackson	3:57
5.	"Steady Mobbin'" (performed by Ice Cube, originally from Death Certificate © 1991)	Jackson; Mark Jordan; Hamish Stuart; Alan Gorrie; Roger Ball	4:13
6.	"Guerillas in tha Mist" (performed by Da Lench Mob, originally from Guerillas in tha Mist © 1992)	Jackson; William Hutchison; Clinton, Jr.; Worrell; W. Collins; Mr. Woody	4:27
7.	"Westside Slaughterhouse" (performed by Westside Connection, originally from Mack 10 © 1995)	Dedrick Rolison; Jackson; William Calhoun; Jesper Dahl; Lasse Bavngaard; Nicholas Kvaran; Rasmus Berg; Henrik Rasmussen; J.C. Coleman	5:00
8.	"Bow Down" (performed by Westside Connection, originally from Bow Down © 1996)	Jackson; Rolison; Calhoun; Stephen Anderson	3:30
9.	"The Gangsta, the Killa and the Dope Dealer" (performed by Westside Connection, originally from Bow Down © 1996)	Jackson; Rolison; Calhoun; Trent Reznor	4:13
10.	"Only in California" (performed by Mack 10 featuring Ice Cube and Snoop Doggy Dogg, originally from Based on a True Story © 1997)	Rolison; Jackson; Calvin Broadus; Delmar Arnaud; Priest Brooks	4:43
11.	"Nothin' But the Cavi Hit" (performed by Mack 10 and Tha Dogg Pound, originally from Rhyme & Reason (Original Motion Picture Soundtrack) © 1996)	Rolison; Arnaud; Ricardo Brown; Brooks	4:05
12.	"Color Blind" (performed by Ice Cube, originally from Death Certificate © 1991)	Jackson; Corey Lloyd Brown; Craig Miller; The Maad Circle; Roger McBride; DaSean Cooper; Joseph Modeliste; Art Neville; Leo Nocentelli; George J. Porter, Jr.	4:31
13.	"Final Frontier" (performed by MC Ren, originally from Kizz My Black Azz © 1992)	Patterson; Bobby Ervin; Peter Brown; Joe Sample; Lawrence Parker; Clinton, Jr.; W. Collins; Worrell	4:10

Disc 2
No.	Title	Writer(s)	Length
1.	"Westsyde Radio Megamix (Featuring "Dope Man", "8 Ball", "Radio", "Gangsta, Gangsta" and "Express Yourself")" (performed by N.W.A, megamixed by Julio G © 1998)	Jackson; Patterson; Wright; Young; Leroy Bonner; Marshall Jones; Ralph Middlebrooks; Walter Morrison; Andrew Noland; Greg Webster; Charles Wright	14:47
2.	"We Want Eazy" (performed by Eazy-E, originally from Eazy-Duz-It © 1988)	Wright; W. Collins; Clinton, Jr.; Maceo Parker	5:02
3.	"Trust No Bitch" (performed by Penthouse Players Clique featuring DJ Quik, Eazy-E & AMG, originally from Paid the Cost © 1992)	Wilbert Milo; David Blake; Wright; Jason Lewis; Morrison; Jones; Marvin Pierce; Bonner; Noland; Middlebrooks; Norman Napier; Webster	5:03
4.	"Fuck tha Police" (performed by N.W.A, originally from Straight Outta Compton © 1988)	Patterson; Jackson; Young	5:48
5.	"Alwayz into Somethin'" (performed by N.W.A, originally from Efil4zaggin © 1991)	Patterson; Young; Tracy Curry; Burke Reeves	4:26
6.	"No One Can Do It Better" (performed by The D.O.C., originally from No One Can Do It Better © 1989)	Curry; Young	4:52
7.	"California Love" (performed by 2Pac featuring Dr. Dre and Roger Troutman, originally from UK version of All Eyez on Me © 1995)	Roger Troutman; Larry Troutman; Mikel Hooks; Ronnie Hudson; Joe Cocker; Chris Stainton; Norman Durham; Woodrow Cunningham, Jr.	4:47
8.	"Keep Their Heads Ringin'" (performed by Dr. Dre, originally from Friday (Original Motion Picture Soundtrack) © 1995)	Young; Samuel Anderson; James Anderson; Angela Brown; Gwendolyn Chisolm; Cheryl Cook; Sylvia Robinson	5:07
9.	"Let Me Ride" (performed by Dr. Dre, originally from The Chronic © 1992)	Eric Collins; Broadus; Clinton, Jr.; Worrell; W. Collins	4:23
10.	"Natural Born Killaz" (performed by Dr. Dre and Ice Cube, originally from Murder Was the Case © 1994)	Young; Jackson	4:53
11.	"Murder Was the Case (Remix)" (performed by Snoop Doggy Dogg, originally from Murder Was the Case © 1994)	Broadus; Arnaud; Young	4:22
12.	"In California" (performed by Daz Dillinger, originally from Retaliation, Revenge and Get Back © 1998)	Arnaud; Val Young	5:10
13.	"Tha Last Song" (performed by Above the Law, originally from Livin' Like Hustlers © 1990)	Gregory Hutchinson; Kevin Gulley; Arthur Goodman; Larry Goodman; Patterson; Wright; Young	6:20
Total length:			2:13:09

== Charts ==
Chart (1999)	Peak position
US Billboard 200	77
US Top R&B/Hip-Hop Albums (Billboard)	42

== Certifications ==
Region	Certification	Certified units/sales
Canada (Music Canada)	Gold	50,000^{^}
United Kingdom (BPI)	Silver	60,000^{*}
United States (RIAA)	Platinum	1,000,000^{^}
^{*} Sales figures based on certification alone.^{^} Shipments figures based on certification alone.
