= N.W.A. Legacy =

N.W.A. Legacy may refer to:

- The N.W.A Legacy, Vol. 1: 1988–1998
- The N.W.A Legacy, Vol. 2
