= Greatest Hits (N.W.A album) =

Greatest hits album by N.W.A
- Released: July 2, 1996
- Recorded: 1987–1991
- Genres: West Coast hip-hop; gangsta rap; hardcore hip-hop
- Length: 1:02:07
- Labels: Ruthless; Priority
- Producers: Eazy-E (exec.); DJ Yella; Dr. Dre; Arabian Prince (uncredited)

N.W.A chronology
Niggaz4Life (1991)	Greatest Hits (1996)	Straight Outta Compton: N.W.A 10th Anniversary Tribute (1998)

Professional ratings
Review scores
Source	Rating
AllMusic	4.5/5 stars
Muzik	3/5 stars

Greatest Hits is a greatest hits album by American hip-hop group N.W.A, released on July 2, 1996, via Priority Records. Composed of nineteen tracks, the compilation contains several popular singles and songs from the group's 1989 debut album Straight Outta Compton, 1990 extended play 100 Miles and Runnin' and their second and final studio album 1991 Niggaz4Life. It includes "Gangsta Gangsta", "Fuck tha Police", and remixes of "Straight Outta Compton", "Alwayz into Somethin'", "Express Yourself", and "100 Miles and Runnin'", as well as inserts and recordings from live concerts. Production was handled by Dr. Dre and DJ Yella with Eazy-E serving as executive producer.

The album made it to number 48 on the Billboard 200 and number 20 on the Top R&B/Hip-Hop Albums in the United States. It also peaked at number 43 in New Zealand and number 56 on the UK Albums Chart. It was certified gold by the Recording Industry Association of America on February 14, 2002.

In 2003, Priority Records re-released the album with two bonus tracks — "Chin Check", which was recorded for Next Friday (Original Motion Picture Soundtrack) with one-time member Snoop Dogg, and "Hello", which was recorded for Ice Cube's sixth solo studio album War & Peace Vol. 2 (The Peace Disc) — performed by the reunited N.W.A.

After the success of the 2015 film Straight Outta Compton, the album came back to music charts, re-entering UK Albums Chart at number 49, and reaching number 9 in Australia.

== Track listing ==
No.	Title	Writer(s)	Performers	Length
1.	"Live Intro" (1989)	Antoine Carraby; O'Shea Jackson; Lorenzo Patterson; Eric Wright; Andre Young	Dr. Dre, Ice Cube, MC Ren	2:21
2.	"Arrested" (Insert)		Eazy-E	0:57
3.	"Gangsta Gangsta"	O. Jackson; Patterson; Wright; Young; Leroy Bonner; Marshall Jones; Ralph Middlebrooks; Walter Morrison; Andrew Noland; Greg Webster	Ice Cube, Eazy-E	5:29
4.	"Fuck tha Police" (Insert)		Eazy-E	0:32
5.	"Fuck tha Police"	O. Jackson; Patterson; Young	Eazy-E, MC Ren, Ice Cube	5:42
6.	"Compton's N the House / Ruthless Gangster" (Live)	Patterson; Young	Dr. Dre, MC Ren	2:08
7.	"Break Out" (Insert)		Dr. Dre, DJ Yella, MC Ren	0:21
8.	"Straight Outta Compton" (Extended Mix)	O. Jackson; Patterson; Wright; Young	Eazy-E, MC Ren, Ice Cube	4:28
9.	"If It Ain't Ruff"	Patterson; Young	MC Ren	3:36
10.	"Real Niggaz"	Carraby; Patterson; Wright; Young	Dr. Dre, DJ Yella, Eazy-E, MC Ren	4:44
11.	"I Ain't tha 1"	O. Jackson; Randy Muller	Ice Cube	5:06
12.	"Alwayz into Somethin'"	Patterson; Young; Tracy Curry; Burke Reeves	Dr. Dre, MC Ren, Admiral Dancehall	4:29
13.	"Don't Drink That Wine" (Edit)		Dr. Dre, The D.O.C.	0:26
14.	"Just Don't Bite It"	Patterson; Young; Joseph Williams	MC Ren	5:33
15.	"Cash Money" (Insert)		Dr. Dre	0:20
16.	"Express Yourself" (Remix)	Charles Wright; O. Jackson	Dr. Dre, MC Ren, Ice Cube	4:21
17.	"100 Miles and Runnin'"	Gregory Hutchison; Patterson; Wright; Young; Lamont Dozier; Herbie Hancock; Brian Holland; Edward Holland; Paul Jackson; Melvin Ragin	Dr. Dre, Eazy-E, MC Ren	4:35
18.	"A Bitch Iz a Bitch"	O. Jackson; Young	Ice Cube	3:15
19.	"Real Niggaz Don't Die"	Patterson; Wright; Young; Curry; Dino Fekaris; Colin Wolfe; Nick Zesses	Dr. Dre, Eazy-E, MC Ren	3:42
Total length:				1:02:07

2003 re-release bonus tracks
No.	Title	Writer(s)	Performers	Length
20.	"Chin Check"	O. Jackson; Young; Calvin Broadus; Patterson	Dr. Dre, MC Ren, Ice Cube, Snoop Dogg	4:23
21.	"Hello"	O. Jackson; Young; Patterson	Ice Cube, Dr. Dre, MC Ren	3:52

Sample credits

- Track 3 contains a sample from "Funky Worm" written by Leroy Bonner, Marshall Jones, Ralph Middlebrooks, Walter Morrison, Andrew Noland and Greg Webster as recorded by Ohio Players
- Track 11 contains a sample from "The Message (Inspiration)" written by Randy Muller as recorded by Brass Construction
- Track 14 contains a sample of "That Girl's a Slut" written by Joseph Williams as recorded by Just-Ice
- Track 16 contains a sample from "Express Yourself" written by Charles Wright as recorded by Charles Wright & the Watts 103rd Street Rhythm Band
- Track 17 contains a sample from "Nowhere to Run" written by Holland–Dozier–Holland as recorded by Martha and the Vandellas and a sample from "Hang Up Your Hang-Ups" written by Herbert Hancock, Paul Jackson and Melvin Ragin as recorded by Herbie Hancock
- Track 19 contains a sample from "I Just Want to Celebrate" written by Dino Fekaris and Nick Zesses as recorded by Rare Earth

== Charts ==
=== Weekly charts ===
Chart (1996)	Peak position
Canada Top Albums/CDs (RPM)	41
New Zealand Albums (RMNZ)	43
US Billboard 200	48
US Top R&B/Hip-Hop Albums (Billboard)	20
Chart (2015)	Position
Australian Albums (ARIA)	9
UK Albums (Official Charts)	49
UK R&B Albums (Official Charts)	8
US Top Catalog Albums (Billboard)	5

=== Year-end charts ===
Chart (2015)	Position
Australian Albums (ARIA)	99

== Certifications ==
Region	Certification	Certified units/sales
Canada (Music Canada)	Gold	50,000^{^}
United Kingdom (BPI)	Gold	100,000^{*}
United States (RIAA)	Gold	500,000^{^}
^{*} Sales figures based on certification alone.^{^} Shipments figures based on certification alone.
