= Hello (Ice Cube song) =

2000 single by Ice Cube featuring Dr. Dre and MC Ren

Single by Ice Cube featuring Dr. Dre and MC Ren

from the album War & Peace Vol. 2 (The Peace Disc)
- Released: June 3, 2000
- Recorded: 1999
- Genre: West Coast hip-hop; gangsta rap; G-funk; hardcore hip-hop
- Length: 3:52
- Label: Priority
- Songwriters: O'Shea Jackson; Lorenzo Patterson; Andre Young
- Producer: Dr. Dre

Ice Cube singles chronology
"Until We Rich" (2000)	"Hello" (2000)	"$100 Bill Y'all" (2001)

Dr. Dre singles chronology
"Forgot About Dre" (2000)	"Hello" (2000)	"The Next Episode" (2000)

MC Ren singles chronology
"Who in the Fuck" (1998)	"Hello" (2000)	"Renincarnated" (2009)

N.W.A singles chronology
"Chin Check" (1999)	"Hello" (2000)

Music video
- "Hello" on YouTube

"Hello" is a song written and performed by American rappers and former N.W.A members Ice Cube, Dr. Dre and MC Ren. It was released in 2000 via Priority Records as the third and final single from Ice Cube's sixth solo studio album War & Peace Vol. 2 (The Peace Disc). Produced by Dr. Dre, with Mel-Man serving as co-producer, it features backing vocals from Traci Nelson.

In the United States, the single made it to number 50 on the Hot R&B/Hip-Hop Songs, number 46 on the R&B/Hip-Hop Airplay, number 51 on the R&B/Hip-Hop Streaming Songs, number 40 on both the Mainstream R&B/Hip-Hop Airplay and the Rhythmic Airplay, and number 18 on the Rap Airplay charts.

The song was later included in Ice Cube's 2001 Greatest Hits, and in N.W.A's 2002 The N.W.A Legacy, Vol. 2 and 2003 reissue of 1996 Greatest Hits compilations.

== Background ==
The song marks a reunion of three out of six former core N.W.A groupmates Ice Cube, Dr. Dre and MC Ren, missing DJ Yella, Arabian Prince, and the late Eazy-E. The trio previously reunited under the N.W.A brand for the song "Chin Check" from Next Friday (Original Motion Picture Soundtrack).

The production for "Hello" was originally made for rapper King T to be used on his debut album for Dre's Aftermath Entertainment, The Kingdom Come. According to Dr. Dre collaborator Chris Taylor, he and Dr. Dre worked on the track together during a recording session for The Kingdom Come in Reno, Nevada: "he did the drum beat and I put everything else on top of it". Taylor also claimed the instrumental for the Dr. Dre song "Xxplosive" was created in the same session.

== Music video ==
The music video gets similar scenes to the N.W.A's music video of "Alwayz into Somethin'".

== Track listing ==
No.	Title	Writer(s)	Producer(s)	Length
1.	"Hello" (Radio Edit)	O'Shea Jackson; Andre Young; Lorenzo Patterson	Dr. Dre; Mel-Man (co.)	3:52
2.	"Hello" (Main Mix)	Jackson; Young; Patterson	Dr. Dre; Mel-Man (co.)	3:55
3.	"Hello" (Instrumental)	Jackson; Young; Patterson	Dr. Dre; Mel-Man (co.)	3:51
4.	"Waitin' Ta Hate"	Jackson; George Clinton; Billy Nichols; Erick Sermon; Parrish Smith; Allen Williams	One Eye; DJ Joe Rodriguez	3:39
Total length:				15:17

== Personnel ==
- O'Shea "Ice Cube" Jackson – rap vocals, executive producer
- Andre "Dr. Dre" Young – rap vocals, producer, mixing
- Lorenzo "MC Ren" Patterson – rap vocals
- Traci Nelson – backing vocals
- Chris "The Glove" Taylor – keyboards
- Tommy Coster Jr. – keyboards
- Mike Elizondo – bass
- Melvin "Mel-Man" Bradford – co-producer
- Richard "Segal" Huredia – engineering
- James McCrone – engineering assistant
- Tom Gordon – engineering assistant

== Charts ==
Chart (2000)	Peak position
US Hot R&B/Hip-Hop Songs (Billboard)	50
US R&B/Hip-Hop Airplay (Billboard)	46

== Certifications ==
Region	Certification	Certified units/sales
New Zealand (RMNZ)	Gold	15,000^{‡}
^{‡} Sales+streaming figures based on certification alone.
