= The N.W.A Legacy, Vol. 2 =

Compilation album by N.W.A
- Released: August 27, 2002
- Genre: West Coast hip-hop, gangsta rap, G-funk
- Label: Ruthless, Priority Records

N.W.A chronology
The N.W.A Legacy, Vol. 1: 1988–1998 (1999)	The N.W.A Legacy, Vol. 2 (2002)	The Best of N.W.A: The Strength of Street Knowledge (2006)

The N.W.A Legacy, Vol. 2 is a compilation of tracks from original members of the American hip-hop group N.W.A; rappers Ice Cube, Eazy-E, Dr. Dre, MC Ren, and DJ Yella, as well as artists that were spawned by members of the group, such as Tha Dogg Pound, Bone Thugs-n-Harmony, and Tha Eastsidaz. Some other tracks are collaborations or songs by associates of the foursome, such as The D.O.C. and D.J. Quik. It is the second album in the series. Songs were originally from various labels, including Ruthless Records, Def Jam, Tommy Boy and Death Row Records. Mark Copeland executive produced the album.

== Track listing ==
The N.W.A Legacy, Vol. 2
No.	Title	Length
1.	"Hello" (Ice Cube feat. Dr. Dre and MC Ren (originally from War & Peace Vol. 2 (The Peace Disc))	3:51
2.	"Chin Check" (N.W.A (without Eazy-E and DJ Yella) feat. Snoop Dogg (originally from Next Friday)	4:23
3.	"Got Ta Hustle" (Ant Banks feat. MC Ren (originally from Nuthin' but a Gangsta Party 2)	5:05
4.	"Gangstas Make The World Go Round" (Westside Connection (originally from Bow Down)	4:32
5.	"Lay Low" (Snoop Dogg feat. Nate Dogg, Master P, Butch Cassidy and Tha Eastsidaz (originally from Tha Last Meal)	3:42
6.	"Got Beef" (Tha Eastsidaz (originally from Snoop Dogg Presents Tha Eastsidaz)	4:10
7.	"Wrong Idea" (Snoop Dogg feat. Bad Azz, Kokane and Lil' ½ Dead (originally from Personal Business and Tha Last Meal)	4:10
8.	"Just Dippin'" (Snoop Dogg feat. Dr. Dre and Jewell (originally from No Limit Top Dogg)	3:59
9.	"Bitch Please" (Snoop Dogg feat. Xzibit (originally from No Limit Top Dogg)	3:47
10.	"Ghetto Fabulous" (Ras Kass feat. Dr. Dre and Mack 10 (originally from Rasassination)	4:21
11.	"Behind the Walls" (Kurupt feat. Nate Dogg (exclusive)	4:26
12.	"AmeriKKKa's Most Wanted" (Ice Cube (originally from AmeriKKKa's Most Wanted)	4:09
13.	"Appetite for Destruction" (N.W.A (originally from Niggaz4Life)	3:07
14.	"Born and Raised in Compton" (DJ Quik (originally from Quik Is the Name)	3:23
15.	"Eazy-Duz-It" (Eazy-E (originally from Eazy-Duz-It)	4:17
16.	"Ole School Shit" (Eazy-E feat. Dresta and B.G. Knocc Out and Sylk-E. Fyne (originally from Str8 off tha Streetz of Muthaphukkin Compton)	4:00
17.	"Foe tha Love of $" (Bone Thugs-N-Harmony feat. Eazy-E (originally from Creepin on ah Come Up)	4:10
18.	"Get Yo Ride On" (Mack 10 feat. Eazy-E and MC Eiht (originally from The Recipe)	3:29
19.	"The Grand Finale" (The D.O.C. feat. N.W.A (originally from No One Can Do It Better)	4:38

== Critical reception ==
Professional ratings
Review scores
Source	Rating
AllMusic	3/5 stars

Kathleen C. Fennessy of AllMusic believed The N.W.A. Legacy, Vol. 2 was an introductory sample of future re-releases by Priority Records.
