= Appetite for Destruction (song) =

Single by N.W.A

from the album Niggaz4Life
- Released: May 18, 1991
- Genre: Mafioso rap; West Coast hip hop
- Length: 3:22
- Label: Ruthless; Priority
- Songwriters: MC Ren; The D.O.C.; Kokane
- Producers: Dr. Dre; DJ Yella

N.W.A singles chronology
"Alwayz into Somethin'" (1991)	"Appetite for Destruction" (1991)	"The Dayz of Wayback" (1991)

"Appetite for Destruction" is a song by American hip hop group N.W.A. The song is the second single from their final studio album Niggaz4Life. The song also appeared on The Best of N.W.A: The Strength of Street Knowledge. The music video featured members of N.W.A robbing a bank in a 1920s setting. After they rob the bank, the video returns to color and a modern setting. In the last scene, when the other members of N.W.A attempt to get away in a car, Eazy-E blows the car up killing the other members thus ending the song with the line, "Number 10 is my appetite to kill".

An extended version of the song for the music video also appeared on the home video Niggaz4Life: The Only Home Video released in 1992.

The song was named after the debut album of hard rock band Guns N' Roses, whom N.W.A had befriended and nearly toured with.
