= The Dayz of Wayback =

Single by N.W.A featuring Admiral Dancehall

from the album Niggaz4Life
- Released: 1991
- Genre: Gangsta rap; West Coast hip hop; hardcore hip hop; political hip hop
- Length: 4:24
- Label: Ruthless; Priority
- Songwriters: Andre Young; Lorenzo Patterson; Tracy Curry
- Producers: Dr. Dre; DJ Yella

N.W.A singles chronology
| "Appetite for Destruction" (1991) | "The Dayz of Wayback" (1991) | "Chin Check" (1999) |

"The Dayz of Wayback" is the third single on American hip hop group N.W.A.'s second studio album "Niggaz4Life", performed by Dr. Dre and MC Ren featuring Admiral Dancehall. It was only released as a single in the UK.
