= 100 Miles and Runnin' =

EP by N.W.A
- Released: August 14, 1990
- Recorded: 1990
- Studio: Audio Achievements (Torrance, California)
- Genres: West Coast hip-hop; gangsta rap; hardcore hip-hop; dirty rap
- Length: 23:17
- Labels: Priority; Ruthless
- Producers: Eazy-E (exec.); Dr. Dre; Yella

N.W.A chronology
Straight Outta Compton (1989)	100 Miles and Runnin' (1990)	Niggaz4Life (1991)

Singles from 100 Miles and Runnin'
- 1. "100 Miles and Runnin'" Released: 1990

Professional ratings
Review scores
Source	Rating
AllMusic	3/5 stars
Robert Christgau	C−
Entertainment Weekly	D+
RapReviews	6.5/10
The Rolling Stone Album Guide	1/5 stars
The Source	4/5 stars
Spin Alternative Record Guide	4/10

100 Miles and Runnin' is the only extended play by American hip-hop group N.W.A. Released on August 14, 1990, through Priority Records and Eazy-E's Ruthless Records, this EP of five tracks reflects an evolution of N.W.A's sound and centers on the single "100 Miles and Runnin'". Two tracks, "100 Miles" and "Real Niggaz", incidentally incited N.W.A's feud with Ice Cube, who had left to start a solo rap career. The porno rap track "Just Don't Bite It" also drew notice. Pushing lyrical boundaries in its day, the EP went gold in November 1990 and platinum in September 1992.

== Backstory ==
The EP's third track "Sa Prize, Pt. 2" is a sequel to "Fuck tha Police"—the most controversial track on N.W.A's official debut album, Straight Outta Compton (Note: The 1987 album N.W.A. and the Posse, a compilation album often recognized as N.W.A's first or even debut but neglected album, was released by Macola Records, a distributor of N.W.A's early singles and EP releases, but not planned by N.W.A as an album release. On the other hand, N.W.A's 1989 album Straight Outta Compton, via N.W.A's next distributor, Priority Records, was so planned by N.W.A, and thereby often is also, but contrarily, considered N.W.A's first album.)". 100 Miles and Runnin'". became N.W.A's first single to see national radio play, and its music video see national television airtime. It is the first N.W.A. project without Ice Cube and Arabian Prince. The EP attained gold sales, over 500,000 copies sold, by November 16, 1990, and on September 16, 1992, was certified platinum, over 1 million sold.

=== Ice Cube's departure and subsequent feud ===
In 1989, Ice Cube, a rapper and songwriter in N.W.A, who had been paid about $32,000 so far, asked group leader Eazy-E for a meeting on money allocation. N.W.A's manager Jerry Heller, Eazy's business partner, led the meeting.

At Cube's concerns, Heller offered N.W.A's five members—Eazy, Dr. Dre, Cube, DJ Yella, and MC Ren—a contract nearly unchanged, but a $75,000 signing bonus. Only Cube refused to sign it. In January 1990, he left N.W.A. In May 1990, Cube's debut solo album arrived as AmeriKKKa's Most Wanted, which Spin magazine called a "masterpiece" and The Source magazine gave a full five "microphones". N.W.A's EP, written by Ren and The D.O.C., has two tracks smearing Cube.

In the EP's title track, alluding to Ice Cube, Dre raps, "It started with five, but yo, one couldn't take it / So now there's four, 'cause the fifth couldn't make it." And in "Real Niggaz", soon after Ren raps, "Only reason niggas pick up your record is 'cause they thought it was us", Dre calls Cube both "too much cargo" and the proverbial traitor Benedict Arnold.

Hosting rap TV show Pump It Up!, Dee Barnes interviewed N.W.A, promoting the EP. Later, the show's producers sent Barnes to get Cube's rebuttal. Against Barnes's warning, the November 1990 episode splices interview clips to magnify the conflict. In January, drunk at a Ruthless party in Hollywood, Dre assaulted Barnes, reputedly in payback.

Released in May 1991, N.W.A's next album, EFil4zaggin or Niggaz4Life, furthered the feud in two more tracks: "Message to B.A." and, in a few lines, the hit single "Alwayz into Somethin'". Cube's second album, Death Certificate, released in October, retorts in "No Vaseline", depicting N.W.A as sellouts screwed by Jerry Heller. Cube thus won the battle as N.W.A. never responded to the diss, ending there.

=== EP highlights ===
The 100 Miles EP previewed N.W.A's evolving sound, spare on Straight Outta Compton, and now more layered, as in the "100 Miles" track. This song's idea was from a film among Eazy's favorites, director Walter Hill's 1979 gangster film The Warriors. On the other hand, the track "Just Don't Bite It", says AllMusic, "is an alarming porno rap that at the time of its release was as explicit as anything out there, including 2 Live Crew."

From the 100 Miles EP, three songs— "100 Miles and Runnin'", "Just Don't Bite It", and "Real Niggaz"—would be collected on N.W.A's Greatest Hits. "Real Niggaz" appears, too, on N.W.A's second and final official, studio album, Efil4zaggin, the backwards spelling of Niggaz4Life. On it, "She Swallowed It" as well as "Findum, Fuckum & Flee"—ahead of dozens of other rap songs in later years—sample "Just Don't Bite It", as does the punk ska band Sublime's song "Let's Go Get Stoned". Arriving in 2003, a remastered edition of Efil4zaggin fully appends the 100 Miles EP.

== Track listing ==
All songs produced by Dr. Dre and DJ Yella:

No.	Title	Writer(s)	Performer(s)	Length
1.	"100 Miles and Runnin'"	L. Patterson; T. Curry; G Hutchison	MC Ren; Dr. Dre; Eazy-E	4:32
2.	"Just Don't Bite It"	L. Patterson	MC Ren	5:28
3.	"Sa Prize (Part 2)"	L. Patterson; Tracy Curry	MC Ren; Dr. Dre; Eazy-E; The D.O.C.	5:59
4.	"Real Niggaz"	L. Patterson; T. Curry	MC Ren; Dr. Dre; Eazy-E	5:27
5.	"Kamurshol"	Tracy Curry		1:56

== Personnel ==
- Andre "Dr. Dre" Young – producer, vocals
- Lorenzo "MC Ren" Patterson – vocals, lyrics
- Eric "Eazy-E" Wright – executive producer, vocals (tracks 1, 3–5)
- Antoine "DJ Yella" Carraby – producer, DJ
- Tracy Lynn "The D.O.C." Curry – lyrics (tracks 1, 4), vocals (track 3)
- Gregory Fernan "Cold 187um" Hutchison – lyrics (tracks 1)
- Michael Sims – bass, guitar
- Brian Kilgore – tambourine (track 2)
- Donovan Smith – engineer
- Steve Huston – artwork
- Kevin Hosmann – art direction
- David Provost – photography
- Jerry Heller – management

== Charts ==
=== Weekly charts ===
Chart (1990)	Peak position
US Billboard 200	27
US Top R&B/Hip-Hop Albums (Billboard)	10

=== Year-end charts ===
Chart (1990)	Position
US Top R&B/Hip-Hop Albums (Billboard)	77

== Certifications ==
Region	Certification	Certified units/sales
United States (RIAA)	Platinum	1,000,000^{^}
^{^} Shipments figures based on certification alone.

== See also ==
- Bridgeport Music, Inc. v. Dimension Films
