= N.W.A =

American hip-hop group

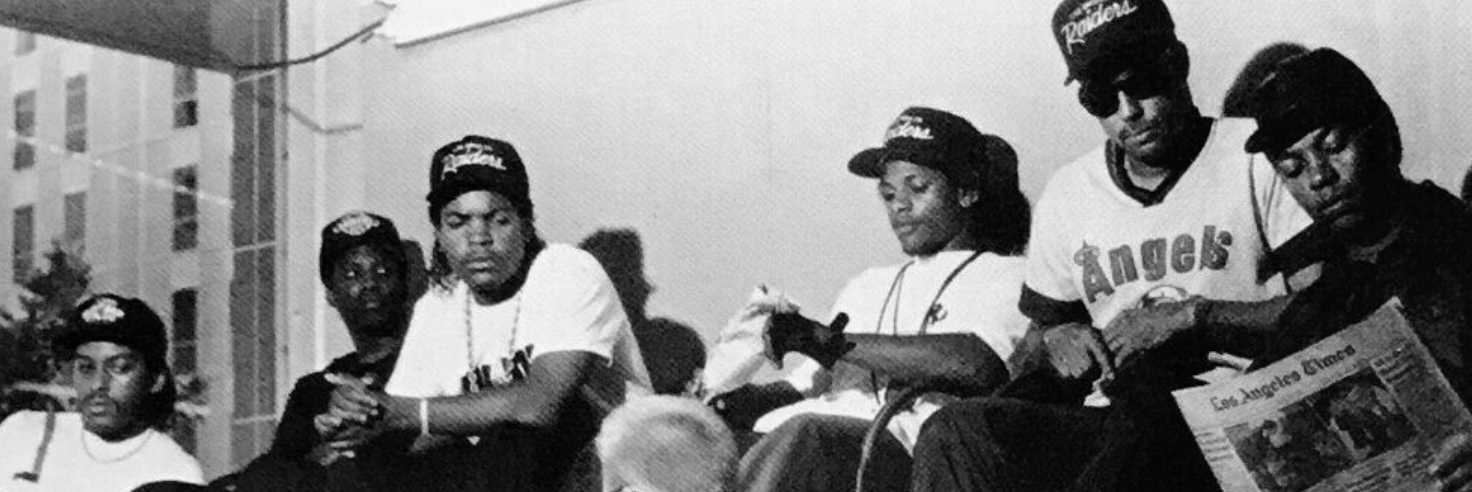
- Complete lineup in 1988; From left: Arabian Prince, MC Ren, Ice Cube, Eazy-E, DJ Yella, Dr. Dre

Background information
- Origin: Compton, California, U.S.
- Genres: West Coast hip-hop; gangsta rap
- Works: Discography
- Years active: 1987–1991; 1999–2001; 2015; 2016
- Labels: Priority; Ruthless
- Past members: Arabian Prince; Dr. Dre; Eazy-E; Ice Cube; DJ Yella; MC Ren
- Logo

N.W.A (an abbreviation for Niggaz Wit Attitudes) was an American hip-hop group formed in Compton, California, in 1987. Among the earliest and most significant figures of the gangsta rap subgenre, the group is widely considered one of the greatest and most influential acts in hip-hop.

Active from 1987 to 1991, N.W.A endured controversy owing to their music's explicit lyrics, which some viewed as misogynistic or homophobic, as well as to its glorification of drugs and crime. The group was subsequently banned from many mainstream American radio stations. In spite of this, they have sold over ten million units in the United States alone. Drawing on its members' own stories of racism and excessive policing, N.W.A made inherently political music. N.W.A's consistent accusations of institutional racism within the American police significantly contributed to the political awareness and involvement of American youth against racism.

The original lineup, formed in early 1987, consisted of Arabian Prince, Dr. Dre, Eazy-E, and Ice Cube, with DJ Yella joining shortly thereafter and MC Ren recruited as the sixth member of the group in mid-1988. Their first release was the compilation/split album, N.W.A. and the Posse (1987), which peaked at No. 39 on Billboard magazine's Top R&B/Hip-Hop Albums chart, and it was followed by their debut studio album Straight Outta Compton (1989). Arabian Prince left N.W.A in January 1989, just before the release of Straight Outta Compton, with Ice Cube following suit in December of that year. The group continued on as a four-piece, with no replacements for Arabian Prince and Ice Cube, and disbanded shortly after the release of their second album Niggaz4Life (1991).

Eazy-E, Ice Cube, MC Ren, and Dr. Dre later became platinum-selling solo artists in their own right in the 1990s. Eazy-E died from AIDS on March 26, 1995. The surviving members of N.W.A have continued to occasionally work together since Eazy-E's death, including a reunion of the Straight Outta Compton lineup (sans Eazy-E and Arabian Prince) from 1999 to 2001, during which a third album was in the works but abandoned due to issues with the rights to the N.W.A name.

The group's debut album marked the beginning of the new gangsta rap era, as the production and social commentary in their lyrics were revolutionary within the genre. Niggaz4Life was the first hardcore rap album to reach number one on the Billboard 200 sales charts. In general, N.W.A had a lasting effect on generations of hip-hop artists and, in the late 1980s, played a crucial role in shaping rap as it evolved musically and lyrically. Moreover, the group was credited with being the first to open up rap to a white American audience, contributing to the rapid spread of rap within the American population in general, starting from the late 1980s.

Rolling Stone ranked N.W.A at number 83 on its list of the "100 Greatest Artists of All Time". In 2016, the group was inducted into the Rock and Roll Hall of Fame, following three previous nominations. In 2024, they received the Grammy Lifetime Achievement Award.

== History ==
=== Formation and "Panic Zone" (1987–1988) ===
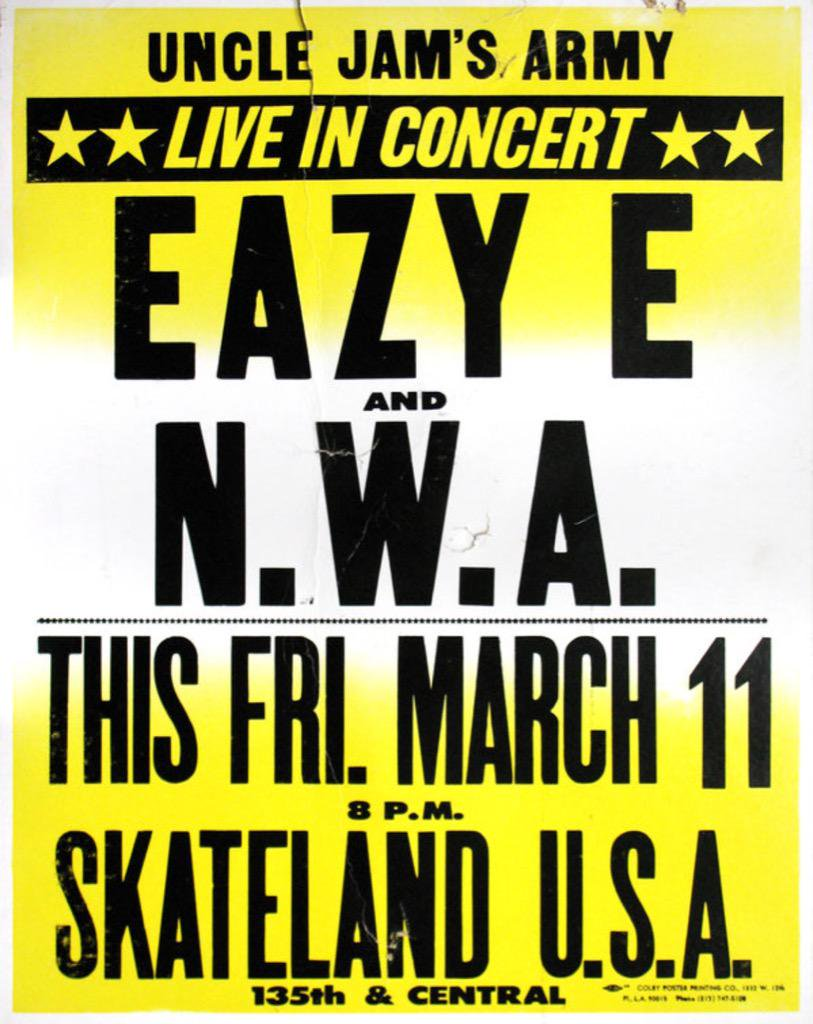
Poster for one of N.W.A's first concerts at a Compton skating rink, 1988

N.W.A was assembled by Compton-based Eazy-E, who co-founded Ruthless Records with Jerry Heller. Eazy-E sought an introduction to Steve Yano. Although Yano initially rebuffed him, he was impressed by Eazy-E's persistence, and arranged a meeting with Dr. Dre. Initially, N.W.A consisted of Eazy-E, Dr. Dre, fellow producer Arabian Prince and Ice Cube who started out as a rapper for the group C.I.A.

Ruthless released the single "Panic Zone" in 1987 with Macola Records, which was later included on the compilation album N.W.A. and the Posse. N.W.A was still in its developing stages, and is only credited on three of the eleven tracks, notably the uncharacteristic record "Panic Zone", "8-Ball", and "Dopeman", which marked the first collaboration of Eazy E, Arabian Prince, Dr. Dre, and Ice Cube. Mexican rapper Krazy-Dee co-wrote "Panic Zone", which was originally called "Hispanic Zone", but the title was later changed when Dr. Dre advised Krazy-Dee that the word "hispanic" would hinder sales. Also included was Eazy-E's solo track "Boyz-n-the-Hood". Dre later brought DJ Yella on board as well. Dre and Yella were both formerly members of the World Class Wreckin' Cru as DJs and producers. Finally, solo rapper MC Ren joined the group.

=== Eazy-Duz-It and Straight Outta Compton (1988–1989) ===
N.W.A recorded their official debut, Straight Outta Compton, during the summer and fall of 1988. The album was released in January 1989, and it peaked at No. 37 on the Billboard 200 chart and was eventually certified 3× platinum by the RIAA. With its famous opening salvo of three tracks, the group reflected the rising anger of the urban youth. The opening song "Straight Outta Compton" introduced the group, "Fuck tha Police" protested police brutality and racial profiling, and "Gangsta Gangsta" painted the worldview of the inner-city youth. While the group was later credited with pioneering the burgeoning subgenre of gangsta rap, N.W.A referred to their music as "reality rap".

Twenty-six years after the album's release, member and co-producer of the Straight Outta Compton film, Ice Cube, commented "they were talking about what really led into the style that we ended up doing, which is now called hardcore gangster rap." Dr. Dre, DJ Yella, and Arabian Prince as HighPowered Productions, composed the beats for each song, with Dre making occasional rapping appearances. The D.O.C., Ice Cube, and MC Ren wrote most of the group's lyrics, including "Fuck tha Police", perhaps the group's most notorious song, which brought them into conflict with various law enforcement agencies. Under pressure from Focus on the Family, Milt Ahlerich, an assistant director of the FBI sent a letter to Ruthless and its distributing company Priority Records, advising the rappers that "advocating violence and assault is wrong and we in the law enforcement community take exception to such action." This letter can still be seen at the Rock and Roll Hall of Fame in Cleveland, Ohio. Policemen refused to provide security for the group's concerts, hurting their plans to tour. Nonetheless, the FBI's letter only served to draw more publicity to the group.

Straight Outta Compton was also one of the first albums to adhere to the new Parental Advisory label scheme, then still in its early stages: the label at the time consisted of "WARNING: Moderate impact coarse language and/or themes" only. However, the taboo nature of N.W.A's music was the most important factor of its mass appeal. Media coverage compensated for the group's lack of airplay, and its album eventually went double platinum. Two months before Straight Outta Compton, Eazy-E's solo debut Eazy-Duz-It was released. The album was dominated by Eazy's persona (MC Ren was the only guest rapper) but behind the scenes it was a group effort. Music was handled by Dr. Dre and DJ Yella; the lyrics were largely written by MC Ren, with contributions from Ice Cube and The D.O.C., and the album was another double platinum success for Ruthless (a few months earlier, Ruthless had found their initial success with J.J. Fad's gold-certified debut album Supersonic, which featured contributions from Dr. Dre, Arabian Prince, Eazy-E, and MC Ren).

By the time Straight Outta Compton was finished, Arabian Prince increasingly became disillusioned with how Heller managed the group's funds. He gradually skipped studio sessions and photoshoots. N.W.A accompanied Public Enemy and Ice-T on a short nationwide tour from December 1988 to January 1989. When this tour concluded, Arabian Prince left the group. N.W.A embarked on an extensive three-month nationwide tour in the summer and fall of 1989. The shows also typically featured solo sets by Eazy-E. Ruthless also handled numerous successful releases in 1989, such as Michel'le's debut album Michel'le (which featured contributions from Dr. Dre and Eazy-E), the official reissue of N.W.A and the Posse on CD, and The D.O.C.'s debut album No One Can Do It Better. No One Can Do It Better was essentially a collaboration with Dr. Dre and notably free of "gangsta rap" content, including the N.W.A posse cut "The Grand Finalé". It became another platinum-certified album for Ruthless.

=== 100 Miles and Runnin' and Niggaz4Life (1989–1991) ===
Ice Cube left the group in late 1989 over royalty disputes; having written almost half of the lyrics on Straight Outta Compton himself, he felt he was not getting a fair share of the profits. A lawsuit brought by Ice Cube against band manager Jerry Heller was settled out of court. He wasted little time putting together his solo debut, 1990's AmeriKKKa's Most Wanted, but he avoided mentioning his former label mates. The title track from N.W.A's EP 100 Miles and Runnin' (released just three months after AmeriKKKa's Most Wanted), however, included a diss towards Cube: "We started with five, but yo / One couldn't take it—So now it's four / Cuz the fifth couldn't make it." The video for the song depicted the remaining members of N.W.A together in a jail cell, while an Ice Cube look-alike is released.

Also heard on the EP (which found its way on the Efil4zaggin album) was "Real Niggaz", a full-blown diss to Ice Cube where the remaining members accuse him of cowardice, and question his authenticity, longevity and originality: "How the fuck you think a rapper lasts / With your ass sayin' shit that was said in the past / Yo, be original, your shit is sloppy / Get off the dick, you motherfuckin' carbon-copy", and "We started out with too much cargo / So I'm glad we got rid of Benedict Arnold, yo."

The song "100 Miles and Runnin'" was Dr. Dre's final uptempo recording, which had been a common feature of late 1980s hip-hop. After this, he focused on a midtempo, synthesizer based sound which became known as G-funk, starting with "Alwayz Into Somethin'" from Efil4zaggin in 1991. The G-funk style dominated both the West and East Coast hip-hop music scene for several years to come.

N.W.A is referenced on Ice Cube's 1990 EP, Kill at Will, where he name-checks his former group (likely in a mocking manner) on the song "Jackin' For Beats". On "I Gotta Say What Up!!!", Ice Cube gives shout-outs to his rap peers at the time, among them Public Enemy, Geto Boys, and Sir Jinx. At the end of the track, in what appears to be an on-the-phone interview, Ice Cube is asked, "Since you went solo, what's up with the rest of the crew?" and the phone is abruptly hung up on the interviewer.

The group's second full-length release, 1991's Efil4zaggin ("Niggaz4Life" spelled backwards), re-established the band in the face of Ice Cube's continued solo success. The album is considered by many Dr. Dre's finest production work, and it heralded the beginning of the G-Funk era. It also showed a clear animosity towards their former member, and derogatory references to Ice Cube are found in several songs. The interlude "A Message to B.A." echoes the beginning of his song "Turn Off the Radio" from AmeriKKKa's Most Wanted: Ice Cube is first addressed by the name Benedict Arnold (after the infamous traitor of the American Revolution) but then named outright in a torrent of abuse from both the group and its fans: "When we see yo' ass, we gon' cut yo' hair off and fuck you with a broomstick" spoken by MC Ren.

The N.W.A–Ice Cube feud eventually escalated, both on record and in real life. AmeriKKKa's Most Wanted had avoided direct attacks on N.W.A, but on Death Certificate, Ice Cube's second full-length release, he retaliated. He sampled and mocked the "Message to B.A." skit before embarking on a full-blown tirade, the infamous "No Vaseline". In a series of verses, Ice Cube verbally assaulted the group: "You lookin' like straight bozos / I saw it comin' that's why I went solo / Kept on stompin' / When y'all Muthafuckas moved Straight outta Compton / You got jealous when I got my own company / But I'm a man, and ain't nobody humpin' me."

He also responded to members MC Ren, Dr. Dre, DJ Yella, and Eazy-E individually to "100 Miles and Runnin'", claiming "I started off with too much cargo / Dropped four niggaz and now I'm makin' all the dough", using homophobic metaphors to describe their unequal business relationship with Jerry Heller, who became the target of harsh insults: "Get rid of that devil real simple / Put a bullet in his temple / Cuz you can't be the 'Niggaz 4 Life' crew / With a white Jew tellin' you what to do." The song attracted controversy for its antisemitism (the beginning of such accusations against Ice Cube during his affiliation with the Nation of Islam), based on the bashing of Heller's religion.

The track was omitted from the UK release, and later pressings included a censored version of the song. In September 1990, members of hip-hop act Above the Law clashed with Ice Cube and his posse Da Lench Mob during the annual New Music Seminar conference, forcing the latter to flee the premises of Times Square's Marriott Marquis, the venue of the event. On January 27, 1991, Dr. Dre assaulted Dee Barnes, host of the hip-hop show Pump It Up, after its coverage of the N.W.A/Ice Cube beef. According to Rolling Stone reporter Alan Light:

He picked her up and "began slamming her face and the right side of her body repeatedly against a wall near the stairway" as his bodyguard held off the crowd. After Dre tried to throw her down the stairs and failed, he began kicking her in the ribs and hands. She escaped and ran into the women's rest room. Dre followed her and "grabbed her from behind by the hair and proceeded to punch her in the back of the head."

In response, Dre commented: "People talk all this shit, but you know, if somebody fucks with me, I'm gonna fuck with them. I just did it, you know. Ain't nothing you can do now by talking about it. Besides, it ain't no big thing—I just threw her through a door."

=== The end of N.W.A and death of Eazy-E (1991–1999) ===
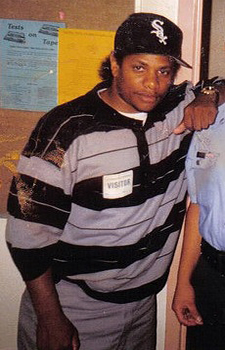
Eazy-E (pictured in 1993) feuded with almost every member of N.W.A, with the exception of DJ Yella, until his death in 1995.

1991's Niggaz4Life was the group's final album. After Dr. Dre, The D.O.C. and Michel'le departed from Ruthless to join Death Row Records and allegations over Eazy-E being coerced into signing away their contracts (while however retaining a portion of their publishing rights), a bitter rivalry ensued. Dr. Dre began the exchange in 1992 with Death Row's first release, "Fuck Wit Dre Day (And Everybody's Celebratin')", and its accompanying video featured a character named "Sleazy-E" (played by actor A.J. Johnson) who ran around desperately trying to get money. The insults continued on The Chronic with "Bitches Ain't Shit". Eazy-E responded in 1993 with the EP It's On (~~Dr. Dre~~) 187um Killa on the tracks "Real Muthaphuckkin G's" and "It's On".

Eazy-E accused Dr. Dre of being a homosexual, calling him a "she thang", and criticizing Dre's new image by calling him and Snoop "studio gangsters". The music video for "Real Muthaphuckkin G's" showed a still of Dre wearing make-up and a sequined jumpsuit. The photos dated back to Dr. Dre's World Class Wreckin' Cru days, when such fashion was common among West Coast electro hop artists, prior to N.W.A's popularization of gangsta rap. Eazy-E kept dissing Dre and Death Row on most of his songs until his AIDS-related death on March 26, 1995.

Despite continuing to work together after the N.W.A split, MC Ren voiced his strong criticism for Eazy-E in 1994, calling the latter a "big-head" and "wannabe mega-star", and even suggesting that N.W.A should reunite without him. MC Ren later said that the only relationship he had with Eazy-E was through Ruthless Records, where he released the platinum-selling EP Kizz My Black Azz (1992) and the album Shock of the Hour (1993). Eazy-E and MC Ren ended their feud shortly before the former's death in their 1995 duet '"Tha Muthaphukkin' Real" after two years of not talking to each other. All bad blood finally ceased within the rest of the group. Dr. Dre, MC Ren and Ice Cube later expressed their re-evaluated feelings to their old friend on 1998's "Ruthless for Life", 1999's "What's the Difference" and "Chin Check", 2000's "Hello", 2006's "Growin' Up", and in the 2011 music video "I Need a Doctor". DJ Yella was reportedly the only member of N.W.A who got along so well with Eazy-E that he dedicated his 1996 album One Mo Nigga ta Go to him.

=== Reunion of N.W.A, aborted third album and aftermath (1999–present) ===
Having both parted with Ruthless Records on bad terms, tensions between Ice Cube and Dr. Dre eventually eased on their own. After Ice Cube made a cameo appearance in Dr. Dre's "Let Me Ride" video in 1993, the two recorded the hit song "Natural Born Killaz" for Snoop Dogg's 1994 short film and soundtrack Murder Was the Case. Ice Cube also later appeared on MC Ren's album Ruthless for Life on the track "Comin' After You". MC Ren appeared on Dre's 1999 album 2001, and the three remaining N.W.A emcees reunited for "Hello" on Ice Cube's 2000 album War & Peace Vol. 2 (The Peace Disc), and the song "Chin Check" in 1999 for the Next Friday soundtrack, a movie starring Ice Cube.

The West Coast and "gangsta" music scene had however fallen out of the spotlight since the death of Tupac Shakur in 1996, and it was only after Dr. Dre's successful patronage of Eminem and Dre's ensuing comeback album 2001 that the genre and its artists regained the national spotlight. 2000's all-star Up In Smoke Tour reunited much of the N.W.A and Death Row families, and during time spent on the road, Dre, Ice Cube, MC Ren, featured special guest Snoop Dogg and Eminem began recording in a mobile studio. A comeback album entitled Not These Niggaz Again was planned (and included DJ Yella, who had not been present on the tour).

However, due to busy and conflicting schedules as well as the obstacles of coordinating three different record labels (Priority, No Limit and Interscope), obtaining the rights to the name N.W.A and endorsing the whole project to gain exclusive rights, the album never materialized. Only two tracks from these sessions were released: the aforementioned "Chin Check" (with Snoop Dogg as a member of N.W.A) from 2000's Next Friday soundtrack and "Hello" from Ice Cube's 2000 album War & Peace Vol. 2 (The Peace Disc). Both songs also appeared on N.W.A's remastered Greatest Hits. There were also partial reunions on other projects, notably "Set It Off", from Snoop Dogg's Tha Last Meal (2000), which featured MC Ren and Ice Cube, and The D.O.C.'s "The Shit", from his 2003 album Deuce, featuring MC Ren, Ice Cube, Snoop Dogg and Six-Two. Dr. Dre and DJ Yella were present in the studio for the latter song.

In addition to the Greatest Hits initially released by Priority in 1996, Capitol and Ruthless Records jointly released The N.W.A Legacy, Vol. 1: 1988–1998 in 1999, a compilation that contained songs by other rap artists and only three songs from the actual group but various solo tracks from the five members. The success of the album prompted a second volume, The N.W.A Legacy, Vol. 2, three years later. It emulated the format of its predecessor, containing only three genuine N.W.A tracks and many solo efforts by the crew members. In 2007, a new greatest hits package was released, entitled The Best of N.W.A: The Strength of Street Knowledge.

In 2014, Ice Cube appeared on MC Ren's remix for "Rebel Music". This was the first time the duo had worked together since the N.W.A reunion in 2000.

On June 27, 2015, MC Ren and DJ Yella joined Ice Cube during his solo set as part of the BET Experience show at the Staples Center in Los Angeles, California. This marked the first reunion performance of the group (minus Dr. Dre) in 15 years. Following a 27-year hiatus, the group reunited with surviving members Ice Cube, MC Ren, Dr. Dre and DJ Yella taking the stage during the second weekend of the Coachella Valley Music and Arts Festival in April 2016, just days following the group's Rock N' Roll Hall of Fame induction.

== Members ==
- Eric "Eazy-E" Wright – vocals (1987–1991; died 1995)
- Andre "Dr. Dre" Young – production, vocals (1987–1991, 1999–2001, 2016)
- O'Shea "Ice Cube" Jackson – vocals (1987–1989, 1999–2001, 2015, 2016)
- Kim "Arabian Prince" Nazel – production, vocals (1987–1989)
- Antoine "Yella" Carraby – DJ, production (1987–1991, 2000–2001, 2015, 2016)
- Lorenzo "MC Ren" Patterson – vocals (1988–1991, 1999–2001, 2015, 2016)

== Legacy ==
=== Musical legacy ===
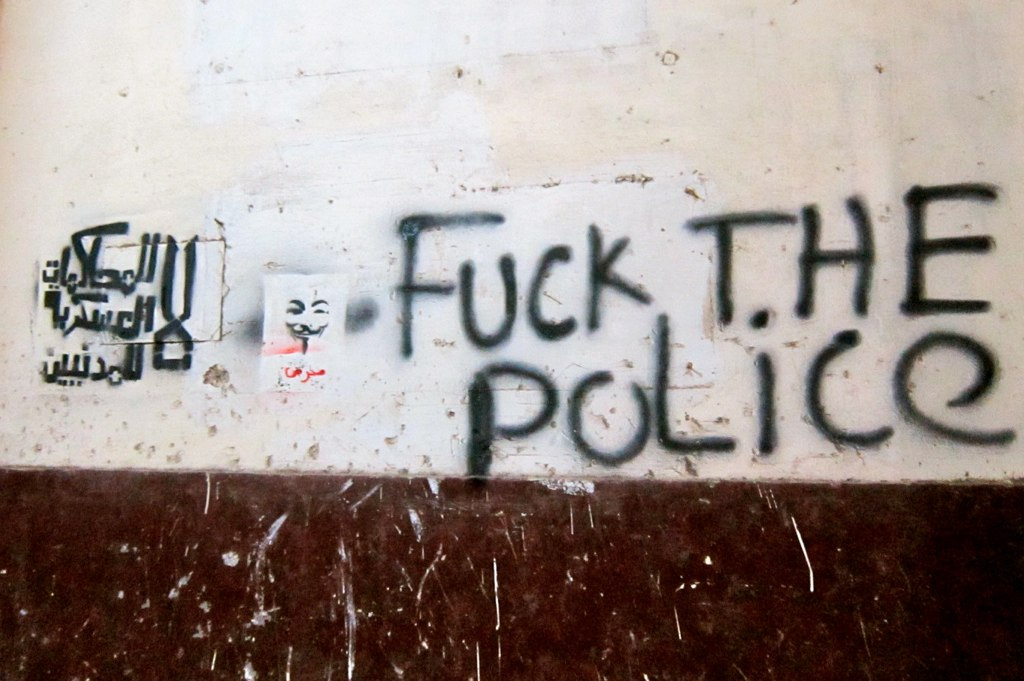
"Fuck the police" graffiti in Cairo, 2011

Although the group disbanded in 1991, it remains one of the greatest and most influential hip-hop groups, leaving a lasting legacy on hip-hop in the following decades. Its influence, from the use of funky, bass-driven beats to its exaggerated lyrics, was evident throughout the 1990s and even into the present, and is often credited as bridging the white/black American musical lines with its appeal to white Americans in the late 1980s. The group's influence, impact and initial rejection by critics and cultural elites was compared to the Sex Pistols for rock.

The first album of the group, Straight Outta Compton, has been described by Gerrick D. Kennedy as one of the loudest "big bangs" in hip-hop and "a sonic Molotov cocktail that ignited a firestorm when it debuted in the summer of 1988". In 2017, Straight Outta Compton was selected for preservation in the United States National Recording Registry by the Library of Congress, who deemed it to be "culturally, historically, or aesthetically significant".

They were influential in appearance of West and East Coast hip-hop genres and artists, as well in development of alternative and nu metal acts such as System of a Down, Slipknot, Korn and Limp Bizkit.

=== Political legacy ===
N.W.A were among the first to popularize political speech within rap.

Despite significant controversies regarding misogyny or homophobia in the lyrics of certain songs, the group left a significant mark on American politics, and more generally, worldwide. This was notably achieved by offering a dissenting discourse in response to the state speeches during the War on Crime era. Such discourse was later adopted by numerous artists. N.W.A's repeated attacks against the institutional racism of the American police, particularly with the song "Fuck tha Police", played a crucial role in the politicization of African-American youth and subsequently in the politicization of White American youth against police brutality and, more broadly, racism.

In the 1980s and 1990s, rap was perceived by American political elites as an "existential threat" to the United States social order. According to researcher Bryan J. McCann:

The political and cultural mainstream of the 1980s regarded gangsta rap as a genuine threat to the social order rather than a playful destabilization of the period’s law-and-order discourses. (...) Indeed, a seismic cultural force had emerged (...) NWA’s iconic album became a popular window into black inner-city life by enacting, exaggerating, and celebrating the practices and locales at the heart of 1980s law-and-order politics. In other words, the album represented an alternative, and business-savvy, rendition of the mark of criminality.

More specifically, the song "Fuck tha Police", like other songs from the group, became a symbol of resistance against neoliberalism.

=== Legacy among artists ===
In Dr. Dre's 1999 single "Forgot About Dre", Eminem paid homage to the group, rapping "So what do you say to somebody you hate / Or anyone tryna bring trouble your way? / Wanna resolve things in a bloodier way? / Just study a tape of N.W.A", possibly referring to the negative reception of N.W.A's works by mainstream radio, which considered the group's songs violent and thus unusable for radio.

A scene in the music video for the 2005 single "Hate It or Love It" by The Game featuring 50 Cent shows Tequan Richmond and Zachary Williams (portraying a youthful Game & 50 Cent respectively) being caught spraypainting "N.W.A" on a wall, resulting in their subsequent arrest by two policemen. The Game also has a tattoo that says "N.W.A" on the right side of his chest.

=== Biopic ===
New Line Cinema representatives announced to Entertainment Weekly's "Hollywood Insider Blog" that N.W.A's story was in development to become a feature film for theatrical release in 2012. However, it was delayed to sometime in 2014. The script was researched and written by filmmaker S. Leigh Savidge and radio veteran Alan Wenkus, who worked closely with Eazy-E's widow, Tomica Woods-Wright. Ice Cube and Dr. Dre act as producers of the film. In September 2011, John Singleton was selected as director. Ice Cube and Singleton previously collaborated on Boyz n the Hood, a movie that was nominated for an Academy Award, and Ice Cube also played the part of the character "Fudge" in Singleton's Higher Learning.

Casting calls began in the summer of 2010. There were rumors of Lil Eazy-E playing his late father Eazy-E, and Ice Cube's son and fellow rapper O'Shea Jackson Jr. playing his father as well. Ice Cube stated of the movie, "We're taking it to the nooks and crannies, I think deeper than any other article or documentary on the group," he said. "These are the intimate conversations that helped forge N.W.A To me, I think it's interesting to anybody who loves that era and I don't know any other movie where you can mix Gangster Rap, the F.B.I., L.A. riots, HIV, and fucking feuding with each other. This movie has everything from Darryl Gates and the battering ram."

In August 2012, F. Gary Gray was selected as director rather than Singleton. The film, named Straight Outta Compton, had been picked up by Universal Pictures who hired Jonathan Herman in December 2013 to draft a new script and brought in Will Packer to executive produce. On February 21, 2014, director F. Gary Gray announced a March 9, 2014 open casting call for the film via his Twitter account. There were also open casting calls in Atlanta and Chicago. Rapper YG auditioned to play MC Ren in the film. The project was scheduled to start filming in April 2014 but was pushed backed due to casting delays.

On June 18, 2014, Universal announced that the N.W.A biopic Straight Outta Compton would be released August 14, 2015. Ice Cube's son, O'Shea Jackson Jr., plays a younger version of his father in the movie, while Jason Mitchell plays Eazy-E, Corey Hawkins plays Dr. Dre, Aldis Hodge plays MC Ren, and Neil Brown Jr. plays DJ Yella. In early July 2014, casting directors for the N.W.A biopic issued a casting call for extras and vintage cars in the Los Angeles area for scenes in the movie. The film received positive reviews and grossed over $200 million worldwide.

=== Awards ===
Rolling Stone ranked N.W.A at number 83 on its list of the "100 Greatest Artists of All Time". In 2016, the group was inducted into the Rock and Roll Hall of Fame, following three previous nominations. In 2024, the group became the fourth hip-hop act to receive the Grammy Lifetime Achievement Award. (Note: They were preceded by fellow pioneering groups Run-DMC, Grandmaster Flash and the Furious 5 and Public Enemy.)

Straight Outta Compton was the first rap album ever to gain five stars from Rolling Stone at initial review, it placed 70th among the magazine's 500 Greatest Albums of All Time in its 2020 revised list. Time, in 2006, named it one of the 100 greatest albums of all time. Vibe appraised it as one of the 100 Essential Albums of the 20th Century. In 2012, Slant Magazine listed it 18th among the "Best Albums of the 1980s". In any case, in November 2016, Straight Outta Compton became the first rap album inducted into the Grammy Hall of Fame.

== Discography ==
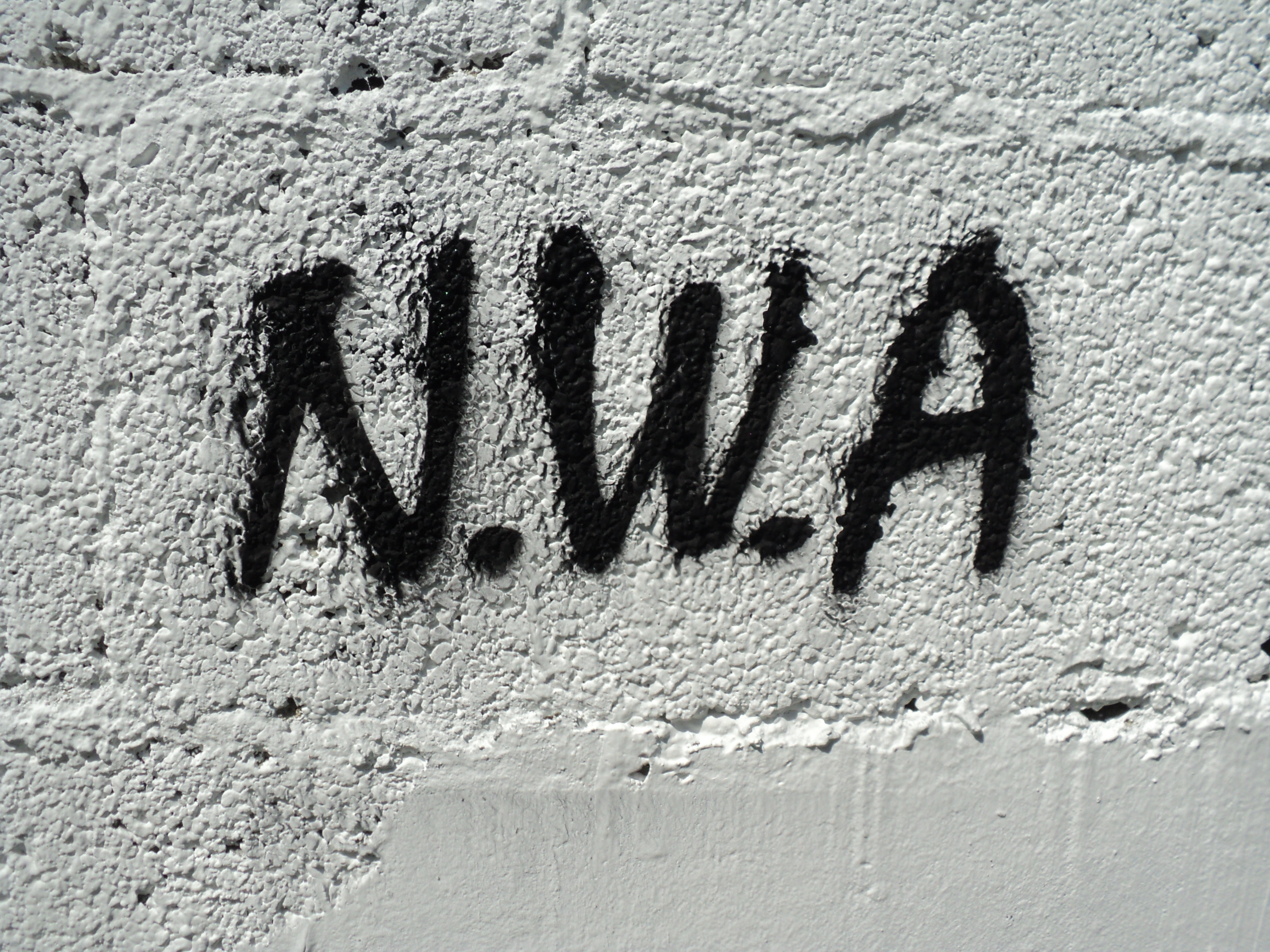
Graffiti of the N.W.A logo

Studio albums

- Straight Outta Compton (1989)
- Niggaz4Life (1991)

== Tour ==
- Bring the Noise Tour (December 1988 – January 1989) (Note: N.W.A joined Public Enemy and Ice-T on a handful of tour dates throughout the US.)
- Eazy Duz It Tour (June 1989 – September 1989) (Note: This tour was also commonly called the Straight Outta Compton Tour, as the setlists were typically divided between N.W.A and Eazy-E's solo set.)

== See also ==
- Fear of a Black Hat
