= 100 Miles and Runnin' (song) =

Single by N.W.A

from the album 100 Miles and Runnin'
- Released: 1990
- Recorded: 1990
- Genre: Hardcore hip hop
- Length: 4:35
- Label: Ruthless; Priority
- Songwriters: Lorenzo Patterson; Tracy Curry
- Producers: Dr. Dre; DJ Yella

N.W.A singles chronology
"Express Yourself" (1989)	"100 Miles and Runnin'" (1990)	"Alwayz into Somethin'" (1991)

Music video
- "100 Miles and Runnin'" on YouTube

"100 Miles and Runnin'" is a song by American hip-hop group N.W.A from their 1990 EP of the same name. The song also appeared on the N.W.A's Greatest Hits and The Best of N.W.A: The Strength of Street Knowledge compilation.

== Music video ==
In November 1990, a music video directed by Eric Meza was aired and released. In the video the intro begins with N.W.A members being arrested by the police and exactly when the song begins they flee and appear on several scenes including, jumping onto the roof of a moving car, fleeing to back of a van and others. In the end someone wears a baseball cap similar to the ones the band members wear, so the police get into the house and grab the cap, and they understand that it's someone else dressed similarly to the N.W.A members. Also in the middle of the video a car is seen exploding after MC Ren performs a front-flip over it. "100 Miles and Runnin'" also charted at No. 54 at U.S. Hot R&B.

== Controversy ==
"100 Miles and Runnin'" had sampled a two-second guitar chord from Funkadelic's "Get Off Your Ass and Jam" by lowering the pitch of the sample and playing it five times, but had paid no compensation to the owner, Bridgeport Music. Bridgeport brought the issue to a federal judge, who ruled that the sample was not in violation of copyright law. Later on, though, the decision was reversed by the U.S. Court of Appeals for the Sixth Circuit, who interpreted and ruled that using any sample without the original creator's permission was in violation of the law.

== Live performances ==
N.W.A performed the song live on The Arsenio Hall Show on September 28, 1990.

== Charts ==
Chart (1990–91)	Peak position
Australia (ARIA)	33
New Zealand (Recorded Music NZ)	32
UK (Official Charts Company)	38
US Hot R&B/Hip-Hop Singles & Tracks (Billboard)	51
U.S. Hot Rap Songs (Billboard)	2
