= Chin Check =

- "Chin Check" 12-inch vinyl

Single by N.W.A featuring Snoop Dogg

from the album Next Friday (Original Motion Picture Soundtrack)
- Released: August 23, 1999
- Recorded: 1999
- Genre: West Coast hip-hop; gangsta rap; hardcore hip hop
- Length: 3:41 (single edit); 4:24 (extended version w/ 9-1-1 intro)
- Label: Priority
- Songwriters: O'Shea Jackson; Calvin Broadus; Lorenzo Patterson; Andre Young
- Producer: Dr. Dre

N.W.A singles chronology
"The Dayz of Wayback" (1991)	"Chin Check" (1999)

Snoop Dogg singles chronology
"Bitch Please" (1999)	"Chin Check" (1999)	"Game Don't Wait" (1999)

"Chin Check" is a hip-hop song released in August 1999 by American rap group N.W.A. The song was released as the lead single for the soundtrack album Next Friday (Original Motion Picture Soundtrack), and features Snoop Dogg. Production for the song was handled solely by Dr. Dre, making it the first N.W.A song to feature no input by former member DJ Yella since N.W.A. and the Posse.

As well as serving as a promotion for the Next Friday soundtrack, the song was also set to promote a third N.W.A album, titled Not These Niggaz Again, due for release in 2000 before its cancellation. Snoop Dogg was also rumored to feature on the album, as he did on "Chin Check", as an official member of the group, filling in for the deceased Eazy-E, with Mel-Man, Dr. Dre's production partner at the time, slated to replace DJ Yella who had left to direct and produce pornography videos.

"Chin Check" marked N.W.A's first single since 1991's "The Dayz of Wayback", and their first collaboration with Ice Cube since he left the group in December 1989.

In 2003, the song, along with the follow-up single, "Hello", were included as bonus tracks on the rerelease of N.W.A's Greatest Hits. Chin Check would later also be included on the 2006 greatest hits album The Best of N.W.A: The Strength of Street Knowledge.

== Reception ==
Vibe gave the song a negative review stating that Dr. Dre's beat was "bland" and that MC Ren and Ice Cube sounded "geriatric" and "lukewarm" respectively.

== Charts ==
Chart performance for "Chin Check"
Chart (1999–2000)	Peak position
US Hot R&B/Hip-Hop Songs (Billboard)	71
