= Gangsta Gangsta =

- "Gangsta Gangsta" vinyl case

Single by N.W.A

from the album Straight Outta Compton
- B-side: "Something 2 Dance 2"
- Released: November 1988
- Recorded: 1988
- Genre: Gangsta rap; hardcore hip-hop
- Length: 5:36
- Label: Ruthless; Priority
- Songwriter: O'Shea Jackson
- Producers: Andre Young; Antoine Carraby; Kim Nazel

N.W.A singles chronology
| "Panic Zone" (1987) | "Gangsta Gangsta" (1988) | "Express Yourself" (1989) |

Audio
- "Gangsta Gangsta" by N.W.A. on YouTube

"Gangsta Gangsta" is a song from American hip-hop group N.W.A's 1989 album Straight Outta Compton. It was released as the album's first single in November 1988, and later appeared on the N.W.A Greatest Hits album and The Best of N.W.A: The Strength of Street Knowledge.

== Background ==
The song conveys the dangers of living in the streets of Compton, California and South Central Los Angeles but also speaks of the appealing side of "gangsta life". The song has been covered or otherwise remade several times since its release, among them include versions done by The Game and the 57th Street Rogue Dog Villians with Tech N9ne and a parody of the lyrics appear in "The Salaminizer" by Gwar.

The first three verses are delivered by Ice Cube. The fourth and final verse is delivered by Eazy-E. The song is interspersed with interjections from other N.W.A. members.

The song contains samples from "God Make Me Funky" by The Headhunters, "Weak at the Knees" by Steve Arrington, "My Philosophy" by Boogie Down Productions and "Be Thankful for What You Got" by William DeVaughn among others.

== Track listing ==
| No. | Title | Length |
|---|---|---|
| 1. | "Gangsta Gangsta" (radio edit) | 5:36 |
| 2. | "Something Like That" (radio edit) | 3:35 |
| 3. | "Gangsta Gangsta" (instrumental) | 4:04 |
| 4. | "Quiet on tha Set" | 3:59 |
| 5. | "Something 2 Dance 2" | 3:32 |

== Charts ==
| Chart (1989) | Peak position |
|---|---|
| Australia (ARIA Charts) | 141 |
| UK Singles (Official Charts) | 70 |
| US Hot R&B/Hip-Hop Songs (Billboard) | 91 |
| US Hot Rap Songs (Billboard) | 11 |
