= Niggaz4Life =

1991 studio album by N.W.A

Studio album by N.W.A
- Released: May 28, 1991
- Recorded: 1990
- Studio: Audio Achievements (Torrance, California)
- Genres: West Coast hip-hop; gangsta rap; G-funk; horrorcore; hardcore hip-hop
- Length: 55:35
- Labels: Ruthless; Priority
- Producers: Eazy-E (exec.); Dr. Dre; Yella

N.W.A chronology
| 100 Miles and Runnin' (1990) | Niggaz4Life (1991) | Greatest Hits (1996) |

Singles from Niggaz4Life
- 1. "Alwayz into Somethin'" Released: April 15, 1991; 2. "Appetite for Destruction" Released: May 18, 1991; 3. "The Dayz of Wayback" Released: 1991

Niggaz4Life (Note: also known as Efil4zaggin per its mirrored title as seen on the cover) is the second studio album by American hip-hop group N.W.A, released on May 28, 1991. It was their final album, as the group disbanded later that year after the departure of Dr. Dre and songwriter and unofficial member of the group The D.O.C., who both left to form Death Row Records; the album features only four members of the original lineup, as Arabian Prince and Ice Cube had left the group in early 1989 and late 1989, respectively. Niggaz4Life debuted at number 2 on the Billboard 200, but in its second week peaked at number 1.

In 1992, several months after the release of the album, N.W.A released a video named Niggaz4Life: The Only Home Video, which chronicled the making of the album and its three music videos, "Alwayz into Somethin'", "Appetite for Destruction", and "Approach to Danger".

In 2002, the CD was re-released in two formats. Both had the EP 100 Miles and Runnin' appended to the end of the original track listing, but one was available with a DVD copy of Niggaz4Life: The Only Home Video.

In comparison to its predecessor, Niggaz4Life is heavier on misogyny, for which it became notorious. The songs on the album's second half featured more profanity, sexist themes, and references to various sexual acts, provoking the ire of the PMRC, liberal and conservative politicians, and civil rights activist C. Delores Tucker.

== Songs ==
"Real Niggaz Don't Die" is a quaking tune that uses a descending heavy metal riff. It uses a soundbite of voices panning the group, before Yella counters with a diatribe aimed at "fake niggaz, house niggaz." Musical elements of "Appetite for Destruction" are comparable to Public Enemy's "Welcome to the Terrordome" (1990). Don't Drink That Wine" has undertones of doo-wop and concerns cocaine. "To Kill a Hooker", compared by reviewer Dele Fadele to a snuff film, features Dre and Yella describing in detail the gang rape and murder of a District Attorney's wife, presaging the stronger content of the album's second half. "Automobile", halfway through side two, is considered by Smith to be the first of the album's "surprises", as it is based around a rinky-dink piano and concerns "a frustrated fuck in the back seat of a car." "I'd Rather Fuck You", a crude pastiche of Philadelphia soul, is comparable to George Clinton and similar lustful soul songs, albeit more explicit. "Approach to Danger" was described by Smith as "an off-centre, eerie thing, all out-of-tune strings and dark, half-spoken delivery", and by critic Ray Suzuki as "essentially rapping over a Halloween FX record." "The Dayz of Wayback" is a tough track that portrays N.W.A. as the leaders of Compton's rap scene, punctuated by ragga intrusions "and a chaotic heap of noisy loops".

== Critical reception ==
Professional ratings
Review scores
| Source | Rating |
|---|---|
| AllMusic | 4/5 stars |
| Blender | 5/5 stars |
| Robert Christgau | C− |
| Los Angeles Times | 3.5/5 stars |
| NME | 7/10 (May 1991); 3/10 (November 1991) |
| Pitchfork | 8.8/10 |
| RapReviews | 9/10 |
| Rolling Stone | 3/5 stars |
| Spin Alternative Record Guide | 5/10 |
| The Washington Post | (favorable) |

Niggaz4Life polarized music critics, mainly over its lyrics, especially in the second half. The Source declared it one of its albums of the year but more mainstream publications like Rolling Stone condemned the album. In a two-star review (out of five), Rolling Stone critic Arion Berger called Niggaz4Life "so hateful toward women, and in such a pathetic and sleazy manner, that it's simply tiresome." Mark Blackwell, of Spin magazine, wrote that Niggaz4Life "wears thin pretty fast. The main problem is that the old 'niggas' and 'bitches' thing—whether offensive or not—is getting a little tired", but conceded, "Dre and Yella's production is peerless."

Newsweek wrote, "by N.W.A standards, [it] is a mediocre work, a retreat from cinematic storytelling into simple punk bluster." Time wrote, "N.W.A. raps nasty and righteous, with real ghetto heat, and doesn't give an inch," calling the album "incendiary" and "grotesque."

Although he enjoyed two songs, Andrew Smith of Melody Maker dismissed the album's lyrical boasts as unconvincing, moving "so far outside the confines of reality" that the group members "have made themselves into cartoon characters", adding that N.W.A. "sorely miss Ice Cube's intelligence" and had become "the Jimmy Greaves of rap." NME's Ian McCann similarly lamented the loss of Ice Cube, saying Niggaz4Life lacks "the tension" of Compton, but still deemed it "effective funk" and praised N.W.A.'s more adventurous beats, commenting that the "introductions take P-Funk chat circa 1974 to new levels and the samples on the songs proper are cleverly layered even when you've heard 'em before. McCann also felt parts of the album reveal "the rap-soul hybrid" of Dre's earlier group World Class Wreckin' Cru, due to Easy E's funk inflections and the greater emphasis on reggae than Compton, "but it's still played for laughs." Reviewing it for NME again, following its re-release in November 1991 after the legal victory, Dele Fadele panned N.W.A. for their commercial motivations, opining that Niggaz4life "isn't just obscene, it's positively subhuman", adding: "As if black people don't have enough problems with stereotypes, its portrayal of 'real niggaz' as pea-brained, amoral Neanderthals who think with their penises, hate everything about women but their reproductive organs, and enjoy nothing better than to kill their own type, is by turns amazing in its cruelty and sadder than dusk."

Later DJ Yella said: “I do like the second album better than the first. The first one had more hits, but production-wise I like this one better. It would have been great if Cube would have got on that album. But it sounds better, we put more into it.” MC Ren said: “The people in the streets loved it. That was basically the best review we could get anyway.”

The album has since received more positive reviews, especially for the production. Tom Doggett of Rap Reviews said: "Niggaz4life is a frightening album, jammed with explosive beats, visceral skits, and inciting rhymes. There is an overwhelming sense of sensual stimulation that overcomes the room when this album is playing. The eighteen tracks move by effortlessly, jumping from shootout skits to Ice Cube disses to revolting accounts of sexual acts. Even if you are turned off, it is impossible to deny the kinetic force that exudes from this album."

Jesse Ducker of Albumism also praised the production and said: "Efil4zaggin stands as a very dope, albeit flawed, piece of work." Ray Suzuki of Pitchfork named the album "about as close as you can come to a death metal/hip-hop hybrid", adding that the group had upped its status as "icons of shock-rap" to the point where it sounded like "they've actually gone insane", noting the explicit song titles, and the influence of sadomasochism and phencyclidine in Eazy-E's lyrics and the adventurous music: "The songs here sound like the Bomb Squad in the graveyard Superfly got buried in. ... It's complexly debauched, fantastically jagged terror-hop that at its best challenges anything on Fear of a Black Planet and at its worst challenges anything off Dre's 2001."

=== Accolades ===
- Ranked #1 in The Source's Top 15 Albums of 1991 list in 1991
- Ranked #7 in MTV's Greatest Hip-Hop Albums of All Time list in 2005

"It seemed like the craziest shit in existence to me. When I heard Eazy-E do a country and western song [Automobile], I couldn't believe the audacity and creative genius. Then, when I looked at the album cover and they were all dead, with their spirits flying out of their bodies, and the title was printed backwards so you had to put it up to the mirror to read it the right way, I said, 'These motherfuckers are crazy!'" – Busta Rhymes

== Commercial performance ==
The album debuted at number 2 on the US Billboard Top LPs chart. It went on to top the Billboard 200, allegedly gaining 954,000 sales in its first week becoming the first gangsta rap album to top the chart, and the first independently distributed album to top the chart.

== Ban from sale in Britain and legal case ==
On June 4, 1991, thousands of copies of Niggaz4Life—reportedly 12,000 or 23,000—were seized by officers of the Obscene Publications Squad from PolyGram's distribution plant in Chadwell Heath, England, following a complaint to New Scotland Yard by a music retailer who had received an advance copy of the album from Island Records. Of the reported 12,000 copies, 5,750 were LPs, 5,191 were CDs and 1,406 were cassettes, and cost Island over £120,000 in stock. In the days that followed, reports emerged that further copies were seized by the police in the Swindon and Southampton branches of Our Price; Our Price immediately withdrew the album from sale nationwide, fearing further legal action, with other music retailers looking to follow its example. By 22 June, it had been reported that the album was banned from all major British retailers. The Obscene Publications Squad also sent a copy of the album to the Crown Prosecution Service, whose verdict would influence the squad on whether further action was necessary. This was considered an important test case with regard to the future of censorship and the British music industry.

At the time of the album's withdrawal from retailers, it was expected to enter the UK Albums Chart at number 16 or 17, but the forced withdrawal ensured it stalled at number 25. In the U.S., where the record was more successful, it escaped censorship. Island Records, parent company of 4th & Broadway (which released the album), sought legal advice in the face of possible charges for issuing an album of a "depraved and corrupt nature". Its head of press, Rob Partridge, criticized the country's obscenity laws as an "imprecise art" and said that while many people would be offended by the lyrical content of Niggaz4life, audiences who buy N.W.A. releases would know what to expect, and Island had added the warning "Not to be played in the presence of minors" on British copies, like the 'Parental Advisory' label on American copies. Those in the music industry who condemned the banning included Alternative Tentacles boss Bill Gilliam and singer Sinead O'Connor, the latter of whom said, "no one should have the right to decide what the general public listen to. In effect, what the authorities have done is ban the record without going through any sort of legal procedure." She noted that N.W.A.'s attitudes were not unique, adding that by "banning the LP, or any similar material, people are just becoming blind to the realities of life." On August 13, police applied to the Redbridge Magistrates Court hoping to destroy all remaining copies of the album per Section 3 of the Obscene Publications Act, with a hearing set for September 4 that later adjourned until November 7. By August 27, Island criticized the British Phonographic Industry for failing to support them, saying their indifference proved that "the music industry is divided over the issue".

As the legal case continued, Island QC Geoffrey Robertson told the elder magistrates at the Redbridge Court—who were described as unfamiliar with hip-hop culture—that while they might find the album's strong content "utterly hateful", it was not "obscene in law", and qualified that doses of humour balanced the album's use of strong language, references to drugs and oral sex and attacks on police, comparing them to rugby songs. Other witnesses for Island included journalist and musician David Toop, Wendy K of Talkin' Loud (a former employee of the Department of Education), radio DJ Sonia Fraser of Kiss FM and an Aston University research director who had used the album's banning as the bases for a research project concerning the effects of mass media. Toop defended the album as a "strong, almost nightmarish picture of its environment" that bleakly and effectively mirrored the areas and social conditions depicted, while Wendy K said that it was "extremely important for people to know how the over half live", with regards to how N.W.A. "depict a crazy, confused, mixed-up world and report on it."

On November 7, N.W.A. and Island were cleared of obscenity charges after only fifteen minutes of deliberation. Island, which was allowed to retrieve the confiscated copies of the album from the police warehouse later that day, also received £1,350 in compensation from the police. Eazy E, who was surprised at the initial banning, was also surprised that the ban was overturned and impressed that the album was played in court, adding: "I didn't know how it would go today to tell the truth but I'm happy. Now everybody can hear what's going on. It pisses me off that my career is in the hands of someone who doesn't even know what rap is. I think censorship is fucked up."

== Track listing ==
Songwriting credits are adapted from the CD liner notes. All songs produced by Dr. Dre and DJ Yella.

| No. | Title | Writer(s) | Performer(s) | Length |
|---|---|---|---|---|
| 1. | "Prelude" | Lorenzo Patterson | MC Ren; Dr. Dre; Above The Law; Kokane; Admiral D | 2:27 |
| 2. | "Real Niggaz Don't Die" | Patterson; Tracy Curry | MC Ren; Dr. Dre; Eazy-E | 3:40 |
| 3. | "Niggaz 4 Life" | Patterson; Curry | MC Ren; Dr. Dre; Eazy-E | 4:58 |
| 4. | "Protest" (Interlude) | | Dr. Dre | 0:53 |
| 5. | "Appetite for Destruction" | Patterson; Curry; Jerry Long Jr. | MC Ren; Dr. Dre; Eazy-E | 3:22 |
| 6. | "Don't Drink That Wine" (Interlude) | | Dr. Dre; The D.O.C | 1:07 |
| 7. | "Alwayz into Somethin'" | Patterson; Curry | MC Ren; Dr. Dre; Admiral D | 4:24 |
| 8. | "Message to B.A." (Interlude) | | Dr. Dre | 0:48 |
| 9. | "Real Niggaz" | Patterson; Curry | MC Ren; Dr. Dre; Eazy-E; DJ Yella | 4:27 |
| 10. | "To Kill a Hooker" (Interlude) | | MC Ren; Eazy-E | 0:50 |
| 11. | "One Less Bitch" | Patterson; Curry | MC Ren; Dr. Dre | 4:47 |
| 12. | "Findum, Fuckum & Flee" | Patterson; Vince Edwards; Curry | MC Ren; Dr. Dre; Eazy-E; CPO | 3:55 |
| 13. | "Automobile" | Eric Wright | Dr. Dre; Eazy-E | 3:15 |
| 14. | "She Swallowed It" | Patterson | MC Ren | 4:13 |
| 15. | "I'd Rather Fuck You" (featuring Jewell & Michel'le) | Wright | Eazy-E; Jewell | 3:57 |
| 16. | "Approach to Danger" | Wright; Patterson | MC Ren; Dr. Dre; Eazy-E | 2:45 |
| 17. | "1-900-2-Compton" (Interlude) | | Warren G; Dr. Dre | 1:27 |
| 18. | "The Dayz of Wayback" | Patterson; Curry | MC Ren; Dr. Dre; Admiral D | 4:15 |

2002 bonus tracks: 100 Miles and Runnin'
| No. | Title | Writer(s) | Performer(s) | Length |
|---|---|---|---|---|
| 19. | "100 Miles and Runnin'" | Patterson; Curry | MC Ren; Dr. Dre; Eazy-E | 4:32 |
| 20. | "Just Don't Bite It" | Patterson; Curry | MC Ren | 5:28 |
| 21. | "Sa Prize (Part 2)" | Patterson; Curry | MC Ren; Dr. Dre; Eazy-E | 5:59 |
| 22. | "Kamurshol" | Patterson | MC Ren; Dr. Dre; Eazy-E | 1:56 |

== Sample credits ==
"Prelude"

- "Hyperbolicsyllabicsesquedalymistic" by Isaac Hayes
- "The Breakdown (Part II)" by Rufus Thomas

"Real Niggaz Don't Die"

- "UFO" by ESG
- "Different Strokes" by Syl Johnson
- "Die Nigger!!!" by The Last Poets
- "Rise Above" by Black Flag
- "Long Red" by Mountain
- "I Just Want to Celebrate" by Rare Earth
- "Synthetic Substitution" by Melvin Bliss
- "Hook and Sling" by Eddie Bo
- "Big Beat" by Billy Squier
- "Triple Threat" by Z-3 MC's

"Niggaz 4 Life"

- "Die Nigger!!!" by The Last Poets
- "Sir Nose d'Voidoffunk (Pay Attention - B3M)" by Parliament
- "Flashlight" by Parliament
- "N.T." by Kool & the Gang
- "(Don't Worry) If There's a Hell Below, We're All Going to Go" by Curtis Mayfield
- "Niggers Are Scared of a Revolution" by The Last Poets
- "Cissy Strut" by The Meters
- "Fool Yourself" by Little Feat

"Appetite for Destruction"

- "Think (About It)" by Lyn Collins
- "Funky Stuff" by Kool and the Gang
- "Get Me Back on Time, Engine No. 9" by Wilson Pickett
- "Niggers vs. the Police" by Richard Pryor

"Don't Drink That Wine"

- "I've Been Watching You (Move Your Sexy Body)" by Parliament
- "If It Ain't Ruff" by N.W.A

"Alwayz into Somethin'"

- "Stone to the Bone" by James Brown
- "Storm King" by Bob James
- "Sneakin' in the Back" by Tom Scott and The L.A. Express
- "Remember" by Jimi Hendrix
- "Synthetic Substitution" by Melvin Bliss
- "Just Wanna Make A Dream Come True" by Mass Production

"Message to B.A."

- "Prelude" by N.W.A

"Real Niggaz"

- "Give it Up" by Kool & the Gang
- "Got to Be Real" by Cheryl Lynn
- "Gashman" by The Last Poets
- "The Lovomaniacs" by Boobie Knight & the Universal Lady

"To Kill a Hooker"

- "Can't Stay Away" by Bootsy Collins

"One Less Bitch"

- "Zimba Ku" by Black Heat
- "Funkin' 4 Jamaica" by Tom Browne
- "I'm Gonna Love You Just a Little More, Babe" by Barry White

"Findum, Fuckum & Flee"

- "Rapper's Delight" by the Sugarhill Gang
- "The Breakdown, Pt. 1" by Rufus Thomas

"Automobile"

- "My Automobile" by Parliament

"She Swallowed It"

- "Cardova" by The Meters
- "I'm Gonna Love You Just a Little More, Babe" by Barry White
- "That Girl is a Slut" by Just-Ice
- "Slack Jawed Leroy" by Leroy & Skillet with LaWanda Page

"I'd Rather Fuck You"

- "I'd Rather Be with You" by Bootsy Collins

"Approach to Danger"

- "AJ Scratch" by Kurtis Blow
- "Get up & Get Down" by The Dramatics
- "Get Me Back on Time, Engine No. 9" by Wilson Pickett
- "God Made Me Funky" by The Headhunters
- "Scorpio" by Lalo Schifrin
- "This Is It" by Jimmy Spicer

"1-900-2-Compton"

- "P. Funk (Wants to Get Funked Up)" by Parliament

"The Dayz of Wayback"

- "Troglodyte" by Jimmy Castor Bunch
- "Impreach the President" by The Honey Drippers
- "Players Balling (Players Doin' Their Own Thing)" by Ohio Players
- "On the Ill Tip" by LL Cool J
- "Surprises" by The Last Poets
- "Niggaz4Life" by N.W.A

== Appearances ==
| Artist | Notes |
|---|---|
| MC Ren | performs on 11 tracks |
| Dr. Dre | performs on 9 tracks |
| Eazy-E | performs on 9 tracks |
| DJ Yella | performs on 1 track |

== Charts ==
=== Weekly charts ===
| Chart (1991) | Peak position |
|---|---|
| UK Albums (Official Charts) | 25 |
| US Billboard 200 | 1 |
| US Top R&B/Hip-Hop Albums (Billboard) | 1 |

=== Year-end charts ===
| Chart (1991) | Position |
|---|---|
| US Billboard 200 | 50 |
| US Top R&B/Hip-Hop Albums (Billboard) | 35 |

== Certifications ==
| Region | Certification | Certified units/sales |
|---|---|---|
| United Kingdom (BPI) sales since 2002 | Silver | 60,000^{‡} |
| United States (RIAA) | Platinum | 1,000,000^{^} |
^{^} Shipments figures based on certification alone.^{‡} Sales+streaming figures based on certification alone.
