= Alwayz into Somethin' =

"Alwayz Into Somethin'"
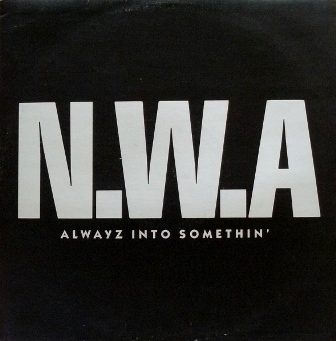

Single by N.W.A featuring Admiral Dancehall

from the album Niggaz4Life
- B-side: "Express Yourself, Somethin 2 Dance 2"
- Released: April 15, 1991
- Genre: G-funk
- Length: 4:24
- Label: Ruthless; Priority
- Songwriters: Lorenzo Patterson; Tracy Curry
- Producers: Dr. Dre; DJ Yella

N.W.A singles chronology
"100 Miles and Runnin'" (1990)	"Alwayz Into Somethin'" (1991)	"Appetite for Destruction" (1991)

Music video
- "Alwayz Into Somethin'" on YouTube

"Alwayz Into Somethin'" is a song by American hip hop group N.W.A, performed by Dr. Dre and MC Ren featuring Admiral Dancehall. It is the lead single from their second and final studio album, Niggaz4Life. The song also appeared on the N.W.A's Greatest Hits album and The Best of N.W.A: The Strength of Street Knowledge.

== History ==
The song is an early example of G-funk produced by Dr. Dre. His commercially successful solo debut, The Chronic, further developed the subgenre with beats, samples, and instrumentation similar to the one used in "Alwayz into Somethin'". The song was featured in Grand Theft Auto: San Andreas, on the West Coast gangsta rap station, Radio Los Santos.

In a part of the lyrics, MC Ren disses Ice Cube in the line, "Dre I was speakin' to your bitch O'Shea", referring to Ice Cube leaving the group over royalty disputes.

== Music video ==
In the music video, N.W.A's members are shown shoplifting, stealing cars, shooting at rival gang members, blowing things up, being arrested and thrown in jail, and generally making a nuisance of themselves. The video depicts scenes of murder and gang violence. The D.O.C. makes a cameo appearance.
