= Fuck tha Police =

1989 song by N.W.A

Song by N.W.A

from the album Straight Outta Compton
- Released: January 25, 1989
- Genre: Hardcore rap; political rap; gangsta rap
- Length: 5:43
- Label: Priority; Ruthless
- Songwriters: O'Shea Jackson; Lorenzo Patterson; Tracy Curry
- Producers: Dr. Dre; DJ Yella

Audio
- "Fuck tha Police" by N.W.A. on YouTube

Audio sample
- "A sample of Ice Cube's verse on the song": file; help

"Fuck tha Police" (Note: Often censored as "____ tha Police (Fill In The Blanks)", "F___ tha Police" or "F**k tha Police".) is a protest song by American rap group N.W.A that appears on the 1989 album Straight Outta Compton as well as on the N.W.A's Greatest Hits compilation. The lyrics protest police brutality and racial profiling and the song was ranked number 425 on Rolling Stone's 2004 list of the 500 Greatest Songs of All Time. In 2021, Rolling Stone re-ranked the song at number 190 in an updated list, and in 2025, the publication ranked the song at number 10 on its list of "The 100 Best Protest Songs of All Time."

Since its release in 1989, the "Fuck tha Police" slogan continues to influence popular culture in the form of T-shirts, artwork, political expression, and has transitioned into other genres as seen in the cover versions by Bone Thugs-n-Harmony, Dope, Rage Against the Machine, and Kottonmouth Kings.

== Composition ==
Prior to the song being recorded, both Ice Cube and Dr. Dre were nervous about potentially doing so. Visiting his friend and fellow rapper Phoenix Phil in Phoenix, after showing him the lyrics and hearing his reaction, Cube decided to throw away the lyrics to the song, but his friend was excited about the song and retrieved it from the trash, and when he later showed it to Eazy-E, he expressed enthusiasm as well.

"Fuck tha Police" parodies court proceedings, inverting them by presenting Dr. Dre as a judge hearing a prosecution of the police department. Three members of the group, Ice Cube, MC Ren, and Eazy-E, take the stand to "testify" before the judge as prosecutors. Through the lyrics, the rappers criticize the local police force. Two interludes present re-enactments of stereotypical racial profiling and police brutality.

At the end, the jury finds the police department guilty of being a "redneck, white-bread, chicken-shit motherfucker." A police officer, who is revealed to be the defendant, contests that the arguments presented were all lies and starts to demand justice as Dr. Dre orders him out of the courtroom, prompting the police officer to yell obscenities as he is led out.

== FBI letter ==
The song prompted the FBI to write to N.W.A's record company about the lyrics, expressing disapproval and arguing that the song misrepresented police.

In his autobiography Ruthless, the band's manager Jerry Heller wrote that the letter was actually a rogue action by a "single pissed-off bureaucrat with a bully pulpit" named Milt Ahlerich, who was falsely purporting to represent the FBI as a whole and that the action "earned him a transfer to the Bureau's backwater Hartford office". Heller also wrote that he removed all sensitive documents from the office of Ruthless Records in case of an FBI raid.

In the letter, Ahlerich went on to reference "78 law enforcement officers" who were "feloniously slain in the line of duty during 1988" and that recordings such as those produced by N.W.A "were both discouraging and degrading to these brave, dedicated officers". Ahlerich did not mention any N.W.A song by name in the letter, but later confirmed he was referring to "Fuck tha Police".

== Censorship ==
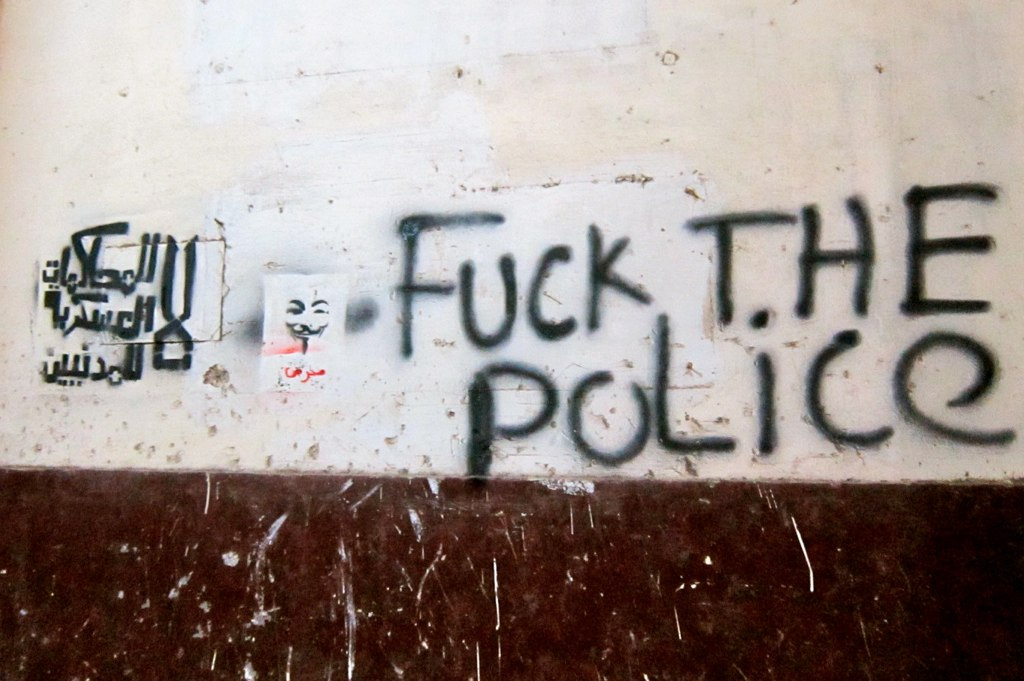
"Fuck the police" graffiti in Cairo, 2011

In 1989, Australian youth radio station Triple J had been playing "Fuck tha Police" (the only radio station in the world to do so) for up to six months, before being banned by Australian Broadcasting Corporation management following a campaign by a Liberal senator from South Australia. As a reaction, Triple J staff went on strike and put N.W.A's "Express Yourself" on continuous play from 9am until 4.30pm (AEST), totalling 82 plays. The song was preceded on each occasion by a speech explaining that due to industrial action, normal transmission had been interrupted. It was revealed in 2005 that the scratch sound from that track was sampled for the Triple J news theme.

On 10 April 2011, New Zealand musician Tiki Taane was arrested on charges of "disorderly behaviour likely to cause violence to start or continue" after performing the song at a gig in a club in Tauranga during an inspection of the club by the police. On April 13th, Tiki told Marcus Lush on Radio Live that the lyrics often feature in his performances and his arrest came as a complete surprise.

== Notable references in popular culture ==
- The song and the group were parodied in the 1994 hip-hop mockumentary film Fear of a Black Hat and its soundtrack album, as a single for the fictional gangsta-rap group N.W.H. (Niggaz With Hats) as "Fuck the Security Guards."
- The song is referenced in Lil Wayne's hit 2008 single "Mrs. Officer", but in a much more literal sense.
- It is prominently featured in the 2015 biopic of N.W.A, also called Straight Outta Compton.
- The song was satirically referenced in South Park's season 19 episode "Naughty Ninjas", when the townspeople are protesting the police.
- The song appears in Jordan Peele's 2019 film Us, when a virtual assistant mishears a character asking to call the police, instead playing the song.
- In the 2026 John Madden biopic Madden, there's a scene where Al Davis plays the song for Madden but Madden requests that he turn the tape off because he objects to the anti-police lyrics.

== Charts ==
Chart performance of "Fuck tha Police"
| Chart (2015) | Peak position |
|---|---|
| Australia (ARIA) | 49 |
| UK Singles (Official Charts) | 97 |
| US Hot R&B/Hip-Hop Songs (Billboard) | 25 |

== Certifications ==
Certifications for "Fuck tha Police"
| Region | Certification | Certified units/sales |
|---|---|---|
| Canada (Music Canada) | Gold | 40,000^{*} |
| Denmark (IFPI Danmark) | Gold | 45,000^{‡} |
| New Zealand (RMNZ) | Platinum | 30,000^{‡} |
| United Kingdom (BPI) | Gold | 400,000^{‡} |
^{*} Sales figures based on certification alone.^{‡} Sales+streaming figures based on certification alone.

== See also ==
- "Cop Killer"
- "The Guns of Brixton", a 1979 song by The Clash born of similar frustration with police tactics
- Rodney King
- 1992 Los Angeles riots
- George Floyd protests
- Driving while black
- Police brutality in the United States
