= Straight Outta Compton (song) =

Song by N.W.A

from the album Straight Outta Compton
- A-side: "Express Yourself"
- Released: January 25, 1989
- Recorded: 1988
- Studio: Audio Achievements, Torrance, California
- Genre: Gangsta rap; West Coast hip-hop; hardcore hip-hop
- Length: 4:18; 4:03 (clean version); 4:54 (extended mix)
- Label: Ruthless; Priority
- Songwriters: O'Shea Jackson; Lorenzo Patterson; Tracy Curry
- Producers: Dr. Dre; DJ Yella

Music video
- "Straight Outta Compton" on YouTube

"Straight Outta Compton" is a song by American hip-hop group N.W.A. It is the opening track from their 1989 debut album of the same name. The song samples "You'll Like It Too" by Funkadelic, "West Coast Poplock" by Ronnie Hudson and the Street People, "Get Me Back on Time, Engine No. 9" by Wilson Pickett, and "Amen, Brother" by the Winstons. It was voted number 19 on About.com's Top 100 Rap Songs, and is ranked number six on VH1's 100 Greatest Songs of Hip-Hop.

In 2015, "Straight Outta Compton" debuted at number 38 on the Billboard Hot 100 on the issue dated September 5, 2015 as a result of the recent releases of the group's film of the same name and Dr. Dre's Compton; it was the highest debut on the chart that week. This became the group's first top 40 hit song, in large part due to lack of airplay since N.W.A was banned from many radio stations in the 1980s, charting 26 years after its initial release and 24 years since the group originally disbanded. In 2021, Rolling Stone listed the song at number 248 on their updated list of the 500 Greatest Songs of All Time.

== Content ==
"Straight Outta Compton" is a hip-hop song. The group N.W.A. comes from Compton in Southern California. The opening verse is rapped by Ice Cube. MC Ren delivers the second, and Eazy-E the third verse. Dr. Dre does the intro as well as introducing Eazy E's verse. Eazy-E also introduces MC Ren's verse.

== Tributes ==
The song, especially Ice Cube's verse is referenced quite often by rappers, and not infrequently by Cube himself. In the song "Compton" by the Game, he says "Nigga, I'ma keep on stompin', comin' straight outta Compton".

== Music video ==
The video, directed by Rupert Wainwright, features Dr. Dre, Ice Cube, Eazy-E, MC Ren, Krazy Dee, and DJ Yella. The video shows the group walking and posing throughout various parts of the city of Compton. Ice Cube and Ren are chased by the police during their verses, arrested, and put in a holding van. Eazy-E's verse shows him riding alongside the van in a convertible, yelling at the driver who ignores him. As the van leaves the neighborhood local residents throw rocks at it. It first aired in May 1989.

== Cover art ==
The record cover image for the "Straight Outta Compton" single and maxi-single covers, known as "The Bleacher Shot" was created by Greek-American photographer (and regular Priority Records free-lancer), Ithaka Darin Pappas. The black-and-white version of the picture used on the cover was converted from the color original. The picture, which was not scheduled to be used as a cover image, was made spontaneously on March 14, 1989, at MacArthur Park, Los Angeles, while N.W.A was waiting for a film crew to arrive at the park to interview them. The Bleacher Shot has also been used as a color poster for Word Up! and as part of N.W.A.'s induction ceremony and official printed program at the 2016 Rock and Roll Hall of Fame ceremony in Brooklyn and also appeared in the 2016 photography book, Beyond South Central: Rap legends N.W.A. as seen thru the lens of Ithaka Darin Pappas (1988–1990) [Sweatlodge Publishing].

== Charts ==
=== Charts ===
Chart (2011–15)	Peak position
Ireland (IRMA)	63
UK Singles (Official Charts)	66
US Billboard Hot 100	38
US Hot R&B/Hip-Hop Songs (Billboard)	13
US Hot Rap Songs (Billboard)	9

== Certifications ==
Region	Certification	Certified units/sales
New Zealand (RMNZ)	2× Platinum	60,000^{‡}
United Kingdom (BPI)	Platinum	600,000^{‡}
United States (RIAA)	Platinum	1,000,000^{‡}
^{‡} Sales+streaming figures based on certification alone.
