= Next Friday (soundtrack) =

Next Friday (Original Motion Picture Soundtrack)

Soundtrack album by various artists
- Released: December 14, 1999
- Recorded: 1999
- Studios: The Hit Factory (New York); Encore (Burbank, California); Noontime (Atlanta); Ruthless Records; Sony Music (New York); 36 Chambers (New York); Backroom (Glendale, California); Record One (Los Angeles); Fred's Tilt; The Village Recorder (Los Angeles)
- Genres: Hip hop; R&B
- Length: 1:00:47
- Label: Priority
- Producers: Ice Cube; Angela Winbush; Baby Paul; Bass Brothers; Dat Nigga Reb; Diggie Doms; Donald "One Eye" Saunders; Donnie Scantz; Dr. Dre; Fredwreck; Irv Gotti; Jerry Duplessis; Jimmy "JT" Thomas; Kenny Jones; Mannie Fresh; Mathematics; Super Sako; Teddy Bishop; Vachik Aghaniats

Singles from Next Friday
- 1. "Chin Check" Released: August 23, 1999; 2. "You Can Do It" Released: November 16, 1999; 3. "Money Stretch" Released: 1999; 4. "I Don't Wanna" Released: January 11, 2000; 5. "Low Income" Released: 2000

Professional ratings
Review scores
Source	Rating
AllMusic	2.5/5 stars
Los Angeles Times	1/4 stars

Next Friday (Original Motion Picture Soundtrack) is the soundtrack album to Steve Carr's 2000 comedy film Next Friday. It was released on December 14, 1999, before the film came out in theatres through Priority Records and consisted of hip hop and R&B music.

Recording sessions took place at The Hit Factory, Sony Music Studios and 36 Chambers Studio in New York, at Encore Studios in Burbank, at Noontime Studios in Atlanta, at Backroom Studios in Glendale, at Record One and The Village Recorder in Los Angeles, at Ruthless Records Recording Studio, and at Fred's Tilt. Production was handled by Angela Winbush, Baby Paul, Bass Brothers, Dat Nigga Reb, Diggie Doms, Donald "One Eye" Saunders, Donnie Scantz, Dr. Dre, Fredwreck, Irv Gotti, Jerry Duplessis, Jimmy "JT" Thomas, Kenny Jones, Mannie Fresh, Mathematics, Super Sako, Teddy Bishop, Vachik Aghaniats and Wyclef Jean, with compilation producer Ice Cube and executive producers Andrew Shack, Lori Silfen, Mark Kaufman, Mitch Rotter, Paul Broucek and Toby Emmerich.

It features appearances from Mack 10, Aaliyah, Big Tymers, Bizzy Bone, Don Cisco, Eminem, Ja Rule, Kid Frost, Krayzie Bone, Kurupt, Lil' Wayne, Lil' Zane, Lyric, Ms. Toi, Pharoahe Monch, Sam Dates, Soopafly, The Isley Brothers, Toni Estes, Vita, Wu-Tang Clan, Wyclef Jean, and the reunited N.W.A with Snoop Dogg as a one-time member.

The soundtrack reached number 19 on the Billboard 200 and number 5 on the Top R&B/Hip-Hop Albums chart in the United States. It was certified gold by the Recording Industry Association of America on July 11, 2000, for selling 500,000 units. It also spawned six singles: Ice Cube's "You Can Do It", Lil' Zane's "Money Stretch", Aaliyah's "I Don't Wanna", Wyclef Jean's "Low Income", N.W.A.'s "Chin Check" and Toni Estes's "Hot".

== Track listing ==
No.	Title	Writer(s)	Producer(s)	Length
1.	"You Can Do It" (performed by Ice Cube, Mack 10 and Ms. Toi)	O'Shea Jackson; Dedrick Rolison; Donald Saunders	One Eye	4:20
2.	"Chin Check" (performed by N.W.A)	Jackson; Andre Young; Calvin Broadus; Lorenzo Patterson	Dr. Dre	4:24
3.	"We Murderers Baby" (performed by Vita and Ja Rule)	Jeffrey Atkins; Richard Wilson; Irving Lorenzo; Barry Eugene Carter	Dat Nigga Reb; Irv Gotti	3:55
4.	"Hot" (performed by Toni Estes)	Johntá Austin; Teddy Bishop	Teddy Bishop	3:12
5.	"Livin' It Up" (performed by Pharoahe Monch)	Troy Jamerson; Paul Hendricks	Baby Paul	2:53
6.	"Fried Day" (performed by Bizzy Bone and Sam Dates)	Byron McCane; Jimmy Thomas; Anthony Henderson; Charles Scruggs; Michael J. Powell; Steven Howse	Jimmy "JT" Thomas	4:37
7.	"I Don't Wanna" (performed by Aaliyah)	Austin; Kevin Hicks; Phalon Alexander; Donnie Scantz	Donnie Scantz	4:15
8.	"Low Income" (performed by Wyclef Jean)	Wyclef Jean; Jerry Duplessis	Jerry "Wonder" Duplessis; Wyclef Jean	4:14
9.	"Shaolin Worldwide" (performed by Wu-Tang Clan)	Clifford Smith; Jason Hunter; Patrick Charles; Ronald Bean; Dennis Coles; Robert Diggs	Allah Mathematics	4:05
10.	"Good Friday" (performed by Big Tymers, Lil' Wayne and Mack 10)	Bryan Williams; Byron Thomas; Dwayne Carter; Rolison	Mannie Fresh	3:53
11.	"Friday" (performed by Krayzie Bone and Lyric)	Henderson; Sarkis Balasanyan; Vachik Aghaniantz; James Harris III; Terry Lewis	Super Sako; Vachik Aghaniats	4:19
12.	"Mamacita" (performed by Frost, Kurupt, Soopafly and Don Cisco)	Arturo Molina; Ricardo Brown; Priest Brooks; Francisco Soto; Farid Nassar	Fredwreck	4:47
13.	"Make Your Body Sing" (performed by The Isley Brothers)	Ernie Isley; Ronald Isley; Angela Winbush	Angela Winbush; The Isley Brothers; Reggie Griffin (co.)	4:04
14.	"Murder, Murder" (performed by Eminem)	Marshall Mathers; Jeff Bass; Mark Bass	Bass Brothers	3:44
15.	"Money Stretch" (performed by Lil' Zane)	Zane Copeland; Dominick Warren; Kenneth Jones; Billy Beck; Clarence Satchell; James Williams; Marshall Jones; Marvin Pierce; Ralph Middlebrooks	Diggie Doms; Mistafiss	3:53
Total length:				1:00:47

Sample credits

- Track 1 contains a sample from "Planet Rock" as recorded by Afrika Bambaataa and the Soulsonic Force
- Track 3 contains samples from "Somebody Is Gonna Off the Man" as performed by Barry White
- Track 6 contains interpolations from "1st of tha Month"
- Track 9 contains excerpts from "Knuckleheadz" as performed by Raekwon
- Track 11 contains interpolations from "Saturday Love"
- Track 15 contains elements from "Glad to Know You're Mine" as performed by Ohio Players

=== Other songs ===
- The following songs did appear in the film but were not released on the soundtrack:
  - "Chase Me" written by Michael Vernon Cooper and Felton Pilate and performed by Con Funk Shun
  - "You Dropped a Bomb on Me" written by Lonnie Simmons, Rudy Taylor and Charlie Wilson and performed by The Gap Band
  - "Bad Luck" written by Victor Carstarphen, Gene McFadden and John Whitehead and performed by Harold Melvin & the Blue Notes
  - "Tell Me Something Good" written by Stevie Wonder and performed by Rufus & Chaka Khan
  - "Tyrone" written by Erykah Badu and Norman 'Keys' Hurt
  - "Juicy Fruit" written by James Mtume and performed by Mtume
  - "Rigor Mortis" written by Larry Blackmon, Arnett Leftenant and Nathan Leftenant and performed by Cameo
  - "In the Mood" written by Paul Richmond, Ruben Locke and Darryl Ellis and performed by Tyrone Davis
  - "Good Times" written by Dave Grusin, Alan and Marilyn Bergman
  - "Riding High" written by Keith D. Harrison, Tyrone Crum, Ralph E. Atkens, Roger Parker, Robert Neal Jr. and Clarence Satchell and performed by Faze-O
  - "Sex-O-Matic Venus Freak" written by Dion Murdock, Macy Gray and Jeremy Ruzumna and performed by Macy Gray
  - "Don't Stop the Feeling" written and performed by Roy Ayers
  - "Fame" written by David Bowie, John Lennon and Carlos Alomar and performed by David Bowie
  - "Let It Whip" written by Reggie Andrews and Leon Chancler and performed by Dazz Band
  - "Funky Worm" written by Marvin Pierce, Gregory A. Webster, Norman Napier, Ralph Middlebrooks, Leroy Bonner, Marshall E. Jones, Andrew Noland and Walter Morrison and performed by Ohio Players
  - "Jungle Fever" written by Bill Ador and performed by The Chakachas
  - "Can I Get A..." written by Jeffrey Atkins, Shawn Carter, Irving Lorenzo and Rob Mays
  - "Sinsemilla" written by Michael Rose and performed by Black Uhuru
  - "Friends" written by Jalil Hutchins and Lawrence Smith
  - "Movin' on Up (Theme from The Jeffersons)" written by Ja'Net DuBois and Jeff Barry

== Charts ==
=== Weekly charts ===
Chart (2000)	Peak position
US Billboard 200	19
US Top R&B/Hip-Hop Albums (Billboard)	5
Chart (2004)	Position
UK Soundtrack Albums (Official Charts)	43

=== Year-end charts ===
Chart (2000)	Position
US Billboard 200	109
US Top R&B/Hip-Hop Albums (Billboard)	34

== Certifications ==
Region	Certification	Certified units/sales
United States (RIAA)	Gold	500,000^{^}
^{^} Shipments figures based on certification alone.
