= Eazy-E discography =

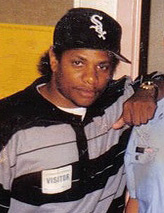
- Studio albums: 2
- Extended plays: 3
- Compilation albums: 4
- Singles: 10
- Music videos: 7

The discography of Eazy-E, an American rapper from Compton, California, consists of two studio albums, three extended plays, two compilation albums, and ten singles. Eazy was also featured on the single "Game Wreck-Oniz-Iz Game" by Above the Law and "Foe tha Love of $" by Bone Thugs-n-Harmony. His music has been released through record labels Ruthless Records, Priority Records, Relativity Records, and Epic Records. Five of his albums have been awarded a certification by the Recording Industry Association of America (RIAA). This discography includes music videos and collaborations as well as albums.

Eazy-E's music career started in 1986 with the hip hop group N.W.A, where he would perform on all four of the studio albums. In 1988, before Ice Cube left N.W.A, Eazy released Eazy-Duz-It as his first solo effort. Eazy-Duz-It peaked at number 41 on the Billboard 200 and became Eazy's most successful album, selling 2.5 million albums in the US by 1994. In 1992 it was certified double Platinum by the RIAA. The album's first single, "Eazy-er Said Than Dunn", would go on to peak at number 84 on the Hot R&B/Hip-Hop Songs. "Eazy-Duz-It" was released in 1989 and only charted on the Hot Dance Singles Sales chart. "We Want Eazy" was also released in 1989 and charted on both the Hot Rap Tracks chart and the Hot R&B/Hip-Hop Songs chart.

5150: Home 4 tha Sick was released on December 28, 1992, and peaked number 70 on the Billboard 200. The EP spawned two singles, "Only If You Want It" and "Merry Muthafuckin Xmas", which both failed to chart. It's On (Dr. Dre) 187um Killa, Eazy's second EP, was released on November 5, 1993. The album peaked at number five on the Billboard 200 and went 2 x multi platinum on February 7, 1994. That EP remains as the only Hip Hop EP to go Multiplatinum. It spawned two singles: "Real Muthaphuckkin G's" and "Any Last Werdz". "Real Muthaphuckkin G's" became Eazy's highest-charting single on the Billboard Hot 100, peaking at number 42. It also charted at number two on the Hot Rap Tracks and number 21 on the Hot Dance Singles Sales. The second single, "Any Last Werdz", failed to chart.

In 1994, "Luv 4 Dem Gangsta'z", originally featured on the Beverly Hills Cop III: Original Motion Picture Soundtrack, was released as a single. Released in 1995, Eternal E became Eazy's first compilation, peaking at number 84 on the Billboard 200. It was certified gold by the RIAA in 2003. Str8 off tha Streetz of Muthaphukkin Compton, Eazy's first and only posthumous studio album to date, was released in November 1995. The album became his best charting album on the Billboard 200, peaking at number three. Its main single "Just tah Let U Know" became one of Eazy's most successful singles, charting at number 45 on the Billboard Hot 100. On March 26, 2002, the seventh anniversary of Eazy-E’s death, Impact of a Legend was released and peaked number 113 on the Billboard 200. In 2007, Featuring...Eazy-E was released, and in 2010, a box set entitled Tri-Pack was released.

== Albums ==
=== Studio albums ===
List of studio albums, with selected chart positions and certifications
Title	Album details	Peak chart positions				Certifications
Title	Album details	US	US R&B	AUS	NZ	Certifications
Eazy-Duz-It	Released: November 22, 1988; Label: Ruthless, Priority; Format: CD, LP, CS	32	12	82	—	RIAA: 2× Platinum
Str8 off tha Streetz of Muthaphukkin Compton	Released: January 30, 1996; Label: Ruthless, Relativity; Format: CD, LP, CS	3	1	—	20	RIAA: Platinum
"—" denotes a release that did not chart.

=== Compilation albums ===
List of compilation albums, with selected chart positions and certifications
Title	Album details	Peak chart positions			Certifications
Title	Album details	US	US R&B	AUS	Certifications
Eternal E	Released: November 28, 1995; Label: Ruthless, Priority; Format: CD, LP, CS	84	19	71	RIAA: Gold
Featuring...Eazy-E	Released: December 4, 2007; Label: Priority; Formats: CD, LP, Digital download	—	—	—	
Tri-Pack	Released: 2010; Label: Ruthless; Formats: CD, LP, Digital download	—	—	—	
Merry Muthafuckin' X-Mas	Released: December 4, 2015; Label: Ruthless, Priority; Formats: Digital download	—	—	—	

== Extended plays ==
List of extended plays, with selected chart positions and certifications
Title	EP details	Peak chart positions		Certifications
Title	EP details	US	US R&B	Certifications
5150: Home 4 tha Sick	Released: December 15, 1992; Label: Ruthless, Priority; Formats: CD, LP, CS	70	15	RIAA: Gold
It's On (Dr. Dre) 187um Killa	Released: October 19, 1993; Label: Ruthless, Relativity; Formats: CD, LP, CS	5	1	RIAA: 2× Platinum
Impact of a Legend	Released: March 26, 2002; Label: Ruthless, Priority; Formats: CD, LP, CS	113	—	
"—" denotes a release that did not chart.

== Singles ==
=== As lead artist ===
List of singles as lead artist, with selected chart positions, showing year released and album name
Title	Year	Peak chart positions						Certifications	Album
Title	Year	US	US R&B/HH	US Rap	US Dance	AUS	NZ	Certifications	Album
"Boyz-n-the-Hood" (Note: Song did not appear on any chart until 2015.)	1987	50	18	14	—	69	—	RMNZ: Platinum	N.W.A. and the Posse
"Eazy-Duz-It"	1988	—	—	—	39	—	—		Eazy-Duz-It
"Eazy-er Said Than Dunn"	1988	—	84	—	—	—	—		Eazy-Duz-It
"We Want Eazy" (featuring Dr. Dre & MC Ren)	1989	—	43	7	—	—	—		Eazy-Duz-It
"Only If You Want It"	1992	—	—	—	—	—	—		5150: Home 4 tha Sick
"Merry Muthafuckin Xmas" (featuring Rudy Ray Moore, Menajahtwa, Atban Klann, and Buckwheat)	1992	—	—	—	—	—	—		5150: Home 4 tha Sick
"Real Muthaphuckkin G's" (featuring B.G. Knocc Out & Dresta)	1993	42	31	2	—	—	—	RMNZ: 2× Platinum	It's On (Dr. Dre) 187um Killa
"Any Last Werdz" (featuring Kokane and Cold 187 um)	1993	—	—	—	—	—	—		It's On (Dr. Dre) 187um Killa
"Luv 4 Dem Gangsta'z"	1994	103	54	26	—	—	—		Beverly Hills Cop III: Original Motion Picture Soundtrack
"Just tah Let U Know"	1995	45	30	4	—	—	20		Str8 off tha Streetz of Muthaphukkin Compton
"Tha Muthaphukkin Real" (featuring MC Ren)	1995	—	—	—	—	—	—		Str8 off tha Streetz of Muthaphukkin Compton
"Creep N Crawl"	1996	—	—	—	—	—	—		Str8 off tha Streetz of Muthaphukkin Compton
"Switchez" (featuring Roc Slanga)	2002	—	—	—	—	—	—		Impact of a Legend
"—" denotes a release that did not chart.

=== As featured artist ===
List of singles, with selected chart positions and certifications, showing year released and album name
Title	Year	Peak chart positions				Certifications	Album
Title	Year	US	US R&B	US Rap	US Dance	Certifications	Album
"The Grand Finalé" (The D.O.C. featuring Ice Cube, MC Ren, Dr. Dre and Eazy-E)	1989	—	—	—	—		No One Can Do It Better
"Anything You Want" (Tairrie B featuring Eazy-E)	1990	—	—	—	—		Power of a Woman
"Trust No Bitch" (Penthouse Players Clique featuring DJ Quik, AMG and Eazy-E)	1992	—	—	—	—		Paid the Cost
"Game Wreck-Oniz-Iz Game" (Above the Law featuring Eazy-E and Kokane)	1993	—	—	—	—		Black Mafia Life
"Niggaz And Jewz (Some Say Kikes)" (Blood of Abraham featuring Eazy-E & Will 1 X)	1993	—	—	—	—		Future Profits
"Back 2 Da OG" (Menajahtwa featuring Eazy-E)	1994	—	—	—	—		Cha-licious
"Foe tha Love of $" (Bone Thugs-n-Harmony featuring Eazy-E)	1995	41	37	4	28	RMNZ: Gold	Creepin on ah Come Up
"Black Nigga Killa" (Eazy-E)	1998	—	—	—	—		Ruthless Records Tenth Anniversary: Decade of Game
"24 Hours To Live" (Eazy-E)	1998	—	—	—	—		Ruthless Records Tenth Anniversary: Decade of Game
"B.N.K. (Bone Thugs Remix)" (Bone Thugs-N-Harmony featuring Eazy-E)	1998	—	—	—	—		The Collection : Volume 1
"Eastside Drama" (Brownside featuring Eazy-E)	1999	—	—	—	—		Payback
"Sleepwalkers" (Bone Thugs-n-Harmony featuring Eazy-E)	2000	—	—	—	—		The Collection : Volume 2
"So Sweet" (Erick Sermon featuring Eazy-E)	2000	—	—	—	—		Def Squad Presents : Erick Onasis
"Gangstas" (Boyz N Da Hood featuring Eazy-E)	2005	—	—	—	—		Boyz N Da Hood
"Ride" (Mo Thugs featuring Layzie Bone and Eazy-E)	2023	—	—	—	—		ThugLine Vs MoThugs
"—" denotes a release that did not chart.

== Music videos ==
List of music videos, showing year released and director(s)
Title	Year	Director(s)
"Eazy-er Said Than Dunn"	1988	John Lloyd Miller
"We Want Eazy"	1989	J. Kevin Swain
"Only If You Want It"	1992	Mark Gerard
"Neighborhood Sniper"	1992	Unknown
"Real Muthaphuckkin G's"	1993	Marty Thomas
"Any Last Werdz"	1994	Edward Louderback
"Just tah Let U Know"	1996	Unknown

== See also ==
- N.W.A discography
