= Featuring... Eazy-E =

2007 compilation album by Eazy-E

Compilation album by Eazy-E
- Released: December 4, 2007
- Recorded: 1987–1998
- Genres: West Coast hip hop; gangsta rap; G-funk
- Length: 68:25
- Label: Priority Records
- Producer: Frank Collura

Eazy-E chronology
Impact of a Legend (2002)	Featuring... Eazy-E (2007)	Eazy-E Tri-Pack (2010)

Featuring... Eazy-E is a compilation of songs by American rapper Eazy-E

Professional ratings
Review scores
Source	Rating
Allmusic	3/5 stars
PopMatters	5/10 stars

The track list includes songs which were featured on N.W.A. albums, as well as from other rappers such as Penthouse Players Clique, Mack 10 and Bone Thugs-n-Harmony, and from his own solo albums. It also includes two tracks from the Ruthless Records Tenth Anniversary: Decade of Game compilation album. It was released for digital download with similar cover art and a similar track list by Priority Records on December 4, 2007, with the title Starring... Eazy-E. Track numbers 7, 9, 11 and 12 weren't on the first digital release. The album is notable for being the first time the single Luv 4 Dem Gangsta'z was put onto an Eazy-E record. It became the first Eazy-E project to not chart on the Billboard 200 or anywhere for that matter. This trend would continue for the compilation album "Eazy-E Tri-Pack" which featured songs from Eazy's previous three projects.

== Track listing ==
No.	Title	Writer(s)	Producer(s)	Length
1.	"Luv 4 Dem Gangsta'z" (from Beverly Hills Cop III)	K. Carter; H. Milling; E. Wright	Dr. Jam	4:34
2.	"2 Hard Muthas (featuring M.C. Ren)" (from Eazy-Duz-It)	L. Patterson; A. Young; A. Carraby; E. Wright	Dr. Dre; DJ Yella	4:25
3.	"Trust No Bitch (featuring Playa Hamm, AMG, Tweed Cadillac & DJ Quik)" (from Paid the Cost)	W. B. Milo; D. Blake; J. Lewis; E. Wright	DJ Quik	5:02
4.	"L.A. Is The Place (featuring Ron-De-Vu)" (from N.W.A. and the Posse)	O. Jackson	Dr. Dre	4:34
5.	"Findum, Fuckum & Flee (featuring M.C. Ren, Dr. Dre & CPO)" (from Niggaz4Life)	L. Patterson; T. Curry; E. Wright	Dr. Dre; DJ Yella	3:56
6.	"Get Yo Ride On (featuring Mack 10 & MC Eiht)" (from The Recipe)	D. Rolison; A. Tyler; Rhythm D; D. Weldon; S. Wade; E. Wright	Rhythm D; Slice	3:30
7.	"Black Nigga Killa" (from Ruthless Records Tenth Anniversary: Decade of Game)	E. Wright	L.T. Hutton	4:48
8.	"We Want Eazy (12" Remix)"	T. Curry; L. Patterson	Dr. Dre; DJ Yella	6:39
9.	"Foe tha Love of $ (featuring Bone Thugs-n-Harmony" (from Creepin on ah Come Up)	A. Carraby; M. E. Green; A. Henderson; S. Howse; S. Howse; B. McCane; C. Scruggs; Y. Smith; E. Wright	DJ Yella; Eazy-E	4:11
10.	"I'd Rather Fuck You" (from Niggaz4Life)	E. Wright	Dr. Dre; DJ Yella	3:58
11.	"24 Hours to Live" (from Ruthless Records Tenth Anniversary: Decade of Game)	E. Wright	L.T. Hutton	4:43
12.	"Boyz-n-the-Hood G-Mix (Featuring Dresta)" (from "It's On (Dr. Dre) 187um Killa")	O. Jackson; E. Wright; H. Milling	Dr. Jam	5:39
13.	"Fat Girl (featuring Ron-De-Vu)" (from N.W.A. and the Posse)	O. Jackson	Dr. Dre	2:49
14.	"Automobile (featuring Dr. Dre)" (from Niggaz4Life)	E. Wright	Dr. Dre	3:16
15.	"P.S. Phuk U 2 (featuring Penthouse Players Clique & DJ Quik)" (from Paid the Cost)	W. B. Milo; D. Blake; E. Wright	DJ Quik	3:24
16.	"Ruthless Villain (featuring M.C. Ren)" (from Eazy-Duz-It)	L. Patterson	Dr. Dre; DJ Yella	2:57
