= Eternal E =

1995 greatest hits album by Eazy-E

- Standard artwork

Greatest hits album by Eazy-E
- Released: November 28, 1995
- Recorded: 1986–1995
- Genres: West Coast hip hop; gangsta rap; G-funk
- Length: 60:56
- Labels: Ruthless; Priority
- Producers: Cold 187um; DJ Bobcat; DJ Yella; Dr. Dre; Eazy-E; Naughty by Nature

Eazy-E chronology
It's On (~~Dr. Dre~~) 187^{um} Killa (1993)	Eternal E (1995)	Str8 off tha Streetz of Muthaphukkin Compton (1996)

Eternal E is the first greatest hits album by American rapper Eazy-E. It was released posthumously on November 28, 1995, through Ruthless/Priority Records, eight months after his death. Production was handled by DJ Yella, Dr. Dre, DJ Bobcat, Cold 187um, Naughty by Nature, and Eazy-E himself, who also served as executive producer. The album peaked at number 84 on the Billboard 200 and number 19 on the Top R&B/Hip-Hop Albums chart in the United States. It was certified Gold by the Recording Industry Association of America on February 21, 2003, for selling over 500,000 copies in the U.S.

== Critical reception ==
Professional ratings
Review scores
Source	Rating
AllMusic	4/5 stars
Entertainment Weekly	B+
Muzik	2.5/5 stars
NME	6/10
RapReviews	5/10
Sputnikmusic	4/5
The New Rolling Stone Album Guide	3/5 stars

- Entertainment Weekly (12/1/95, p. 77) – "...hits like the groundbreaking 'Boyz-N-the-Hood' and the funky 'We Want Eazy' are enjoyably raw (and music history to boot)." – Rating: B+
- Melody Maker (1/13/96, p. 29) – Recommended – "...those old pre-Compton solo tracks...are still the absolute f***ing bomb, even with, in fact, because of, the dated production....[His] was the first voice in hip hop that could be called weak...and thus it was petulantly aggressive in a way that was entirely new."
- Rap Pages (2/96, p. 31) – 9 (out of 10) – "...a historical biography of Eazy-E's music that is a must-have for the archives...this compilation documents the life of one of West Coast rap's most important contributors."
- NME (1/6/96, p. 33) – 7 (out of 10) – "...is as elegiac as it is capitalistic....[These are] graphic accounts and celebrations of streetlife designed to cause maximum offence to anyone who doesn't try to understand the social context..."

== Track listing ==
Eternal E
No.	Title	Writer(s)	Producer(s)	Length
1.	"Boyz-n-the-Hood (Remix)"	Eric Wright; O'Shea Jackson; Andre Young	Dr. Dre; DJ Yella	6:21
2.	"8 Ball"	Jackson; Young	Dr. Dre; DJ Yella	4:51
3.	"Eazy-Duz-It"	Wright; Lorenzo Patterson; Young	Dr. Dre; DJ Yella	4:19
4.	"Eazy-er Said Than Dunn"	Young; Bonny Rice; Eddie Floyd; Rufus Thomas	Dr. Dre; DJ Yella	3:40
5.	"No More ?'s"	Jackson	Dr. Dre; DJ Yella	3:54
6.	"We Want Eazy"	Wright; William Collins	Dr. Dre; DJ Yella	5:00
7.	"Nobody Move"	Patterson; Young	Dr. Dre; DJ Yella	4:47
8.	"Radio"	Patterson; Young	Dr. Dre; DJ Yella	4:57
9.	"Only If You Want It"	Anthony Criss; Kier Gist; Vinnie Brown	Naughty by Nature	3:02
10.	"Neighborhood Sniper"	Gregory Hutchinson; Jerry Long; Zig Zag; Mike Smooth	Cold 187um	5:11
11.	"I'd Rather Fuck You"	Collins; Gary Cooper; George Clinton, Jr.	Dr. Dre; DJ Yella	3:57
12.	"Automobile"	Clinton, Jr.; Clarence Haskins	Dr. Dre; DJ Yella	3:16
13.	"Niggaz My Height Don't Fight"	Bobby Ervin; Corey Lloyd Brown; Charles Singleton	DJ Bobcat	3:14
14.	"Eazy Street"	Wright; Young	Eazy-E; Dr. Dre	4:27
Total length:				1:00:56

Eternal E • Best Of (2003 reissue bonus tracks)
No.	Title	Writer(s)	Producer(s)	Length
15.	"Real Muthaphuckkin G's" (featuring B.G. Knocc Out & Dresta)	Wright; Arlandis Hinton; Andre Wicker; David Weldon	Rhythm D	5:32
16.	"Ole School Shit" (featuring B.G. Knocc Out, Dresta & Sylk-E. Fyne)	Wright; Hinton; Wicker; La'Mar Johnson; Antoine Carraby; Weldon	DJ Yella	4:01

Eternal E: Gangsta Memorial Edition (2005 reissue bonus track)
No.	Title	Writer(s)	Producer(s)	Length
17.	"A Lil' Eazier Said" (performed by Lil Eazy-E)	Eric Wright, Jr.	DaRaskulls	3:40

Eternal E: Gangsta Memorial Edition (2005 reissue bonus DVD)
No.	Title	Writer(s)	Length
18.	"We Want Eazy"	Wright; Tracy Curry; Collins; Clinton, Jr.; Maceo Parker
19.	"Eazy-er Said Than Dunn"	Young; Rice; Floyd; Thomas
20.	"Straight Outta Compton (Street Version)"	Jackson; Patterson; Wright; Young
21.	"100 Miles and Runnin'"	Patterson; Wright; Young; Curry; Hutchinson; Holland–Dozier–Holland; Herbie Hancock; Paul Jackson; Melvin Ragin
22.	"Appetite for Destruction (Extended Street Version)"	Curry; Young; Patterson; Long
23.	"Only If You Want It (Street Version)"	Criss; Gist; Brown
24.	"Real Compton City G's"	Wright; Hinton; Wicker; Weldon
25.	"Neighborhood Sniper (Street Version)"	Hutchinson; Long; Bell; Turner
26.	"Just tah Let U Know"	Wright; Angelo Trotter; Reginald Pace; Edwards
27.	"Public Service Announcement 1" (performed by the Kaiser Family Foundation)
28.	"Public Service Announcement 2" (performed by the Kaiser Family Foundation)
29.	"Public Service Announcement 3" (performed by the Kaiser Family Foundation)

Notes

- Tracks 1, 3, 4, 5, 6, 7 and 8 are taken from Eazy-E's album Eazy-Duz-It ℗ 1998 Ruthless/Priority Records
- Track 2 is taken from N.W.A's album Straight Outta Compton ℗ 1988 Ruthless/Priority
- Tracks 9, 10 and 13 are taken from Eazy-E's EP 5150: Home 4 tha Sick ℗ 1992 Ruthless/Priority
- Tracks 11 and 12 are taken from N.W.A's album Efil4zaggin ℗ 1991 Ruthless/Priority
- Track 14 is taken from The Return of Superfly (Original Motion Picture Soundtrack) ℗ 1990 Capitol Records
- Track 15 is taken from Eazy-E's EP It's On (~~Dr. Dre~~) 187^{um} Killa ℗ 1994 Ruthless Records
- Track 16 is taken from Eazy-E's album Str8 off tha Streetz of Muthaphukkin Compton ℗ 1994 Ruthless Records

== Charts ==
Chart performance for Eternal E
Chart (1995)	Peak position
US Billboard 200	84
US Top R&B/Hip-Hop Albums (Billboard)	19

Chart performance for Eternal E-The Best Of Eazy-E: Gangsta Memorial Edition
Chart (2005)	Peak position
US Top Rap Albums (Billboard)	17
US Top Catalog Albums (Billboard)	2

Chart performance for Eternal E
Chart (2015)	Peak position
Australian Albums (ARIA)	71

== Certifications ==
Region	Certification	Certified units/sales
United States (RIAA)	Gold	500,000^{^}
^{^} Shipments figures based on certification alone.
