= Luv 4 Dem Gangsta'z =

1994 single by Eazy-E featuring Slash & Dirty Red

Single by Eazy-E featuring Slash

from the album Beverly Hills Cop III
- Released: May 10, 1994
- Recorded: 1994
- Genre: Gangsta rap; G-funk
- Length: 4:34
- Label: MCA
- Songwriters: Eazy-E, Ruthless Dirty Red, Doctor Jam
- Producers: Doctor Jam, Eazy-E

Eazy-E singles chronology
"Any Last Werdz" (1994)	"Luv 4 Dem Gangsta'z" (1994)	"Foe tha Love of $" (1994)

"Luv 4 Dem Gangsta'z", also known as "Luv 4 Dem G'z", is a 1994 single by Eazy-E from the Beverly Hills Cop III soundtrack. It became the final solo single released by Eazy-E prior to his death the following year. It was later included on Eazy-E's posthumous compilation, Featuring…Eazy-E (2007).

== History ==
The song was released in 1994 and was written by Eazy-E, Kevyn "Ruthless Dirty Red" Carter, and Doctor Jam. It was produced by Doctor Jam and Eazy-E. The guitar solo was performed by Slash and the hook was sung by Ruthless Dirty Red, though he was left uncredited on the song. "Luv 4 Dem Gangsta'z" is notable for being the only single by Eazy-E to not be released for his label, Ruthless Records, as it was released for MCA Records. "Luv 4 Dem Gangsta'z" peaked at No. 1 on the Bubbling Under R&B/Hip-Hop Singles chart and No. 3 on the Bubbling Under Hot 100 Singles chart.

Due to the aforementioned differences in labels, "Luv 4 Dem Gangsta'z" initially did not appear on any of Eazy-E's solo releases, such as the 1995 compilation Eternal E or 1996 studio album Str8 off tha Streetz of Muthaphukkin Compton. The song eventually appeared, however, on the 2007 compilation Featuring…Eazy-E.

The song is commonly used in Eazy-E remixes which started in the late 2000s. The song was covered by the Insane Clown Posse with affiliate Cold 187um on The Mighty Death Pop!'s bonus album Smothered, Covered & Chunked. It was later sampled in 2014 by Sander Van Doorn and Firebeatz for their song "Guitar Track".

== Track listing ==
1. "Luv 4 Dem Gangsta'z" (Original Clean)- 4:34
2. "Luv 4 Dem Gangsta'z" (Funky Clean)- 4:35
3. "Luv 4 Dem Gangsta'z" (Clean Chorus Re-Edit)- 4:34
4. "Luv 4 Dem Gangsta'z" (Instrumental)- 4:28

== Charts ==
Year	Chart	Position
1994	Hot Rap Singles (Billboard)	26
1994	Hot R&B/Hip-Hop Singles Sales (Billboard)	54
1994	Hot Dance Music/Maxi-Singles Sales (Billboard)	21
1994	Bubbling Under R&B/Hip-Hop Singles (Billboard)	1
1994	Bubbling Under Hot 100 Singles (Billboard)	3
1994	UK Singles Chart (OCC)	63
