= Ruthless Records Tenth Anniversary: Decade of Game =

Decade of Game

Compilation album by Various artists
- Released: March 24, 1998
- Recorded: 1988–1998
- Genre: West Coast hip hop
- Label: Ruthless/Epic/Sony
- Producers: Eazy-E (exec.); Dr. Dre; DJ Yella; Above The Law; L.T. Hutton; Laylaw; Arabian Prince; DJ Bobcat; Dr. Jam; Rhythm D; Tony G; Tootie; Chocolate

Professional ratings
Review scores
Source	Rating
AllMusic	3/5 stars

Ruthless Records Tenth Anniversary: Decade of Game is a compilation album released by Ruthless Records. The album featured some of the label's greatest hits from the previous ten years. It peaked at 119 on the Billboard 200 and 44 on the Top R&B/Hip-Hop Albums. This compilation album is also notable for featuring some unreleased songs from Eazy-E.

== Track listing ==
=== Disc 1 ===
1. "Intro" – 0:40
2. "24 Hours to Live" – 4:42 (Eazy-E)
3. "Dopeman" – 5:37 (N.W.A)
4. "Untouchable" – 3:39 (Above the Law)
5. "Same Ol' Shit" – 4:05 (MC Ren)
6. "Great Tazte-Less Fillaz" – 4:32 (H.W.A.)
7. "It's Funky Enough" – 4:28 (The D.O.C.)
8. "Alwayz into Somethin'" – 4:29 (N.W.A)
9. "Fuck What Ya Heard" – 4:08 (MC Ren)
10. "I Ain't No Lady" – 3:35 (H.W.A.)
11. "Murder Rap" – 4:55 (Above the Law)
12. "Real Muthaphuckkin G's" – 5:24 (Eazy-E)

=== Disc 2 ===
1. "Black Nigga Killa" – 4:47 (Eazy-E)
2. "8 Ball" – 4:48 (N.W.A)
3. "Final Frontier" – 4:11 (MC Ren)
4. "The Formula" – 4:10 (The D.O.C.)
5. "Black Superman" – 4:26 (Above the Law)
6. "Supersonic" – 3:55 (J.J. Fad)
7. "Boyz-n-the-Hood (Remix)" – 6:40 (Eazy-E)
8. "Something in My Heart" – 5:48 (Michel'le)
9. "Nicety" – 3:23 (Michel'le)
10. "The Grand Finale" – 4:38 (The D.O.C & N.W.A)
11. "Outro" – 1:16

== Chart history ==
Chart (1998)	Peak position
US Billboard 200	119
US Top R&B/Hip-Hop Albums (Billboard)	44
