= Only If You Want It =

Single by Eazy-E

from the album 5150: Home 4 tha Sick
- B-side: "Neighborhood Sniper"
- Released: October 12, 1992
- Recorded: 1992
- Studio: Audio Achievements (Torrance, California)
- Genre: West Coast hip hop
- Length: 3:03
- Label: Ruthless; Priority
- Songwriters: Anthony Criss; Vincent Brown; Keir Gist
- Producer: Naughty by Nature

Eazy-E singles chronology
"We Want Eazy" (1989)	"Only If You Want It" (1992)	"Neighborhood Sniper" (1992)

Music video
- "Only If You Want It" on YouTube

"Only If You Want It" is a song by Eazy-E. It is the first single released from the EP 5150: Home 4 tha Sick. For "Only If You Want It" Eazy collaborated with rap group Naughty by Nature .

The single was sold in a cd which included the EP's second single "Neighborhood Sniper", which featured Kokane and was produced and written by Eazy-E, Cold 187um. Both "Only If You Want It" and "Neighborhood Sniper" had promotional music videos released, but the singles did not make it to any charts. Both "Only If You Want It" and "Neighborhood Sniper" featured on Eazy-E's 1995 greatest hits album Eternal E

== Track listing ==
=== A-side ===
1. "Only If You Want It" (Clean Mix)- 3:00
2. "Only If You Want It" (Instrumental)- 3:00

=== B-side ===
1. "Neighborhood Sniper" (Cold 187 um Street Uncensored Mix)- 5:12
2. "Neighborhood Sniper" (Instrumental)- 5:12
