= Eazy-er Said Than Dunn =

Single by Eazy-E

from the album Eazy-Duz-It
- B-side: "We Want Eazy"
- Released: 1989
- Recorded: 1988
- Studio: Audio Achievements (Torrance, California)
- Genre: Hip hop
- Length: 3:41
- Label: Ruthless; Priority
- Songwriter(s): Eddie Floyd; Bonny Rice; Rufus Thomas; Andre Romelle Young
- Producer(s): Dr. Dre; DJ Yella

Eazy-E singles chronology
"Eazy-Duz-It" (1989)	"Eazy-er Said Than Dunn" (1989)	"We Want Eazy" (1989)

"Eazy-er Said Than Dunn" is a song by American rapper Eazy-E. The song was released as the second single from his debut studio album, Eazy-Duz-It. The track was produced by Dr. Dre and DJ Yella.

== Music video ==
The video shows N.W.A at a club playing the single to the crowd and wandering through Compton, California. The official music video was directed by John Lloyd Miller. According to Miller, Jay Roach was one of the cameramen for the video. Also on set, but not appearing in the video was future rapper Snoop Dogg.

== Cover art ==
The front and back cover images of Eazy-er Said Than Dunn were made by photographer Ithaka Darin Pappas on November 11, 1988, at Ithaka's own apartment in the Miracle Mile neighborhood of Los Angeles. This was the same photography session that the official press photographs for the N.W.A album Straight Outta Compton were made.

== Covers ==
DJ Quik covered the song under the title "Quikker Said Than Dunn" on his 2000 album, Balance & Options.

== Charts ==
Chart (1989)	Peak position
US Hot R&B/Hip-Hop Songs (Billboard)	84
