= Tuffest Man Alive =

EP by The Fila Fresh Crew
- Released: 1988
- Recorded: 1988
- Genre: Hip hop
- Label: Macola Records
- Producer: Dr. Dre; Dr. Rock; Rickie Rich

The Fila Fresh Crew chronology
N.W.A. and the Posse (1987)	Tuffest Man Alive (1988)

Tuffest Man Alive is the debut extended play by the Dallas rap-group Fila Fresh Crew. Released in 1988 on Macola Records, the EP spawned three singles and a music video.

== Background ==
The album was produced primarily by Dr. Rock, with production from Dr. Dre on three tracks. The songs "Dunk the Funk", "Tuffest Man Alive", "3 The Hard Way" and "Drink It Up" were previously released on the compilation album N.W.A. and the Posse and were also released as the "Dunk the Funk" single. "I Wanna Know What Love Is" was first released as a b-side to the "Fear of the Rap" single and is included as a bonus track on the 2017 reissue of Tuffest Man Alive.

== Track listing ==
1. "Dunk the Funk"
2. "Truth"
3. "Tuffest Man Alive"
4. "Nasty"
5. "I Hate to Go to Work"
6. "Fear of the Rap"
7. "3 the Hard Way"
8. "Drink It Up"

Bonus track (2017 reissue)
No.	Title	Length
1.	""I Wanna Know What Love Is""

== Singles ==
Single information
"I Hate To Go To Work"
- Released: 1988
- B-side: "I Hate To Go To Work" (instrumental)
"Dunk the Funk"
- Released: 1988
- B-sides: "Drink It Up" · "3 The Hard Way" · "Tuffest Man Alive"
"Fear of the Rap"
- Released: 1989
- B-sides: "I Wanna Know What Love Is" · "Ain't Gonna Hurt Nobody"
