= Str8 off tha Streetz of Muthaphukkin Compton =

1996 studio album by Eazy-E

Studio album by Eazy-E
- Released: January 30, 1996
- Recorded: 1992–1995
- Studio: Audio Achievements (Torrance, California)
- Genres: West Coast hip hop; gangsta rap; G-funk; horrorcore
- Length: 53:45
- Labels: Ruthless; Relativity
- Producers: Eazy-E (also exec); DJ Yella; Naughty by Nature; Bobcat; Tony G; Stone Tha Lunatic; Roger Troutman

Eazy-E chronology
Eternal E (1995)	Str8 off tha Streetz of Muthaphukkin Compton (1996)	Impact of a Legend (2002)

Singles from Str8 off tha Streetz of Muthaphukkin Compton
- 1. "Just tah Let U Know" Released: December 5, 1995; 2. "Sippin' on a 40" Released: January 30, 1996; 3. "Tha Muthaphukkin Real'" Released: January 30, 1996; 4. "Creep n Crawl" Released: January 30, 1996

Str8 off tha Streetz of Muthaphukkin Compton is the second and final studio album by American rapper Eazy-E. It was released posthumously by Ruthless Records and Relativity Records on January 30, 1996, ten months after Eazy-E's death in March 1995. The album spawned the singles "Just tah Let U Know", "Sippin' on a 40" which featured B.G. Knocc Out and Dresta, "Tha Muthaphukkin' Real" which featured MC Ren, and "Creep n Crawl".

== Album information ==
Released posthumously after Wright's 1995 death from AIDS, Str8 off tha Streetz of Muthaphukkin Compton was, according to Gerrick D. Kennedy in his book Parental Discretion Is Advised: The Rise of N.W.A and the Dawn of Gangsta Rap, "... completed with Yella's assistance. The album was unfinished at the time of Wright's death, and was cobbled together using leftover records and scraps of songs he had yet to complete for his ... "double album titled Temporary Insanity. The album was initially going to be released in the summer under the name Temporary Insanity, containing up to 60 songs, before his death. These songs were mostly the same as the scheduled 1993 release and also included more songs included a collaboration with Guns n' Roses, however the master tapes of the most went missing from Eazy-E's car the day he was admitted to the hospital, but were reportedly recovered and now are in the hands of Dr. Dre.

Some tracks on the album were also from the abandoned compilation album called the Ruthless Family Compilation, the tracks were Sippin On a 40, Ole School Shit and Gangsta Beat 4 Tha Street.

== Str8 off tha Streetz of Muthaphukkin Compton ==
When Eazy-E died in March 1995, he was working on an album called Str8 Off Tha Streetz of Muthaphukkin Compton vol. 1 & vol. 2 which the recordings were stolen from his car while he was in the hospital and is confirmed to be somewhere in Canada. It featured 60-70 songs and was going to be the largest double-album release but sadly never was. Since the original project was stolen, DJ Yella stepped in as the primary architect to cobble together tracks from fragments and scraps left over from the abandoned “Temporary Insanity” sessions which included 6 tracks.

== Temporary Insanity ==
Temporary Insanity is an album that was recorded by Eazy-E but was never released. The album was intended to be the follow-up to his 1988 album Eazy-Duz-It and was initially planned for released on May 11, 1993. Bobcat is believed to be one of the producers of the album. The album featured a guest appearance by Guns N' Roses; their track is believed to be titled "Apocalypse" but this has never been confirmed. Temporary Insanity would have been the first solo double album in the gangsta rap genre.

In 1990 Eazy-E began working on the N.W.A. album Niggaz4Life and started planning his second solo album. Recording for the album began in early 1991. Dr. Dre was the main producer for the album but departed from Ruthless Records in early 1992; this changed the production of Temporary Insanity with different producers becoming involved. Eazy recorded between 30 and 60 songs for the album. The EP 5150: Home 4 Tha Sick was recorded at the same time and served as the precursor and introduction to the album. During the mastering and mixing process, Bryan Turner, head of Priority Records, received a tape copy of the album and said publicly that it was one of the best albums he had ever heard. The album became less tenable when Dr. Dre released his album The Chronic in December 1992, popularizing the G-funk sound while taking shots at Eazy-E. This caused Eazy-E to decided against releasing Temporary Insanity and the recordings were abandoned.

Several tracks that eventually appeared on Str8 off tha Streetz of Muthaphukkin Compton were originally planned for Temporary Insanity and were repurposed. These include "First Power," "Lickin Suckin Phukkin," "Hit the Hooker," "Sorry Louie," "My Babyz Mama," and "Nutz on Ya Chin."

== Critical reception ==
Professional ratings
Review scores
Source	Rating
AllMusic	2.5/5 stars
Entertainment Weekly	B
The Guardian	1/5 stars
Los Angeles Times	2/4 stars
Muzik	1/5 stars
The Source	3.5/5 stars

Entertainment Weekly's David Browne viewed it as Eazy-E's "most musically varied and enjoyable album" where "he leaves our consciousness the same way he entered — rough, raunchy, embattled, and utterly unapologetic."

Stephen Thomas Erlewine noted "... Eazy-E sounds revitalized, but the music simply isn't imaginative. Instead of pushing forward and creating a distinctive style, it treads over familiar gangsta territory, complete with bottomless bass, whining synthesizers, and meaningless boasts."

== Commercial performance ==
Str8 Off tha Streetz of Muthaphukkin Compton debuted and peaked at #3 on the Billboard 200 and #1 on the Top R&B/Hip-Hop Albums chart. The album was certified gold on May 20, 1996, selling over 500,000 copies. The album went certified platinum soon after.

== Track listing ==
No.	Title	Writer(s)	Producer(s)	Length
1.	"First Power"	A. Carraby; E. Wright; M. Rucker	DJ Yella	0:46
2.	"Ole School Shit" (featuring Dresta, B.G. Knocc Out & Sylk-E. Fyne)	A. Wicker; A. Carraby; A. Hinton; D. Weldon; E. Wright; L. Johnson	DJ Yella	4:01
3.	"Sorry Louie"	E. Wright	Bobcat; Eazy-E	4:04
4.	"Just tah Let U Know"	E. Wright	Eazy-E	4:09
5.	"Sippin' on a 40" (featuring B.G. Knocc Out & Dresta)	A. Wicker; A. Carraby; A. Hinton; M. Dickerson; C. Miller; E. Wright; H. Brown; L. Oskar; L. Jordan; S. Allen	DJ Yella	4:30
6.	"Nutz on Ya Chin"	E. Wright; A. Criss; K. Gist	Naughty By Nature	3:08
7.	"Tha Muthaphukkin' Real" (featuring MC Ren)	A. Carraby; E. Wright; L. Patterson	DJ Yella; MC Ren (co.)	4:21
8.	"Lickin, Suckin, Phukkin"	A. Carraby; E. Wright; J. Tovio	DJ Yella	2:24
9.	"Hit the Hooker"	E. Wright; L. Patterson	Naughty by Nature	2:52
10.	"My Baby'z Mama"	C. Lloyd	Bobcat	3:44
11.	"Creep n Crawl"	A. Carraby; E. Wright	DJ Yella	4:11
12.	"Wut Would You Do" (featuring Dirty Red)	J. Gonzales; K. Carter; T. Gonzales	Tony G	5:52
13.	"Gangsta Beat 4 tha Street" (featuring Dresta, B.G. Knocc Out & Menajahtwa)	A. Carraby; A. Wicker; A. Hinton; E. Wright; M. Fields; T. Hudson	DJ Yella	3:40
14.	"Eternal E" (featuring Roger Troutman)	E. Wright; J. Gonzales; R. Troutman; T. Gonzales	Eazy-E; Roger Troutman; DJ Yella	5:26
Total length:				53:45

== Personnel ==
- Thomas Sylvester Allen – songwriter & percussion (track 5)
- Harold Ray Brown – songwriter & drums (track 5)
- Antoine Carraby – songwriter & producer (tracks 1–2, 5, 7–8, 11, 13), co-producer (track 14)
- Kevyn "Shaki" Carter – production coordinator, featured artist & songwriter (track 12)
- Giulio Costanzo – illustrator, design
- Anthony Shawn Criss – songwriter & producer (tracks 6, 9)
- Donald Cunningham – art director, design
- Morris Dewayne Dickerson – songwriter & bass (track 5)
- Peter Dokus – cover photography
- Bobby "Bobcat" Ervin – producer & songwriter (tracks 3, 10)
- Makeba Fields – featured artist & songwriter (track 13)
- Brian Knapp Gardner – mastering
- Keir Lamont Gist – songwriter & producer (tracks 6, 9)
- Julio Gonzales – songwriter (tracks 12, 14)
- Tony Gonzalez – songwriter & producer (tracks 12, 14)
- Arlandis Hinton – featured artist & songwriter (tracks 2, 5, 13)
- Tanesha L. Hudson – featured artist & songwriter (track 13)
- La'Mar Lorraine Johnson – featured artist & songwriter (track 2)
- Leroy "Lonnie" Jordan – songwriter & keyboards (track 5)
- Lee Oskar Levitin – songwriter & harmonica (track 5)
- C. Lloyd – songwriter (tracks 3, 10)
- Charles W. Miller – songwriter & saxophone (track 5)
- Reginald "Big Reg" Pace – songwriter (track 4)
- Lorenzo Jerald Patterson – featured artist, songwriter & co-producer (track 7)
- Mark "Big Man" Rucker – songwriter (track 1)
- Mike "Crazy Neck" Sims – bass & guitar (tracks 1–2, 5, 7–8, 11, 13)
- Donovan "Tha Dirt Biker" Sound – recording & mixing
- John Tovio – songwriter (track 8)
- Angelo Trotter IV – songwriter & producer (track 4)
- Roger Troutman – featured artist, songwriter & producer (track 14)
- David "Rhythm D" Weldon – songwriter (track 2)
- Andre Wicker – featured artist & songwriter (tracks 2, 5, 13)
- Eric "Eazy E" Wright – main artist, executive producer, songwriter (tracks 1–2, 4–8, 11, 13–14)

== Charts ==
=== Weekly charts ===
Chart (1996)	Peak position
Canada Top Albums/CDs (RPM)	23
New Zealand Albums (RMNZ)	20
UK Albums (Official Charts)	66
US Billboard 200	3
US Top R&B/Hip-Hop Albums (Billboard)	1

=== Year-end charts ===
Chart (1996)	Position
US Billboard 200	163
US Top R&B/Hip-Hop Albums (Billboard)	57

== Certifications ==
Region	Certification	Certified units/sales
United States (RIAA)	Platinum	1,000,000

== Temporary Insanity ==
Temporary Insanity is an album that was recorded by Eazy-E but was never released. The album was intended to be the follow-up to his 1988 album Eazy-Duz-It and was initially planned for released on May 11, 1993. The album featured a guest appearance by Guns N' Roses; their track is believed to be titled "Apocalypse" but this has never been confirmed. Temporary Insanity would have been the first solo double album in the gangsta rap genre.

In 1990 Eazy-E began working on the N.W.A. album Niggaz4Life and started planning his second solo album. Recording for the album began in early 1991. Dr. Dre was the main producer for the album but departed from Ruthless Records in early 1992; this changed the production of Temporary Insanity with different producers becoming involved. Eazy recorded between 30 and 60 songs for the album. The EP 5150: Home 4 Tha Sick was recorded at the same time and served as the precursor and introduction to the album. During the mastering and mixing process, Bryan Turner, head of Priority Records, received a tape copy of the album and said publicly that it was one of the best albums he had ever heard. The album became less tenable when Dr. Dre released his album The Chronic in December 1992, popularizing the G-funk sound while taking shots at Eazy-E. This caused Eazy-E to decided against releasing Temporary Insanity and the recordings were abandoned.

Several tracks that eventually appeared on Str8 off tha Streetz of Muthaphukkin Compton were originally planned for Temporary Insanity and were repurposed. These include "First Power," "Lickin Suckin Phukkin," "Hit the Hooker," "Sorry Louie," "My Babyz Mama," and "Nutz on Ya Chin."

== See also ==
- List of number-one R&B albums of 1996 (U.S.)
- 5150: Home 4 Tha Sick
- Eazy-E discography
