= Fila Fresh Crew =

American hip hop group

The Fila Fresh Crew

Background information
- Origin: West Dallas, Texas, U.S.
- Genres: Hip hop
- Years active: 1987–1988
- Labels: Macola, Comptown
- Past members: Doc-T; Fresh K Dr. Rock

The Fila Fresh Crew was a hip-hop group from Dallas, Texas. consisting of Fresh K, Dr. Rock and The D.O.C. (known then as Doc-T).

== History ==
Dr. Rock's association with Dr. Dre during his stint as a DJ for the World Class Wreckin' Cru helped land the Fila Fresh Crew a spot on the N.W.A and the Posse compilation album in 1987. A year later, the trio released the EP Tuffest Man Alive which was promoted with three singles.

Doc-T left the group and changed his name to The D.O.C., becoming a valuable contributor to Eazy-E's debut album and newly formed gangsta rap group N.W.A. Acting as a writer to many tracks with Ruthless Records (and later Death Row Records), the D.O.C. is most remembered for his 1989 debut album No One Can Do It Better featuring the hit single "It's Funky Enough".

Though the Fila Fresh Crew had disbanded by 1988, Dr. Rock launched a solo album of his own in 1991 under the pseudonym Fela Fresh Crew. In 2017, Tuffest Man Alive was released on CD for the first time with a previously released b-side ("I Wanna Know What Love Is") included as a bonus track.

== Discography ==
=== Extended play ===
Title	Album details
Tuffest Man Alive	Released: 1988; Label: Macola; Format: LP, cassette, CD

=== Singles ===
Year	Title	Album
1988	"I Hate to Go to Work"	Tuffest Man Alive
1988	"Dunk the Funk"	Tuffest Man Alive
1989	"Fear of the Rap"	Tuffest Man Alive

=== Guest appearances ===
Title	Year	Artist	Album
"Dunk the Funk"	1987	N.W.A	N.W.A. and the Posse
"Drink It Up"	1987	N.W.A	N.W.A. and the Posse
"Tuffest Man Alive"	1987	N.W.A	N.W.A. and the Posse
"3 the Hard Way"	1987	N.W.A	N.W.A. and the Posse

=== Music videos ===
Title	Album
"I Hate To Go To Work"	Tuffest Man Alive
