= Any Last Werdz =

Single by Eazy-E featuring Kokane & Cold 187um

from the album It's On (~~Dr. Dre~~) 187um Killa
- Released: January 11, 1994
- Recorded: 1993
- Studio: Audio Achievements (Torrance, California)
- Genre: West Coast hip-hop; gangsta rap; G-funk; hardcore hip-hop; horrorcore
- Length: 5:11
- Label: Ruthless; Relativity
- Songwriters: Eazy-E, Dirty Red
- Producer: Cold 187um

Eazy-E singles chronology
"Real Muthaphuckkin G's" (1993)	"Any Last Werdz" (1994)	"Luv 4 Dem Gangsta'z" (1994)

Music video
- "Any Last Werdz" on YouTube

"Any Last Werdz" is the second and final single from Eazy-E's EP, It's On (~~Dr. Dre~~) 187um Killa. It features Kokane and Cold 187um. It is one of only three tracks on the EP that avoid dissing Dr. Dre.

The single was released in 1994 as the follow-up to the popular "Real Muthaphuckkin G's" and was written by Eazy-E, Dirty Red and produced by Above the Law's Cold 187 um. Any Last Werdz did find some success on the charts, making it to #69 on the Hot R&B/Hip-Hop Songs and #5 on the Hot Rap Singles.

== Music video ==
The music video features cameos by Bone Thugs-n-Harmony. This was the last music video Eazy-E would make before his death.

== Single Track Listing ==
1. "Any Last Werdz" (Car Hop / Gunz) - 5:11
2. "Any Last Werdz" (Anotha Murder Version) - 5:11
3. "Any Last Werdz" (Street Version) - 5:11
4. "Any Last Werdz" (Radio Edit) - 3:30
5. "Any Last Werdz" (Car Hop / No Gunz) - 5:11
6. "Any Last Werdz" (Instrumental) - 5:11
