= We Want Eazy =

Single by Eazy-E

Single by Eazy-E featuring Dr. Dre and MC Ren

from the album Eazy-Duz-It
- B-side: "Still Talkin'"
- Released: 1988
- Recorded: 1988
- Studio: Audio Achievements (Torrance, California)
- Genre: Golden age hip hop; West Coast hip hop
- Length: 5:02
- Label: Ruthless; Priority
- Songwriter: The D.O.C.
- Producers: Dr. Dre; DJ Yella

Eazy-E singles chronology
| "Eazy-Duz-It" (1989) | "We Want Eazy" (1988) | "We're All in the Same Gang" (1992) |

Dr. Dre singles chronology
| "We Want Eazy" (1989) | "We're All in the Same Gang" (1990) |

MC Ren singles chronology
| "We Want Eazy" (1989) | "Ballad of a Menace" (1990) |

"We Want Eazy" is a song by American rapper Eazy-E. It was released as the third and final single from his debut album, Eazy-Duz-It. The song features fellow N.W.A members Dr. Dre and MC Ren and was produced by Dr. Dre and DJ Yella. "We Want Eazy" also appears on his greatest hits, Eternal E; a 12-inch remix of this song was released as a single in 1989 and appeared on the rapper's posthumous compilation, Featuring...Eazy-E.

The song borrows heavily from the Bootsy's Rubber Band's 1977 song "Ahh... The Name Is Bootsy, Baby!". In exchange for the use of the sample, Bootsy Collins makes a cameo appearance with Eazy-E at the video's conclusion.

== Music video ==
The music video for "We Want Eazy", directed by J. Kevin Swain, was released in 1988. It begins with Eazy being chased by an LAPD officer and dropping his signature Los Angeles Raiders baseball cap along the way. Eventually he is arrested and jailed, just hours before he is to perform at a concert. With the help of his cellmates (including Ice Cube who manages to appear in the crowd as well and MC Krazy Dee), Eazy is able to perform via a giant screen closed-circuit television connection "live from the Compton jail", while Dr. Dre and MC Ren share the role of hype man on stage. Near the end of the video, Eazy breaks out of his cell and through the screen, and joins his bandmates on stage for the concert's finale. The cast of Compton's Most Wanted, including MC Eiht, made a cameo in the crowd.

Two songs, "Boyz-n-the-Hood" and "Eazy-Duz-It" were used in the opening introduction of the music video.

== Cover ==
The cover of both the original and remix versions of the "We Want Eazy" single depicts Eazy-E himself in front of a crowd. There is an alternate cover art that would later be parodied with the album cover for former N.W.A bandmate Dr. Dre's multi platinum debut album The Chronic and pays homage to the Zig-Zag cigarette rolling paper company which had become very prominent in hip hop culture as it is most commonly used to wrap cannabis to smoke.

== Charts ==
| Chart (1989) | Peak position |
|---|---|
| US Hot R&B/Hip-Hop Songs (Billboard) | 43 |
