= Foe tha Love of $ =

Single by Bone Thugs-n-Harmony featuring Eazy-E

from the album Creepin on ah Come Up
- Released: February 7, 1995
- Recorded: 1994
- Genre: Gangsta rap
- Length: 4:32
- Label: Ruthless; Relativity; Epic
- Songwriters: Antoine Carraby, Mark Eric Green, Anthony Henderson, Stanley Howse, Steven Howse, Bryon McCane, Charles Scruggs, Yomo Smith, Eric Wright
- Producer: Yella

Bone Thugs-n-Harmony singles chronology
"Thuggish Ruggish Bone" (1994)	"Foe tha Love of $" (1995)	"The Points" (1995)

Eazy-E singles chronology
"Luv 4 Dem Gangsta'z" (1994)	"Foe tha Love of $" (1994)	"Just tah Let U Know" (1995)

Music video
- "Foe Tha Love Of $" on YouTube

"Foe tha Love of $" is the second single by American hip-hop group Bone Thugs-n-Harmony, featuring rapper Eazy-E, from their debut EP, Creepin on ah Come Up. The song was produced by DJ Yella and executive produced by Eazy-E. "Foe tha Love of $" was a huge success for the group, making it to #41 on the Billboard Hot 100, #37 on the Rhythmic Top 40 and #4 on the Hot Rap Singles. The music video is notable for being Eazy-E's last appearance in a music video before his death. The song was included in the soundtrack of the video game True Crime: Streets of LA, along with "Thuggish Ruggish Bone". DJ Screw has also remixed it on the 1996 mix "Chapter 24 - 9 Months Later".

Parts of this song (including Jewell's backing vocals) are recycled from the Yomo & Maulkie track "For the Love of Money", from their 1991 album Are U Xperienced?.

== Track listing ==
1. Foe tha Love of $ (LP Street) (featuring Eazy-E)
2. Foe tha Love of $ (Tha Yella Mix 9 Minutes Uv Funk) (featuring Eazy-E)
3. Moe Cheese (Instrumental)
4. Thuggish Ruggish Bone (U-Neek's Remix) (featuring Shatasha Williams)
5. Moe $ (Instrumental)
- Verse 1 - Flesh-n-Bone
- Verse 2 - Layzie Bone
- Verse 3 - Eazy-E
- Verse 4 - Bizzy Bone
- Verse 5 - Krayzie Bone

=== Other appearances ===
Foe tha Love of $ has also appeared on the following albums:

- The Collection Volume One (1998)
- The N.W.A Legacy, Vol. 2 (2002)
- Greatest Hits (2004)
- Greatest Hits (Chopped & Screwed) (2005)
- Featuring...Eazy-E (2007)

== Personnel ==
=== Tracks 1, 2, 3 and 5 ===
- Featured Guest: Eazy-E
- Additional Vocals: Jewell (uncredited)
- Produced by: DJ Yella for Yella Muzick
- Executive Produced by: Eazy-E
- Recorded & Mixed by: Donovan "Tha Dirt Biker" Sound at Audio Achievement Studios
- Published by: Ruthless Attack Muzick (ASCAP), Dollarz N Sense Muzick, D.J. Yella Muzick (BMI)

=== Track 4 ===
- Featured Guest: Shatasha Williams
- Produced by: DJ U-Neek for U-Neek Entertainment
- Co-produced by: Tony C
- Executive Produced by: Eazy-E
- Recorded & Mixed by: Aaron Connor, DJ U-Neek & Tony C at Trax Recording
- Published by: Ruthless Attack Muzick (ASCAP), Dollarz N Sense Muzick, Keenu Songs, Donkhris Music (BMI)

== Charts ==
Chart (1995)	Peak position
US Billboard Hot 100	41
US Hot R&B/Hip-Hop Songs (Billboard)	19
US Hot Rap Songs (Billboard)	4
US Cash Box Top 100	51

== Certifications ==
Certifications for "Foe tha Love of $"
Region	Certification	Certified units/sales
New Zealand (RMNZ)	Platinum	30,000^{‡}
^{‡} Sales+streaming figures based on certification alone.
