= Lil Eazy-E =

American rapper (born 1984)

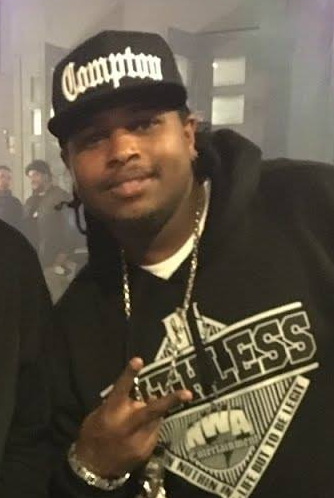
- Lil Eazy-E in 2017

Background information
- Also known as: Lil Eazy-E; Lil Eazy
- Born: Eric Darnell Wright Jr. April 23, 1984 (age 42); Compton, California, U.S.
- Genres: Hip hop; gangsta rap
- Years active: 2003–present
- Labels: Rich & Ruthless Records; Virgin; Ruthless

Eric Darnell Wright Jr. (born April 23, 1984), known professionally as Lil Eazy-E, is an American rapper. He is best known for being the son of Eazy-E. Wright is the president of Rich & Ruthless Records, an entertainment and business firm for musicians and entertainers. He and his brother Derreck Wright, formerly known as Baby Eazy-E, also founded Rich & Ruthless Cannabis, a cannabis grower and supplier.

== Early life ==
Eric Darnell Wright Jr. was born in Compton, California on April 23, 1984, and is the son of popular rapper Eazy-E. Wright was mostly raised by his grandmother; however, on the weekends, he would see his father until his death in 1995. He was 10 when his father died of HIV/AIDS.

== Career ==
In 2003, he entered the rap scene with his mixtapes and songs he wrote. He later signed with Virgin Records.

On September 13, 2012, it was reported that Lil Eazy-E was in contract negotiations with Death Row Records. The artist backed off from the deal, stating he would always be "Ruthless Records for life".

In 2014, he became the president of Rich & Ruthless Records and later created Rich & Ruthless Cannabis, one of the first celebrity marijuana brands. On May 17, 2021, he released the song "It Ain't Over."

== Discography ==
=== Collaboration albums ===
- 2023: The Legacy with Daz Dillinger

=== Mixtapes ===
- 2006: Cali Untouchable Radio 14: Rebirth Of Gangsta Rap
- 2006: This Ain't a Game [Hosted by Mixtape Messiah]

=== Singles ===
- 2005: "Gangsta Sh**"
- 2021: "It Ain't Over"

=== Also featured on ===
- "Lets Get It Crackin'" (with RizzyBoy) – True Crime: Streets of LA (2003)
- "Consequences" – True Crime: Streets of LA (2003)
- "We the Shit" (with Caviar) – O.G. Daddy V – O.G. Daddy V Presents Compton's Finest Mixtape Volume 1 (2003)
- "A Lil' Eazier Said" – Eazy-E – Eternal E (2005 reissue)
- "My Confession" – The Game – Nigga Witta Attitude (2006)
- "Men of Respect" (with Jim Jones & Rell) Papoose – The Fourth Quarter Assassin (2006)
- "What We Claimin' (Edited)" – DJ Nik Bean – Streetz Of L.A. 6 (2008)
- Rap or Die Vol. 3
- September 7 – Western Hospitality 2
- September 7 – Western Hospitality 3
- "Come Outta Compton" – Spider Loc – Bangadoshish (G-Unit West Special Edition) (2006)
- "The New West Coast" (with Mr. Capone-E) – Thug Radio Mixtape 15: Hard As Steel (2006)
- "This Ain't a Game" (feat. Bone Thugs-N-Harmony) – Waist Deep (2006)
- "Outside" (The Game featuring E-40, Mvrcus Blvck and Lil Eazy-E) - The Documentary 2.5 (2015)
- "Sick Kidz" (Violent J featuring Nova Rockafeller, Lil Eazy-E & Young Wicked) – Tour Single (2016)
- L.W.A. (Mr. Criminal featuring Lil Eazy-E) - L.W.A: Latin with Attitude (2016)
- Lil Eazy (Blue Intro) (Mr. Criminal featuring Lil Eazy-E) - L.W.A: Latin with Attitude (2016)
- Kickin' Back Being Blue (Mr. Criminal featuring Glasses Malone, Big Tray Deee, Lil Eazy-E, Tha Chill, Big 2da Boy) - L.W.A: Latin with Attitude (2016)
- Studio Gangstas (Spice 1 featuring Lil Eazy-E, MC Eiht, Nawfside Outlaw) - Platinum O.G. (2019)

== Filmography ==
Television
Year	Title	Role	Notes
2018–present	Growing Up Hip Hop	Himself	
