= Beverly Hills Cop III (soundtrack) =

Beverly Hills Cop III: Original Motion Picture Soundtrack

Soundtrack album by Various artists
- Released: May 10, 1994
- Recorded: 1993–1994
- Genres: R&B; rock; hip hop
- Length: 41:20
- Label: MCA Records
- Producers: John Landis (exec.); Leslie Belzberg (exec.); Jimmy Jam and Terry Lewis; Bernard "Touter" Harvey; Brian Holland; Carl "Groove" Martin; Darnell Van Rensalier; Dr. Jam; Garfield Bright; Ian Lewis; Keith Forsey; Lamont Dozier; Marc Gay; Nile Rodgers; Raphael Saadiq

Singles from Beaverly Hills Cop III Soundtrack
- 1. "The Right Kinda Lover" Released: May 10, 1994; 2. "Luv 4 Dem Gangsta'z" Released: May 10, 1994; 3. "The Place Where You Belong" Released: August 2, 1994

Professional ratings
Review scores
Source	Rating
AllMusic	2/5 stars
Music Week	3/5 stars

Beverly Hills Cop III: Original Motion Picture Soundtrack is the soundtrack to the 1994 film of the same name. It was released on May 10, 1994, by MCA Records and consisted mostly of R&B music with some rock and hip hop. Like the film, the soundtrack was not well received and only made it to 158 on the Billboard 200 and 66 on the Top R&B/Hip-Hop Albums. Three singles found minor success on the charts, "The Right Kinda Lover" by Patti LaBelle, "Luv 4 Dem Gangsta'z" by Eazy-E, and "The Place Where You Belong" by Shai. The song "Mood" which is performed by Chanté Moore also appears on her second album A Love Supreme. Nile Rodgers also covered Harold Faltermeyer's "Axel F" in a breakbeat hardcore version. In 2025 La La Land Records released a limited edition of the film’s score by Rodgers; this release also features additional material, including Wonderland Theme Park music and demos.

== Track listing ==
No.	Title	Writer(s)	Producer(s)	Length
1.	"The Place Where You Belong" (performed by Shai)	Trey Lorenz; Carl Martin; Darnell Van Rensalier; Garfield A. Bright; Marc Gay	Carl "Groove" Martin; Darnell Van Rensalier; Garfield Bright; Marc Gay	4:22
2.	"Summer Jamming" (performed by Inner Circle)	Ian Lewis	Bernard "Touter" Harvey; Ian Lewis	4:03
3.	"Luv 4 Dem Gangsta'z" (performed by Eazy-E)	Kevyn "Shaki" Carter; Henrik Milling	Dr. Jam	4:33
4.	"Mood" (performed by Chanté Moore)	James Harris III; Terry Lewis; Chanté Moore	Jimmy Jam and Terry Lewis	4:10
5.	"The Right Kinda Lover" (performed by Patti LaBelle)	James Harris III; Terry Lewis; Ann Nesby; James Quentin Wright	Jimmy Jam and Terry Lewis; James "Big Jim" Wright (co.)	4:52
6.	"Keep the Peace" (performed by INXS)	Andrew Farriss; Michael Hutchence; Keith Forsey; Mark Younger-Smith	Keith Forsey; Bill Drescher (co.)	4:29
7.	"Right Thing, Wrong Way" (performed by Terence Trent D'Arby)	James Harris III; Terry Lewis; Terence Trent D'Arby	Jimmy Jam and Terry Lewis; Terence Trent D'Arby (co.)	5:13
8.	"Leavin'" (performed by Tony! Toni! Toné!)	Raphael Wiggins; John "Jubu" Smith	Raphael Saadiq	4:04
9.	"Axel F" (performed by Nile Rodgers & Richard Hilton)	Harold Faltermeyer	Nile Rodgers	2:57
10.	"Come See About Me" (performed by The Supremes)	Holland–Dozier–Holland	Brian Holland; Lamont Dozier	2:37
Total length:				41:20

== Chart history ==
Chart (1994)	Peak position
US Billboard 200	158
US Top R&B/Hip-Hop Albums (Billboard)	66
