= Impact of a Legend =

2002 extended play by Eazy-E

EP by Eazy-E
- Released: March 26, 2002
- Recorded: 1993–1995
- Studio: Paramount Recordings (Los Angeles, CA)
- Genre: Hip hop
- Length: 28:51
- Labels: Ruthless; Epic
- Producers: Tomica Wright (exec.); Rhythm D

Eazy-E chronology
Str8 off tha Streetz of Muthaphukkin Compton (1996)	Impact of a Legend (2002)	Featuring...Eazy-E (2007)

Impact of a Legend is the third and final extended play by American rapper Eazy-E. It was released posthumously on March 26, 2002, the seventh anniversary of his death.

The EP was promoted by former groupmate Ice Cube, whom Eazy had made peace with shortly before his death in 1995. Despite reaching 113 on the Billboard 200, the EP sold poorly, making it Eazy-E's first project to not be certified by the RIAA. The EP spawned one single, "Switchez" featuring Roc Slanga. It also contains a bonus DVD with a short documentary, biography, music videos, a PC video game called Hittin' Switchez and a DVD video game called Cuttin Loose In Compton.

Professional ratings
Review scores
Source	Rating
Allmusic	2.5/5 stars

== Track listing ==
No.	Title	Length
1.	"Intro" (Featuring Rhythm D & Steffon)	1:06
2.	"Eazy 1, 2, 3" (Featuring The Genie, Paperboy & Phalos Mode)	4:01
3.	"Cock the 9" (Featuring Loco S.A.B & Phalos Mode)	4:02
4.	"Switchez" (Featuring Roc Slanga)	4:29
5.	"The Rev" (Skit)	1:13
6.	"No More Tears" (Featuring The Genie, Phalos Mode & Sacraphyce)	4:42
7.	"Ruthless Life" (Featuring Casish L.E.G.S.C & Loesta)	4:51
8.	"Still Fuckem" (Featuring The Genie, Paperboy & Phalos Mode)	4:25
Total length:		28:51

== Personnel ==
- Sean Williams - A&R administrator
- Madeleine Smith - A&R administrator
- Dave Lopez - mixing
- David Weldon - producer & featured artist (track 1)
- Tomica Wright - executive producer
- Eric Wright - main artist
- Steffon - featured artist (track 1)
- The Genie - featured artist (tracks 2, 6, 8)
- Paperboy - featured artist (tracks 2, 8)
- Phalos Mode - featured artist (tracks 2, 3, 6, 8)
- Loco S.A.B - featured artist (track 3)
- Roc Slanga - featured artist (track 4)
- Sacraphyce - featured artist (track 6)
- Cashish L.E.G.S.C - featured artist (track 7)
- Loesta - featured artist (track 7)

== Samples ==
Eazy 1, 2, 3

- "G'd Up" by Tha Eastsidaz

Switchez

- "More Bounce to the Ounce" by Zapp & Roger
- "Tom's Diner" by Suzanne Vega
- "Make the Music With Your Mouth Biz" by Biz Markie
- "Only If You Want It" by Eazy-E

Ruthless Life

- "Jamaica Funk" by Tom Browne
- " Nut'z On Ya Chin" by Eazy-E
