= Just tah Let U Know =

"Just Tah Let U Know"

Single by Eazy-E

from the album Str8 off tha Streetz of Muthaphukkin Compton
- B-side: "Tha Muthaphukkin Real"
- Released: December 5, 1995
- Recorded: August 1994
- Studio: Audio Achievements; (Torrance, California)
- Genre: Gangsta rap; G-funk
- Length: 4:09
- Label: Ruthless; Epic
- Songwriters: Eric Wright; Reginald "Big Reg" Pace
- Producer: Eazy-E

Eazy-E singles chronology
"Foe tha Love of $" (1994)	"Just Tah Let U Know" (1995)	"The Muthaphukkin Real" (1995)

"Just tah Let U Know" is a song by Eazy-E, released through Ruthless Records and Epic Records. It was one of Eazy-E's last recorded tracks before his death. It was released posthumously as the first of four singles on his second album, Str8 off tha Streetz of Muthaphukkin Compton (1996), and as a single on December 5, 1995. It was Eazy-E's final single to chart, and peaked at numbers 40 and 45 on the US Cash Box Top 100 and Billboard Hot 100, number 30 on Hot R&B/Hip-Hop Singles & Tracks, and at number four on Hot Rap Singles.

== Music video ==
The music video was released in 1995 and was done after Wright's death, it shows various footages of him and pictures. The music video features cameo appearances by MC Ren, DJ Yella, Bone Thugs-n-Harmony, Too Short, Kadeem Hardison, Bokeem Woodbine, Above the Law, BG Knocc Out, Gangsta Dresta, The Pharcyde, Rudy Ray Moore, Theo Mizuhara, and many more.

In the music video, Bokeem Woodbine plays a rap artist named 'Eric' who refuses to fairly pay his partner, played by Kadeem Hardison. In the video, Hardison's character grows angrier because he doesn't get his fair share of money and calls Eric out on his selfishness. Hardison's character would eventually try to murder Eric, but instead gets shot by Eric's assistant, which turned out to be a false memory.

== Charts ==
Chart (1995–1996)	Peak position
UK Singles (OCC)	32
US Billboard Hot 100	45
US R&B/Hip-Hop Singles Sales (Billboard)	11
US Hot R&B/Hip-Hop Songs (Billboard)	30
US R&B/Hip-Hop Airplay (Billboard)	66
US Hot Rap Songs (Billboard)	4
US Cash Box Top 100	40

== Track listing ==
Side A:

1. "Just Tah Let U Know" (Single version) – 4:09
2. "Just Tah Let U Know" (Ruthless "G" Radio mix) - 3:57
3. "Just Tah Let U Know" (Instrumental) – 4:09
4. 'Just Tah Let U Know" (Acapella)

Side B:

1. "Tha Muthaphukkin Real" - 4:21
2. "Tha Muthaphukkin Real" (Instrumental) - 4:21
3. "Tha Muthaphukkin Real" (Acapella) - 4:03
