= It's On (Dr. Dre) 187um Killa =

1993 extended play by Eazy-E

EP by Eazy-E
- Released: October 19, 1993
- Studio: Audio Achievements (Torrance, California)
- Genres: West Coast hip-hop; gangsta rap; G-funk
- Length: 37:23
- Labels: Epic; Ruthless
- Producers: Eazy-E (also exec.); Rhythm D; DJ Yella; Cold 187um; Dr. Jam; Madness 4 Real

Eazy-E chronology
5150: Home 4 tha Sick (1992)	It's On (Dr. Dre) 187um Killa (1993)	Eternal E (1995)

Singles from It's On (Dr. Dre) 187um Killa
- 1. "Real Muthaphuckkin G's" Released: August 26, 1993; 2. "Any Last Werdz" Released: January 11, 1994

Professional ratings
Review scores
Source	Rating
AllMusic	3.5/5 stars
The Encyclopedia of Popular Music	2/5 stars
The New Rolling Stone Album Guide	3.5/5 stars
The Source	2.5/5 stars
Spin Alternative Record Guide	2/10

It's On (Dr. Dre) 187um Killa (Note: Stylized on the album cover as It's On (~~Dr. Dre~~) 187^{um} Killa) is the second EP released by American rapper Eazy-E and the last project to be released during his lifetime. It was released on October 19, 1993 through Eazy-E's Ruthless Records, as a response to Dr. Dre's debut solo album The Chronic, which repeatedly attacks Eazy.

To follow up his 1992 EP 5150: Home 4 tha Sick, Eazy-E had planned a double album named Temporary Insanity. Yet to exploit Dre's spotlight and his May 1993 single "Fuck wit Dre Day", which mainly disses him, Eazy changed plans. On this EP, shots at Dre are absent from only two tracks: "Gimmie That Nutt" and "Boyz-N-Tha-Hood (G-Mix)". The lead single, "Real Muthaphuckkin G's"—which, alike "Any Last Werdz", carried a music video—became Eazy's most successful single. (Note: Incidentally, this EP was his first release under a Relativity Records distribution deal whereby Eazy's Ruthless owned the master recordings.)

== Commercial performance ==
To date, this is Eazy's most successful release, selling 110,600 copies in its first week. It peaked at number 5 on the Billboard 200 as well as at number 1 on Top R&B/Hip-Hop Albums chart. In 1994, it was certified double-platinum by the RIAA, with over 2 and a half million copies sold in America. It remains one of 2 gangsta rap EPs to go multi-platinum, alongside Bone Thugs-n-Harmony's Creepin on ah Come Up, which Eazy-E executive produced and also appeared on.

== Track listing ==
No.	Title	Writer(s)	Producer(s)	Length
1.	"Exxtra Special Thankz"	E. Wright; D. Weldon	Rhythm D	1:07
2.	"Real Muthaphuckkin G's" (featuring B.G. Knocc Out and Dresta)	A. Naqiyy; A. Wicker; E. Wright	Rhythm D	5:32
3.	"Any Last Werdz" (featuring Cold 187um and Kokane)	G. Hutchinson; J. Long	Cold 187um	5:09
4.	"Still a Nigga"	A. Carraby; E. Wright	DJ Yella	4:10
5.	"Gimmie That Nutt"	E. Wright; A. Carraby	DJ Yella & Eazy-E	2:55
6.	"It's On"	E. Wright	Rhythm D	5:02
7.	"Boyz N tha Hood (G-Mix)" (featuring Dresta)	O. Jackson	Dr Jam	5:38
8.	"Down 2 tha Last Roach" (featuring Dirty Red, B.G. Knocc Out & Kokane)	K. Carter; E. Wright; A. Hilton; J. Long	Madness 4 Real	7:50
Total length:				37:23

== Samples ==
- "Real Muthaphuckkin G's"
  - "Eazy-Duz-It" by Eazy-E
  - "It's Funky Enough" by the D.O.C.
- "Any Last Werdz"
  - "Gigolo" by the Fatback Band
- "Still a Nigga"
  - "Take Me Just as I Am" by Lyn Collins
  - "Sneakin' in the Back" by Tom Scott and the L.A. Express
- "Gimmie That Nutt"
  - "Green Acres" by Vic Mizzy, Eddie Albert and Eva Gabor
  - "Boyz-N-The-Hood" by Eazy-E
  - "Findum, Fuckum & Flee" by N.W.A
  - "Walk & Talk" by Syd Dale
- "It's On"
  - "Eazy-Duz-It" by Eazy-E
  - "Ruthless Villain" by Eazy-E
  - "Nuthin' But a 'G' Thang" by Dr. Dre feat. Snoop Doggy Dogg
  - "Fuck Wit Dre Day (And Everybody's Celebratin')" by Dr. Dre
  - "Gangsta Gangsta" by N.W.A
- "Boyz N Tha Hood (G-Mix)"
  - "Ruthless Villain" by Eazy-E
  - "Real Niggaz Dont Die" by N.W.A
  - "Eazy-Duz-It" by Eazy-E
- "Down 2 Tha Last Roach"
  - "Express Yourself" by N.W.A
  - "A Bitch Iz a Bitch" by N.W.A

== Personnel ==
- Tony Alvarez - additional engineer (track 1–2)
- Lasse Bavngaard - producer (track 8)
- Rasmus Berg - producer (track 8)
- David Bett - art direction
- Antoine Carraby - producer (track 4–5)
- Kevyn "Shaki" Carter - featured artist (track 8)
- Brian Cross - photography
- Jesper Dahl - producer (track 8)
- Brian Knapp Gardner - mastering
- Jerry Heller - management
- Arlandis Hinton - featured artist (tracks 2, 8)
- Gregory Fernan Hutchinson - featured artist & producer (track 3)
- Nicholas Kvaran - producer (track 8)
- Jerry Long Jr. - featured artist (track 3, 8)
- Henrik Milling - producer (track 7)
- Donovan "The Dirt Biker" Sound - mixing & recording
- Allan Wai - design
- David Weldon - producer (track 1–2, 6)
- Andre Desean Wicker - featured artist (track 2, 7)
- Eric "Eazy-E" Wright - main artist, artwork

== Charts ==
=== Weekly charts ===
Chart (1993)	Peak position
US Billboard 200	5
US Top R&B/Hip-Hop Albums (Billboard)	1

=== Year-end charts ===
Chart (1993)	Position
US Top R&B/Hip-Hop Albums (Billboard)	49

Chart (1994)	Position
US Billboard 200	83
US Top R&B/Hip-Hop Albums (Billboard)	34

== Certifications ==
Region	Certification	Certified units/sales
United States (RIAA)	2× Platinum	2,000,000^{^}
^{^} Shipments figures based on certification alone.

== See also ==
- List of number-one R&B albums of 1993 (U.S.)
