= 5150: Home 4 tha Sick =

1992 extended play by Eazy-E

EP by Eazy-E
- Released: December 15, 1992
- Recorded: 1992
- Studio: Audio Achievements (Torrance, California)
- Genres: West Coast hip-hop; gangsta rap
- Length: 18:07
- Labels: Ruthless; Priority
- Producers: Eazy-E (also exec.); Naughty by Nature; Cold 187um; Bobcat; Dr. Jam; Madness 4 Real

Eazy-E chronology
Eazy-Duz-It (1988)	5150: Home 4 tha Sick (1992)	It's On (~~Dr. Dre~~) 187^{um} Killa (1993)

Singles from 5150: Home 4 tha Sick
- 1. "Only If You Want It" Released: October 12, 1992; 2. "Neighborhood Sniper" Released: December 1992; 3. "Merry Muthafukkin' Xmas" Released: December 10, 1992

Professional ratings
Review scores
Source	Rating
AllMusic	2/5 stars
Spin Alternative Record Guide	3/10

5150: Home 4 tha Sick is the debut extended play by American rapper Eazy-E. It was released on December 15, 1992, by Ruthless Records and Priority Records. 5150: Home 4 tha Sick peaked at #70 on the Billboard 200 and #15 on the Top R&B/Hip-Hop Albums. It was the final original album from Ruthless Records to be released by Priority.

"Only If You Want It" was given both a single release and promotional music video. "Neighborhood Sniper" was also released as a single and also had a promotional music video released. "Merry Muthaphuckkin' Xmas" was released as a single by Record Store Day in a limited run of 2000 copies with "Niggaz My Height Don't Fight" as the B-side.

The EP was certified gold by the RIAA on February 9, 1993. All the songs were included on the remastered version of Eazy-E's premiere, Eazy-Duz-It. Reviews for the album, however, were generally negative.

== Background ==
5150: Home 4 tha Sick was conceived after Eazy-E's original project, Temporary Insanity, which was scheduled for a May 1993 release, was shelved due to changes at Ruthless Records following Dr. Dre's departure. Released on December 15, 1992, the EP helped maintain Eazy-E's presence in the hip-hop scene, featuring themes of gangsta rap and dark humor. Some of the tracks would later be reworked into his subsequent projects.

== Track listing ==
No.	Title	Writer(s)	Producer(s)	Length
1.	"Intro: New Year's E-vil"	E. Wright	Eazy-E	0:49
2.	"Only If You Want It"	A. Criss; E. Wright; K. Gist	Naughty by Nature	3:03
3.	"Neighborhood Sniper"	G. Hutchinson; J. Long; E. Wright	Cold 187um	5:14
4.	"Niggaz My Height Don't Fight"	C. Singleton; E. Wright; B. Ervin	DJ Bobcat	3:14
5.	"Merry Muthaphuckkin' Xmas" (featuring Dolemite, Atban Klann, Buckwheat & Menajahtwa)	E. Wright; R. Jackson; W. Adams; M. Fields; T. Hudson; R. Moore	Dr. Jam; Madness 4 Real	5:56

On the vinyl EP, "Merry Muthaphuckkin' Xmas" is listed as "Merry Muthafuckin' X-Mas".

== Production and style ==
5150: Home 4 tha Sick features production primarily from Eazy-E, alongside contributions from DJ Yella and Naughty by Nature. The EP combines Eazy-E's signature gangsta rap style with elements of dark humor and social commentary, reflecting the gritty realities of life in Compton. It juxtaposes aggressive lyrics with catchy hooks, creating a distinctive sound that resonated with fans.

However, by the time of its release in December 1992, some critics noted that the sound felt somewhat outdated, particularly as the West Coast hip-hop scene began to embrace the G-funk style popularized by Dr. Dre. Eazy-E's raw energy and straightforward lyricism were seen as a contrast to the evolving sound of the genre. As reported, the production choices on 5150 did not align with the emerging trends, which may have contributed to mixed critical reception during a time when innovation was key in hip-hop music.

The EP's reliance on hard-hitting rhythms and a less polished sound reflected Eazy-E's roots in gangsta rap while also highlighting the shifting landscape of hip-hop in the early 1990s.

== Personnel ==
- Bobby "Bobcat" Ervin – producer (track 4)
- Makeba Fields – guest appearance (track 5)
- Brian Knapp Gardner – mastering
- Jerry Heller – management
- Tarasha Hudson – guest appearance (track 5)
- Gregory Fernan Hutchinson – producer (track 3)
- Rahsaan "Buckwheat" Jackson – guest appearance (track 5)
- Henrik Milling – producer (track 5)
- Rudy Ray Moore – guest appearance (track 5) as Dolemite
- Dean Karr – photography
- Dino Paredes – art direction & design
- Donovan "The Dirt Biker" Sound – recording & mixing
- Eric "Eazy-E" Wright – main artist, executive producer, art direction & design
- Atban Klann – guest appearance (track 5)
- Madness 4 Real – producers (track 5)
- Naughty by Nature – producers (track 2)

== Charts ==
=== Chart positions ===
Chart (1992)	Peak position
US Billboard 200	70
US Billboard Top R&B/Hip-Hop Albums	15

=== Year-end charts ===
Chart (1993)	Position
US Billboard Top R&B/Hip-Hop Albums	64

== Certifications ==
Region	Certification	Certified units/sales
United States (RIAA)	Gold	500,000^{^}
^{^} Shipments figures based on certification alone.
