= Eazy-Duz-It (song) =

1989 single by Eazy-E

Single by Eazy-E

from the album Eazy-Duz-It
- A-side: "Ruthless Villain"
- B-side: "Radio"
- Released: 1988
- Recorded: 1988
- Studio: Audio Achievements (Torrance, California)
- Genre: West Coast hip hop; golden age hip hop; gangsta rap; hardcore hip hop
- Length: 4:21
- Label: Ruthless; Priority
- Songwriter: Lorenzo Patterson
- Producers: Dr. Dre; DJ Yella

Eazy-E singles chronology
"The Boyz-n-the Hood" (1987)	"Eazy-Duz-It" (1988)	"Eazy-er Said Than Dunn" (1989)

"Eazy-Duz-It" is a song by American rapper Eazy-E. It was released as the lead single from the album of the same name. It features the song "Radio" as a B-side. The B-side of the cassette single also contained the original version of the song "Compton's N the House" which only appears on the cassette single version, the vinyl single has a radio edit of "Eazy-Duz-It" instead of "Compton's N the House". There is a remix version of "Compton's N the House" that appears on N.W.A.'s Straight Outta Compton album, but the original can only be found on the cassette single and has never been released elsewhere.

"Eazy-Duz-It" was produced by Dr. Dre with co-production by DJ Yella, with Eazy-E's production debut. The verses describe Eazy's activities and often end with his shooting his enemies dead.

== Samples ==
Slim Thug sampled the line "...thug from around the way..." to make the song "Thug" from his Boss of All Bosses album. Also, the song's line was sampled by both Memphis, Tennessee acts Three 6 Mafia in "Ridin' Spinners", and Yo Gotti on his song "Thug from Around the Way."

The song famously starts out with a female voice (Michel'le) singing a parody of the theme from Gumby before getting cut off by Eazy. This part of the song has been sampled several times. Logic sampled this introduction in the creation of the instrumental for the song "Under Pressure". The intro has been cut short and looped to create the instrumental. It was also sampled by Kanye West and The Game in their 2022 song "Eazy", and Future, Metro Boomin, and Kendrick Lamar sampled the song's intro in their 2024 song "Like That". The second part of the song's introduction also interpolates the first verse of the 1970 hit "Ball of Confusion (That's What the World Is Today)" by The Temptations, and later in the song, the 1972 hit "Baby Let Me Take You (In My Arms)" by The Detroit Emeralds.

== Single track listing ==
=== A-side ===
1. "Eazy-Duz-It" – (4:18)
2. "Ruthless Villain" – (2:57)

=== B-side ===
1. "Radio" – (5:00)
2. "Eazy-Duz-It" (radio version) – (3:47)

=== Cassette single B-side ===
1. "Radio"
2. "Compton's N the House / 100% Diss (Dedicated to the Wacky Wack Crew)"
