= The Boyz-n-the Hood =

- Original 12" sleeve

Single by Eazy E

from the album N.W.A. and the Posse
- B-side: "L.A. Is the Place / Fat Girl" (Eazy E and Ron-De-Vu) (original issue, 1987); Dopeman" (N.W.A) (reissue, 1989)
- Released: March 3, 1987
- Recorded: 1987
- Studio: Audio Achievements (Torrance, California)
- Genre: Gangsta rap
- Length: 5:37
- Label: Macola; Priority; Ruthless
- Songwriter: Ice Cube
- Producer: Dr. Dre

Eazy E singles chronology
"The Boyz-n-the Hood" (1987)	"Eazy-Duz-It" (1989)

Alternative cover
- Cover of the 1989 maxi-12" reissue.

"The Boyz-n-the Hood" is the debut single by American rapper Eazy E, a member of the hip-hop group N.W.A. Released in March 1987, the single was a local hit, reissued by year's end on the unauthorized compilation album N.W.A. and the Posse.

== Background ==
Eric Wright, who founded Ruthless Records in 1987, had tasked the Ruthless song-writing team — record producer Dr. Dre, aided by Arabian Prince, and ghostwriter Ice Cube — to draft the song in line with Wright's vision. But when the song was rejected by the New York-based rap group HBO (Home Boyz Only) whom it had first been pitched to, Wright decided to rap it himself, under the name "Eazy E". In 1989, having gained rapper MC Ren and producer DJ Yella, N.W.A released its official debut album, Straight Outta Compton.

While N.W.A's Straight Outta Compton album spurred the Los Angeles area's hip hop to drop electro and rapidly go hardcore, the rappers still called it "reality rap", whereas news media would soon call it "gangsta rap". Meanwhile, in 1988, "The Boyz-n-the Hood" was remixed for Eazy's debut album Eazy-Duz-It. After N.W.A's disbanding in 1991, Eazy's EP titled It's On (~~Dr. Dre~~) 187^{um} Killa, released in 1993, brought another remix, "Boyz n tha Hood (G-mix)".

The song was released in August 2015, the film Straight Outta Compton had renewed interest in N.W.A when, on September 5, "Boyz-n-the Hood" debuted on the Billboard Hot 100. That week, at #50, it was the chart's third-highest debut, behind the 1989 title track "Straight Outta Compton" (the other song being "Hit the Quan"), originally too incendiary for wide radio play.

== Production ==
In 1987, in Compton, a city in Los Angeles county, Eric Wright, a local drug dealer, founded Ruthless Records via industry knowledge and connections of music manager Jerry Heller and via musical talent and recording facilities brought by Dr. Dre and Arabian Prince, two DJs, record producers, and recording artists successful locally. The team drew Ice Cube, member of the local rap trio C.I.A., to ghostwrite lyrics. That same year, Wright invited the recently NYC-signed rap group "H.B.O", or Home Boys Only, to the Audio Achievements recording studio in nearby city, Torrance, to record the Ruthless song-writing team's song "Boyz-n-the Hood".

With a rough instrumental draft already recorded by Dr. Dre, assisted by Arabian Prince, H.B.O., appraising the lyrics still on paper, rejected the song and walked out. Left sitting in the studio without Ice Cube present to start with, Dre encouraged Wright to rap the song himself. To get each line rapped in timing with its bar, they recorded line by line across two days, recalls DJ Yella. Still, the first-time rapper, dubbed Eazy-E, brought a distinctive voice and persona. As released, the single musically samples rap group Whodini's song "I'm a Ho". And it vocally samples rap group the Beastie Boys' song "Hold It, Now Hit It" as well as two soul classics, Jean Knight's song "Mr. Big Stuff" and, in closing, The Staple Singers' song "I'll Take You There".

== Lyrics ==
In "The Boyz-n-the Hood" lyrics, Eazy-E is the protagonist and tells a story of an ordinary day “in the hood.” The song details E seeing a friend Kilo-G after Kilo-G has stolen a car. Kilo-G brags to E about committing grand theft auto. E then relates a story of a prior friend, JD who became addicted to crack and attempted to steal E's car radio. E chases JD to call a truce, but JD pulls a .22 calibre pistol on E. Unbeknownst to JD, E has a 12 gauge and he ends up killing JD. Eazy, "bored as hell", went to a spot where his friends gather. There E drinks alcohol and then goes to get his girlfriend for sex. At her home, they get into an altercation and E slaps his girlfriend. Her father witnesses this and jumps up yelling at E. E then hits her father knocking him unconscious.

Later, Eazy wrecked his own car and as he was walking witnessed the arrest of Kilo-G. He attempted to bail Kilo-G out, but bail was denied due to a riot Kilo-G started while he was in lock up. At his trial, Kilo-G was given a six-year sentence for his crimes as this was Kilo-G's fourth offense. Probably anticipating a long jail sentence, Kilo had planned to have his girlfriend Suzy help him to escape. At the code word “fire” which Kilo-G yelled out, Suzy entered the court room with a "sub machine Uzi". The plan did not work and Suzy was shot. Kilo-G and Suzy were then both charged with attempted murder.

== Versions ==
The original version of the song, released as a single and on the compilation album N.W.A. and the Posse (1987), contains only five verses, starting with the line "Cruisin' down the street in my six-fo'". Minor lyrical changes are also present in the album version.

The first remix version, which was released on Eazy-E's 1988 debut album Eazy-Duz-It, contains a prologue that has Eazy-E describing playing "Gangsta Gangsta", a track from N.W.A's then-upcoming album Straight Outta Compton, before announcing he will play his own song, which then leads into the original "The Boyz-n-the Hood" verses.

Another remix version titled "The Boyz-n-the Hood (G-Mix)" was included on Eazy-E's second EP It's On (~~Dr. Dre~~) 187^{um} Killa in 1993, with rapper Dresta opening the song, before Eazy raps the original lyrics.

Both the original and the remix versions of "The Boyz-n-the Hood" appear on the 1989 12" maxi-single. They are featured on side A, while the original and remixed versions of "Dopeman" appear on side B.

The song was played on the Up In Smoke Tour, which was being headlined by Dr. Dre and Snoop Dogg. Dr. Dre played this song as a tribute to Eazy-E, with the crowd singing the chorus.

== Critical reception and legacy ==
Jeff Chang describes "The Boyz-n-the Hood" as "an anthem for the fatherless, brotherless, state-assaulted, heavily armed West Coast urban youth" and Eazy-E's rap style as "a deadpan singsong...perhaps as much a result of self-conscious nervousness as hardcore fronting."

Rolling Stone ranks the song as among the 20 greatest West Coast rap songs that preceded N.W.A's Straight Outta Compton. Critic David Drake commented: "It was a day-in-the-life record that was less concerned with commentary or critique than simply conveying a lifestyle." Also writing for Rolling Stone, Brian Hiatt compares the subject matter and flow in "The Boyz-n-the Hood" to "6 in the Mornin'" by Ice-T and "P.S.K. What Does It Mean?" by Schoolly D.

The song would inspire the title for John Singleton's 1991 film Boyz n the Hood.

== Cover versions ==
Red Hot Chili Peppers often covered the song live as an intro jam to their own song, "Special Secret Song Inside" on their 1989-90 Mother's Milk tour and briefly as an intro to the same song in 1991 on their Blood Sugar Sex Magik tour. They would again cover it as an intro jam to their songs "Sir Psycho Sexy" in 1999, "Snow ((Hey Oh))" in 2007, "Suck My Kiss" in 2012 and most recently in 2024 as an intro jam to "Right on Time" and "Me and My Friends.

In 2004, the song was re-imagined and sampled by rapper Jim Jones on his debut album On My Way to Church. His version was called "Certified Gangstas", and featured Bezel and Cam'ron.

Besides Jim Jones' song there have been many remakes, most notably a cover by alternative rock band Dynamite Hack, which hit #12 on the Billboard Modern Rock Tracks in 2000.

Hispanic rap group Brownside did a remake to the song called "Vatos in the Barrio" on their 1999 album Payback. The instrumental of the original is remade, and the lyrics are slightly different but keep the main structure of the Eazy-E version.

Underground Memphis rapper Koopsta Knicca of Three 6 Mafia made his own version called "Back in da Hood".

Shwayze uses one of the lines from the "Boyz-n-the Hood" remix in his song "Lost My Mind"; the line he uses is "Woke up at about noon just thought that I had to be in Compton soon".

It is sampled in "Front Back" by UGK (as well as its remix by T.I.), "My 64" by Mike Jones (featuring Bun B, Snoop Dogg and Lil' Eazy-E), "Pojat On Huudeilla" by Eurocrack, "Them Boys Down South" by Big Chance.

Track 8 (Disc 2) on DJ Screw's album "The Legend" has the same song style as Boyz-n-the-Hood.

Yelawolf made a song called "Boyz in the Woodz" for his 2008 mixtape Ball of Flames: the Ballad of Slick Rick E. Bobby. The song interpolates the original chorus but is made to have a "white trash" feel.

American rapper Megan Thee Stallion sampled the song in her 2020 single "Girls in the Hood". Eazy-E's daughters, Henree, and Ebie Wright both supported the song.

== Personnel ==
- Eazy-E - Vocals
- Ice Cube - Lyrics
- Dr. Dre - Production

== Charts ==
Chart (2015)	Peak position
Australia (ARIA)	69
US Billboard Hot 100	50
US Hot R&B/Hip-Hop Songs (Billboard)	18
US Hot Rap Songs (Billboard)	14

== Certifications ==
Region	Certification	Certified units/sales
United Kingdom (BPI)	Silver	200,000^{‡}
^{‡} Sales+streaming figures based on certification alone.
