= N.W.A. and the Posse =

- (L-R) Top: DJ Train (obscured), Sir Jinx; Middle: MC Chip, MC Ren, Eazy-E, Dr. Dre, K-Dee, Ice Cube, Arabian Prince, DJ Scratch; Bottom: Krazy Dee, Candyman.

Compilation album by N.W.A
- Released: November 6, 1987 (original); November 13, 1989 (reissue)
- Genre: West Coast hip-hop; gangsta rap; electro-funk
- Length: 46:26
- Label: Macola (original); Ruthless (reissue); Priority (reissue)
- Producer: Dr. Dre; Arabian Prince

N.W.A chronology
N.W.A. and the Posse (1987)	Straight Outta Compton (1989)

Singles from N.W.A. And The Posse
- 1. "Boyz-n-the-Hood" Released: March 3, 1987; 2. "Panic Zone" Released: August 13, 1987

Professional ratings
Review scores
Source	Rating
AllMusic	3/5 stars
The Rolling Stone Album Guide	3/5 stars
Spin Alternative Record Guide	4/10

N.W.A. and the Posse is a compilation/split album, re-releasing N.W.A and associated groups' underground rap songs from the Los Angeles area's rap scene on November 6, 1987. It is regarded as American rap group N.W.A's first but neglected album; N.W.A's authorized debut studio album, rather, is Straight Outta Compton, released in January 1989. Whereas Straight Outta Compton was certified platinum, one million copies sold that July, N.W.A. and the Posse was certified gold, half as many copies sold, in April 1994.

N.W.A and the Posse is notable for being the first professional recording featuring the talents of Eazy-E (who had recently formed N.W.A with the album's contributors Dr. Dre, Ice Cube and Arabian Prince), Myka 9 (then-called Microphone Mike) and the D.O.C. (then-called Doc-T).

== Backstory ==
Originally not N.W.A.'s intended album release, the Posse album was released by Macola Records—which was then the Los Angeles hip-hop scene's main distributor—by collecting songs, mainly from N.W.A.'s EP titled N.W.A., that Macola had distributed for Ruthless Records, a record label set up by N.W.A.'s Eazy-E.

Six of the 11 tracks on the N.W.A And The Posse album are from then-N.W.A. members: Eazy-E, Dr. Dre, Ice Cube and Arabian Prince. MC Ren and DJ Yella were not yet in N.W.A, however the former does appear on the cover photograph. One track is of Microphone Mike, later called Myka 9, along with Rappinstine, a traveling faction of the DJ crew World Class Wreckin' Cru, whose core had yielded N.W.A.'s Dr. Dre and DJ Yella.

Four of the Posse album's tracks are from the Fila Fresh Crew, a rap crew including Doc-T, who soon renamed himself The D.O.C. Dr. Dre discovered them in Texas, where a DJ friend of his, Dr. Rock, had invited him to perform at a nightclub, where the Fila Fresh Crew was performing. These four tracks had previously been distributed by Macola Records.

Macola omitted the N.W.A. track "A Bitch iz a Bitch" (not included on the EP either) to favor party, electro sounds, like the "Panic Zone" track, that led the Los Angeles rap scene until N.W.A's Straight Outta Compton album hit. In November 1989, after the commercial success of Straight Outta Compton that same year, Ruthless' distributor Priority Records re-issued the N.W.A and the Posse album with the track "A Bitch iz a Bitch" replacing "Scream".

== Macola ==
The World Class Wreckin' Cru', including future N.W.A members Dr. Dre and DJ Yella, led by Grandmaster Lonzo, along with C.I.A which included future member Ice Cube were signed to Lonzo's label Kru-Cut Records, a sublabel of Macola Records, the area's leading independent distributor of rap records. The success of Eazy’s single "Boyz-n-the-Hood" prompted Eazy's call for an N.W.A EP, distributed by Macola. The EP's five songs included Eazy and Cube on "Dopeman", Eazy on "8 Ball", and Arabian's production "Panic Zone."

After the release of the EP, N.W.A left Macola and signed to Priority. Macola was unhappy with the departure and wanted to cash in on the group. They took the songs from Eazy's "Boyz-n-the-Hood" single as well as the N.W.A EP and combined them with other songs from related groups that Macola had in their library. this resulted in the N.W.A and the Posse album.

== Cover photo ==
For the EP's cover photo which is the same cover used for the album, Eazy summoned N.W.A's members to pose for the camera in a Hollywood alleyway near Macola's office. Reportedly, some who were photographed wound up there by merely driving or accompanying another. Future N.W.A rapper MC Ren, living near Eazy, although photographed, was not yet in N.W.A. On the other hand, DJ Yella is absent due to being sick on the day the photo was taken (although he also was not active within the group yet, just a close friend of Dre). Rapper Candyman is also in the photo, bottom right kneeling down.

== Track list ==
All songs produced by Dr. Dre and Arabian Prince.

N.W.A. and the Posse track listing
No.	Title	Writer(s)	Performers	Length
1.	"Boyz-n-the-Hood"	Ice Cube	Eazy-E	5:37
2.	"8 Ball"	Ice Cube	N.W.A.	4:26
3.	"Dunk the Funk"	Dr. Rock; Fresh K; The D.O.C.	Fila Fresh Crew featuring The D.O.C.	5:01
4.	"Scream"	M. "Microphone Mike" Troy; Rappinstine	M. "Microphone Mike" Troy; Rappinstine	3:18
5.	"Drink It Up"	Dr. Rock; Fresh K; The D.O.C.	Fila Fresh Crew featuring The D.O.C.	4:45
6.	"Panic Zone"	Arabian Prince; Krazy Dee; Dr. Dre	N.W.A.	3:33
7.	"L.A. Is the Place"	Ice Cube	Eazy-E; Ron-De-Vu	4:31
8.	"Dope Man"	Ice Cube	N.W.A.	6:16
9.	"Tuffest Man Alive featuring The D.O.C."	Dr. Rock; Fresh K; The D.O.C.	Fila Fresh Crew featuring The D.O.C.	2:16
10.	"Fat Girl"	Ice Cube	Eazy-E; Ron-De-Vu	2:45
11.	"3 the Hard Way"	Dr. Rock; Fresh K; The D.O.C.	Fila Fresh Crew featuring The D.O.C.	4:10
Total length:				46:26

1989 reissue, replacing "Scream"
No.	Title	Writer(s)	Performers	Length
4.	"A Bitch iz a Bitch"	Ice Cube	N.W.A.	3:10

Notes

- Panic Zone and Dope Man contains uncredited vocals from Krazy Dee

== Certifications ==
Region	Certification	Certified units/sales
United States (RIAA)	Gold	500,000^{^}
^{^} Shipments figures based on certification alone.
