= Eazy-Duz-It =

1988 studio album by Eazy-E

Studio album by Eazy-E
- Released: November 22, 1988
- Recorded: 1988
- Studio: Audio Achievements (Torrance, California)
- Genres: West Coast hip hop; gangsta rap
- Length: 50:00
- Labels: Ruthless; Priority
- Producers: Dr. Dre; DJ Yella

Eazy-E chronology
Eazy-Duz-It (1988)	5150: Home 4 tha Sick (1992)

Singles from Eazy-Duz-It
- 1. "Eazy-Duz-It" Released: 1988; 2. "We Want Eazy" Released: 1988; 3. "Eazy-er Said Than Dunn" Released: 1989

Eazy-Duz-It is the debut studio album by American rapper Eazy-E. It was released on November 22, 1988, by Ruthless Records and Priority Records. The album charted on two different charts and went 2× Platinum in the United States despite very little promotion by radio and television. Three singles were released from the album, each charting in the US. The remastered version contains tracks from the extended play (EP), 5150: Home 4 tha Sick (1992). The 25th anniversary (2013) contains two bonus tracks which are 12" remixes of "We Want Eazy" and "Still Talkin.'"

Released a year after the split record N.W.A. and the Posse (where Eazy-E debuted on numerous tracks, both with N.W.A and as a solo artist), and predating that group's debut album Straight Outta Compton by two months, Eazy-Duz-It is recognized as his first professional full-length recording and has been regarded as a groundbreaking album for gangsta rap. It is also the only full-length solo album Eazy-E released in his lifetime before his death in 1995.

== Recording and production ==
Eazy-Duz-It was recorded at Audio Achievements in Torrance, California, in mid-1988, very shortly before N.W.A began recording their debut album Straight Outta Compton. Marcus Reeves, author of Somebody Scream!: Rap Music's Rise to Prominence in the Aftershock of Black Power (2009), described MC Ren's writing style as "elaborate storytelling and acrobatic verbiage", while the D.O.C.'s included "syllabically punchy boasts" and Ice Cube wrote, "masterfully insightful first-person narratives." Ice Cube's writing was often inspired by comedians like Richard Pryor and Rudy Ray Moore.

The album's production, almost solely done by Dr. Dre and DJ Yella, was praised by several critics. Jason Birchmeier from AllMusic gave a considerable amount of attention to the album's production, saying that "Dr. Dre and Yella meld together P-Funk, Def Jam-style hip hop, and the leftover electro sounds of mid-[19]80s Los Angeles, creating a dense, funky, and thoroughly unique style of their own." Birchmeier would also write that some songs—"Eazy Duz It", "We Want Eazy", "Eazy-er Said Than Dunn", and "Radio"—are all heavily produced and have "layers upon layers of samples and beats competing with Eazy-E's rhymes for attention." Rapper and producer Kanye West also touted Dr. Dre's production on the album.

== Composition ==
Glen Boyd of Blogcritics said that the album has "Deep-ass bass lines, old-school funk samples, and plenty of street smart ghetto attitude are what powers this record." Jerry Heller wrote that Eazy raps more up front on the album than he does on Straight Outta Compton, and insists that the album's lyrics contain more sexual humor than gangsta vibe.

The album's title track and lead single "Eazy-Duz-It", written by MC Ren, opens with a little girl singing the theme song from the Gumby TV series, but with the lyrics changed to acclaim Eazy-E's style. Eazy then interrupts saying "Bitch shut the fuck up, get the fuck outta here." This is followed by a bass line provided by Dr. Dre. Soon, Eazy begins to rap about himself and things that he does. The song declares that Eazy is a "hardcore villain" who collects money from his prostitutes, and feels great when his "pockets are fat." The chorus, repeated three times, states that he "is a gangsta having fun". The piece is laden with the aural mainstays of gangsta rap, including gunshots, and references to several drugs.

"Eazy-Duz-It"
The album's title track is a heavily produced song from the album.

"Boyz n the Hood" was written by Ice Cube, with some contribution by Eazy-E. It was originally released in 1986, two years prior and this album features a remix. The song is about growing up in Compton, California, and describes the gangster lifestyle. It conceives the "ghetto landscape as a generalized abstract construct… [and] also introduces a localized nuance that conveys a certain proximity, effectively capturing a narrowed sense of place through which young thugs and their potential crime victims move in tandem," as put by cultural historian Murray Forman.

"No More ?'s" is similar to "Boyz n the Hood" in its theme. The piece begins with an interview between Eazy and a female journalist, who asks about his childhood. Eazy explains (in verse) that he was ruthless, in a gang, "specialized in gankin," (loosely, to steal from) and had no respect for rules. He is then asked if he has ever been in an armed robbery. He responds, "You mean a 211?" The following verses tell of Eazy's exploits as a thief and thug.

== Critical reception ==
Professional ratings
Review scores
Source	Rating
AllMusic	4/5 stars
The Austin Chronicle	3/4 stars
RapReviews	8/10
The Rolling Stone Album Guide	2/5 stars
Spin Alternative Record Guide	7/10
The Village Voice	C+

Music journalist Robert Christgau gave the album a C+, criticizing the thin beats and lyrics like "I might be a woman beater but I'm not a pussy eater". The New York Times considered it "a wild party album" and "a throwback to knuckleheaded 60's hits like the Coasters' 'Yakety-Yak'—a welcome outbreak of silliness in today's earnest pop climate."

AllMusic's Jason Birchmeier noted that "the album plays like a humorous, self-centered twist on Straight Outta Compton with Eazy-E, the most charismatic member of N.W.A, front and center while his associates are busy behind the scenes, producing the beats and writing the songs." He compared it to N.W.A's Straight Outta Compton, which Eazy also performs on, saying that Straight Outta Compton is "more revolutionary," but claimed Eazy-Duz-It to be Straight Outta Compton's "great companion" and to have showcased N.W.A's style. The Spin Alternative Record Guide (1995) gave the album a seven out of ten rating, referring to it as "comparatively forgotten" compared to Straight Outta Compton, while noting it was a more funny, with "scraps of dialogue and mock interviews, more thoroughly cinematic" while that the albums attempts to promote Eazy-E as a major gangster was "nonsense".

Soren Baker from the Los Angeles Times called it a "landmark albums brimming with violence, profanity, sexually explicit content and antigovernment themes," and said that it established Eazy as a "major player in the rap industry". Daniel Kreps of the Los Angeles Times called it a "solo masterpiece," and said that it was evidence that Eazy was one of the best rappers ever. Dan Snierson of Entertainment Weekly described the album as "an obscenity-littered depiction of violent, hollowed-out life in Compton."

Shan Fowler from PopMatters said that it received "underground success." Glen Boyd reviewed the album for Blogcritics, noting that it "paved the way for all of the groundbreaking music which came later." Boyd also said that songs like "Boyz-n-the-Hood" and "Radio" would establish "the street buzz that N.W.A would later ride to platinum selling success as the first true West Coast rap superstars." Jon Wiederhorn from MTV wrote that it "demonstrated Eazy's knack for provocative lyrics," and also said that it paved the way to Straight Outta Compton, which was released about two months after Eazy-Duz-It.

In 2022, Rolling Stone ranked the album 153rd on their list of "The 200 Greatest Hip-Hop Albums of All Time".

== Commercial performance ==
Eazy-Duz-It was released on November 22, 1988. The album received very little attention from radio and television stations, but got support from Los Angeles's hip-hop underground. On May 20, 1989, it peaked at No. 41 on the Billboard 200, and since 1989, was in various places on the chart for over 90 weeks. It peaked at No. 12 on the Top R&B/Hip-Hop Albums chart on March 11, 1989. Since the album's release, it has been on the chart during 51 different weeks. On February 15, 1989, the album was certified Gold (500,000 sales) by the Recording Industry Association of America, and on June 1, 1989, it was certified Platinum (1,000,000 sales). It received its peak certification by the RIAA of Double Platinum (2,000,000 sales) on September 1, 1992. In 1989, it had sold over 650,000 copies, and by early 1995, Eazy-Duz-It had sold 2.5 million copies. On February 11, 1989, "We Want Eazy" charted on the R&B/Hip-Hop Songs at number 43. It stayed on the chart for over 15 weeks. The song also charted at number seven on the Hot Rap Songs chart. "Eazy-er Said Than Dunn", the album's 3rd single, peaked at number 84 on the R&B/Hip-Hop Songs charts on May 6, 1989, where it would maintain some lower position on the chart for six weeks. "Eazy-Duz-It" charted on the Hot Dance Singles Sales chart at number 39. In August 2015, a couple weeks after the release of the N.W.A. biopic film, Straight Outta Compton, the album re-entered the chart at No. 32 on the Billboard 200, out-peaking its original peak position in 1989.

== Track listing ==
- All songs produced by Dr. Dre and DJ Yella

No.	Title	Writer(s)	Length
1.	"Still Talkin'"	Eric Wright; O'Shea Jackson; Tracy Curry	3:51
2.	"Nobody Move"	Lorenzo Patterson; Andre Young	4:49
3.	"Ruthless Villain" (featuring MC Ren)	Patterson; Young	2:59
4.	"2 Hard Mutha's" (featuring MC Ren)	Wright; Patterson	4:26
5.	"Boyz-n-the-Hood (Remix)"	Wright; Jackson; Henrik Rasmussen	6:22
6.	"Eazy-Duz-It"	Wright; Patterson; Young; George Clinton; Bernie Worrell; William Collins; Abrim Tilmon	4:21
7.	"We Want Eazy" (featuring MC Ren and Dr. Dre)	Wright; Clinton; Collins; Maceo Parker	5:01
8.	"Eazy-er Said Than Dunn"	Young; Jackson; Patterson; Rufus Thomas; Eddie Floyd; Mack Rice	3:41
9.	"Radio"	Wright; Patterson; Young	4:58
10.	"No More ?'s"	Wright; Jackson	3:55
11.	"I'mma Break It Down"	Wright; Patterson	3:29
12.	"Eazy-Chapter 8 Verse 10"	Wright; Jackson	2:11
Total length:			50:00

== Notes ==
- The original cassette & LP excluded "Ruthless Villain".
- The 2002 re-release includes the 1992 EP 5150: Home 4 tha Sick.

== Personnel ==
The following personnel can be verified by the album's notes.

- Eazy-E – Executive producer and performer
- Dr. Dre – Producer and performer
- Yella – Producer
- MC Ren – Writer and performer
- The D.O.C. – Writer and performer
- Ice Cube – Writer and performer
- Stan the Guitarman – Guitar/bass
- Big Bass Brian – Mastering
- Eric Poppleton – Photography
- Donovan "The Dirt Biker" Smith – Sound engineer

== Charts ==
=== Chart positions ===
Chart (1988–1989)	Peak position
US Billboard 200	41
US Billboard Top R&B/Hip-Hop Albums	12

=== Year-end charts ===
Chart (1989)	Position
US Billboard 200	45
US Billboard Top R&B/Hip-Hop Albums	14

=== Chart positions ===
Chart (2015)	Peak position
US Billboard 200	32

== Certifications ==
Region	Certification	Certified units/sales
United States (RIAA)	2× Platinum	2,500,000

== Release history ==
Year	Type	Edition	Label	Catalog	Ref
1988	CD	—	Ruthless	57100	
1988	CD	Clean	Ruthless	57111	
1988	CS	Clean	Ruthless	571114	
1988	LP	—	Priority	571001	
1988	CS	—	Priority	57100	
1991	CD	—	Universal Music Distribution	?	
1993	CD	—	BCM Records	555612	
2002	CD	—	EMI	5410412	
2002	CS	Bonus	Priority Records	41041	
2002	LP	Bonus	Priority Records	41041	
2002	DI	Bonus Clean	Priority Records	42067	
2003	DI	—	EMI Digital	0049925710052	
2003	DI	—	EMI Digital	0049925711158	
2010	DI	"Uncut Snoop Dogg Approved"	Priority Records	26868	
"—" denotes that it was a standard release.
