= DJ Yella =

American music producer and DJ (born 1961)

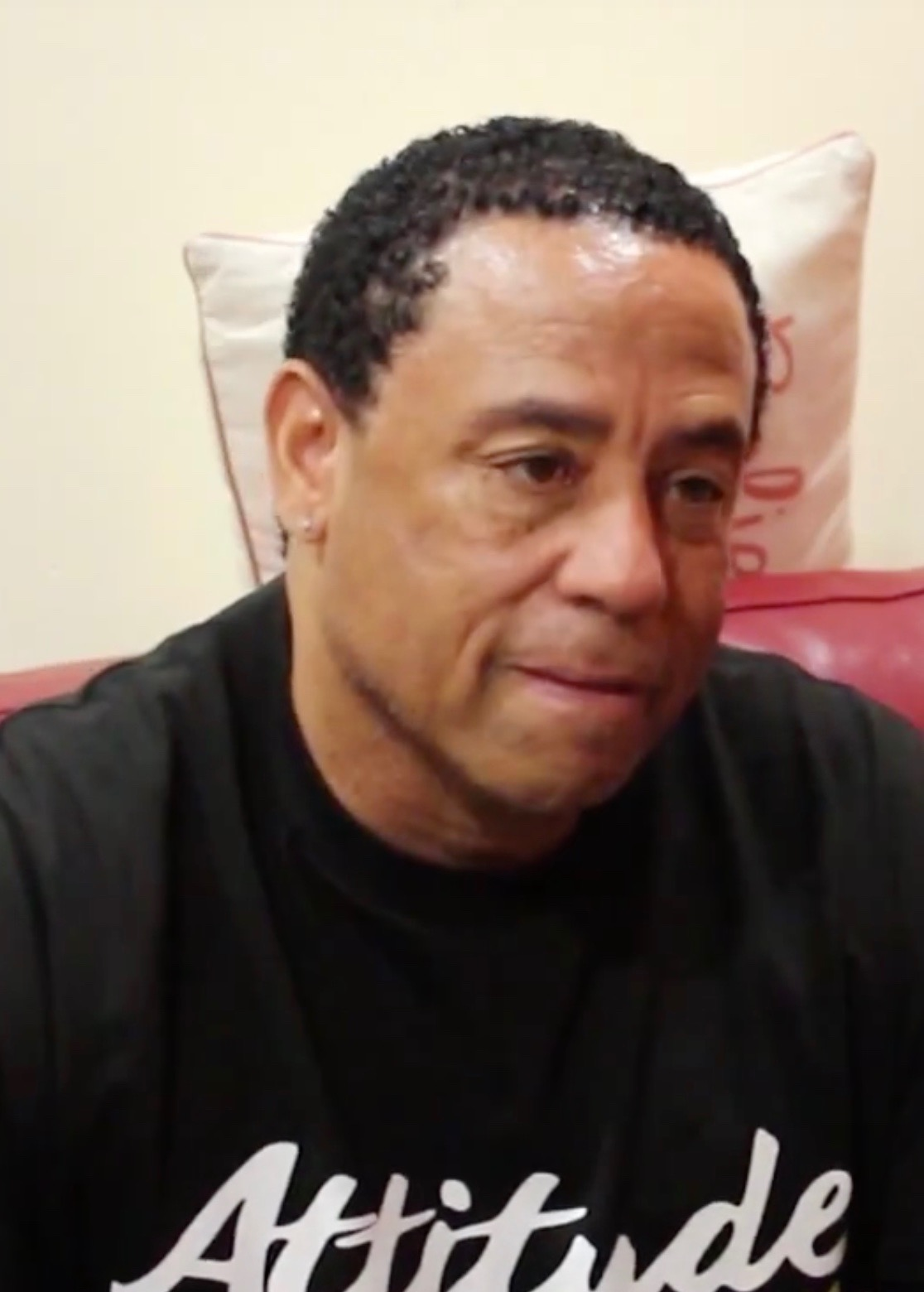
- DJ Yella in 2015

Background information
- Also known as: Yella; Yellaboy
- Born: Antoine Carraby; December 11, 1961 (age 64); Compton, California, U.S.
- Genres: Hip-hop; gangsta rap; electro
- Occupations: Disc jockey; record producer; rapper; film director
- Instruments: Turntables; keyboards; drums; vocals
- Label: High Powered Productions
- Formerly of: World Class Wreckin' Cru; N.W.A
- Website: djyellaofnwa.com

Antoine Carraby (born December 11, 1961), better known by his stage name DJ Yella, is an American DJ, record producer, and former pornographic film producer and director from Compton, California.

DJ Yella began his career as a member of the World Class Wreckin' Cru along with Dr. Dre. He later joined the pioneering gangsta rap group N.W.A (originally composed of Dr. Dre, Ice Cube, Arabian Prince and Eazy-E) and became the least vocal but longest-lasting member of the group. His first and only studio album One Mo Nigga ta Go was released in 1996 through Street Life Records and was dedicated to Eazy-E. After the release of the album he left the music industry to direct pornographic films until 2011, when he started working on a new album called West Coastin. However, as of 2026, the album remains unreleased.

== Early life ==
Antoine Carraby was born in Compton, California, on December 11, 1961, and raised in Los Angeles.

The second youngest of nine children, Carraby grew up poor and considered himself something of a loner. His parents divorced when he was four years old, and he lived primarily with his mother.

He was passionate about music from a young age. He grew up listening to funk music and learned to play the drums. As a teenager, he performed at various clubs of Los Angeles by the name of Yella which was inspired by Tom Tom Club's Mr. Yellow. After watching Run-D.M.C. perform in California for the first time, him and Dre both were amazed to see them on-stage with nothing more than a DJ scratching. They attempted to make a few records themselves in the nightclub Eve After Dark, owned by Alonzo Williams.

== Career ==
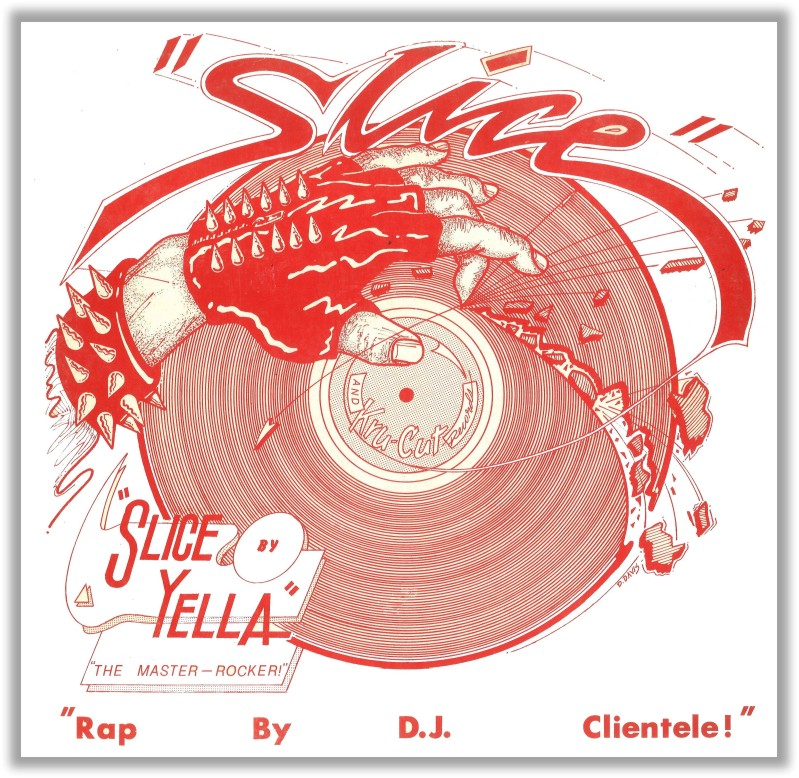
The cover for Yella's first single "Slice" (1984) with the Wreckin' Cru

Yella began DJ'ing as a teenager in a local club called Eve After Dark. At the club he met aspiring DJ Dr. J, later to become member Dr. Dre of N.W.A. Eve After Dark had a back room with a small four-track studio. In this studio, Yella and Dre recorded several demos. In their first recording session, they recorded a song entitled "Surgery". Influenced by Grandmaster Flash, Yella and Dre formed the World Class Wreckin' Cru in the early '80s, which released its debut album under the Kru-Cut label in 1985. The group would become stars of the electro-hop scene that dominated early-mid 1980s West Coast hip-hop. "Surgery", recorded and released prior to the group's official formation, was their first hit, selling 50,000 copies in Compton alone. DJ Yella and Dr. Dre also performed mixes for local radio station KDAY, boosting ratings for its afternoon rush-hour show The Traffic Jam.

Along with Dre, Yella helped produce Eazy-E's debut album Eazy-Duz-It and the two N.W.A albums, along with the 100 Miles and Runnin' EP. Along with Dr. Dre and Arabian Prince, Yella co-produced J.J. Fad's gold certified debut (Super Sonic) and also Michel'le's (self-titled) album and contributed to The D.O.C.'s 1989 album No One Can Do It Better (also produced by Dre). Jerry Heller, in his 2006 memoir Ruthless, witnessed Dre and Yella's work together, writing that the two had an "almost eerie understanding", as they crafted high quality beats and productions with almost no words or full sentences needing to be spoken. Yella remained close to Eazy and stayed on production duties at Ruthless Records after the acrimonious breakup of N.W.A. He produced J.J. Fad's second album Not Just a Fad (1990), Yomo & Maulkie's album Are U Xperienced? (1991), two tracks from Eazy-E's It's On (~~Dr. Dre~~) 187^{um} Killa (1993), the gold-selling hit single "Foe tha Love of $" from Bone Thugs-N-Harmony's Creepin on ah Come Up EP, Menajahtwa's album Cha-licious, and tracks from H.W.A.'s Az Much Ass Azz U Want E.P. (all three from 1994). He also helped produce Eazy's final album Str8 off tha Streetz of Muthaphukkin Compton, released about a year after his sudden death in 1995 from AIDS-related complications.

Yella released his 1996 debut solo album One Mo Nigga ta Go on Street Life Records as a tribute to Eazy-E, featuring members of the Ruthless "family tree" Kokane, B.G. Knocc Out, Dirty Red, and Dresta, rhyming over his productions. The album peaked at number 82 on the Billboard 200 albums chart and at number 23 on the Top R&B/Hip-Hop Albums chart in the US.

After this record he retired from music to embark on a 12-year career directing and producing pornographic films. Yella says he produced more than 300 adult films.

Yella was played by Neil Brown Jr. in the 2015 N.W.A biopic, Straight Outta Compton. He is portrayed as very promiscuous, and also as less aggressive than the other members and unwilling to engage in conflict with Ice Cube.

In April 2016, Yella reunited with the former members of N.W.A at Coachella.

== Awards and honors ==
In 2016, Yella was inducted into the Rock and Roll Hall of Fame as a member of N.W.A. In 2024, Yella and the other members of N.W.A. received a Grammy Lifetime Achievement Award. He showed up to accept the award along with Ice Cube, MC Ren, The D.O.C and Lil Eazy E.

== Discography ==
=== Studio albums ===
Album information
One Mo Nigga ta Go
- Released: March 26, 1996
- Chart positions: #82 US, #23 Top R&B/Hip Hop

=== Collaboration albums ===
with World Class Wreckin' Cru

- World Class (1985)
- Rapped in Romance (1986)

with N.W.A.

- Straight Outta Compton (1989)
- 100 Miles and Runnin' (1990)
- Niggaz4Life (1991)

== Selected works ==
Year	Artist	Album	Role	Tracks
1984	Yella	"Slice"/"Kru Groove"	Performer	Both songs
1985	World Class Wreckin' Cru	World Class	Vocals, drum programming	Entire EP
1986	World Class Wreckin' Cru	Rapped in Romance	Vocals	Entire album
1988	Eazy-E	Eazy-Duz-It	Producer	Entire album
1988	J.J. Fad	Supersonic	Producer, mixing, backing vocals	Entire album
1989	N.W.A	Straight Outta Compton	Producer	Entire album
1989	The D.O.C.	No One Can Do It Better	Drums	"Comm. Blues", "Comm. 2" and "The Grand Finalé"
1989	Michel'le	Michel'le	Mixing	Entire album
1990	N.W.A	100 Miles and Runnin'	Producer	Entire EP
1990	J.J. Fad	Not Just a Fad	Producer	Entire album
1991	N.W.A	Niggaz4Life	Producer, co-writer	Entire album; co-wrote "Real Niggaz Don't Die", "Real Niggaz", "She Swallowed It", "I'd Rather Fuck You" and "Approach to Danger"
1991	Yomo & Maulkie	Are U Xperienced?	Producer	Entire album
1993	Eazy-E	It's On (~~Dr. Dre~~) 187^{um} Killa	Producer, co-writer	"Still a Nigga" and "Gimmie That Nutt" (co-wrote both songs)
1994	Bone Thugs-n-Harmony	Creepin on ah Come Up	Producer	"Intro", "Foe tha Love of $ and "Moe Cheese"
1994	Menajahtwa	Cha-licious	Both producer and executive producer	Entire album
1994	H.W.A.	Az Much Ass Azz U Want	Producer	"High Timez"
1996	Eazy-E	Str8 off tha Streetz of Muthaphukkin Compton	Producer	"First Power", "Ole School Shit", "Sippin on a 40", "Tha Muthaphukkin Real", "Lickin, Suckin, Phuckin", "Creep N Crawl", "Gangsta Beat 4 tha Street" and "Eternal E"
1996	Yella	One Mo Nigga ta Go	Both producer and executive producer	Entire album

== Filmography ==
Films
Year	Title	Role	Notes
1993	Niggaz4Life: The Only Home Video	Himself	Documentary
2017	The Defiant Ones	Himself	TV documentary

Biographical portrayals in film
Year	Title	Portrayed by	Notes
2015	Straight Outta Compton	Neil Brown Jr.	Biographical film about N.W.A
2016	Surviving Compton: Dre, Suge & Michel'le	Deric Augustine	Biographical film about Michel'le
