= Ruthless Records discography =

Ruthless Records is an American record label founded by Eazy-E in 1987, specializing in hip hop music. The discography includes all albums, compilations, EPs and singles released.

== Studio releases and extended plays ==
List of studio albums, with selected chart positions, sales figures and certifications
Title	Album details	Peak chart positions								Sales	Certifications
Title	Album details	US	US R&B	AUS	CAN	FRA	GER	NZ	UK	Sales	Certifications
Supersonic (album by J. J. Fad)	Released: July 5, 1988; Labels: Ruthless, Atco; Formats: CD, LP, cassette, digital download	49	20	—	—	—	—	—	—	US: 600,000	RIAA: Gold
Eazy-Duz-It (album by Eazy-E)	Released: November 22, 1988; Labels: Ruthless, Priority; Formats: CD, LP, cassette, digital download	32	12	82	—	—	—	—	—	US: 2,600,000	RIAA: 2× Platinum
Straight Outta Compton (album by N.W.A)	Released: January 25, 1989; Labels: Ruthless, Priority; Formats: CD, LP, cassette, digital download	4	1	8	58	17	36	43	35	US: 3,500,000	RIAA: 3× Platinum
No One Can Do It Better (album by The D.O.C.)	Released: June 16, 1989; Labels: Ruthless, Atco; Formats: CD, LP, cassette, digital download	20	1	—	—	—	—	—	—	US: 1,100,000	RIAA: Platinum
Michel'le (album by Michel'le)	Released: October 23, 1989; Labels: Ruthless, Atco; Formats: CD, LP, cassette, digital download	35	5	—	—	—	—	—	—	US: 550,000	RIAA: Gold
Livin' Like Hustlers (album by Above the Law)	Released: February 22, 1990; Labels: Ruthless, Epic; Formats: CD, LP, cassette, digital download	75	14	—	—	—	—	—	—	US: 475,000	
The Power of a Woman (album by Tairrie B)	Released: May 25, 1990; Labels: Ruthless, MCA; Formats: CD, LP, cassette, digital download	—	—	—	—	—	—	—	—	US: 10,500	
100 Miles and Runnin' (EP by N.W.A)	Released: August 14, 1990; Labels: Ruthless, Priority; Formats: CD, LP, cassette, digital download	27	10	33	—	—	—	32	38	US: 1,100,000	RIAA: Platinum
Not Just a Fad (album by J. J. Fad)	Released: November 13, 1990; Labels: Ruthless, Atco; Formats: CD, LP, cassette, digital download	—	—	—	—	—	—	—	—	US:320,000	
Niggaz4Life (album by N.W.A)	Released: May 28, 1991; Labels: Ruthless, Priority; Formats: CD, LP, cassette, digital download	1	1	—	—	—	—	—	25	US: 2,150,000	RIAA: Platinum
Addictive Hip Hop Muzick (album by Kokane)	Released: July 2, 1991; Labels: Ruthless, Epic; Formats: CD, LP, cassette, digital download	—	—	—	—	—	—	—	—		
Vocally Pimpin' (EP by Above the Law)	Released: July 16, 1991; Labels: Ruthless, Epic; Formats: CD, LP, cassette, digital download	120	37	—	—	—	—	—	—	US: 240,000	
Are U Xperienced? (album by Yomo & Maulkie)	Released: September 14, 1991; Labels: Ruthless, Atco; Formats: CD, LP, cassette, digital download	—	—	—	—	—	—	—	—	US: 48,000	
Muzical Madness (album by Jimmy Z)	Released: October 1, 1991; Labels: Ruthless Records; Formats: CD, LP, cassette, digital download	—	—	—	—	—	—	—	—	US: 3,500	
Paid the Cost (album by Penthouse Players Clique)	Released: April 21, 1992; Labels: Ruthless, Priority; Formats: CD, LP, cassette, digital download	75	28	—	—	—	—	—	—	US:402,000	
Kizz My Black Azz (EP by MC Ren)	Released: June 30, 1992; Labels: Ruthless, Priority; Formats: CD, LP, cassette, digital download	12	10	—	—	—	—	—	—	US: 1,410,000	RIAA: Platinum
5150: Home 4 Tha Sick (EP by Eazy-E)	Released: December 15, 1992; Labels: Ruthless, Priority; Formats: CD, LP, cassette, digital download	70	15	—	—	—	—	—	—	US: 540,000	RIAA: Gold
Black Mafia Life (album by Above the Law)	Released: February 2, 1993; Labels: Ruthless, Giant; Formats: CD, LP, cassette, digital download	37	6	—	—	—	—	—	—	US: 380,000	
It's On (Dr. Dre) 187um Killa (EP by Eazy-E)	Released: October 19, 1993; Labels: Ruthless, Relativity; Formats: CD, LP, cassette, digital download	5	1	—	—	—	—	—	—	US: 2,250,000	RIAA: 2× Platinum
Shock of the Hour (album by MC Ren)	Released: November 16, 1993; Labels: Ruthless, Relativity; Formats: CD, LP, cassette, digital download	22	1	—	—	—	—	—	—	US: 555,000	
Future Profits (album by Blood of Abraham)	Released: November 16, 1993; Labels: Ruthless, Relativity; Formats: CD, LP, cassette, digital download	—	—	—	—	—	—	—	—	US: 10,000	
Az Much Ass Azz U Want (EP by H.W.A.)	Released: February 22, 1994; Labels: Ruthless, Relativity; Formats: CD, LP, cassette, digital download	—	74	—	—	—	—	—	—	US: 140,000	
Funk Upon a Rhyme (album by Kokane)	Released: April 12, 1994; Labels: Ruthless Records; Formats: CD, LP, cassette, digital download	—	56	—	—	—	—	—	—	US: 70,000	
Creepin on ah Come Up (EP by Bone Thugs-n-Harmony)	Released: June 21, 1994; Labels: Ruthless, Relativity; Formats: CD, LP, cassette, digital download	12	2	—	—	—	—	—	—	US: 2,150,000	RIAA: 2× Platinum
Uncle Sam's Curse (album by Above the Law)	Released: July 12, 1994; Labels: Ruthless, Relativity; Formats: CD, LP, cassette, digital download	113	15	—	—	—	—	—	—	US: 310,000	
Cha-licious (album by Menajahtwa)	Released: August 23, 1994; Labels: Ruthless, Relativity; Formats: CD, LP, cassette, digital download	—	—	—	—	—	—	—	—	US: 100,500	
E. 1999 Eternal (album by Bone Thugs-n-Harmony)	Released: July 25, 1995; Labels: Ruthless, Relativity; Formats: CD, LP, cassette, digital download	1	1	—	14	—	—	10	39	US: 4,350,000	RIAA: 4× Platinum
Smile Now, Die Later (album by Frost)	Released: October 24, 1995; Labels: Ruthless, Relativity; Formats: CD, LP, cassette, digital download	—	36	—	—	—	—	—	—	US: 290,000	
Str8 off tha Streetz of Muthaphukkin Compton (album by Eazy-E)	Released: January 30, 1996; Labels: Ruthless, Relativity; Formats: CD, LP, cassette, digital download	3	1	—	—	—	—	—	—	US: 1,150,000	RIAA: Gold
The Villain in Black (album by MC Ren)	Released: April 9, 1996; Labels: Ruthless, Relativity; Formats: CD, LP, cassette, digital download	31	7	—	—	—	—	—	—	US: 325,000	
When Hell.A. Freezes Over (album by Frost)	Released: July 1, 1997; Labels: Ruthless, Relativity; Formats: CD, LP, cassette, digital download	154	61	—	—	—	—	—	—	US: 60,000	
The Art of War (album by Bone Thugs-n-Harmony)	Released: July 29, 1997; Labels: Ruthless, Relativity; Formats: CD, LP, cassette, digital download	1	1	—	—	—	—	—	—	US: 4,250,000	RIAA: 4× Platinum
Ruthless for Life (album by MC Ren)	Released: June 30, 1998; Labels: Ruthless, Epic; Formats: CD, LP, cassette, digital download	100	14	—	—	—	—	—	—	US: 230,000	
Heaven'z Movie (album by Bizzy Bone)	Released: October 6, 1998; Labels: Ruthless, Relativity, Epic; Formats: CD, LP, cassette, digital download	3	2	—	—	—	—	—	—	US: 550,000	RIAA: Gold
Thug Mentality 1999 (album by Krayzie Bone)	Released: April 6, 1999; Labels: Ruthless, Relativity; Formats: CD, LP, cassette, digital download	4	2	—	—	—	—	—	—	US: 1,150,000	RIAA: Platinum
BTNHResurrection (album by Bone Thugs-n-Harmony)	Released: February 29, 2000; Labels: Ruthless, Relativity; Formats: CD, LP, cassette, digital download	2	1	—	—	—	—	—	—	US: 1,250,000	RIAA: Platinum
Thug By Nature (album by Layzie Bone)	Released: March 20, 2001; Labels: Ruthless, Relativity, Epic; Formats: CD, LP, cassette, digital download	43	17	—	—	—	—	—	—	US: 1,100,000	
Impact of a Legend (EP by Eazy-E)	Released: March 26, 2002; Labels: Ruthless, Epic; Formats: CD+DVD-V, digital download	—	—	—	—	—	—	—	—		
Thug World Order (album by Bone Thugs-n-Harmony)	Released: October 29, 2002; Labels: Ruthless, Relativity, Epic; Formats: CD, LP, cassette, digital download	12	3	—	—	—	—	—	—	US: 1,200,000	
New Kid Comin (album by Stevie Stone)	Released: September 29, 2009; Labels: Ruthless; Formats: CD, LP, cassette, digital download	—	—	—	—	—	—	—	—	US: 1,200	
Gazing at the Moonlight (album by Hopsin)	Released: October 27, 2009; Labels: Ruthless; Formats: CD, LP, cassette, digital download	—	—	—	—	—	—	—	—	US: 450	
"—" denotes a recording that did not chart or was not released in that territory.

== Compilation albums ==
List of studio albums, with selected chart positions, sales figures and certifications
Title	Album details	Peak chart positions								Sales	Certifications
Title	Album details	US	US R&B	AUS	CAN	FRA	GER	NZ	UK	Sales	Certifications
N.W.A. and the Posse (album by Various Artist)	Released: November 13, 1989; Labels: Ruthless, Priority; Formats: CD, LP, cassette, digital download	—	39	—	—	—	—	—	—		RIAA: Gold
Greatest Hits (album by N.W.A)	Released: July 2, 1996; Labels: Ruthless, Priority; Formats: CD, LP, cassette, digital download	48	20	9	—	—	—	43	49		RIAA: Gold
The N.W.A Legacy, Vol. 1: 1988–1998 (album by N.W.A)	Released: March 23, 1999; Labels: Ruthless, Priority; Formats: CD, LP, cassette, digital download	77	42	—	—	—	—	—	—		RIAA: Platinum
The N.W.A Legacy, Vol. 2 (album by N.W.A)	Released: August 27, 2002; Labels: Ruthless, Priority; Formats: CD, LP, cassette, digital download	154	38	—	—	—	—	—	—		
The Best of N.W.A: The Strength of Street Knowledge (album by N.W.A)	Released: December 26, 2006; Labels: Ruthless, Priority; Formats: CD, LP, cassette, digital download	72	47	33	—	—	—	—	—		
N.W.A and Their Family Tree (album by N.W.A)	Released: September 30, 2008; Labels: Ruthless, Priority; Formats: CD, LP, cassette, digital download	—	38	—	—	—	—	—	—		
"—" denotes a recording that did not chart or was not released in that territory.

== Singles ==
List of singles, with selected chart positions
Year	Title	Peak chart positions			Album
Year	Title	US	US R&B	US Rap	Album
1986	"Boyz-n-the-Hood"" (Eazy-E)	50	18	14	
1987	"Panic Zone" (N.W.A.)	—	—	—	
1988	"Eazy-Duz-It" (Eazy-E)	—	—	—	Eazy-Duz-It
1988	"It Is Love" (J.J. Fad)	92	—	—	Supersonic
1988	"Supersonic" (J.J. Fad)	31	—	—	Supersonic
1988	"Way Out" (J.J. Fad)	61	—	—	Supersonic
1988	"Straight Outta Compton" (N.W.A.)	38	13	—	Straight Outta Compton
1988	"Gangsta Gangsta" (N.W.A.)	—	91	11	Straight Outta Compton
1989	"Express Yourself" (N.W.A.)	—	45	2	Straight Outta Compton
1989	"We Want Eazy" (Eazy-E)	—	43	7	Eazy-Duz-It
1989	"Eazy-er Said Than Dunn" (Eazy-E)	—	84	—	Eazy-Duz-It
1989	"No More Lies" (Michel'le)	7	2	—	Michel'le
1989	"It's Funky Enough" (The D.O.C.)	—	12	1	No One Can Do It Better
1989	"The D.O.C. & The Doctor" (The D.O.C.)	—	—	1	No One Can Do It Better
1989	"The Formula" (The D.O.C.)	—	76	4	No One Can Do It Better
1989	"Mind Blowin'" (The D.O.C.)	—	—	3	No One Can Do It Better
1990	"Murder Rap" (Above the Law)	—	—	1	Livin' Like Hustlers
1990	"Untouchable" (Above the Law)	—	—	1	Livin' Like Hustlers
1990	"Keep Watchin" (Michel'le)	—	65	—	Michel'le
1990	"Nicety" (Michel'le)	29	5	—	Michel'le
1990	"Murder She Wrote" (Tairrie B)	—	—	27	Power of a Woman
1990	"Swingin' Wit' T" (Tairrie B)	—	—	28	Power of a Woman
1990	"100 Miles and Runnin'" (N.W.A)	—	51	2	100 Miles and Runnin'
1991	"Funky Flute" (Jimmy Z)	—	—	—	Muzical Madness
1991	"Something In My Heart" (Michel'le)	31	2	—	Michel'le
1991	"Appetite for Destruction" (N.W.A)	—	45	2	Niggaz4Life
1991	"Alwayz into Somethin'" (N.W.A)	—	37	1	Niggaz4Life
1991	"4 Tha Funk Of It" (Above the Law)	—	—	21	Vocally Pimpin'
1991	"Nickel Slick Nigga" (Kokane)	—	—	—	Addictive Hip Hop Muzick
1991	"Are U Xperienced?" (Yomo & Maulkie)	—	—	—	Are U Xperienced?
1991	"Mockingbird" (Yomo & Maulkie)	—	—	—	Are U Xperienced?
1991	"Mama Don't" (Yomo & Maulkie)	—	—	—	Are U Xperienced?
1991	"Glory" (Yomo & Maulkie)	—	—	—	Are U Xperienced?
1991	"We in the House" (J.J. Fad)	—	—	—	Not Just a Fade
1991	"Gold" (J.J. Fad)	—	—	—	Not Just a Fade
1992	"Explanation of a Playa" (Penthouse Players Clique)	—	—	15	Paid the Cost
1992	"Trust No Bitch" (Penthouse Players Clique)	—	—	—	Paid the Cost
1992	"P.S. Phuk U 2" (Penthouse Players Clique)	—	—	—	Paid the Cost
1992	"Final Frontier" (MC Ren)	—	80	17	Kizz My Black Azz
1992	"Only If You Want It" (Eazy-E)	—	—	—	5150: Home 4 Tha Sick
1992	"Call It What U Want" (Above the Law)	—	—	15	Black Mafia Life
1993	"V.S.O.P." (Above the Law)	—	97	9	Black Mafia Life
1993	"Real Muthaphukkin' G's" (Eazy-E)	42	31	2	It's On (Dr. Dre) 187um Killa
1993	"Same Old Shit" (MC Ren)	90	61	11	Shock Of The Hour
1993	"Stabbed By The Steeple" (Blood of Abraham)	—	—	—	Future Profits
1994	"Life" (Blood of Abraham)	—	—	—	Future Profits
1994	"All That (Juzt a Little Action)" (H.W.A.)	—	—	—	Az Much Ass Azz U Want
1994	"Any Last Werds" (Eazy-E)	—	69	5	It's On (Dr. Dre) 187um Killa
1994	"Slow Burnin' 22.5 Degrees Fahrenheit" (Kokane)	—	—	—	Funk Upon A Rhyme
1994	"Fuck What Ya Heard" (MC Ren)	—	—	—	Shock Of The Hour
1994	"Thuggish Ruggish Bone" (Bone Thugs-n-Harmony)	22	17	2	Creepin' On ah Come Up
1994	"Bakin' Soda Free" (Kokane)	—	—	—	Funk Upon A Rhyme
1994	"Black Superman" (Above the Law)	—	79	24	Uncle Sam's Curse
1994	"Foe Tha Love of $" (Bone Thugs-n-Harmony)	41	33	4	Creepin' On ah Come Up
1994	"La La La" (Menajahtwa)	—	—	—	Cha-licious
1994	"Giv tha Azz 2 No 1" (Menajahtwa)	—	—	—	Cha-licious
1995	"Kalifornia" (Above the Law)	—	—	—	Uncle Sam's Curse
1995	"1st of tha Month" (Bone Thugs-n-Harmony)	14	12	4	E. 1999 Eternal
1995	"East 1999" (Bone Thugs-n-Harmony)	62	39	8	E. 1999 Eternal
1995	"La Familia" (Frost)	—	—	39	Smile Now, Die Later
1995	"La Raza II" (Frost)	—	—	—	Smile Now, Die Later
1995	"East Side Rendezvous" (Frost)	62	74	73	Smile Now, Die Later
1995	"Just Tah Let U Know" (Eazy-E)	45	30	4	Str8 off tha Streetz of Muthaphukkin Compton
1995	"Sippin' On A 40" (Eazy-E)	—	—	—	Str8 off tha Streetz of Muthaphukkin Compton
1996	"Tha Crossroads" (Bone Thugs-n-Harmony)	1	1	1	E. 1999 Eternal
1996	"Creep N Crawl" (Eazy-E)	—	—	—	Str8 off tha Streetz of Muthaphukkin Compton
1996	"Mad Scientist" (MC Ren)	—	—	—	The Villain In Black
1996	"Keep It Real" (MC Ren)	—	106	43	The Villain In Black
1997	"Look into My Eyes" (Bone Thugs-n-Harmony)	4	4	2	The Art of War
1997	"What s Your Name (Time Of The Season)" (Frost)	—	90	32	When Hell.A. Freezes Over
1997	"If I Could Teach the World" (Bone Thugs-n-Harmony)	27	30	3	The Art of War
1998	"Ruthless For Life" (MC Ren)	115	61	13	Ruthless For Life
1998	"Comin' After You" (MC Ren)	—	—	—	Ruthless For Life
1998	"Thugs Cry" (Bizzy Bone)	—	—	—	Heaven'z Movie
1998	"Who In The Fuck" (MC Ren)	—	—	—	Ruthless For Life
1998	"Nobody Can Stop Me" (Bizzy Bone)	—	—	—	Heaven'z Movie
