= Above the Law discography =

Above The Law discography
- Studio albums: 8
- EPs: 1
- Singles: 13

The discography of the American hip hop group Above The Law consists of eighth studio albums, one extended play and thirteen singles.

== Albums ==
=== Studio albums ===
List of studio albums, with selected chart positions
Title	Album details	Peak chart positions	
Title	Album details	US	US R&B
Livin' Like Hustlers	Released: February 22, 1990; Label: Ruthless, Epic; Format: CD, LP, cassette, digital download	75	14
Black Mafia Life	Released: February 2, 1993; Label: Ruthless, Giant; Format: CD, LP, cassette, digital download	37	6
Uncle Sam's Curse	Released: June 12, 1994; Label: Ruthless, Relativity; Format: CD, LP, cassette, digital download	113	15
Time Will Reveal	Released: October 22, 1996; Label: Tommy Boy; Format: CD, LP, cassette, digital download	80	16
Legends	Released: February 16, 1998; Label: Tommy Boy; Format: CD, LP, cassette, digital download	142	27
Forever: Rich Thugs, Book One	Released: October 26, 1999; Label: Street Solid; Format: CD, cassette, digital download	—	—
Sex, Money & Music	Released: February 27, 2009; Label: Beatology; Format: CD, digital download	—	—
Pomona Love	Released: November 29, 2024; Label: MOBG; Format: Digital download	—	—

== Extended plays ==
List of extended plays, with selected chart positions
Title	EP details	Peak chart positions	
Title	EP details	US	US R&B
Vocally Pimpin'	Released: July 16, 1991; Label: Ruthless, Epic; Format: CD, LP, cassette, digital download	120	37

== Singles ==
List of singles with selected chart positions, showing year released and album name
Title	Year	Peak chart positions		Album
Title	Year	US R&B	US Rap	Album
"Murder Rap"	1990	—	1	Livin' Like Hustlers
"Untouchable"	1990	—	1	Livin' Like Hustlers
"4 the Funk of It"	1991	—	21	Vocally Pimpin'
"Call It What U Want"	1992	—	—	Black Mafia Life
"V.S.O.P."	1992	—	9	Black Mafia Life
"Black Superman"	1994	79	24	Uncle Sam's Curse
"Kalifornia"	1995	—	—	Uncle Sam's Curse
"100 Spokes"	1996	81	24	Time Will Reveal
"Endonesia"	1996	—	—	Time Will Reveal
"City of Angels" (featuring Frost)	1996	—	—	The Crow: City of Angels (soundtrack)
"Adventures Of..."	1997	—	—	Legends
"The Streets" / "Be About Yo Bizniz"	1998	—	—	Legends
"Throw Yo Hood Up" (Mr. Money Loc featuring Above the Law)	1998	61	10	—
"Sex, Money & Music"	2002	58	—	Sex, Money & Music
"—" denotes a recording that did not chart or was not released in that territory.

== Guest appearances ==
List of non-single guest appearances, with other performing artists, showing year released and album name
Title	Year	Other artist(s)	Album
"No Place to Hide"	1990	Stanley Clarke, George Duke	3
"We're All in the Same Gang"	1990	King T, Body & Soul, Def Jef, Michel'le, Tone Loc, MC Hammer, Ice-T, J. J. Fad, MC Ren, Dr. Dre, Young MC, Money-B, Shock G, Oaktown's 357, Eazy-E	We're All in the Same Gang
"Aftermath"	1994	Kokane, Dirty Red	Funk Upon a Rhyme
"Last Days"	1995	Frost, Kokane	Smile Now, Die Later
"Bring It On"	1996	MC Ren, Triggerman	The Villain in Black
"Satelite Niggaz"	1996	Big Syke	Be Yo' Self
"You Might Get Stuck"	1997	Laylaw	The Lawhouse Experience, Volume One
"Words 2 My First Born"	2001	2Pac	Until the End of Time
"Don't Do the Crime"	2003	Kam, Caviar	True Crime: Streets of LA (soundtrack)
"Lay You Down"	2011	Kokane	Gimme All Mine

== Production credits ==
Year	Artist	Album	Songs	Notes
1990	Above The Law	Livin' Like Hustlers	all tracks	Co-produced w/ Laylaw & Dr. Dre
1991	Above The Law	Vocally Pimpin'	all tracks	Co-produced w/ Laylaw
1991	Who Am I?	Addictive Hip Hop Muzick	all tracks	Co-produced w/ Laylaw & Dr. Dre
1993	Above The Law	Black Mafia Life	all tracks	
1994	Above The Law	Uncle Sam's Curse	all tracks	
1996	Above The Law	Time Will Reveal	14/15	
1998	Above The Law	Legends	all tracks	
1999	Above The Law	Forever: Rich Thugs, Book One	5/15	
