= Time Will Reveal =

Studio album by Above the Law
- Released: October 22, 1996
- Recorded: 1995−1996
- Studios: The Edge Recording Studio (Inglewood, CA); Audio Achievement (Torrance, CA)
- Genre: West Coast hip hop
- Length: 1:06:28
- Label: Tommy Boy
- Producer: Above the Law (also exec.)

Above the Law chronology
Uncle Sam's Curse (1994)	Time Will Reveal (1996)	Legends (1998)

Time Will Reveal is the fourth studio album by the American West Coast hip hop group Above the Law. Released in 1996 by Tommy Boy Records, it was the group's first record after leaving Ruthless Records following the death of member Eazy-E. The group's former labelmates Kokane and MC Ren made guest appearances on the record, along with Enuff, Daddy Cool and Kid Frost. Time Will Reveal peaked at number 16 on the Top R&B/Hip-Hop Albums chart and number 80 on the Billboard 200.

The album was primarily produced by Cold 187um with KM.G and Total K-oss, except for Cold 187 um's remix of "City of Angels" (the original version appeared on the film soundtrack to The Crow: City of Angels), which was produced by Tony G and Julio G. The album's lead single "100 Spokes" peaked at numbers 24 and 81 on both the Hot Rap Singles and Hot R&B/Hip-Hop Singles & Tracks charts.

== Critical reception ==
Professional ratings
Review scores
Source	Rating
AllMusic	3/5 stars
Muzik	3/5 stars
RapReviews	10/10 stars
The Source	3.5/5 stars

Alex Henderson of AllMusic wrote that "as predictable as ATL's lyrics are, Cold 187um's sleek production is something to admire. 187's very musical, Dr. Dre-influenced production style keeps things fresh, although the lyrics show little or no growth." Will Ashon of Muzik critiqued that Cold 187um was able to replicate the "squelch of pure Bootsy-style bass" on "1996" and "Shout 2 the True" with a "truly forbidding sheen of sounds" by displaying his "jazz skills" on "My World". El Surround of RapReviews said: "If you're looking for some original flava, which will take you back to the musical genius of the seventies, and gangsta rap which will remind you of the genre's glory days of the early 90's, this is a must have."

== Track listing ==
No.	Title	Length
1.	"Intro"	1:44
2.	"Encore"	5:01
3.	"Evil That Men Do"	5:06
4.	"Table Dance" (Skit)	1:37
5.	"Gorillapimpin'" (featuring Enuff & Kokane)	5:31
6.	"1996"	4:37
7.	"Killaz in the Park" (featuring MC Ren)	5:44
8.	"100 Spokes"	3:59
9.	"Clinic 2000" (featuring Daddy Cool, Enuff & Kokane)	4:52
10.	"My World"	4:54
11.	"Endonesia"	5:08
12.	"Shout 2 the True"	4:30
13.	"Playaz & Gangstas"	4:37
14.	"City of Angels (Remix)" (featuring Frost)	4:59
15.	"Apocalypse Now"	4:09
Total length:		1:06:28

== Personnel ==
- Gregory Fernan Hutchinson - vocals, executive producer, producer (tracks 1–13, 15), remixing (track 14), recording
- Kevin Michael Gulley - vocals, executive producer, co-producer
- Anthony Stewart - vocals, executive producer, co-producer
- Jerry Long Jr. - vocals (tracks 5, 9), backing vocals
- Dorinda "DoRe'" Roberts - vocals (tracks 1–2, 8)
- Michael Sims - vocals (track 7), bass, guitar
- Gee - vocals (tracks 1, 7)
- Enuff - vocals (tracks 5, 9)
- Lorenzo Patterson - vocals (track 7)
- Daddy Cool - vocals (track 9)
- Dawnmonique - vocals (track 10)
- Mike Holmes - vocals (track 11)
- Arturo Molina Jr. - vocals (track 14)
- Brian Gardner - mastering
- Tom Coyne - mastering
- Donovan Smith - mixing, recording
- Mark Paladino - mixing, recording
- Randal "Lodown" Harris - assistant engineer
- Julio Gonzalez - producer (track 14)
- Tony Gonzales - producer (track 14)
- Ian Steaman - artwork direction
- John Carr - illustrations
- Dean Karr - photography

== Charts ==
Album - Billboard (United States)

Year	Chart	Position
1996	The Billboard 200	80
1996	Top R&B/Hip-Hop Albums	16

Singles - Billboard (United States)

Year	Single	Chart	Position
1996	"100 Spokes"	Hot R&B/Hip-Hop Singles & Tracks	81
1996	"100 Spokes"	Hot Rap Singles	24
