= Executive Decisions =

Studio album by Big Hutch
- Released: June 29, 1999
- Recorded: 1998–1999
- Genre: West Coast hip hop; G-funk; gangsta rap
- Length: 59:10
- Label: Street Solid Records
- Producer: Big Mil; Big Hutch; Aaron; Tha Chill; S.O.C.; DJ Silk

Big Hutch chronology
Executive Decisions (1999)	Live from the Ghetto (2004)

Executive Decisions is the debut solo album by American rapper and producer Big Hutch, who also known as Cold 187um of Pomona-based hip hop group Above the Law. It was released on June 29, 1999, via Street Solid Records. The sixteen track full-length album featured guest appearances from Xzibit, Saafir, KM.G, Tha Chill, Safecracka, Ha-Ha L.O.C., Young Ten, Hazmad, and Boom Bam.

The song "Gangsta Shit" was later featured in the 2001 film Gang Tapes.

== Critical response ==
Professional ratings
Review scores
Source	Rating
AllMusic	3/5 stars

Alex Henderson of AllMusic wrote:

So Hutch's solo debut isn't groundbreaking, but even so, the MC is clever and entertaining enough to hold your attention. Dark, twisted humor was always one of Hutch's strong points, and there's no shortage of it on Executive Decisions -- much like Martin Scorsese's Goodfellas or Quentin Tarantino's Pulp Fiction, this CD is amusing and disturbing at the same time. And musically, Executive Decisions is easy to admire.

== Track listing ==
No.	Title	Producer(s)	Length
1.	"Intro"	DJ Silk	2:43
2.	"Lost Angels (L.A. L.A.)"	Big Hutch; Big Mil	2:47
3.	"Girl Next Door"	Big Mil	3:53
4.	"My Life" (featuring Boom Bam & Ha-Ha L.O.C.)	S.O.C.	3:01
5.	"Ways 2 Come Up" (featuring KM.G & Tha Chill)	Tha Chill	4:06
6.	"2 Killas" (featuring Xzibit & KM.G)	Big Hutch	3:41
7.	"Velvet Lifestyle (Prelude)"	Aaron	1:03
8.	"Gangsta Shit" (featuring Safecracka)	Big Mil	3:11
9.	"Elevate"	Big Mil; Big Hutch (co.)	4:16
10.	"Bubonic Plague"	Big Hutch	5:39
11.	"Do You Know?" (featuring Boom Bam & Young Ten)	Big Mil	3:47
12.	"Playas, Gangstas, Ballers" (featuring Saafir)	Big Mil	5:53
13.	"True Lies"	Big Hutch; Big Mil	3:17
14.	"Playa Hater" (featuring Hazmad)	Big Hutch	4:03
15.	"Velvet Lifestyle" (featuring KM.G & Boom Bam)	Aaron	3:26
16.	"Just Another Day" (Boom Bam)	MannyMusic	4:24
Total length:			59:10

== Personnel ==
- Gregory Fernan Hutchinson - main artist, producer (tracks 2, 6, 10, 13–14), co-producer (track 9), mixing (tracks 2, 10, 11, 14), recording (tracks 4, 10, 11)
- Big Mil - producer (tracks 2–3, 8–9, 11–13), mixing (tracks 3, 8–9, 11, 12, 13), recording (tracks 2, 4, 6, 8–9, 11, 12–13)
- Tim House - recording (tracks 1, 4, 6, 11, 14)
- Aaron - producer (tracks 7, 15), mixing & recording (tracks 7. 15)
- Russell Brown - producer (track 1), mixing (track 6)
- Vernon Johnson - featured artist & producer (track 5), mixing & recording (track 5)
- The S.O.C. - mixing & producer (track 4)
- Nick - mixing & recording (track 5)
- Kathy Longinaker - photography
- Ken Hollis - photography
- Boom Bam - featured artist (tracks 4, 7, 11, 15)
- Kevin Michael Gulley - featured artist (track 5–6, 15)
- Ha-Ha L.O.C. - featured artist (track 4)
- Alvin Nathaniel Joiner - featured artist (track 6)
- Safecracka - featured artist (track 8)
- Young Ten - featured artist (track 11)
- Reggie Gibson - featured artist (track 12)
- Hazmad - featured artist (track 14)
