= Black Mafia Life =

Studio album by Above the Law
- Released: February 2, 1993
- Recorded: 1991–1992
- Studios: The Edge Recording Studios (Torrance, CA); Audio Achievement (Torrance, CA)
- Genres: West Coast hip hop, gangsta rap, G-funk
- Length: 71:23
- Labels: Ruthless; Giant; Reprise
- Producers: Eazy-E (exec.); Above the Law

Above the Law chronology
Vocally Pimpin' (1991)	Black Mafia Life (1993)	Uncle Sam's Curse (1994)

Singles from Black Mafia Life
- 1. "Call It What U Want" Released: April 23, 1992; 2. "V.S.O.P." Released: November 29, 1992

Professional ratings
Review scores
Source	Rating
Allmusic	4/5 stars
Rolling Stone	4.5/5 stars

Black Mafia Life is the second studio album by American hip hop group Above the Law. It was released on February 2, 1993, via Ruthless Records. This album is what would be considered the blueprint of the G-Funk sound similar to Dr Dre's The Chronic (1992). The album was recorded in 1991 into 1992 but was held back due to legal issues with Epic and Dr. Dre's departure from Ruthless Records. As on the group's previous works, Livin' Like Hustlers (1990) and Vocally Pimpin' (1991), this album's audio production was mostly handled by A.T.L. themselves, but this one excluded any contributions from Lay Law. It featured guest appearances from Kokane, Eazy-E, 2Pac, MC Ren, and Money-B. Above the Law member Go Mack left the group after the release of this album due to a confrontation and financial disputes with Eazy-E.

Black Mafia Life peaked at number six on the Top R&B/Hip-Hop Albums chart and number 37 on the US Billboard 200. Its lead single "V.S.O.P." peaked at number nine on the Hot Rap Singles chart and number 97 on the Hot R&B/Hip-Hop Singles & Tracks. In 2022, Rolling Stone placed it at number 167 on their list of the 200 Greatest Hip-Hop Albums of All Time.

== Track listing ==
All tracks produced by Above The Law

No.	Title	Length
1.	"Black Triangle"	1:50
2.	"Never Missin' a Beat"	6:58
3.	"Why Must I Feel Like That?"	4:08
4.	"Commin' Up"	5:21
5.	"Pimpology 101"	4:04
6.	"Call It What U Want" (featuring 2Pac and Money-B)	4:32
7.	"Harda U R tha Doppa U Faal"	4:49
8.	"Game Wreck-Oniz-Iz Game" (featuring Eazy-E and Kokane)	5:12
9.	"Pimp Clinic"	6:20
10.	"V.S.O.P."	4:49
11.	"Process of Elimination (Untouchakickamurdaqtion)" (featuring M.C. Ren)	5:56
12.	"G's & Macaronies"	4:04
13.	"G-rupies Best Friend" (featuring Kokane)	5:30
14.	"Mee vs. My Ego"	5:20
15.	"Outro"	2:21
Total length:		1:11:22

Notes

- Track 2 contents elements from "(Not Just) Knee Deep" by Funkadelic (1979) and "Eulogy and Light" by Funkadelic (1970)
- Track 3 contents elements from "Can Move You (If You Let Me)" by Parliament (1974), "Atomic Dog" by George Clinton (1982) and "Back to Life (Club Mix)" by Soul II Soul (1989)
- Track 4 contents elements from "Synthetic Substitution" by Melvin Bliss (1973)
- Track 5 contents elements from "Introducing The Players" by Ohio Players (1975)
- Track 6 contents elements from "Freak Of The Week" by Funkadelic (1979) and "4 The Funk Of It" by Above The Law (1991)
- Track 7 contents elements from "Colour Me Funky" by Parliament (1979), "Bring The Noise" by Public Enemy (1987), "Wino & Junkie" by Richard Pryor (1974), "Scenario (Remix)" by A Tribe Called Quest & Leaders of the New School (1992) and "Let's Have Some Fun" by Bar-Kays (1977)
- Track 8 contents elements from "On The Floor" by Fatback Band (1982)
- Track 9 contents elements from "Fat Cat" by Bootsy Collins (1980), "Mothership Connection (Star Child)" by Parliament (1975), "Good Old Music" by Funkadelic (1970), "Heaven And Hell Is On Earth" by 20th Century Steel Band (1975) and "Niggers Are Scared Of Revolution" by The Last Poets (1970)
- Track 10 contents elements from "I Can't Go for That (No Can Do)" by Hall & Oates (1981), "Backstrokin'" by Fatback Band (1980), "Cutie Pie" by One Way (1982), "Genius of Love" by Tom Tom Club (1981) and "The Bertha Butt Boogie" by The Jimmy Castor Bunch (1974)
- Track 11 contents elements from "Do the Funky Penguin (Part 2)" by Rufus Thomas (1971), "Atomic Dog (Extended Version)" by George Clinton (1982), "You're a Customer" by EPMD (1988) and "Another Execution" by Above the Law (1990)
- Track 12 contents elements from "Bon Bon Vie (Gimme the Good Life)" by T.S. Monk (1980)
- Track 13 contents elements from "Housequake" by Prince (1987) and "Keep on Movin'" by Soul II Soul (1989)
- Track 14 contents elements from "Heartbeat" by Taana Gardner (1981) and "Gigolo" by Fatback Band (1981)

== Personnel ==
- Gregory Fernan Hutchinson — producer, scratches, keyboards, mixing
- Kevin Michael Gulley — co-producer, writer
- Arthur Lee Goodman III — co-producer, scratches
- Anthony Stewart — co-producer, scratches
- Eric Wright — guest vocals (track 8), executive producer
- Jerry Long Jr. — guest vocals (tracks 2, 8, 13)
- Tupac Shakur — guest vocals (track 6)
- Ronald Brooks — guest vocals (track 6)
- Lorenzo Patterson — guest vocals (track 11)
- Brian Gardner — mastering
- Donovan Smith — mixing
- Mark Paladino — mixing
- Michael Sims — guitar
- B-Laid Back Edwards — keyboards
- David Elliot — scratches
- D.J. Sno — scratches
- Poet H.B. — scratches (track 10)
- Mary Ann Dibs — art direction, design
- Julio Estrada — photography
- Mark Machado — artwork
- Digital Underground — backing vocals
- Tha Pimp Clinic — backing vocals
- Tha New Funkateers — backing vocals

== Chart positions ==
Billboard Music Charts album

- Billboard 200 (#37)
- Top R&B/Hip-Hop Albums (#6)

Billboard Music Charts singles

- "V.S.O.P." (Hot Rap Singles) (#9)
- "V.S.O.P." (Hot R&B/Hip-Hop Singles & Tracks) (#97)
