= Fresh Out the Pen =

Studio album by Cold 187um
- Released: August 5, 2008
- Recorded: 2008
- Genre: Gangsta rap
- Length: 1:13:45
- Label: RBC Records
- Producer: Cold 187um (also exec.); Royal Crown; Tony "Touch" Isaac

Cold 187um chronology
Live from the Ghetto (2004)	Fresh Out the Pen (2008)	Only God Can Judge Me (2011)

Fresh Out the Pen is the third solo album by American rapper and producer Cold 187um of Pomona-based hip hop group Above the Law. It was released on August 5, 2008, under RBC Records under the 'Cold187um' name after releasing two previous albums as Big Hutch. The album's title refers to Cold's release from prison following a 105-week sentence for drug trafficking.

Audio production of this record was handled by himself, Royal Krown and Tony 'Touch' Issac, and featured guest appearances from Hazmad and Royal Krown.

== Track listing ==
No.	Title	Length
1.	"Intro"	2:15
2.	"So Real"	2:57
3.	"Takeover"	0:34
4.	"Preach"	3:33
5.	"Turmoil in the Ghetto"	5:34
6.	"Dope Fean"	0:25
7.	"Get Your Weight Up" (featuring Hazmad)	4:14
8.	"Bizniz Never Personal"	4:32
9.	"Convict Love"	1:55
10.	"Fresh Out"	4:57
11.	"Gangstaz in Stilettos"	4:51
12.	"Bitch"	5:20
13.	"Deep Throat"	4:50
14.	"Hollywood"	4:11
15.	"Hustlers Cry" (featuring Royal Krown)	4:36
16.	"Aklikaniga"	4:41
17.	"May the Force Be with You"	4:15
18.	"187 Reloaded"	4:26
19.	"America X"	5:40
Total length:		1:13:45

Note

- "May The Force Be With You" contains elements from "The Imperial March (Darth Vader's Theme)" by John Williams (1980) and "May The Force Be With You" from Star Wars Episode IV: A New Hope (1977)

== Personnel ==
- Gregory Fernan Hutchinson - main artist, executive producer, producer (tracks 1, 3, 5–13, 18–19), lyrics (tracks 1–2, 4–5, 7–19)
- Royal Krown - featured artist (track 15), producer (tracks 14–17)
- Hazmad - featured artist (track 7), lyrics (tracks 7, 14, 16)
- Tony 'Touch' Issac - producer (tracks 2, 4)
