= Black Superman =

Black Superman may refer to:

== People ==
- Ahmed Johnson (born 1963), American wrestler and football player
- Billy Ray Bates (born 1956), American professional basketball player

== Entertainment ==
- Abar, the First Black Superman, a 1977 blaxploitation film
- Black Superman (Above the Law song), 1994
- "Black Superman (Muhammad Ali)", a song by Johnny Wakelin
- Calvin Ellis, an alternative, multi-racial version of Superman
