= Call It What You Want =

Call It What You Want may refer to:

- "Call It What You Want" (New Kids on the Block song), 1991
- "Call It What You Want" (Foster the People song), 2011
- "Call It What You Want" (Taylor Swift song), 2017
- "Call It What U Want", a 1992 song by Above the Law
- "Call It What You Want", a 1992 song by Credit to the Nation
- "Call It What You Want", a song by Tesla from the album Psychotic Supper, 1991
- Call It What You Want, an album by LA Symphony
