= Live from the Ghetto =

Studio album by Big Hutch
- Released: June 8, 2004
- Recorded: 2003–2004
- Studio: Planet West Recording Studios (Los Angeles); Paramount Recording Studio (Hollywood); Beat Brokers Studio (Hollywood)
- Genre: G-funk; gangsta rap
- Length: 54:29
- Label: Activate
- Producer: Big Hutch (also exec.); Mark Sparks; Curtis Mayfield; Cruch

Big Hutch chronology
Executive Decisions (1999)	Live from the Ghetto (2004)	Fresh Out the Pen (2008)

Live from the Ghetto is the sophomore solo album by American rapper and producer Big Hutch, who also known as Cold 187um of Pomona-based hip hop group Above the Law. It was released on June 8, 2004, via Activate Entertainment. The seventeen track full-length album featured guest appearances from Kokane, KM.G, Vietnam, Geno, Hazmad, and Curtis Mayfield.

== Critical response ==
Professional ratings
Review scores
Source	Rating
Allmusic	3.5/5 stars

Alex Henderson of Allmusic wrote:

Lyrically, Hutch's second solo album, Live From the Ghetto, doesn't break any new ground for the veteran rapper, who continues to rhyme about the dangers of life in the 'hood and the abundance of players, ballers, hustlers, thugs, and hardheads one is likely to encounter on the tough streets of South Central L.A. But by adjusting his flow and his production style to appeal to 2004 tastes, Hutch pretty much manages to avoid sounding dated. Hutch isn't rapping or producing exactly like he did back in 1990, and yet many of the things that make the Southern Californian who he is haven't changed -- not his subject matter, and not his love of soulful hooks and melodies. Hutch, like fellow Californians Too Short and Dr. Dre, has long had a passion for '70s soul and funk -- and that passion makes for some enjoyably infectious grooves whether he is sampling the late Curtis Mayfield on "Give Me Yo Love" or making some War-like moves on "Ghetto Love." Live From the Ghetto is unlikely to convert anyone who isn't already a Hutch fan, but it's a respectable outing that underscores the MC's longevity in the thugged-out gangsta rap game.

== Track listing ==
No.	Title	Length
1.	"Intro: Do It Again"	4:04
2.	"Still That Nigga"	3:52
3.	"Ghetto Love"	3:57
4.	"Lyrical Murda"	4:56
5.	"Ghetto Platinum" (featuring Hazmad & KM.G)	3:57
6.	"Born Hustla"	3:11
7.	"Skit"	0:26
8.	"Boo"	4:51
9.	"Give Me Yo Love" (featuring Curtis Mayfield)	4:15
10.	"Gutta" (featuring KM.G & Kokane)	4:02
11.	"Skit"	0:53
12.	"I Used to Respect You" (featuring Vietnam)	4:41
13.	"Major Dic" (featuring Geno)	2:59
14.	"Skit"	0:19
15.	"Ride Like a Gangsta"	3:34
16.	"Skit"	0:56
17.	"State of Emergency"	3:37
Total length:		54:29

Note

- Song "Lyrical Murda" contains samples from "I Want'a Do Something Freaky to You" by Leon Haywood (1975)

== Personnel ==
- Gregory Fernan Hutchinson - main artist, bass, keyboards, mixing, executive producer, producer (tracks 1–2, 4–6, 8–10, 12, 17)
- Curtis Mayfield - featured artist & producer (track 9)
- Kevin Michael Gulley - featured artist (tracks 5, 10)
- Jerry Long Jr. - featured artist (track 10)
- Hazmad - featured artist (track 5)
- Vietnam - featured artist (track 12)
- Geno - featured artist (track 13)
- Mark Sparks - bass, keyboards, producer (tracks 2–3, 12–13, 15)
- Cruch - producer (track 12)
- Stan "The Guitar" Man - guitar
- Julio Gonzalez - mixing
- Big Doug - mixing
