= Murder Rap =

Single by Above the Law

from the album Livin' Like Hustlers
- Released: February 8, 1990
- Recorded: 1989
- Genre: West Coast hip-hop; gangsta rap; G-funk; hardcore hip-hop
- Length: 4:14
- Label: Ruthless; Epic
- Songwriters: Cold 187um; Dr. Dre; Go Mack; Laylaw; Total Kaos
- Producers: Dr. Dre; Eazy-E; Laylaw

Above the Law singles chronology
"Murder Rap" (1990)	"Untouchable" (1990)

Music video
- "Murder Rap" on YouTube

"Murder Rap" is a song by American gangsta rap group Above the Law, released as a single on February 8, 1990. It was written by Cold 187um, Dr. Dre, Go Mack, Laylaw and Total Kaos.

== Music and lyrics ==
The music of "Murder Rap", as produced by Dr. Dre, consists of an ominous siren sound, and backwards, looped drum beats. Allmusic's Alex Henderson says that the song's lyrics "let listeners know exactly what life in South Central was like."

== Reception ==
In his Allmusic review, Alex Henderson wrote that "The imaginative Dre's input as a producer is consistently beneficial", saying that the music "comes alive" as a result of Dr. Dre's input. Regarding Above the Law's lyrical content, Henderson wrote, "the Angelenos had some freshness." A review of the song by Frank Owen in Spin praised Dr. Dre's production, saying that the producer "has a remarkable talent for making noise funky, and he shows it to great effect". However, Owen criticized Above the Law as lyricists, writing, "they present this hardcore life without any of the dandy charm that Big Daddy Kane or Oran 'Juice' Jones bring to it." Vibe praised the song as "a breathtaking assembly", complimenting the music and Cold 187um's raps.

== Legacy ==
In 1998, the song was included on the compilation Ruthless Records Tenth Anniversary: Decade of Game. In 2002, Insane Clown Posse released a cover of the song on their album The Wraith: Shangri-La. This version of the song appeared as the B-side of ICP's single "Hell's Forecast". In 2004, the song was added in the game Grand Theft Auto: San Andreas, which is used for Radio Los Santos station. In 2006, ICP's cover was remixed for The Wraith: Remix Albums by Filthee Immigrants. Insane Clown Posse's cover of the song led to a professional relationship between ICP and Cold 187 um, and he later signed to Psychopathic Records as a solo rapper.

== Track listing ==
1. "Murder Rap"
2. "Murder Rap" (Instrumental)
3. "Another Execution"
4. "Another Execution" (Instrumental)
