= Call It What U Want =

Single by Above the Law featuring 2Pac and Money-B

from the album Black Mafia Life
- B-side: "Call It What You Want (Instrumental)"
- Released: April 23, 1992
- Recorded: 1992
- Genre: Hip-hop, G-funk
- Length: 4:32
- Label: Ruthless; Giant
- Songwriters: Tupac Shakur, Money B, Above the Law
- Producer: Cold 187um

Above the Law singles chronology
"4 the Funk of It" (1991)	"Call It What U Want" (1992)	"V.S.O.P" (1992)

2Pac singles chronology
"If My Homie Calls" (1991)	"Call It What U Want" (1992)	"Holler If Ya Hear Me" (1993)

Music video
- "Call It What U Want" on YouTube

"Call It What U Want" is the second and final single by Above the Law from their second album Black Mafia Life. It features 2Pac and Money-B. The music video for the single features cameos from Big Stretch, Treach, Eazy-E, and MC Ren.

== Music video ==
The music video features cameos by Eazy-E, MC Ren, Treach, and Big Stretch.

== Charts ==
Chart (1993)	Peak position
U.S. Billboard Bubbling Under R&B/Hip-Hop Songs	23
