= Forever: Rich Thugs, Book One =

Studio album by Above the Law
- Released: October 26, 1999
- Recorded: 1999
- Genre: West Coast hip hop
- Length: 53:33
- Label: Street Solid Records Inc.
- Producer: Above the Law (also exec.); Big Mil; Tha Chill; DJ Silk; Nick

Above the Law chronology
Legends (1998)	Forever: Rich Thugs, Book One (1999)	Sex, Money & Music (2009)

Forever: Rich Thugs, Book One is the sixth studio album by American hip hop group Above the Law. It was released on October 26, 1999, for Street Solid Records.

On this album, Cold 187um appeared as Big Hutch and KM.G as Chicken Vin. The album featured guest appearances from Safecracka, Young Ten, and Ha-Ha L.O.C., and its audio production was handled by Big Mil, Tha Chill, DJ Silk, Nick, and A.T.L. themselves.

Professional ratings
Review scores
Source	Rating
Allmusic	3/5 stars

== Track listing ==
No.	Title	Writer(s)	Producer(s)	Length
1.	"Rich Thugs" (Intro)	G. Hutchinson; M. McDonald	Big Mil	1:47
2.	"Black Mob" (featuring Safecracka)	K. Gulley; G. Hutchinson	DJ Silk	4:36
3.	"Marvin"	A. Stewart; K. Gulley; G. Hutchinson; M. Gaye	Big Hutch	4:11
4.	"Three Strikes"			0:33
5.	"Recycle the Black Dollar"	K. Gulley; G. Hutchinson	Big Hutch	3:23
6.	"Respect" (featuring Young Ten)	K. Gulley; G. Hutchinson; J. Taylor	Tha Chill; Above The Law	4:20
7.	"Pawns"	K. Gulley; G. Hutchinson	Nick; Above The Law (co.)	4:02
8.	"Thug in Your Life"	K. Gulley; G. Hutchinson; M. McDonald	Big Mil	5:14
9.	"Smoke"	K. Gulley; G. Hutchinson	Above The Law; Tha Chill	4:14
10.	"Rich Thugs Movement" (Interlude)			2:34
11.	"A.T.L. True"	K. Gulley; G. Hutchinson; M. McDonald	Big Mil; Above The Law (co.)	4:31
12.	"It Ain't Where You From"	K. Gulley; G. Hutchinson	Above the Law	4:00
13.	"The Money" (Interlude)			0:32
14.	"Sax"	K. Gulley; G. Hutchinson; M. McDonald	Big Mil	4:07
15.	"P.I.M.P." (featuring Ha-Ha L.O.C., Safecracka & Young Ten)	K. Gulley; G. Hutchinson; M. McDonald; J. Taylor	Big Mil; Big Hutch (co.)	5:29
Total length:				53:33

== Personnel ==
- Gregory Fernan Hutchinson - producer (tracks 3, 5–6, 9, 12), co-producer (6–7, 11–12, 15), executive producer, mixing (tracks 1, 3, 5, 11–12, 15)
- Kevin Michael Gulley - producer (track 9), co-producer (tracks 6–7, 11–12), executive producer, mixing (tracks 2, 6–7)
- Anthony Stewart - producer (track 9), co-producer (tracks 6–7, 11–12), executive producer, mixing (tracks 2, 6–7)
- Big Mil - producer (tracks 1, 8, 11, 14–15), mixing (tracks 1, 8–9, 11, 14–15), recording (tracks 8–9, 11)
- Vernon Johnson - producer (tracks 6, 9), mixing & additional vocals (track 6)
- Russell Brown - producer & mixing (track 2)
- Nick - producer & mixing (track 7)
- Tim House - mixing (tracks 8–9), recording (tracks 1, 3, 5, 8–9, 11–12, 14–15), A&R direction
- Jay Gonzalez - mixing (track 11), recording (tracks 1–2)
- Kathy Longinaker - photography
- Imix Design - art direction
- Young Ten - guest vocals (tracks 2, 6, 15)
- Safecracka - guest vocals (tracks 2, 15)
- Boom Bam - guest vocals (track 2, 14)
- Ha-Ha L.O.C. - guest vocals (track 15)
