= Vocally Pimpin' =

EP by Above the Law
- Released: July 16, 1991
- Recorded: 1990–1991
- Genre: West Coast hip-hop; G-funk
- Length: 38:23
- Label: Ruthless; Epic
- Producer: Eazy-E (exec.); Above The Law

Above the Law chronology
Livin' Like Hustlers (1990)	Vocally Pimpin' (1991)	Black Mafia Life (1993)

Singles from Vocally Pimpin'
- 1. "4 The Funk Of It" Released: 1991

Professional ratings
Review scores
Source	Rating
Allmusic	3/5 stars

Vocally Pimpin' is the debut extended play by American hip hop group Above the Law. It was released on July 16, 1991 via Ruthless Records. The first five songs on this nine track record are newly recorded material, while the rest four are remixes or edited versions of their previously released material. The album peaked at number 120 on the US Billboard 200 and number 37 on the Top R&B/Hip-Hop Albums charts.

== Track listing ==
No.	Title	Writer(s)	Length
1.	"Playlude"	A. Stewart; A. Goodman; K. Gulley; L. Goodman; G. Hutchinson	2:24
2.	"Playin' Your Game"	A. Goodman; K. Gulley; L. Goodman; G. Hutchinson	4:59
3.	"Dose Of The Mega Flex"	K. Gulley; G. Hutchinson	4:25
4.	"4 The Funk Of It" (featuring Kokane)	A. Goodman; L. Goodman; G. Hutchinson; J. Long	5:02
5.	"Wicked"	G. Hutchinson; J. Long	6:12
6.	"Livin' Like Hustlers (G-Mixx)"	K. Gulley; G. Hutchinson; B. Cosby; Q. Jones	5:11
7.	"4 The Funk Of It (Radio Edit)"	A. Goodman; L. Goodman; G. Hutchinson	3:39
8.	"B.M.L. (Commercial)"	A. Stewart; A. Goodman; K. Gulley; G. Hutchinson	2:36
9.	"4 The Funk Of It (Pimpsextramental)"	A. Goodman; L. Goodman; G. Hutchinson	3:55
Total length:			38:23

Sample credits

- "Playlude" contains elements of "Right On For The Darkness" by Curtis Mayfield (1973)
- "Playin' Your Game" contains elements of "Let Me Love You" by Michael Henderson (1977), "The Sponge" by Bob James & Earl Klugh (1992), "Playing Your Game, Baby" by Barry White (1977), "Back to Life (Acapella)" by Soul II Soul (1989)
- "Dose Of The Mega Flex" contains elements of "Genius of Love" by Tom Tom Club (1981)
- "4 The Funk Of It" contains elements of "One Nation Under A Groove" by Funkadelic (1978) and "Atomic Dog" by George Clinton (1982)
- "Wicked" contains elements of "Ode to Billie Joe" by Lou Donaldson (1967) and "Do The Funky Penguin (Part 2)" by Rufus Thomas (1971)
- "Livin' Like Hustlers (G-Mixx)" contains elements of "The Big Beat" by Billy Squier (1980) and "Johnny The Fox Meets Jimmy The Weed" by Thin Lizzy (1976)
- "B.M.L. (Commercial)" contains elements of "Funky Worm" by Ohio Players (1972)

== Personnel ==
adapted from Discogs

- Gregory Fernan Hutchinson – producer, mixing, keyboards
- Kevin Michael Gulley – co-producer
- Arthur Lee Goodman III – co-producer
- Larry Goodman – co-producer
- Anthony Stewart – co-producer
- Eric Wright – executive producer
- Stan "The Guitar" Man – bass, guitar
- B-Laid Back Edwards – keyboards
- Jerry Long Jr. – guest vocals (track 5)
- David Dyson – backing vocals
- Mark Paladino – engineer

== Chart positions ==
Billboard Music Charts album

- Billboard 200 (#120)
- Top R&B/Hip-Hop Albums (#37)

Billboard Music Charts singles

- "4 The Funk of It" (Hot Rap Singles) (#21)
