= Livin' in a Hoe House =

Studio album by H.W.A.
- Released: October 2, 1990
- Recorded: 1989–1990
- Genres: West Coast hip hop; G-funk; hardcore hip hop; dirty rap
- Length: 55:44
- Label: Drive-By Records
- Producers: Sugar Daddy T. (exec.); Ronnie Vann; Dangerous "D"

H.W.A. chronology
Livin' in a Hoe House (1990)	Az Much Ass Azz U Want (1994)

Livin' in a Hoe House is the only studio album by American female rap group H.W.A. The album was released in 1990 via Drive-By Records and was produced by Dangerous D and Ronnie Vann. The record was mildly successful, reaching #38 on the Top R&B/Hip-Hop Albums chart. No singles made it to the Billboard charts.

The song "Eat This" was later sampled in "Black Widow Pt. 2" as performed by RZA and Ol' Dirty Bastard from the album Digital Bullet (2001).

Professional ratings
Review scores
Source	Rating
Allmusic	3/5 stars
The Source	1.5/5 stars

== Track listing ==
No.	Title	Length
1.	"To Live or Die"	4:39
2.	"Funk Me"	3:53
3.	"Eat This"	4:35
4.	"Livin' in a Hoe House"	3:52
5.	"1-900-BITCHES"	4:16
6.	"Freaky Daze"	3:49
7.	"Gangstrology"	4:56
8.	"Tight"	4:15
9.	"Trick Is Trick"	3:32
10.	"The Conflict"	4:23
11.	"Nasty"	4:08
12.	"Baller Baller"	4:35
13.	"Little Dick"	4:55
Total length:		55:44

Samples

- "Funk Me" sampled
  - "Raid" by Lakeside (1983)
  - "Pee-Wee's Dance" by Joeski Love (1986)
  - "Everlasting Bass" by Rodney-O & Joe Cooley (1988)
- "Eat This" sampled
  - "Sir Nose D'Voidoffunk" by Parliament (1977)
  - "Pussy Ain't Nothin'" by Schoolly D (1989)
- "Livin' in a Hoe house" sampled
  - "Funky Drummer" by James Brown (1970)
  - "Funky President (People It's Bad)" by James Brown (1974)
- "Freaky Daze" sampled
  - "Freaky Tales" by Too Short (1987)
  - "Change the Beat (Female Version)" by Beside (1982)
- "Gangstrology" sampled
  - "I'm Gonna Get You" by Sir Joe Quarterman & Free Soul (1974)
  - "Funky Drummer" by James Brown (1970)
  - "Change the Beat (Female Version)" by Beside (1982)
  - "Funky President (People It's Bad)" by James Brown (1974)
  - "Hobo Scratch" by Malcolm McLaren and World's Famous Supreme Team (1983)
- "Trick Is a Trick" sampled
  - "Anti Love Song" by Betty Davis (1973)
  - "Funky Drummer" by James Brown (1970)
- "The Conflict" sampled
  - "School Boy Crush" by Average White Band (1975)
  - "It's a New Day" by Skull Snaps (1973)
  - "Get Up Offa That Thing" by James Brown (1976)
- "Nasty" sampled
  - "(Nothing Serious) Just Buggin'" by Whistle (1986)

== Personnel ==
- Kim "Baby Girl" Kenner - vocals, rapping
- Tanya "Jazzy" Kenner - vocals, rapping
- Dion "Diva" Devoux - vocals, rapping
- Beth Chaplin - background vocals
- Budd Ford - background vocals
- Cheri Ford - background vocals
- Lenore Bangs - background vocals
- Livio Harris - background vocals
- Robin Warnecke - producer, drum programming
- Ronald Dean Vann - producer
- James Cedrick Magee - keyboards, drum programming
- Damon Thomas - keyboards, drum programming
- Jason Hess - keyboards, drum programming
- Nutra-Sweet - keyboards, drum programming
- Muhammad Azam Zia - mixing
- Dave Sheidene - mixing, engineering
- Anne Catalino - engineering
- Muhammad Azam Zia - engineering
- Sugar Daddy T. - executive producer
- Pete Lascurain - project & production coordinator
- Ronnie Richardson - project coordinator & marketing
- Paula Kuhn - project coordinator
- Mark Hovater - photography
- Gayle Elliot - photography
