= Az Much Ass Azz U Want =

EP by H.W.A.
- Released: February 22, 1994
- Recorded: 1993–1994
- Studio: Eazy E Studies
- Genres: West Coast hip hop; hardcore hip hop; pornocore
- Length: 22:53
- Labels: Ruthless Records; Relativity Records
- Producers: Eazy-E (exec.); Mista Choc Rhythm D; DJ Yella

H.W.A. chronology
Livin' in a Hoe House (1990)	Az Much Ass Azz U Want (1994)

Singles from Az Much Ass Azz U Want
- 1. "All That (Juzt A Little Action)" Released: 1993

Az Much Ass Azz U Want is one of two extended play albums by American female rap group H.W.A. The EP was released on February 22, 1994, under Ruthless Records and was produced by Cold 187um, Mista Choc, DJ Yella and Rhythum D, with executive production by Eazy-E. Due to the record being both a critical and commercial failure, only making it to #71 on the Top R&B/Hip-Hop Albums and #33 on the Top Heatseekers album charts, the group disbanded later the same year. One single was released, "All That (Juzt A Little Action)", but it did not make it on any album charts. The music video received heavy airplay and featured an appearance by Eazy-E.

== Track listing ==
Adapted from Discogs

No.	Title	Writer(s)	Producer(s)	Length
1.	"True Hoez"	K. Kenner; V. Edwards; M. Johnson	Chocolate	1:14
2.	"All That (Juzt A Little Action)"	K. Kenner; D. Weldon; B.O.X.	Rhythm D	4:09
3.	"Body Snatcherz"	K. Kenner; M. Johnson; B.O.X.	Chocolate (co.)	3:58
4.	"Hoe I Am"	K. Kenner; M. Johnson	Cold 187um	3:24
5.	"High Timez"	K. Kenner; M. Johnson; A. Carraby; B.O.X.	DJ Yella; Chocolate	3:24
6.	"Az Much Ass Azz U Want"	K. Kenner; M. Johnson	Chocolate	2:30
7.	"Great Tazte - Lezz Fillaz"	K. Kenner; V. Edwards; M. Johnson; B.O.X.	Chocolate	4:14
Total length:				22:53

Note

- "Hoe I Am" sampled "I'm A Ho" by Whodini (1986)

== Personnel ==
- Antoine Carraby - producer (track 5)
- Vince Edwards - songwriter (tracks 1, 7)
- Mario “Mista Choc”Johnson - producer (tracks 1, 5–7), co-producer (track 3)
- Kim Kenner - main performer
- Jerry Long Jr. - additional vocals (track 4)
- Mark Paladino - mixing (tracks 1, 3, 6)
- Donovan Smith - mixing (track 2)
- David Weldon - producer & mixing (track 2)
- Eric Wright - executive producer
- B.O.X. - songwriter (tracks 2–3, 5, 7)
