= Black Superman (Above the Law song) =

1994 single by Above the Law

Single by Above the Law

from the album Uncle Sam's Curse
- Released: June 28, 1994
- Genre: West Coast hip-hop; G-funk
- Length: 4:27
- Label: Ruthless; Relativity
- Songwriters: Cold 187um; KMG the Illustrator; Kokane
- Producer: Cold 187um

Above the Law singles chronology
"V.S.O.P" (1992)	"Black Superman" (1994)	"Kalifornia" (1995)

Music video
- "Black Superman'" on YouTube

"Black Superman" is a song by American hip hop group Above the Law, released on June 28, 1994 as the lead single from their third studio album Uncle Sam's Curse (1994). It was produced by Cold 187um, who wrote the song with KMG the Illustrator and Kokane.

== Background ==
In a 2014 interview with the Inland Valley Daily Bulletin, Big Hutch (formerly known as Cold 187um) stated that rapper Eazy-E selected the song to be a single:

He comes in and the last song we play was "Black Superman". After it goes off, he says that's the single. He never picked any of our singles. He said the reason why "Black Superman" is the single is it explains what the whole album is going to be about.

== Composition ==
The song opens with dialogue from the 1994 film Against the Wall, and is built on a reversed loop sampled from "Funky Worm" by Ohio Players. KMG the Illustrator performs the opening verse, after which an "ominous" answering machine message is heard. Lyrically, Cold 187um recounts his life of selling drugs as an adolescent to support his mother ("Uh, you really wanna know why I sold scum? / Because my mama to me comes number one").

== Critical reception ==
Pete Tosiello of LA Weekly regarded the song to be the "greatest triumph" from Uncle Sam's Curse, "perhaps Above the Law's finest moment on wax and an essential piece of the West Coast rap canon." Complex and The Ringer included the song in their respective lists of the 100 and 101 best L.A. rap songs.

== In popular culture ==
The song was featured in the miniseries The People v. O. J. Simpson: American Crime Story.

== Charts ==
Chart (1994)	Peak position
US Hot R&B/Hip Hop Songs (Billboard)	79
US Hot Rap Songs (Billboard)	24
