= Eyedollartree =

Studio album by Blood of Abraham
- Released: May 2, 2000
- Recorded: 1999–2000
- Genre: Alternative hip hop, conscious hip hop, hardcore hip hop, West Coast hip hop
- Label: Atomic Pop/MasterGrip
- Producer: Blood of Abraham; Motiv8 will.i.am Cyrus Melchor

Blood of Abraham chronology
Future Profits (1993)	Eyedollartree (2000)

Professional ratings
Review scores
Source	Rating
AllMusic	4/5 stars
The Des Moines Register	3/5 stars
RapReviews	8/10

Eyedollartree is the second album by the rap duo Blood of Abraham. It was released in 2000 via Atomic Pop and MasterGrip. The album was rereleased in 2005.

The album was accompanied by a DVD of a short film directed by the duo and Brian Beletic.

== Production ==
The album was produced by Blood of Abraham, will.i.am, Motiv8, and Cyrus Melchor. Kool Keith, Divine Styler, and will.i.am made guest appearances on some of the tracks.

== Critical reception ==
The A.V. Club called the album "superb," writing that it "surveys a bleak world riddled with disease, warped values, corruption, and constant surveillance, but not without a sturdy sense of humor and a winning pop-art playfulness." LA Weekly deemed it "a mixture of trippy, band-oriented backpack hip-hop with a few guitar-rock tunes thrown in, and at least three or four solid singles."

== Track listing ==
1. "Know The Half"- 3:47
2. "Only The Wise"- 4:38
3. "99¢ Lighter" feat. will.i.am - 3:48
4. "Paranoia Is Awareness"- 3:59
5. "Velvet Glove, Iron Fist"- 4:50
6. "-Tion"- 4:37
7. "Calling All Citizens" feat. will.i.am - 4:49
8. "Hurricane"- 3:48
9. "Rosetta Stone"- 3:40
10. "Giant Midgets"- 4:14
11. "Eyedollartree"- 5:09
12. "Dangerous Diseases"- 5:13
13. "Omegaton" feat. Kool Keith, Divine Styler - 4:20
