= Legends (Above the Law album) =

Studio album by Above the Law
- Released: February 24, 1998
- Recorded: 1997
- Studio: Audio Achievements (Torrance, CA); Echo Sound (California)
- Genre: West Coast hip hop
- Length: 1:04:35
- Label: Tommy Boy
- Producer: Above the Law (also exec.)

Above the Law chronology
Time Will Reveal (1996)	Legends (1998)	Forever: Rich Thugs, Book One (1999)

Professional ratings
Review scores
Source	Rating
AllMusic	2.5/5 stars
The Source	3.5/5 stars

Legends is the fifth studio album by American hip hop group Above the Law. It was released in 1998 via Tommy Boy Records. The record peaked at number 27 on the Top R&B/Hip-Hop Albums and number 142 on the Billboard 200.

Audio production of the entire album was handled by Cold 187um with co-production by KM.G and K-oss. The sixteen track record featured guest appearances from Ha-Ha L.O.C. of Pomona City Rydaz, Yukmouth, Jayo Felony, Young Ten, Madd Harv Dogg, and Big Rocc.

== Track listing ==
No.	Title	Writer(s)	Length
1.	"Intro "Floetry""	G. Hutchinson	2:43
2.	"X.O. wit Me" (featuring Jayo Felony)	K. Gulley; J. Savage; G. Hutchinson	4:39
3.	"Set Trippin'"	K. Gulley; G. Hutchinson	4:02
4.	"Promise Me"	A. Stewart; K. Gulley; G. Hutchinson	4:39
5.	"Be About Yo Bizniz" (featuring Ha-Ha L.O.C.)	K. Gulley; G. Hutchinson	3:17
6.	"Clinic Niggaz" (featuring Young Ten)	K. Gulley; G. Hutchinson	2:46
7.	"Soliciting"	K. Gulley; G. Hutchinson	3:57
8.	"Deep az the Root"	A. Stewart; K. Gulley; G. Hutchinson	5:39
9.	"The Streets"	K. Gulley; G. Hutchinson	4:19
10.	"Summer Days"	A. Stewart; K. Gulley; G. Hutchinson	4:31
11.	"L.A. Vibe"	K. Gulley; G. Hutchinson	2:35
12.	"Worldwide"	K. Gulley; G. Hutchinson	3:49
13.	"Karma" (featuring Madd Harv Dawg)	K. Gulley; G. Hutchinson	3:53
14.	"Soul Searching" (featuring Yukmouth)	J. Ellis; K. Gulley; G. Hutchinson	4:44
15.	"Adventures Of..."	K. Gulley; G. Hutchinson	4:18
16.	"In God We Trust" (featuring Big Rocc)	J. Brown; K. Gulley; G. Hutchinson	4:41
Total length:			1:04:35

== Personnel ==
- Gregory Fernan Hutchinson - executive producer, producer, mixing (tracks 11–12, 15), keyboards
- Kevin Michael Gulley - executive producer, co-producer
- Anthony Stewart - executive producer, co-producer
- Donovan Smith - mixing & recording (tracks 1–10, 13–14, 16)
- Jay Gonzalez - recording (tracks 11–12, 15)
- Brian Gardner - mastering
- Michael Sims - guitar, bass
- Gary "Sugarfoot" Greenberg - drums
- Julie Griffin - backing vocals
- Traci Nelson - backing vocals
- Nicole Hithe - backing vocals (track 15)
- Ian Steaman - A&R
- Michael Miller - photography
- Dave Conrad - digital editing
- James Savage - featured artist (track 2)
- Jerold Ellis - featured artist (track 14)
- Jerry Brown - featured artist (track 16)
- Ha-Ha L.O.C. - featured artist (track 5)
- Young Ten - featured artist (track 6)
- Madd Harv Dogg - featured artist (track 13)
