= Future Profits =

Studio album by Blood of Abraham
- Released: 1993
- Recorded: 1992–1993
- Genre: Hip hop
- Label: Ruthless/Relativity
- Producer: Eazy-E (exec.), Epic Mazur, Bilal Bashir

Blood of Abraham chronology
Future Profits (1993)	Eyedollartree (2000)

Singles from Future Profits
- 1. "Stabbed by the Steeple" Released: 1993

Future Profits is the debut album by the American rap duo Blood of Abraham. It was produced by Eazy-E, Epic Mazur, and Bilal Bashir. The lyrics deal with Judaism, world religions, and race relations, among other topics. The duo supported the album with a North American tour. The first single was "Stabbed by the Steeple".

== Critical reception ==
Professional ratings
Review scores
Source	Rating
AllMusic	2.5/5 stars
Los Angeles Times	3/4 stars
RapReviews	6/10

Trouser Press determined that "what sets Future Profits apart is the provocative lyrical uses the unorthodox duo finds for religion, Ethiopian heritage and ethnic identity." The Los Angeles Times wrote that "a nimble mix of old school and new school beats supports a Zionist message paralleling hip-hop's standard Afrocentric rhetoric." Rolling Stone opined that "producers Bret 'Epic' Mazur and DJ Lett Loose try too hard to jump on the jazz bandwagon, the awkward rhythms and squealing horns dragging down the occasionally swinging verbal flow."

== Track listing ==
1. "Future Profits (Intro)"
2. "This Great Land Devours"
3. "Southern Comfort"
4. "Stick to Your Own Kind"
5. "That Ol' Dupree Shit"
6. "I'm Not the Man"
7. "Father of Many Nations"
8. "Devils Get No Dap"
9. "3-2-1 Contact"
10. "Stabbed by the Steeple"
11. "Another Nail in the Coffin"
12. "Life"
13. "Niggaz and Jewz (Some Say Kikes)" feat. Eazy-E, Will 1 X
14. "Loose Interpretation of the End (Outro)"
