= Supersonic (J. J. Fad song) =

Single by J.J. Fad

from the album Supersonic
- Released: April 18, 1988
- Recorded: 1987
- Genre: Hip hop, electro, Miami bass
- Length: 3:55
- Label: Dream Team; Ruthless; Atco
- Songwriters: Dania Birks; Juana Burns; Juanita Lee; Fatima Shaheed; Kim Nazel
- Producers: Dr. Dre; DJ Yella; Arabian Prince

J.J. Fad singles chronology
"Anotha Ho" (1987)	"Supersonic" (1988)	"Way Out" (1988)

Music video
- "Supersonic" on YouTube

"Supersonic" is a song by J. J. Fad from their debut album of the same name.

== Background ==
The first recording of "Supersonic" was released in 1987 by the original line-up of J.J. Fad as the B-side to "Anotha Ho" produced by Arabian Prince on Dream Team Records. The new line-up re-recorded and released "Supersonic" in April 1988 as a single; produced by Dr Dre, DJ Yella, and Arabian Prince and released on Ruthless Records, this version reached number 10 on the Billboard Hot Dance/Club Play Songs and number 22 on the Hot R&B/Hip-Hop Singles & Tracks chart. "Supersonic" stayed on the dance charts for eight weeks. The single was certified gold by RIAA, and also got nominated for a Grammy Award for Best Rap Performance in 1989, making them the first all-female rap group to be nominated for a Grammy award.

== Charts ==
Chart (1988)	Peak position
Canada Dance/Urban (RPM)	1
U.S. Billboard Hot 100	30
U.S. Billboard Hot Black Singles	22
U.S. Billboard Hot Dance/Club Play	10

=== Year-end charts ===
Chart (1988)	Position
Canada Dance/Urban (RPM)	9

== Samples and references in other songs ==
The song has been sampled and referenced by others in the music industry:

- Fergie in her song "Fergalicious", including parts of the beat and ways in which the song is sung. There has been much debate over whether or not this has been legal sampling, and a lawsuit was filed by former N.W.A. member Arabian Prince against Ruthless Records because he says the Black Eyed Peas did not provide them any royalties on the song. In a later interview with HipHopDX, Arabian Prince stated, “will.i.am did the right thing and the good thing by actually saying, ‘Okay, yeah, I got this from “Supersonic,” we’re gonna go ahead and get the publishing on this and pay royalties to me, whoever else and the girls.’ So that was a good thing.”
- In 2004, MF Doom sampled the beatboxing intro from the 1988 video for "Supersonic" in his song "Hoe Cakes" from his album Mm..Food.
- In 2006, Teriyaki Boyz referenced J.J. Fad and "Supersonic" in their single Tokyo Drift (Fast & Furious).
- In 2009, Beastie Boys reference J.J. Fad and "Supersonic" on their Grammy–nominated song "Too Many Rappers".
- In 2012, Killer Mike of Run the Jewels referenced J.J. Fad and "Supersonic" in his song "Go!" from his album R.A.P. Music.
- In 2013, Eminem referenced J. J. Fad and "Supersonic" in his single "Rap God".

== Certifications ==
Region	Certification	Certified units/sales
United States (RIAA)	Gold	500,000^{^}
^{^} Shipments figures based on certification alone.
