= Supersonic (J. J. Fad album) =

Studio album by J. J. Fad
- Released: June 15, 1988
- Recorded: 1987–1988
- Studio: Audio Achievements (Torrance, CA)
- Genre: Hip hop; electro
- Length: 32:34
- Label: Ruthless; Atco
- Producer: Dr. Dre; DJ Yella; Arabian Prince

J. J. Fad chronology
Supersonic (1988)	Not Just a Fad (1990)

Singles from Supersonic
- 1. "Supersonic" Released: June 1988; 2. "Way Out" Released: 1988; 3. "Is It Love" Released: 1988

Professional ratings
Review scores
Source	Rating
AllMusic	3.5/5 stars
The Encyclopedia of Popular Music	2/5 stars
The Rolling Stone Album Guide	3/5 stars

Supersonic is the debut full-length studio album by American hip-hop group J. J. Fad. It was released on June 15, 1988, via Ruthless Records with executive production by Eazy-E. The album was certified gold by the Recording Industry Association of America on September 30, 1988.

== Background ==
Audio production was handled by N.W.A members Dr. Dre and DJ Yella, alongside Arabian Prince, who served as co-producer. In addition to the title track, the singles were "Way Out" and "Is It Love". The album was distributed by Atco Records, a division of Atlantic Records. The title track was written by group members Dania Maria Birks and Juanita Michelle Burns-Sperling, former members Juanita A. Lee and Fatima Shasheed, and Kim Nazel.

== Track listing ==
No.	Title	Writer(s)	Length
1.	"Supersonic"	D. Birks; F. Shaweed; J. Lee; J. Burns; K Nazel	3:53
2.	"Way Out"	J. Burns	2:49
3.	"Blame It on the Muzick"	A. Young	3:47
4.	"In the Mix"	M. Franklin; J. Burns	3:32
5.	"Eenie Meenie Beats"	D. Birks; J. Burns	2:55
6.	"My Dope Intro"	L. Patterson	3:38
7.	"Let's Get Hyped"	A. Young	3:41
8.	"Now Really"	A. Young	3:20
9.	"Time tah Get Stupid"	A. Young	1:55
10.	"Is It Love"	M. Franklin; J. Burns	3:04
Total length:			32:34

== Personnel ==
- Chris Bellman – mastering
- Dania Maria Birks – lead vocals, backing vocals
- Juana Michelle Burns – lead vocals, backing vocals
- Antoine Carraby – producer, mixing, backing vocals
- Bob Defrin – art direction
- Michelle Franklin – lead vocals, backing vocals
- Jerry Heller – management
- Stanley A. Jones – guitar, backing vocals
- Clarence Lars – scratches
- Kim Renard Nazel – co–producer, mixing, backing vocals
- Lorenzo Patterson – backing vocals
- Aaron Rapoport – photography
- Donovan Smith – mixing
- Eric Wright – executive producer, backing vocals
- Andre Young – producer, mixing, backing vocals

== Charts ==
=== Weekly charts ===
Chart (1988)	Peak position
US Billboard 200	49
US Top R&B/Hip-Hop Albums (Billboard)	20

=== Year-end charts ===
Chart (1988)	Position
US Top R&B/Hip-Hop Albums (Billboard)	81

== Certifications ==
Region	Certification	Certified units/sales
United States (RIAA)	Gold	500,000^{^}
^{^} Shipments figures based on certification alone.
