= Blood of Abraham =

American hip hop duo

- Also known as: BOA
- Origin: Los Angeles, California; Santa Monica, California
- Genres: Alternative hip hop, Jewish hip hop, West Coast hip hop
- Years active: 1993-2000
- Labels: Ruthless/Relativity, Atomic Pop
- Members: MC Mazik; MC Benyad

Blood of Abraham was an American hip-hop duo composed of Benyad (Benjamin Mor) and Mazik (David Saevitz). They debuted in 1993 with the release of the LP Future Profits on Ruthless Records.

A key characteristic of the group was their unapologetic Jewish identity. Their best-known track is "Niggaz and Jewz (Some Say Kikes)", a call for black–Jewish unity in the face of shared struggle against bigotry. Made at the height of the strain on Black-Jewish relations in the United States, its opening sample was an actual recording of a Ku Klux Klansman. It featured a verse from Eazy-E as well as the first recorded appearance by will.i.am of the Black Eyed Peas known then as Will 1X (the group was then known as "Atban Klann".) Other tracks dealing with Jewish themes were "Father of Many Nations" (a song in praise of the patriarch Abraham) and "Stick To Your Own Kind".

A video was shot for the track "Stabbed by the Steeple," and print ads were centered on large text proclaiming "Jesus was a Black Jew," but the album did not receive much publicity beyond that. Blood of Abraham fell into anonymity; their status worsened in 1995 with the death of Eazy-E and the folding of the Ruthless and Relativity Records labels.

Mazik and Benyad then went on hiatus until 2000, which saw the unofficial release of the LP Eyedollartree on Mastergrip Records, which folded shortly thereafter. Eyedollartree featured guest appearances from rappers Kool Keith and Divine Styler, as well as production from will.i.am., Cyrus Melchor and Motiv8. Basement Records oversaw the official release of Eyedollartree (with bonus DVD) in late 2005.

As of late, former Blood of Abraham member Benjamin Mor has become an in-demand music video director. He has directed clips for Nas, Katy Perry and a few music videos for the Black Eyed Peas.

== Discography ==
=== Albums ===
- Future Profits, 16 November 1993
  - Singles: "Stabbed By The Steeple" "Life"
- Eyedollartree, 2 May 2000
  - Singles: "99¢ Lighter" "Velvet Glove, Iron Fist"
