= Uncle Sam's Curse =

Studio album by Above the Law
- Released: July 12, 1994
- Recorded: 1993–1994
- Studio: The Edge Recording (California)
- Genre: West Coast hip-hop; gangsta rap; G-funk
- Length: 59:57
- Label: Ruthless; Relativity
- Producer: Cold 187um; DJ K-oss (co.); KM.G (co.)

Above the Law chronology
Black Mafia Life (1993)	Uncle Sam's Curse (1994)	Time Will Reveal (1996)

Singles from Uncle Sam's Curse
- 1. "Black Superman" Released: June 28, 1994; 2. "Kalifornia" Released: July 12, 1994

Uncle Sam's Curse is the third studio album by the American hip hop group Above the Law. It was released in 1994, the group's final record on Ruthless Records. The album peaked at number 15 on the Top R&B/Hip-Hop Albums and 113 on the Billboard 200. Uncle Sam's Curse sold over 250,000 copies.

Audio production was handled by A.T.L.'s Cold 187um with co-producers KM.G and K-oss. The tracks "Return of the Real Shit" and "Black Superman" contain samples from the 1994 film Against the Wall.

== Critical reception ==
Professional ratings
Review scores
Source	Rating
AllMusic	3.5/5 stars

Trouser Press wrote that "Cold 187um kicks more good grooves as producer, but he can't smooth over the lyrical nonsense."

In 2016, LA Weekly called the album "an hourlong, funk-driven study in urban injustice and middle-American anxiety released halfway through the summer of the Brentwood murders, Newt Gingrich's Contract With America and the Major League Baseball strike."

== Track listing ==
No.	Title	Length
1.	"Return of the Real Shit"	5:42
2.	"Set Free"	4:49
3.	"Kalifornia" (featuring Kokane)	4:35
4.	"Concreat Jungle"	4:25
5.	"Rain Be for Rain Bo"	4:34
6.	"Everything Will Be Alright" (featuring Kokane)	4:54
7.	"Black Superman"	4:27
8.	"The 'G' in Me"	4:52
9.	"Uncle Sam's Curse"	4:47
10.	"One Time Two Many"	4:49
11.	"Who Ryde" (featuring Tone Lōc & Kokane)	5:30
12.	"Gangsta Madness"	6:46
Total length:		1:00:10

== Personnel ==
- Gregory Fernan Hutchinson — main artist, producer, keyboards, mixing
- Kevin Michael Gulley — main artist, co-producer
- Anthony Stewart — main artist, co-producer
- Jerry Long, Jr. — featured artist (tracks 3, 6, 11)
- Anthony Terrell Smith — featured artist (track 11)
- Mike Smooth — bass, guitar, keyboards
- Jimmy Russell — bass
- Brian Gardner — mastering
- Mark Paladino — mixing
- Michael Miller — photography
- David Bett — art direction
- Allan Wai — design
- Kurt Nagahori — illustration (cover)
- Joanna — backing vocals
- Nicki — backing vocals

== Charts ==
=== Weekly charts ===
Chart (1994)	Peak position
US Billboard 200	113
US Top R&B/Hip-Hop Albums (Billboard)	15

=== Year-end charts ===
Chart (1994)	Position
US Top R&B/Hip-Hop Albums (Billboard)	86
