= Sex, Money & Music =

Studio album by Above the Law
- Released: February 27, 2009
- Recorded: 2001–2002
- Genre: West Coast hip hop; gangsta rap
- Length: 1:00:01
- Label: Beatology

Above the Law chronology
Forever: Rich Thugs, Book One (1999)	Sex, Money & Music (2009)

Singles from Sex, Money & Music
- 1. "Sex, Money & Music/Ghetto Platinum" Released: 2002

Sex, Money & Music is the seventh studio album by American hip hop group Above the Law. It was released on February 27, 2009 as a digital download, on the Beatology label. The record featured guest appearances from Kokane, Heather Hunter, Mannish Flats, Hazmad and Alan McNeil.

Its lead single, "Sex, Money & Music", was released in 2002 on their own West World Records and peaked at number 58 on the Hot R&B/Hip-Hop Songs. That same year, the complete album entitled Diary Of A Drug Dealer was recorded and supposed to be released through Death Row Records. However, it was reported that a deal could not be worked out between the group and the label, therefore the project was shelved indefinitely, until 2009.

== Track listing ==
No.	Title	Length
1.	"Intro"	1:42
2.	"West to the World"	3:15
3.	"Strippers"	3:49
4.	"Playas, Gangstas and Ballers" (featuring Heather Hunter & Alan McNeil)	3:36
5.	"Still Smoking"	3:35
6.	"Extasy"	3:29
7.	"Ghetto Platinum" (featuring Hazmad)	3:55
8.	"Life" (featuring Kokane)	5:03
9.	"Ball and Never Fall"	4:32
10.	"Push"	4:41
11.	"Sex, Money and Music"	4:12
12.	"Kaos Radio"	1:08
13.	"Precious" (featuring Mannish Flats)	4:47
14.	"Gutta" (featuring Kokane)	4:14
15.	"Flippin' Birds"	2:27
16.	"Cold Piece of Work"	1:30
17.	"Freak in Me" (featuring Heather Hunter & Alan McNeil)	4:06
Total length:		1:00:01

== Chart positions ==
Billboard charts singles

- "Sex, Money & Music" Hot R&B/Hip-Hop Songs (#58)
