= Not Just a Fad =

Studio album by J.J. Fad
- Released: November 13, 1990
- Recorded: 1989–1990
- Studio: Audio Achievements (Torrance, CA)
- Genres: Hip hop; electro
- Length: 40:08
- Label: Ruthless
- Producers: Arabian Prince; DJ Yella

J.J. Fad chronology
Supersonic (1988)	Not Just a Fad (1990)

Singles from Not Just a Fad
- 1. "We in the House" Released: 1990; 2. "Gold" Released: 1990; 3. "Be Good Ta Me" Released: 1990

Not Just a Fad is the second studio album by the American female rap group J.J. Fad. It was released in 1990 via Ruthless Records. The album spawned three singles: "We in the House", "Gold", and "Be Good ta Me". Neither the album nor the singles registered on any major music chart. Although the group never officially broke up, they have not released an album since Not Just a Fad.

== Production ==
The album was primarily produced by DJ Yella. Dr. Dre was originally going to produce the album, but he wanted to push back the sessions; J.J. Fad decided not to wait on him.

== Critical reception ==
Professional ratings
Review scores
Source	Rating
AllMusic	2.5/5 stars
Chicago Tribune	3.5/4 stars
The Encyclopedia of Popular Music	2/5 stars
Entertainment Weekly	B
Los Angeles Times	2/4 stars
RapReviews	5/10
The Rolling Stone Album Guide	1.5/5 stars

The Los Angeles Times wrote: "This heretofore lightweight West Coast trio has always been pitted against Salt-N-Pepa, the New York-based rap unit whose style is far tougher and grittier. This time around, J.J. Fad's idea of fighting fire with fire is to come on like Luke Campbell's dream dates—though they do close the album by chastely thanking 'the man up above.'"

== Track listing ==
No.	Title	Length
1.	"Intro"	0:23
2.	"We in the House"	4:12
3.	"Gold"	3:28
4.	"Be Good ta Me"	4:26
5.	"Intro"	0:16
6.	"Work It"	4:07
7.	"Intro"	0:08
8.	"It's da Fad"	4:05
9.	"Intro"	0:14
10.	"Not Just a Fad"	3:33
11.	"We Want It All"	3:56
12.	"Step"	2:57
13.	"Intro"	0:17
14.	"Ain't Nothin' Comin'"	5:23
15.	"We'd Like to Thank"	2:43
Total length:		40:08

Sample credits

- Track 2 contains elements from "Pump That Bass" by Original Concept (1986), "Dance to the Drummer's Beat" by Herman Kelly & Life (1978), "Looking for the Perfect Beat" by Afrika Bambaataa & Soulsonic Force (1983)
- Track 3 contains elements from "Get Me Back on Time, Engine #9" by Wilson Pickett (1970)
- Track 4 contains elements from "Hot Pants (Bonus Beats)" by Bobby Byrd (1987), "Funky Drummer" by James Brown (1970), "I Wouldn't Change a Thing" by Coke Escovedo (1976), "I Know You Got Soul" by Bobby Byrd (1971), "Funky President (People It's Bad)" by James Brown (1974)
- Track 8 contains elements from "Think (About It)" by Lyn Collins (1972)
- Track 10 contains elements from "Get Up Offa That Thing" by James Brown (1976), "Troglodyte (Cave Man)" by the Jimmy Castor Bunch (1972), "Christmas Rappin'" by Kurtis Blow (1979), "Funky Drummer" by James Brown (1970), "Ashley's Roachclip" by the Soul Searchers (1974), "Kool Is Back" by Funk, Inc. (1971), "N.T." by Kool & the Gang (1971), "Terminator X Speaks with His Hands" by Public Enemy (1987)
- Track 11 contains elements from "Ashley's Roachclip" by the Soul Searchers (1974), "Troglodyte (Cave Man)" by the Jimmy Castor Bunch (1972), "Funky Drummer" by James Brown (1970), "Christmas Rappin'" by Kurtis Blow (1979), "N.T." by Kool & the Gang (1971), "Terminator X Speaks with His Hands" by Public Enemy (1987)
- Track 15 contains elements from "The Champ" by the Mohawks (1968), "Funky Drummer" by James Brown (1970)

== Personnel ==
- Dania Maria Birks – lead vocals, backing vocals
- Juana Michelle Burns – lead vocals, backing vocals
- Antoine Carraby – producer
- Peter Dokus – photography
- Michelle Franklin – lead vocals, backing vocals
- Brian Knapp Gardner – mastering
- Stan Kocontes – backing vocals (track 14)
- Clarence Lars – scratches
- Kim Renard Nazel – producer (tracks: 1, 2, 4–9, 11–14)
- Michael Sims – guitar, bass guitar
- Donovan Smith – engineer
- Eric Wright – executive producer
