= HWA (group) =

American hip hop group

H.W.A.
- From left to right: Jazz, Baby Girl and Go-Di

Background information
- Also known as: Hoez With Attitude
- Origin: Compton, California, U.S.
- Genres: Hip hop
- Years active: 1989–1994, 2012–present
- Labels: Ruthless; Relativity; Drive-By
- Members: Jazz; Diva; Baby Girl; Go-Di

H.W.A. (an initialism of Hoez With Attitude) is an American all-female hip hop trio composed of Jazz, Diva and Baby Girl; Diva was later on replaced by Go-Di. They were active between 1989 and 1994, and reformed in April 2012. Their name is a reference to another hip hop / gangsta rap group, N.W.A.

== History ==
The three members came together in 1989, founded and funded by Chicago's Keith "KP" Presley, and soon secured an independent label, Drive-By Records, to record their first album Livin' in a Hoe House. The album was not a huge success, although it did sell almost 400,000 copies, reaching No. 38 on the Top R&B/Hip-Hop Albums chart, but the group became known for its sexually explicit lyrics and they were soon signed to Eazy-E's Ruthless Records. Their second album, Az Much Ass Azz U Want, was even less of a success, reaching No. 71 on the Top R&B/Hip-Hop Albums chart. They also made a cameo appearance in Eazy-E's "diss" song to Dr. Dre and Snoop Dogg, "Real Muthaphuckkin G's".

In 1993, H.W.A. released a single called "All That (Juzt a Little Action", which received a generous amount of airtime due to the involvement of Eazy-E.

In 1994, H.W.A. released a remix album called I Ain't No Lady. Afterwards, H.W.A disbanded.

In April 2012, according to Jazz, H.W.A. reformed.

== Discography ==
Release Information
Livin' in a Hoe House
- Released: 1990
- Chart positions: No. 38 Top R&B/Hip-Hop
- Singles: "Eat This", "Little Dick"
Az Much Ass Azz U Want
- Released: February 22, 1994
- Chart positions: No. 71 Top R&B/Hip-Hop, No. 33 Top Heatseakers
- Singles: "All That (Juzt A Little Action)"
