= Livin' Like Hustlers =

Studio album by Above the Law
- Released: February 20, 1990
- Recorded: 1989
- Genres: West Coast hip hop; gangsta rap
- Length: 45:52
- Labels: Ruthless; Epic
- Producers: Above the Law; Dr. Dre; Laylaw

Above the Law chronology
Livin' Like Hustlers (1990)	Vocally Pimpin' (1991)

Singles from Livin' Like Hustlers
- 1. "Murder Rap" Released: February 8, 1990; 2. "Untouchable" Released: 1990

Livin' Like Hustlers is the debut album by American hip hop group Above the Law. It was released on February 20, 1990, via Ruthless Records; an advanced promo cassette version was released two months earlier. The album was produced by Dr. Dre and Above the Law and featured a guest performance from N.W.A on "The Last Song". Eazy-E served as executive producer. It peaked at number 14 on the Top R&B/Hip-Hop Albums and number 75 on the U.S. Billboard 200.

The album included two hit singles "Murder Rap" and "Untouchable", which both charted at number one on the Hot Rap Songs. The album's lead single, "Murder Rap", also peaked at number 41 on the Hot Dance Music/Maxi-Singles Sales. In 1998, the album was selected as one of The Source's 100 Best Rap Albums Ever.

== Critical reception ==
The Los Angeles Times opined that "Cold 187um and KMG are defeated by their unimaginative writing and sloppy rapping."

== In popular culture ==
- "Murder Rap" was featured in the 2009 film Pineapple Express, the 2004 video game Grand Theft Auto San Andreas, and the 2018 film City of Lies.
- "Freedom of Speech" appeared on the soundtrack to the 1990 film Pump Up the Volume.

== Track listing ==
All songs produced by Dr. Dre and Above the Law.

No.	Title	Writer(s)	Length
1.	"Murder Rap"	G. Hutchinson; A. Stewart; A. Young; A. Goodman; K. Gulley; L. Goodman	4:14
2.	"Untouchable"	G. Hutchinson; K. Gulley; J. Morrison; J. Densmore; Q. Jones; R. Manzarek; R. Krieger	3:45
3.	"Livin' Like Hustlers"	G. Hutchinson; K. Gulley; B. Cosby; Q. Jones	5:45
4.	"Another Execution"	G. Hutchinson; I. Hayes	4:21
5.	"Menace to Society"	G. Hutchinson; A. Stewart; A. Goodman; K. Gulley; G. Burton; J. Constantino; T. Martin	4:33
6.	"Just Kickin' Lyrics"	G. Hutchinson; A. Isbell; I. Hayes	4:22
7.	"Ballin'"	A. Goodman; L. Blackmon	4:19
8.	"Freedom of Speech"	G. Hutchinson; L. Goodman; J. Brown	4:20
9.	"Flow On (Move Me No Mountain)"	A. Schroeder; J. Ragovoy; G. Hutchinson; K. Gulley	3:57
10.	"The Last Song" (featuring N.W.A.)	G. Hutchinson; A. Goodman; K. Gulley; L. Goodman; A. Young; E. Wright; L. Patterson	6:21
Total length:			45:52

Sample credits

- "Murder Rap" contains elements from "Ironside" by Quincy Jones (1971), "Hook and Sling - Part I" by Eddie Bo (1969), "Keep Your Distance" by Babe Ruth (1976), "Funky Drummer" by James Brown (1970) and "Sister Sanctified" by Stanley Turrentine & Milt Jackson (1972)
- "Untouchable" contains elements from "Light My Fire" by Young-Holt Unlimited (1969), "Ironside" by Quincy Jones (1971), "Funky Drummer" by James Brown (1970), "Fuck tha Police" by N.W.A (1988)
- "Livin' Like Hustlers" contains elements from "Hikky Burr" by Quincy Jones & Bill Cosby (1971), "The Champ" by The Mohawks (1968), "Hot (I Need to Be Loved, Loved, Loved, Loved)" by James Brown (1975), "Comm. 2" by The D.O.C. (1989) and "The Big Beat" by Billy Squier (1980)
- "Another Execution" contains elements from "Do Your Thing" by Lyn Collins (1972), "Good Old Music" by Funkadelic (1970) and "Afro-Strut" by the Nite-Liters (1972)
- "Menace to Society" contains elements from "Let a Woman Be a Woman, Let a Man Be a Man" by Dyke and the Blazers (1969), "I Got You (I Feel Good)" by James Brown (1965) and "Once You Get It", "This House Is Smokin'", "Do You Like It" by B.T. Express (1974)
- "Just Kickin' Lyrics" contains elements from "Hyperbolicsyllabicsesquedalymistic" by Isaac Hayes (1969), "More Peas" by Fred Wesley & the J.B.'s (1973), "Papa Was Too" by Joe Tex (1966)
- "Ballin'" contains elements from "Why Have I Lost You" by Cameo (1977)
- "Freedom of Speech" contains elements from "The Message from the Soul Sisters" by Myra Barnes (1970) and "Funky Drummer" by James Brown (1970)
- "Flow On" contains elements from "Move Me No Mountain" by Love Unlimited (1974) and "Paid in Full" by Eric B. & Rakim (1987)
- "The Last Song" contains elements from "Baby Let Me Take You (In My Arms)" by the Detroit Emeralds (1972) and "Gangsta Gangsta" by N.W.A (1988)

== Personnel ==
- Gregory Fernan Hutchinson - lead vocals, additional vocals, producer
- Kevin Michael Gulley - lead vocals, additional vocals, producer
- Arthur Lee Goodman III - additional vocals, producer
- Larry Goodman - additional vocals, producer, management
- Anthony Stewart - additional vocals, producer
- Eric Wright - guest vocals, executive producer
- Andre Young - guest vocals, producer
- Lorenzo Patterson - guest vocals
- Michael Sims - additional vocals, guitar, bass
- Andre "L.A. Dre" Bolton - keyboards
- Brian Gardner - mastering
- Donovan Smith - engineering
- Helane Freeman - art direction
- Peter Dokus - photography

== Charts ==
=== Weekly charts ===
Chart (1990)	Peak position
US Billboard 200	75
US Top R&B/Hip-Hop Albums (Billboard)	14

=== Year-end charts ===
Chart (1990)	Position
US Top R&B/Hip-Hop Albums (Billboard)	50

== Singles ==
Year	Single	Chart	Position
1990	"Murder Rap"	Hot Dance Music/Maxi-Singles Sales	41
1990	"Murder Rap"	Hot Rap Singles	1
1990	"Untouchable"	Hot Rap Singles	1
