= J. J. Fad =

American hip hop group

J.J. Fad
- Also known as: Original J.J. Fad
- Origin: Rialto, California, U.S.
- Genre: Hip hop
- Years active: 1985–1992; 2021–present
- Label: Dream Team Records Ruthless
- Members: Juana Burns "MC J.B."; Dania Birks "Baby D"; Michelle Franklin "Sassy C"
- Past members: Anna Cash "Lady Anna"; Juanita Lee "Crazy J."; Fatima Shaheed "O.G. Rocker"; DJ Train
- Website: jjfad.com

J.J. Fad is an American female rap group from Rialto, California. The name was an acronym of the original group members' given names (Juana, Juanita, Fatima, Anna, and Dania), but when the line-up changed the tradition developed that it stood for Just Jammin', Fresh And Def. The group was backed by DJ Train (Clarence Lars).

== History ==
=== Beginnings ===
J.J. Fad began in 1985 as a quintet comprising Juana Burns (MC J.B.), Dania Birks (Baby-D), Anna Cash (Lady Anna), Fatima Shaheed (O.G. Rocker) and Juanita Lee (Crazy J.). It was one of the original acts signed to Ruthless Records by Eazy-E. In 1987, before officially joining Ruthless, this line-up released its only recording, the single "Anotha Ho" backed with "Supersonic" ("Anotha Ho" was the A-side), produced by Arabian Prince and released by Dream Team Records.

=== Supersonic ===
Due to management and financial disagreements, Cash, Shaheed and Lee quit the group, leaving J.J. Fad as a duo. The remaining original members (Burns and Birks) were joined by Michelle Franklin (Sassy C.) and DJ Train, and together they re-recorded and re-released "Supersonic" in 1988, also produced by Arabian Prince and joined by Dr Dre and DJ Yella, this time as the A-side. It sold 400,000 copies independently before Eazy-E and Jerry Heller secured the group a major-label recording contract with Atco Records.

The single was followed by the album Supersonic, produced by Dr. Dre, DJ Yella, and co-produced by Arabian Prince, who made J.J. Fad accessible to pop audiences—unlike many West Coast rappers of the day—by including electro elements in their music.

Both the single "Supersonic" and the album Supersonic were certified gold in 1988. By mid 1992 the album itself was certified double platinum in the United States. (The group believes the single sold 1 million copies in the U.S.—equivalent to platinum status—but this has not been certified.)

=== Not Just a Fad ===
With Eazy and Heller enjoying success with N.W.A, it was three years before J.J. Fad returned with a follow-up album. Not Just a Fad was released in 1991, produced by Arabian Prince (who already left Ruthless in early 1989) and Yella and executively produced by Eazy, but failed to make an impact. The group disbanded shortly afterward. DJ Train died in 1994 of smoke inhalation.

=== Later years ===
After almost two decades out of the music industry raising families, the classic trio of J.J. Fad reunited. The group performs at old-school and freestyle concerts.

In 2004, MF Doom sampled the beatboxing intro from the 1988 video for "Supersonic" in his song "Jasmine Blossoms", which would be sampled by himself for "Hoe Cakes" from his album Mm..Food.

In 2006, Fergie used an interpolation of "Supersonic" in her song "Fergalicious".

"Supersonic" appeared in the music video game Dance Central 3 (2012), which J. J. Fad promoted on its Facebook page.

The 2015 biopic film Straight Outta Compton left out the story of J. J. Fad and how some in the media felt the group was responsible for "forging a path for the breakout success of N.W.A".

The second trailer for the 2020 movie Sonic the Hedgehog features the song "Supersonic".

== Discography ==
=== Studio albums ===
List of studio albums, with selected chart positions and certifications
Title	Album details	Peak chart positions		Certifications
Title	Album details	US	US R&B /HH	Certifications
Supersonic	Released: July 5, 1988; Label: Ruthless/Atco; Formats: CD, LP, cassette, digital download, streaming	49	20	RIAA: Gold
Not Just a Fad	Released: December 7, 1990; Label: Ruthless; Formats: CD, LP, cassette, digital download, streaming	—	—	
"—" denotes a recording that did not chart or was not released in that territory.

=== Singles ===
==== As lead artist ====
List of singles, with selected chart positions and certifications, showing year released and album name
Title	Year	Peak chart positions				Certifications	Album
Title	Year	US	US Dance	US R&B	CAN Dance	Certifications	Album
"Anotha Ho"	1987	—	—	—	—		Non-album single
"Supersonic"	1988	30	10	22	1	RIAA: Gold	Supersonic
"Way Out"	1988	61	—	51	—		Supersonic
"Is It Love"	1988	92	—	—	—		Supersonic
"We in the House"	1990	—	—	—	—		Not Just a Fad
"Be Good Ta Me"	1991	—	—	—	—		Not Just a Fad
"—" denotes a recording that did not chart or was not released in that territory.

=== Featured singles ===
List of featured singles, with selected chart positions
Title	Year	Peak chart positions					Certifications	Album
Title	Year	US	US R&B	US Rap	AUS	NZ	Certifications	Album
"We're All in the Same Gang" (as part of The West Coast Rap All-Stars)	1990	35	10	1	106	11	RIAA: Gold	We're All in the Same Gang
"Fellas" (Ozomatli featuring J. J. Fad and Lisa Lisa)	2021	—	—	—	—	—		Marching On
"—" denotes a recording that did not chart or was not released in that territory.

=== Guest appearances ===
List of non-single guest appearances, with other performing artists, showing year released and album name
Title	Year	Other performer(s)	Album
"Comin' Correct"	1989	—N/a	Coming to America Soundtrack
