= The Lawhouse Experience, Volume One =

Compilation album by various artists
- Released: August 29, 1997
- Studio: Da Lawhouse Recording Studio Complex (Los Angeles, CA)
- Genre: West Coast hip hop; gangsta rap
- Length: 55:54
- Label: Zomba
- Producer: André "Cool Dré" McJimson (exec.); Laylaw (also exec.); D'Maq

The Lawhouse Experience, Volume One is a hip hop compilation album presented by American producer Larry "Laylaw" Goodman. The eighteen-track album features guest appearances from several notable West Coast hip hop recording artists, such as Above The Law, Coolio, Dru Down, Ice Cube, Ice-T, Kausion, K-Dee, Kokane, Luniz, L.V., Ras Kass, The Pharcyde, WC and Xzibit. Recording sessions for the album took place at Da Lawhouse Recording Studio Complex in Los Angeles, California. It was released on August 29, 1997, via Zomba Records. Audio production of the album was handled primarily by Laylaw and Derrick "D'Maq" McDowell. It peaked at number 169 on the US Billboard 200 and at number 43 on the US Billboard Top R&B/Hip-Hop Albums.

== Critical reception ==
Professional ratings
Review scores
Source	Rating
AllMusic	3/5 stars
Rap Pages	(positive)
The Source	2.5/5 stars
XXL	1/5 stars

Rap Pages "...The Lawhouse Experience, Volume One showcases different styles of hip hop that are currently being perfected in the L.A. metro area, as well as adding a little Bay area flavor from the Luniz and Dru Down...."

The Source "...As with most compilations of this sort, it's not surprising that this album is laced with hit-and-miss material..."

== Track listing ==
No.	Title	Producer(s)	Length
1.	"Entrance" (featuring Coolio & Kokane)	Laylaw	1:47
2.	"Arch Angles" (featuring Ras Kass & Xzibit)	Laylaw; D'Maq	3:57
3.	"Give It Up" (featuring WC)	Laylaw; D'Maq	4:02
4.	"Legal Paper" (featuring Ice Cube)	Laylaw	4:16
5.	"Spank That Ass" (featuring Phat Freddie)	Laylaw	1:17
6.	"Your Hustle Ain't On" (featuring Ice-T)	Laylaw; D'Maq	3:56
7.	"One Way In" (featuring Go Mack)	Laylaw; D'Maq	3:54
8.	"Lil' Sumpin'" (featuring Kausion)	Laylaw; D'Maq	4:11
9.	"Drank Break" (featuring Barney Rubble)	Laylaw	0:48
10.	"Live Yo Life" (featuring Luniz & Dru Down)	Laylaw; D'Maq	4:22
11.	"You Might Get Stuck" (featuring Above The Law)	Laylaw; D'Maq	4:34
12.	"Phalosmode" (featuring Phalos)	Laylaw; D'Maq	4:18
13.	"Housin'" (featuring Eightball)	Laylaw	0:27
14.	"World Wide" (featuring K-Dee)	Laylaw	3:57
15.	"Westcyde 242" (featuring The Pharcyde)	Laylaw; D'Maq	4:20
16.	"I Just Wanna Play" (featuring L.V.)	Laylaw; D'Maq	3:14
17.	"Phat Chance" (featuring Phat Freddie)	Laylaw	0:33
18.	"Exit" (featuring Kokane)	Laylaw	2:01
Total length:			55:54

Sample credits

- Track 8 contains elements from "Chameleon" by Herbie Hancock, and "Flash Light" by Parliament
- Track 15 contains elements from "Gin and Juice" by Snoop Doggy Dogg

== Personnel ==
- Alvin Nathaniel Joiner – performer (track 2)
- Amp Blaq – producer, executive producer
- Andre James McJimson – executive producer
- Arthur Lee Goodman III – performer (track 7)
- Artis Leon Ivey Jr. – performer (track 1)
- Bob Morse – engineering
- Carl Kenneth Small – percussion
- Command A Studios, Inc. – design
- Danyel Robinson – performer (track 10)
- Darrell L. Johnson – performer (track 14)
- Derrick K. McDowell – producer (tracks: 2–3, 6–8, 10–12, 15–16), mixing
- Derrick Stewart – performer (track 15)
- Doug Haverty – art direction
- Gregory Fernan Hutchison – performer (track 11)
- Jerry B. Long Jr. – performer (tracks: 1, 18)
- John Austin IV – performer (track 2)
- Johnny Buzzerio – photography
- Kausion – performers (track 8)
- Kevin Michael Gulley – performer (track 11)
- Kohl Blaq – producer, executive producer
- Lawrence Goodman – producer, mixing
- Luniz – performers (track 10)
- Mark Chalecki – mastering
- O'Shea Jackson Sr. – performer (track 4)
- Phalos Mode – performer (track 12)
- Phat Freddie – performer (tracks: 5, 17)
- Premro Smith – performer (track 13)
- Romye Robinson – performer (track 15)
- Sean "Barney Rubble" Thomas – keyboards
- Stealth – producer
- Tracy Lauren Marrow – performer (track 6)
- Tristan G. Jones – mixing
- William Loshawn Calhoun Jr. – performer (track 3)

== Chart history ==
Chart (1997)	Peak position
US Billboard 200	169
US Top R&B/Hip-Hop Albums (Billboard)	43
