= Above the Law (group) =

American hip hop group

- Also known as: A.T.L.
- Origin: Pomona, California, U.S.
- Genres: West Coast hip-hop; gangsta rap; G-funk
- Works: Discography
- Years active: 1989–2012
- Labels: Ruthless; Death Row; Tommy Boy
- Past members: Cold 187um; KMG the Illustrator; Go Mack; DJ Total K-Oss

Above the Law was an American hip-hop group from Pomona, California, founded in 1989 by Cold 187um, KMG the Illustrator, Go Mack, and DJ Total K-Oss.

== Biography ==
In 1989, the group signed with Eazy-E's Ruthless Records. While there, the group became an additional influence in pioneering with N.W.A. Their first album on Ruthless, 1990's Livin' Like Hustlers, featured a guest appearance from N.W.A and production from Dr. Dre. Above the Law member Cold 187um worked closely with Dre on production, and the two influenced each other. The songs "Murder Rap" and "Untouchable" became minor hits from the album. "Murder Rap" later appeared in the 2008 film Pineapple Express, and the song "Freedom of Speech" was also featured in the 1990 movie Pump Up the Volume and its soundtrack album. In September 1990, members of Above the Law clashed with Ice Cube and his posse, Da Lench Mob, during the annual New Music Seminar conference.

The group's first album, Livin' Like Hustlers, was released in 1990. This album, which came out before Dr. Dre's The Chronic, featured a similar G-Funk sound. Cold 187um has claimed that he was the first to pioneer the G-Funk style and that Dr. Dre's new sound was largely inspired by his work on that album. In 1994, the group released Uncle Sam's Curse, their last album on Ruthless Records. It included the minor hit "Black Superman".

Above the Law would have been N.W.A. if N.W.A. never existed.

— Jerry Heller on Above the Law

Shortly after Eazy-E's death, the group signed with Tommy Boy Records in 1996. There, they released Time Will Reveal in 1996 and Legends in 1999. In the same year, the group signed with Suge Knight's Death Row Records, but they left the label in 2002. Above the Law was also part of the West Coast Rap All-Stars, contributing to "We're All in the Same Gang," a 1990 collaboration of West Coast hip-hop artists promoting an anti-violence message.

On the morning of July 7, 2012, multiple sources confirmed that emcee KMG the Illustrator had died. Longtime Above the Law affiliate Kokane announced the rapper's death on his Twitter account the same day. While the cause of death remains officially unknown, Cold 187um stated that he died of a heart attack while taking a shower. He was 43 years old.

Four of the group's most popular music videos, "Black Superman," "Call It What U Want" featuring 2Pac and Money-B, "V.S.O.P.," and the long-form music video "V.S.O.P. REMIX" were written and directed by Marty Thomas, Eazy-E's longtime Ruthless Records film director. Thomas also wrote and directed the controversial and ultimately banned Uncle Sam's Curse album television commercials. These commercials featured disturbing imagery, including the KKK chasing Above the Law past a church with burning torches and a white "Uncle Sam" pulling a newborn African-American baby from its mother's arms. The commercial won several prestigious international awards.

According to Kokane, a new Above the Law album was recorded before KMG's death. Cold 187um has stated that over 30 unreleased tracks were recorded while KMG was still alive, with the rumored title Victims of Global Politics. However, no release date has been announced.

Above the Law claims to have invented the "G-funk" sound, which was later popularized by Dr. Dre's The Chronic.

Go Mack died in May 2025.

== Discography ==
Studio albums

- Livin' Like Hustlers (1990)
- Black Mafia Life (1993)
- Uncle Sam's Curse (1994)
- Time Will Reveal (1996)
- Legends (1998)
- Forever: Rich Thugs, Book One (1999)
- Sex, Money & Music (2009)
- Pomona Love (2024)

Extended plays

- Vocally Pimpin' (1991)
