= Ruthless Records =

American hip hop record label

- Founded: March 3, 1987; 39 years ago
- Founder: Eric "Eazy-E" Wright; Jerry Heller
- Status: Defunct
- Distributors: Macola; Priority; Atlantic; Relativity; Epic
- Genre: Hip-hop; R&B
- Country of origin: United States
- Location: Suite 100, 21860 Burbank Boulevard, Woodland Hills, California, U.S.

Ruthless Records was an American record label founded by Eric "Eazy-E" Wright and Jerry Heller in Compton, California, on March 3, 1987. All of the Ruthless trademarks have been owned by Comptown Records, Inc. since 1987. Several artists and groups on the label such as N.W.A, Eazy-E, MC Ren, the D.O.C., Michel'le, Above the Law and Bone Thugs-n-Harmony have released RIAA certified albums.

== History ==
=== 1987—1991: JJ Fad, N.W.A and Priority deal ===
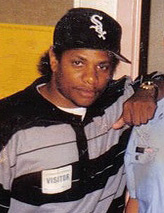
Eazy-E (founder) in 1993

In 1986, at age 22, Compton, California, resident Eric "Eazy-E" Wright had allegedly earned as much as US$250,000 from dealing drugs. However, after his cousin was shot and killed, he decided that he could make a better living in the Los Angeles hip hop scene, which was growing rapidly in popularity. He started recording songs during the mid-1980s in his parents' garage, thus starting Ruthless Records. The original idea for Ruthless Records came when Wright asked Heller to go into business with him. Wright suggested a half-ownership company, but it was later decided that Wright would get eighty percent of the company's income and Heller would only get twenty percent. According to Heller, he told Wright, "Every dollar comes into Ruthless, I take twenty cents. That's industry standard for a manager of my caliber. I take twenty, you take eighty percent. I am responsible for my expenses and you're responsible for yours. You own the company. I work for you." Along with Heller, Wright invested much of his money into Ruthless Records. Heller claims that he invested the first $250,000 and would eventually put up to $1,000,000 into the company. With help from Jerry Heller, Ruthless was launched on March 3, 1987, though Wright was the sole owner of the company.

One of the first albums for the label was Eazy's solo debut, Eazy-Duz-It, released in November 1988. It was followed two months later by N.W.A's Straight Outta Compton, which was eventually certified triple Platinum by the RIAA.

Ruthless closed out 1989 with the reissue of N.W.A.'s first compilation album, N.W.A. and the Posse, originally released in November 1987 through independent distributor Macola. The reissue was much more successful than the original release; despite not charting on the Billboard 200, it was ultimately certified gold by the RIAA for half a million copies sold. The album featured the Eazy-E solo hit, "The Boyz-n-the Hood".

As the N.W.A members went on tour in support of their projects, some began to voice their displeasure with the financial situation at Ruthless. According to group member MC Ren, it was a common opinion that N.W.A and Ruthless manager Jerry Heller was the one receiving their due:

We felt he didn't deserve what he was getting. We deserved that shit. We were the ones making the records, traveling in vans and driving all around the place. You do all those fucking shows trying to get known, and then you come home to a fucking apartment. Then you go to his house, and this motherfucker lives in a mansion. There's gold leaf trimmings all in the bathroom and all kinds of other shit. You're thinking, "Man, fuck that."

Heller, in his 2006 memoir Ruthless, disputes any allegations of financial misconduct.

In 1989, after coming off tour, group member Ice Cube voiced his opinions on the group's finances. Cube, who had been paid about $32,000 so far, asked Eazy-E for a meeting on money allocation. N.W.A's manager Jerry Heller, Eazy's business partner, led the meeting. At Cube's concerns, Heller offered N.W.A's five members—Eazy, Dr. Dre, Cube, DJ Yella, and MC Ren—a contract nearly unchanged, with a $75,000 signing bonus. Only Cube refused to sign it. Though Heller continually claimed that everything was in order, and even offered them to open the account books to prove his innocence, the ensuing confrontation ended in Ice Cube leaving N.W.A. in January 1990 without signing on as a solo artist to Ruthless, which the remaining members proceeded to do. Cube's departure caused the rest of the group to turn on him.

That August, through Ruthless, N.W.A. released their lone EP, 100 Miles and Runnin', with Dr. Dre and DJ Yella providing full production and Eazy-E providing executive production. In the EP's only single, 100 Miles and Runnin', alluding to Ice Cube, Dre raps, "It started with five, but yo, one couldn't take it / So now there's four, 'cause the fifth couldn't make it." And in "Real Niggaz", soon after Ren raps, "Only reason niggas pick up your record is 'cause they thought it was us", Dre calls Cube both "too much cargo" and the proverbial traitor Benedict Arnold. The EP was critically and commercially successful, going platinum in America.

The label also experienced outside pressure due to the group. The success of their song "Fuck tha Police" led to a threatening FBI letter to distributor Priority Records.

1988 also saw the release of J.J. Fad's gold-certified album Supersonic, produced by N.W.A members Dr. Dre and DJ Yella and co- produced by Arabian Prince and in 1989, singer Michel'le's first album Michel'le, and the D.O.C.'s critically acclaimed No One Can Do It Better (all released through Atlantic), the former produced by N.W.A beat-smiths Dr. Dre and DJ Yella with the latter produced solely by Dre; following these efforts, Dre and Yella returned to N.W.A, producing the 100 Miles and Runnin' E.P. and the group's sophomore effort, Niggaz4Life, which reached Platinum status. Above the Law's Livin' Like Hustlers was also released during this period (by way of Epic Records) and Kokane's Addictive Hip Hop Muzick.

In 1989, Eazy signed hip-hop's first white female rapper Tairrie B to Ruthless' new Comptown label subsidiary. She released her debut album The Power of a Woman in 1990 (through MCA Records) featuring the single and video for "Murder She Wrote" which Eazy and Philadelphia rapper Schoolly D appeared in. The album also featured guest vocals by Dr. Dre, D.O.C. and future House of Pain frontman Everlast, and production by QDIII

N.W.A. began to split in 1991. Dr. Dre recalls, "The split came when Jerry Heller got involved. He played the divide and conquer game. Instead of taking care of everybody, he picked one nigga to take care of and that was Eazy. And Eazy was like, 'I'm taken care of, so fuck it'." Dr. Dre was advised by The D.O.C. and the rapper's friend and bodyguard, Marion "Suge" Knight, that he should leave the label to avoid any possible financial meddling by Heller, offering to extricate Dre from his Ruthless contract. Dr. Dre and The D.O.C. sent Suge to look into Eazy-E's financial situation as they began to grow suspicious of Eazy-E and Jerry Heller. Dr. Dre and The D.O.C. asked Eazy-E to release them from Ruthless, but Eazy-E refused. The impasse led to what reportedly transpired between Suge Knight and Eazy at Audio Achievements. After he refused to release Dr. Dre and The D.O.C., Suge Knight told Eazy-E that he had kidnapped Jerry Heller and was holding him hostage in a van. This did not convince Eazy to release Dr. Dre and The D.O.C. from Ruthless. Knight succeeded in procuring Dre, D.O.C. and Michel'le's contracts—through reportedly illicit means—Suge Knight threatened Eazy-E's family: Suge Knight gave Eazy a piece of paper that contained Eazy's mother's address, telling him, "I know where your mama stays." Eazy-E finally signed Dr. Dre and The D.O.C.'s releases, officially ending N.W.A. Shortly thereafter, The D.O.C., Suge Knight and Dr. Dre founded Death Row Records.

=== N.W.A breakup and other Ruthless artists ===
Now short of Dr. Dre and The D.O.C., Eazy-E collaborated with several other artists, including rappers B.G. Knocc Out and Gangsta Dresta, as well as producers like Big Hutch and Rhythm D to fill their void. These collaborators played key roles in supporting Eazy during his rivalry with Death Row Records. Although closely affiliated with Ruthless Records, B.G. Knocc Out and Gangsta Dresta were never officially signed to the label. MC Ren and DJ Yella remained neutral in the feud. In August 1993, Relativity Entertainment Distribution announced that it would handle marketing and distribution services for Ruthless. The announcement came 2 months after Ruthless severed ties with Priority. In response to diss tracks such as Bitches Ain't Shit and the intro to Dr. Dre's 1992 debut, The Chronic, Eazy-E released It's On (Dr. Dre) 187um Killa through Epic Records and Ruthless. Released in October 1993, the majority of the EP as well as its title were directed towards Dr. Dre, Snoop Doggy Dogg and Death Row. It's On (Dr. Dre) 187um Killa remains to be Eazy-E's best selling project, debuting in the top five on the Billboard 200. With sales of over two million copies in America. The EP has been certified double platinum by the RIAA.

By 1994, MC Ren and Eazy-E had a falling out, with Ren calling Eazy "big headed" and even proposed a N.W.A. reunion without Eazy. Producer Big Hutch/Cold 187 um alleges that during this time period, even Wright began to feel as though Heller was dishonest with the label's finances:

When the money started rolling and a lot of cats couldn't come to the table and renegotiate...Ya know, it was fucked up! That's what was wrong. Like Eazy came to me one night and he said "Man, shit is fucked up, man." Because he was at a point where even he was getting played by Jerry Heller.

However he added, "I can't knock Jerry Heller... because Jerry Heller gave us all an opportunity. He took us to the people to get massive exposure. We couldn't have walked through the doors as brothers like that. We needed a guy like Jerry Heller to do that. You need that face, you need that voice, you need that guy with a connect like that. Without him there wouldn't have been none of that."

Eazy-E allegedly fired Heller shortly before his death in 1995.

=== Eazy-E's death and life after Eazy ===
On February 24, 1995, Wright was admitted to the Cedars-Sinai Medical Center in Los Angeles with a violent cough. He was diagnosed with HIV/AIDS. He announced his illness in a public statement on March 16. It is believed Wright contracted the infection from a sexual partner. During the week of March 20, having already made amends with Ice Cube, he drafted a final message to his fans. On March 26, Eazy-E died from HIV/AIDS, one month after his diagnosis. He was 30 years old (most reports at the time said he was 31 due to the falsification of his date of birth by one year). He was buried on April 7, at Rose Hills Memorial Park in Whittier, California. Over 3,000 people attended his funeral, including Jerry Heller and DJ Yella.

Before his death, he had just signed the Cleveland, Ohio-based group Bone Thugs-n-Harmony, whose 1994 extended play Creepin on ah Come Up was well received by critics and fans. The EP went 4× Platinum. Eazy-E executive produced Bone Thugs' second album, E 1999 Eternal, which was released shortly after his death. Their smash 1996 single "Tha Crossroads" was dedicated to Eazy-E and helped push the album to multi-platinum success.

In September 2003, Bone Thugs-N-Harmony announced that they had officially left Ruthless.

The label has had several distributors simultaneously. Early Ruthless releases were distributed by Macola. All of N.W.A's releases and Eazy-E's debut solo album on Ruthless Records were distributed by Priority, and the rights to these releases are now held by Priority's new owner, Capitol. Releases by the D.O.C, Michel'le, Yomo & Maulkie and JJ Fad were marketed through Atlantic or its subsidiary Atco. These master rights are still held by Atlantic's parent company, Warner, while Above The Law's releases were marketed through Epic and Giant. In 1994, Ruthless found exclusive distribution through Relativity, a former heavy metal label. Relativity was later folded into its parent company, Sony.

== Roster ==
=== Former artists ===
Act	Year signed	Releases under the label
Eazy-E	1987–1995	5
MC Ren	1987–1998	4
N.W.A	1987–1991	3
Ice Cube	1987–1990	—
J. J. Fad	1987–1991	2
Dr. Dre	1987–1991	—
The D.O.C.	1988–1991	1
Michel'le	1988–1991	1
Fila Fresh Crew (Note: Released a single under the Comptown imprint)	1988–1990	1
Yomo & Maulkie	1989–1992	1
Kokane	1989–1995	2
Tarrie B (Note: Released an album under the Comptown imprint)	1989–1994	1
Jimmy Z	1990–1991	1
Above the Law	1989–1996	4
Penthouse Players Clique	1991–1993	1
Atban Klann	1992–1995	—
H.W.A.	1992–1995	2
Menajahtwa	1992–1994	1
Blood of Abraham	1993–1994	1
Bone Thugs-n-Harmony	1993–2003	5
Sylk-E. Fyne	1994-1996	—
Brownside	1994–1995	—
Frost	1994–1997	2
King T	1997–2000	–
Spymob	2004-2005	2
Stevie Stone	2007–2009	1
Hopsin	2007–2009	1

=== Notable producers ===
Producer	Years on the label
Dr. Dre	1987–1991
Cold 187um	1989–1996
DJ U-Neek	1993–2003

== Discography ==
=== Studio albums ===
Artist	Album	Details
J. J. Fad	Supersonic	Released: June 15, 1988; Chart positions: No. 49 U.S.; RIAA certification: Gold
Eazy-E	Eazy-Duz-It	Released: November 22, 1988; Chart positions: No. 20 U.S.; RIAA certification: 2× Platinum
N.W.A	Straight Outta Compton	Released: January 25, 1989; Chart positions: No. 4 U.S.; RIAA certification: 3× Platinum
The D.O.C	No One Can Do It Better	Released: June 16, 1989; Chart positions: No. 20 U.S.; RIAA certification: Platinum
Michel'le	Michel'le	Released: October 23, 1989; Chart positions: No. 35 U.S.; RIAA certification: Gold
Above the Law	Livin' Like Hustlers	Released: February 20, 1990; Chart positions: No. 75 U.S.
N.W.A	100 Miles and Runnin'	Released: August 14, 1990; Chart positions: No. 27 U.S.; RIAA certification: Platinum
J. J. Fad	Not Just a Fad	Released: November 13, 1990
N.W.A	Niggaz4Life	Released: May 28, 1991; Chart positions: No. 1 U.S.; RIAA certification: Platinum
Above the Law	Vocally Pimpin'	Released: July 16, 1991; Chart positions: No. 120 U.S.
Yomo & Maulkie	Are U Xperienced?	Released: September 14, 1991
Jimmy Z	Muzical Madness	Released: October 1, 1991
Penthouse Players Clique	Paid the Cost	Released: April 21, 1992; Chart positions: No. 75 U.S.
MC Ren	Kizz My Black Azz	Released: June 30, 1992; Chart positions: No. 12 U.S.; RIAA certification: Platinum
Eazy-E	5150: Home 4 tha Sick	Released: December 15, 1992; Chart positions: No. 70 U.S.; RIAA certification: Gold
Above the Law	Black Mafia Life	Released: February 2, 1993; Chart positions: No. 37 U.S.
Eazy-E	It's On (Dr. Dre) 187um Killa	Released: October 19, 1993; Chart positions: No. 5 U.S.; RIAA certification: 2× Platinum
MC Ren	Shock of the Hour	Released: November 16, 1993; Chart positions: No. 22 U.S.
H.W.A.	Az Much Ass Azz U Want	Released: February 22, 1994
Kokane	Funk Upon a Rhyme	Released: April 12, 1994
Bone Thugs-n-Harmony	Creepin on ah Come Up	Released: June 21, 1994; Chart positions: No. 12 U.S.; RIAA certification: 4× Platinum
Above the Law	Uncle Sam's Curse	Released: July 12, 1994; Chart positions: No. 113 U.S.
Menajahtwa	Cha-licious	Released: August 23, 1994
Bone Thugs-n-Harmony	E. 1999 Eternal	Released: July 25, 1995; Chart positions: No. 1 U.S.; RIAA certification: 4× Platinum
Frost	Smile Now, Die Later	Released: October 24, 1995; Chart positions: No. 119 U.S.
Eazy-E	Str8 off tha Streetz of Muthaphukkin Compton	Released: January 30, 1996; Chart positions: No. 3 U.S.; RIAA certification: Gold
MC Ren	The Villain in Black	Released: April 9, 1996; Chart positions: No. 31 U.S.
Frost	When Hell.A. Freezes Over	Released: July 1, 1997; Chart positions: No. 154 U.S.
Bone Thugs-n-Harmony	The Art of War	Released: July 29, 1997; Chart positions: No. 1 U.S.; RIAA certification: 4× Platinum
MC Ren	Ruthless for Life	Released: June 30, 1998; Chart positions: No. 100 U.S.
Bizzy Bone	Heaven'z Movie	Released: October 6, 1998; Chart positions: No. 3 U.S.; RIAA certification: Gold
Krayzie Bone	Thug Mentality 1999	Released: April 6, 1999; Chart positions: No. 4 U.S.; RIAA certification: Platinum
Bone Thugs-n-Harmony	BTNHResurrection	Released: February 29, 2000; Chart positions: No. 2 U.S.
Layzie Bone	Thug by Nature	Released: March 20, 2001; Chart positions: No. 43 U.S.
Eazy-E	Impact of a Legend	Released: March 26, 2002
Bone Thugs-n-Harmony	Thug World Order	Released: October 29, 2002; Chart positions: No. 12 U.S.

=== Compilation albums ===
Artist	Album	Details
N.W.A	N.W.A and the Posse	Released: November 13, 1989; RIAA certification: Gold
N.W.A	Greatest Hits	Released: July 2, 1996; Chart positions: No. 48 U.S.; RIAA certification: Gold
N.W.A	The N.W.A Legacy, Vol. 1: 1988–1998	Released: March 23, 1999; Chart positions: No. 77 U.S.; RIAA certification: Platinum
Various Artists	The N.W.A Legacy, Vol. 2	Released: August 27, 2002; Chart positions: No. 154 U.S.
N.W.A	The Best of N.W.A: The Strength of Street Knowledge	Released: December 26, 2006; Chart positions: No. 72 U.S.
