= Cold 187um =

American rapper and producer (born 1967)

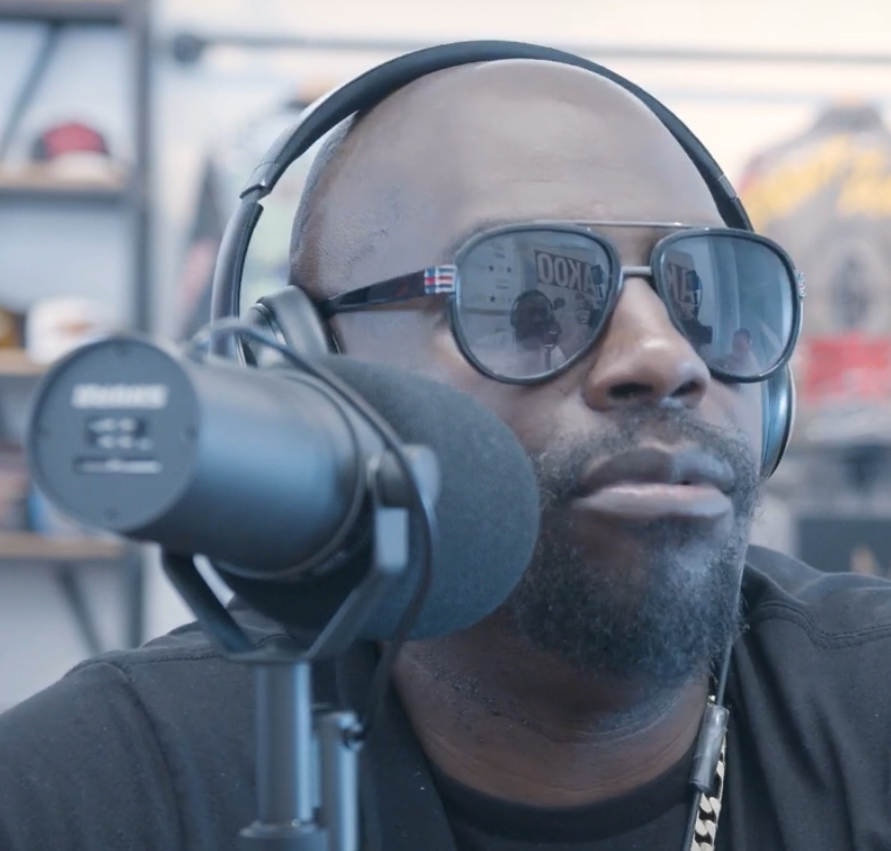
- Hutchison in 2022

Background information
- Also known as: Big Hutch
- Born: Gregory Fernard Hutchison; August 4, 1967 (age 58); Pomona, California, US
- Genres: West Coast hip hop; gangsta rap; funk; G-funk
- Occupations: Rapper; record producer; entrepreneur
- Years active: 1987–present
- Labels: Ruthless; Tommy Boy; Death Row

Gregory Fernard Hutchison (born August 4, 1967), known as Big Hutch and Cold 187um, is an American rapper and producer, and leader of the rap group Above the Law. He currently records for his self-founded label.

== Early life, family and education ==
Hutchison is the son of songwriter Richard Hutchison and the nephew of late R&B singer Willie Hutch.

== Career ==
Above the Law signed to Ruthless Records in late 1989, releasing their debut album, Livin' Like Hustlers, in 1990. The album was overseen and co-produced by producer Dr. Dre, who would soon leave the label and start up Death Row Records, and featured members of the group N.W.A. Hutchinson contributed to the success of Ruthless after Dre's departure and the breakup of N.W.A. During his tenure on the label he produced for Eazy-E's 5150: Home 4 tha Sick and It's On (Dr. Dre) 187um Killa, MC Ren's The Villain in Black among other projects.

Hutch and his group parted ways with Ruthless in 1996. In mid-1999, the producer was brought in by Suge Knight to replace Daz Dillinger as head producer for Death Row Records. During his tenure there, Hutchinson would oversee production on numerous albums. In 2004, Above the Law was put on hold, as Hutchinson was jailed for drug trafficking. Upon his release the group resumed recording and touring. As a solo artist, Hutch released Fresh Out the Pen in August 2008, and both EF U Hutch in November 2010, and Only God Can Judge Me in April 2011, in collaboration with Big Shot Music Group.

In 2011, as Big Hutch, Hutchinson toured with Insane Clown Posse, Twiztid and Blaze Ya Dead Homie as part of the American Psychos Tour in October. Hutchinson was a featured artist on "Where Do We Go From Here?", which was recorded during that tour. Later in the year, it was announced that Hutchinson had signed with Psychopathic Records, and his album The Only Solution was released on October 22, 2012. Hutchinson left Psychopathic in 2013 due to poor sales.

On April 1, 2014, Hutchinson released his self-produced new album titled The Big Hit. Shortly after the release of "The Big Hit" Cali Barnes released "Remember Me", produced by Hutchinson, but the single failed to chart. In August 2015, Cold 187 um was featured on Dr. Dre's album Compton on the track "Loose Cannons". On October 24, 2015, The Hip Hop Foundation released an article on their website titled "5 Legendary Hip Hop Producers You Never Hear About" giving Hutchinson the number one spot. The article credits him for being a legend that pioneered a generation of west coast hip hop sound G-Funk.

In 2016, Netflix Originals released Hip-Hop Evolution. Hutchison appears in episode four: "The Birth of Gangsta Rap". On October 10, 2016, Cold 187 um released The Black Godfather, a double album featuring numerous guest artists.

In 2023, Hutchinson was featured as a playable character in Call of Duty Modern Warfare 2.

== Meaning of "um" in 187um ==
According to an OC Weekly interview with the artist back in 9/7/2016, the "um" in his name stands for "untouchable murder", or to invoke the 7 numeral as "Sevum" like "5th" means "Fifth".

== Discography ==
=== Studio albums ===
- Executive Decisions (1999)
- Live from the Ghetto (2004)
- Fresh Out the Pen (2008)
- Only God Can Judge Me (2011)
- The Only Solution (2012)
- The Big Hit (2014)
- The Black Godfather (2016)
- The Resurrection of Gangster Rap (2021)
- Black December (2022)

=== Mixtapes ===
- From Pomona with Love (2011)

=== Extended plays ===
- EF U Hutch (2010)
- I'm a Muthaphukkin Rider (2022)

== Production credits ==
1992	Eazy-E	"Neighborhood Sniper"	5150: Home 4 tha Sick
1993	Mz Kilo	"All Over a Ho"	Menace II Society soundtrack
1993	Eazy-E	"Any Last Werdz"	It's On (Dr. Dre) 187um Killa
1994	Kokane	Entire album	Funk Upon a Rhyme
1995	Frost	Various tracks	Smile Now, Die Later
1995	Kam	"Givin' It Up"	Made in America
1996	MC Ren	6 tracks	The Villain in Black
1996	Mac Mall	"Opening Doors"	Untouchable
2001	2Pac	3 tracks	Until the End of Time
2001	Tha Dogg Pound	Just Doggin’ (Hutch Remix)	2002
2013	Big Hoodoo	2 tracks ("Crystal Skull" and "Happily Ever After")	Crystal Skull
2014	Shaelyn Rolf	3 tracks ("Tick Tick" "Intoxicated" "Not the Same)	Shaelyn Rolf EP
2014	Cali Barnes	"Remember Me"	Cali Barnes EP
2014	Cold 187 um	Entire album	The Big Hit
2014	Cali Barnes and Shaelyn Rolf	"My Life"	The Drew: No Excuse Just Produce soundtrack
2015	Dr. Dre	"Loose Cannons"	Compton
2016	Cold 187 um	Entire album	The Black Godfather
