= The D.O.C. discography =

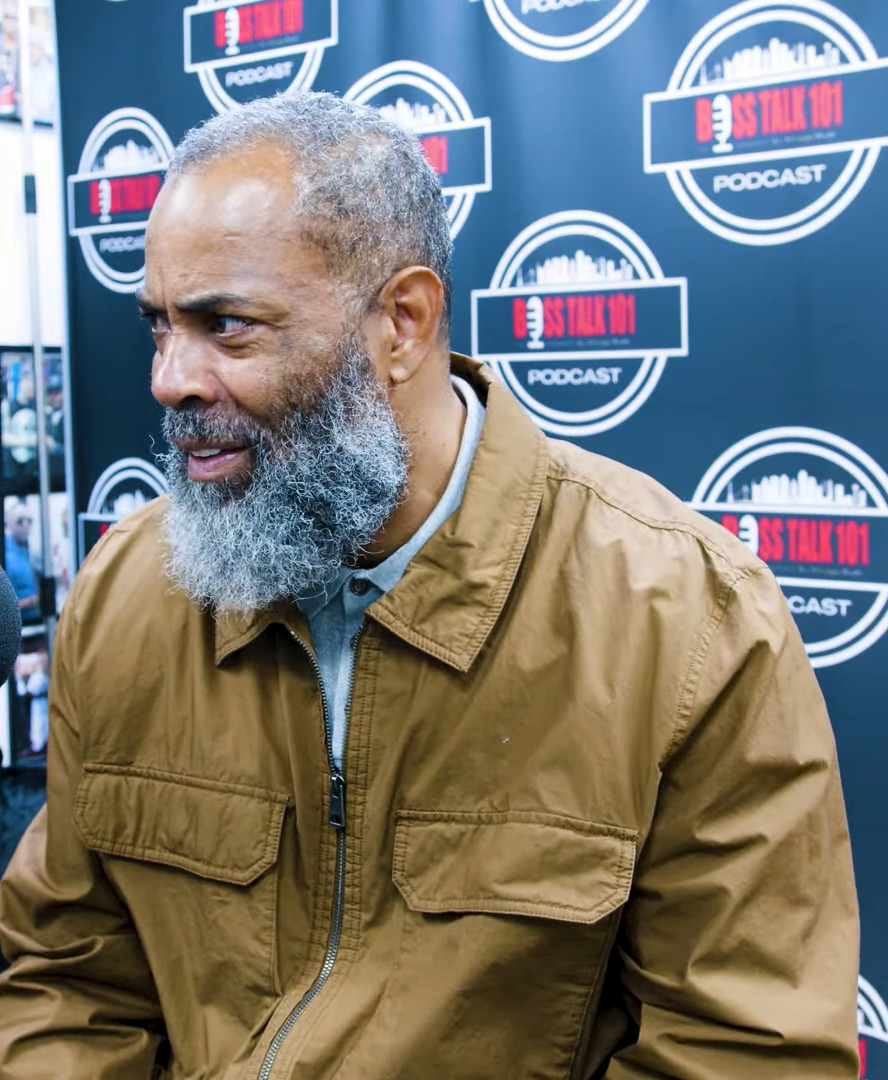
- The D.O.C. in 2025
- Studio albums: 3
- Singles: 7
- Music videos: 7
- Collaborative albums: 1

The discography of the American rapper The D.O.C contains three studio albums and eight singles.

== Solo discography ==
=== Studio albums ===
List of albums with selected chart positions and certifications
Title	Album details	Peak chart positions			Certifications
Title	Album details	US	US R&B	US Indie	Certifications
No One Can Do It Better	Released: July 13, 1989; Label: Ruthless; Format: CD, LP, cassette	20	1	—	RIAA: Platinum
Helter Skelter	Released: January 23, 1996; Label: Giant; Format: CD, cassette	30	5	—	
Deuce	Released: February 25, 2003; Label: Silverback; Format: CD, LP	184	57	6	

=== Singles ===
List of singles, with selected chart positions, showing year released and album name
Title	Year	Peak chart positions					Album
Title	Year	US Bub.	US R&B	US Rap	US Dance Sales	UK	Album
"It's Funky Enough"	1989	—	12	1	24	—	No One Can Do It Better
"The D.O.C. & The Doctor"	1989	—	—	1	—	—	No One Can Do It Better
"The Formula"	1989	—	76	4	—	—	No One Can Do It Better
"Portrait of a Masterpiece"	1989	—	—	—	—	84	No One Can Do It Better
"Mind Blowin'"	1989	—	—	3	—	—	No One Can Do It Better
"Return of Da Livin' Dead"	1995	11	67	9	50	—	Helter Skelter
"The Shit"	2003	—	— (Note: "The Shit" did not enter the Hot R&B/Hip-Hop Songs chart, but peaked at number 53 on the Hot R&B/Hip-Hop Singles Sales chart.)	—	—	—	Deuce
"—" denotes a recording that did not chart or was not released in that territory.

=== Promotional singles ===
List of promotional singles, showing year released and album name
Title	Year	Album
"4 My Doggz"	1996	Helter Skelter

=== Guest appearances ===
List of guest appearances with other performing artists
Title	Year	Other performer(s)	Album
"Parental Discretion Iz Advised"	1989	N.W.A	Straight Outta Compton
"Sa Prize, Pt. 2"	1990	N.W.A	100 Miles and Runnin'
"Don't Drink That Wine"	1991	N.W.A	Niggaz4life
"The $20 Sack Pyramid"	1992	Dr. Dre, Snoop Dogg, Samara, Big Tittie Nickie	The Chronic
"Serial Killa"	1993	Snoop Dogg, RBX, Tha Dogg Pound	Doggystyle
"B.R. Double E.D."	1994	MC Breed	Funkafied
"Ain't Nothing Like Pimpin'"	1995	Too Short, MC Breed	Cocktails
"Cum Clean"	1996	MC Breed	To Da Beat Ch'all
"Bridgette"	1996	various	First Round Knock Out
"Guerilla Pimpin"	1997	MC Breed	Flatline
"Feel It"	1997	Charli Baltimore	Cold As Ice
"Stack Them Bodies"	1999	DFC, Boo Boo Breed	The Whole World's Rotten
"On Da Southside"	2000	K-Rock, 2-Cool, Don P., MC-West	I'm The One
"Legacy"	2016	Cold 187um, Ice Cube	The Black Godfather - Act 'One'
"It's Automatic"	2018	Tha Chill, MC Eiht, Kokane	4Wit80
"Fast Ones"	2023	Codefendants (Ceschi, Sam King, Fat Mike)	This Is Crime Wave
"Rivals"	2026	Codefendants (Ceschi, Sam King, Fat Mike)	LIFERS

== With Fila Fresh Crew ==
=== Extended play ===
Title	Album details
Tuffest Man Alive	Released: 1988; Label: Macola; Format: CD, LP, cassette

=== Singles ===
Year	Title	Album
1988	"I Hate to Go to Work"	Tuffest Man Alive
1988	"Dunk the Funk"	Tuffest Man Alive
1989	"Fear of the Rap"	Tuffest Man Alive

=== Guest appearances ===
Title	Year	Artist	Album
"Dunk the Funk"	1987	N.W.A	N.W.A. and the Posse
"Drink It Up"	1987	N.W.A	N.W.A. and the Posse
"Tuffest Man Alive"	1987	N.W.A	N.W.A. and the Posse
"3 the Hard Way"	1987	N.W.A	N.W.A. and the Posse

== Music videos ==
=== Solo ===
Title	Album
"It's Funky Enough"	No One Can Do It Better
"The D.O.C. & The Doctor"	No One Can Do It Better
"Beautiful But Deadly"	No One Can Do It Better
"The Formula"	No One Can Do It Better
"Mind Blowin'"	No One Can Do It Better
"Return of Da Livin' Dead"	Helter Skelter
"4 My Doggz"	Helter Skelter

=== With Fila Fresh Crew ===
Title	Album
"I Hate To Go To Work"	Tuffest Man Alive

=== Guest appearances ===
Title	Artist	Album
"Alwayz Into Somethin'"	N.W.A	Niggaz4life
"Nuthin' but a 'G' Thang"	Dr. Dre	The Chronic
"Let Me Ride"	Dr. Dre	The Chronic
"Still D.R.E."	Dr. Dre	2001
"That's Gangsta"	Shyne	Shyne
"It's Automatic"	Tha Chill	4Wit80
"Fast Ones"	Codefendants	This Is Crime Wave
