= Dr. Dre production discography =

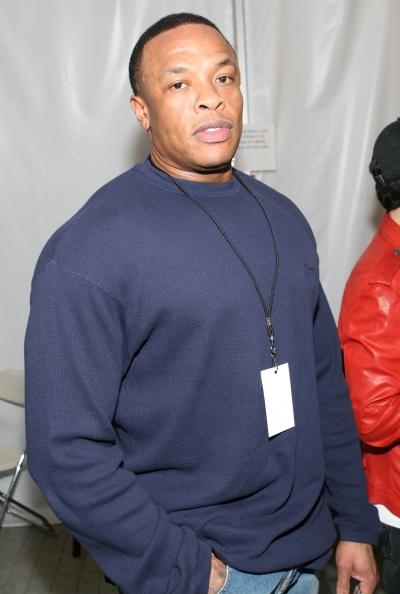
Dr. Dre in 2008

The following list is a discography of production by American rapper and hip-hop producer Dr. Dre. It includes a list of singles produced, co-produced and remixed by year, artist, album and title.

== Singles produced ==
List of singles, with selected chart positions and certifications, showing year released and album name
Year	Title	Peak chart positions										Certifications	Album
Year	Title	US	US R&B	US Rap	CAN	FRA	NL	NZ	SWE	SWI	UK	Certifications	Album
1986	"Boyz-n-the-Hood" (Eazy-E)	50	18	14	—	—	—	—	—	—	—		N.W.A. and the Posse
1988	"Eazy-er Said Than Dunn" (Eazy-E)	—	84	—	—	—	—	—	—	—	—		Eazy-Duz-It
1988	"Is It Love" (J.J. Fad)	92	—	—	—	—	—	—	—	—	—		Supersonic
1988	"Supersonic" (J.J. Fad)	31	—	—	—	—	—	—	—	—	—	US: Gold	Supersonic
1988	"Way Out" (J.J. Fad)	61	—	—	—	—	—	—	—	—	—		Supersonic
1988	"Straight Outta Compton" (N.W.A)	38	—	—	—	—	—	—	—	—	66	US: Platinum	Straight Outta Compton
1988	"Gangsta Gangsta" (N.W.A)	—	91	11	—	—	—	—	—	—	70		Straight Outta Compton
1989	"Eazy-Duz-It" (Eazy-E)	—	—	—	—	—	—	—	—	—	—		Eazy-Duz-It
1989	"We Want Eazy" (Eazy-E)	—	43	7	—	—	—	—	—	—	—		Eazy-Duz-It
1989	"No More Lies" (Michel'le)	7	2	—	—	—	—	—	—	—	—	US: Gold	Michel'le
1989	"Express Yourself" (N.W.A)	—	45	2	—	—	—	—	—	—	26		Straight Outta Compton
1989	"It's Funky Enough" (The D.O.C.)	—	12	1	—	—	—	—	—	—	—		No One Can Do It Better
1989	"The D.O.C. & The Doctor" (The D.O.C.)	—	—	1	—	—	—	—	—	—	—		No One Can Do It Better
1989	"The Formula" (The D.O.C.)	—	76	4	—	—	—	—	—	—	—		No One Can Do It Better
1989	"Mind Blowin'" (The D.O.C.)	—	—	3	—	—	—	—	—	—	—		No One Can Do It Better
1990	"Murder Rap" (Above the Law)	—	—	1	—	—	—	—	—	—	—		Livin' Like Hustlers
1990	"Untouchable" (Above the Law)	—	—	1	—	—	—	—	—	—	—		Livin' Like Hustlers
1990	"Keep Watchin" (Michel'le)	—	65	—	—	—	—	—	—	—	—		Michel'le
1990	"Nicety" (Michel'le)	29	5	—	—	—	—	—	—	—	—		Michel'le
1990	"100 Miles and Runnin'" (N.W.A)	—	51	2	—	—	—	32	—	—	38		100 Miles and Runnin'
1991	"Something In My Heart" (Michel'le)	31	2	—	—	—	—	—	—	—	—		Michel'le
1991	"Appetite for Destruction" (N.W.A)	—	45	2	—	—	—	—	—	—	—		Niggaz4Life
1991	"Alwayz into Somethin'" (N.W.A)	—	37	1	—	—	—	—	—	—	60		Niggaz4Life
1992	"Deep Cover" (Dr. Dre featuring Snoop Dogg)	—	46	4	—	—	—	—	—	—	—		Deep Cover
1992	"Nuthin' but a 'G' Thang" (Dr. Dre featuring Snoop Dogg)	2	1	1	—	—	—	39	—	—	31	US: Platinum	The Chronic
1993	"Fuck wit Dre Day (And Everybody's Celebratin')" (Dr. Dre featuring Snoop Dogg)	8	6	13	—	—	—	49	—	—	59	US: Platinum	The Chronic
1993	"Let Me Ride" (Dr. Dre)	34	34	3	—	—	—	—	—	—	31		The Chronic
1993	"Who Am I? (What's My Name?)" (Snoop Dogg)	8	8	1	—	—	—	4	—	—	20	US: Gold	Doggystyle
1994	"Gin and Juice" (Snoop Dogg)	8	13	1	—	—	—	11	—	—	39	US: Gold	Doggystyle
1994	"Doggy Dogg World" (Snoop Dogg featuring Tha Dogg Pound and The Dramatics)	—	25	4	—	—	—	—	—	—	32		Doggystyle
1994	"Afro Puffs" (The Lady of Rage)	57	5	5	—	—	—	—	—	—	—		Above the Rim
1994	"Natural Born Killaz" (Dr. Dre and Ice Cube)	95	—	—	—	—	—	—	—	—	45	US: Gold	Murder Was the Case
1994	"U Better Recognize" (Sam Sneed featuring Dr. Dre)	—	48	18	—	—	—	—	—	—	—		Murder Was the Case
1995	"Keep Their Heads Ringin'" (Dr. Dre)	10	10	1	—	29	15	3	7	7	25	US: Gold	Friday
1995	"California Love" (2Pac featuring Dr. Dre and Roger Troutman)	1	1	1	51	13	7	1	1	7	6	CAN: Gold; NOR: Gold; US: 2× Platinum	All Eyez on Me
1996	"Been There, Done That" (Dr. Dre)	—	19	—	—	—	—	31	—	—	—		Dr. Dre Presents the Aftermath
1998	"Zoom" (Dr. Dre and LL Cool J)	—	52	—	—	—	—	—	—	—	15		Bulworth
1999	"My Name Is" (Eminem)	36	18	10	38	68	12	4	16	29	2	US: 3× Platinum	The Slim Shady LP
1999	"Bitch Please" (Snoop Dogg featuring Xzibit)	77	26	8	—	—	—	—	—	—	—		No Limit Top Dogg
1999	"Guilty Conscience" (Eminem featuring Dr. Dre)	—	56	—	—	97	21	—	25	—	5	US: Platinum	The Slim Shady LP
1999	"Chin Check" (N.W.A featuring Snoop Dogg)	—	71	1	—	—	—	—	—	—	—		Next Friday
1999	"Still D.R.E." (Dr. Dre featuring Snoop Dogg)	93	32	11	—	29	—	—	—	—	6		2001
2000	"Forgot About Dre" (Dr. Dre featuring Eminem)	25	14	—	—	—	16	26	29	37	7		2001
2000	"The Next Episode" (Dr. Dre featuring Snoop Dogg, Kurupt and Nate Dogg)	23	11	9	—	22	26	—	—	34	3		2001
2000	"The Real Slim Shady" (Eminem)	4	11	7	6	6	6	15	3	2	1	AUS: Gold; BEL: Platinum; FRA: Gold; GER: Gold; NOR: Gold; SWE: Gold; SWI: Gold; US: 7× Platinum; UK: Gold	The Marshall Mathers LP
2000	"Hello" (Ice Cube featuring Dr. Dre and MC Ren)	—	50	—	—	—	—	—	—	—	—		War & Peace Vol. 2 (The Peace Disc)
2000	"X" (Xzibit)	76	36	32	—	73	—	—	42	5	14		Restless
2001	"Let Me Blow Ya Mind" (Eve featuring Gwen Stefani)	2	6	10	29	15	—	7	6	1	4		Scorpion
2001	"Lay Low" (Snoop Dogg featuring Master P, Nate Dogg, Butch Cassidy and Tha Eastsidaz)	50	20	8	—	81	—	—	—	48	—		Tha Last Meal
2001	"Break Ya Neck" (Busta Rhymes)	26	10	21	—	50	13	—	—	20	11		Genesis
2001	"Family Affair" (Mary J. Blige)	1	1	—	—	1	—	2	7	4	—		No More Drama
2001	"Lookin' at You" (Warren G featuring Ms. Toi)	—	76	—	—	—	—	—	—	—	60		The Return of the Regulator
2001	"Bad Intentions" (Dr. Dre featuring Knoc-turn'al)	—	33	—	—	—	—	—	—	—	4		The Wash
2002	"The Knoc" (Knoc-turn'al featuring Dr. Dre and Missy Elliott)	98	67	—	—	—	—	—	—	—	—		L.A. Confidential presents: Knoc-turn'al & Knoc's Landin'
2003	"In da Club" (50 Cent)	1	1	1	1	16	2	1	4	1	3	AUS: 2× Platinum; BEL: Gold; GER: Gold; NZ: Gold; SWE: Gold; SWI: Gold; US: Diamond; UK: Silver	Get Rich or Die Tryin'
2003	"Satisfaction" (Eve)	27	22	—	—	60	87	—	—	—	20		Eve-Olution
2003	"Business" (Eminem)	—	77	25	—	—	9	14	—	—	6	AUS: Gold; US: Gold	The Eminem Show
2003	"Poppin' Them Thangs" (G-Unit)	—	66	—	—	—	27	—	—	—	10	US: Platinum	Beg for Mercy
2004	"The Set Up" (Obie Trice featuring Nate Dogg)	73	—	—	—	—	—	—	—	—	32		Cheers
2004	"Rich Girl" (Gwen Stefani featuring Eve)	7	78	—	12	4	—	3	4	6	4	AUS: Platinum; NZ: Gold; SWE: Gold; US: Gold	Love. Angel. Music. Baby.
2004	"Not Today" (Mary J. Blige featuring Eve)	41	21	—	40	—	—	—	—	—	57	US: Platinum	Love & Life
2004	"Westside Story" (The Game featuring 50 Cent)	93	55	—	—	—	—	—	—	—	—		The Documentary
2004	"Just Lose It" (Eminem)	6	35	7	—	7	5	1	12	1	1	AUS: Platinum; DEN: Platinum; NZ: Platinum; NOR: Gold; US: 2× Platinum	Encore
2004	"How We Do" (The Game featuring 50 Cent)	4	2	2	—	30	5	4	—	8	5	US: Gold	The Documentary
2005	"Ass Like That" (Eminem)	60	93	—	—	—	28	9	—	25	4	US: Platinum	Encore
2005	"Outta Control" (50 Cent featuring Mobb Deep)	6	11	5	6	—	27	12	—	10	7	US: Platinum	The Massacre & Blood Money
2006	"In the Ghetto" (Busta Rhymes featuring Rick James)	—	50	24	—	—	—	—	—	—	—		The Big Bang
2006	"Lost One" (Jay-Z featuring Chrisette Michele)	58	19	10	—	—	—	—	—	—	—		Kingdom Come
2007	"30 Something" (Jay-Z)	—	21	13	—	—	—	—	—	—	—		Kingdom Come
2007	"Boss' Life" (Snoop Dogg featuring Akon)	—	65	—	—	—	—	—	—	—	—		Tha Blue Carpet Treatment
2007	"Barbershop" (Ya Boy)	—	—	—	—	—	—	—	—	—	—		Non-album single
2007	"Straight to the Bank" (50 Cent)	32	30	10	—	38	—	—	53	—	—		Curtis
2007	"U Ain't Goin' Nowhere" (Young Buck featuring LaToiya Williams)	—	57	—	—	—	—	—	—	—	—		Buck the World
2008	"Grow Up" (Bishop Lamont)	—	—	—	—	—	—	—	—	—	—		Non-album single
2009	"Crack a Bottle" (Eminem featuring Dr. Dre and 50 Cent)	1	60	4	1	—	56	6	9	4	3	US: 3× Platinum	Relapse
2009	"I Get It In" (50 Cent)	53	43	16	52	—	—	—	—	—	75		Non-album single
2009	"We Made You" (Eminem)	9	—	19	6	11	—	1	11	4	4	AUS: Platinum; US: 2× Platinum	Relapse
2009	"3 a.m." (Eminem)	32	—	—	24	—	—	—	—	—	56	US: Gold	Relapse
2009	"Old Time's Sake" featuring Dr. Dre (Eminem)	25	115	—	14	—	—	—	—	—	61		Relapse
2012	"New Day" (50 Cent featuring Dr. Dre and Alicia Keys)	79	51	21	43	109	—	—	—	—	—		Street King Immortal
2013	"New Day" (Alicia Keys)	—	10	—	—	174	—	—	—	—	—		Girl on Fire
2016	"Dope" (T.I. featuring Marsha Ambrosius)	121	46	—	—	—	—	—	—	—	—		non-album single
"—" denotes releases that did not chart or receive certification.

== 1985 ==
=== World Class Wreckin' Cru – World Class ===
(Produced with the World Class Wreckin' Cru)

- 01. "The Planet"
- 02. "World Class"
- 03. "Surgery (Remix)"
- 04. "Juice"
- 05. "(Horney) Computer"
- 06. "Gang Bang You're Dead"
- 07. "Lovers" (featuring Mona Lisa Young)

=== Bobby Jimmy and the Critters – Milkshake / Overlapping Waist (12" single) ===
- A1. "Milkshake" {Produced with Arabian Prince}

=== Laylaw – Monster Rapping/Wolfin' (12" single) ===
- 01. "Monster Rapping"
- 02. "Wolfin'"

== 1986 ==
=== World Class Wreckin' Cru – Rapped in Romance ===
- 01. "Mission Possible" {Produced by Lonzo with co-production by Dr. Dre and DJ Yella}
- 02. "He's Bionic" {Co-produced by Lonzo and Shakespere}
- 03. "B.S" {Produced with Lonzo}
- 05. "The Fly" {Produced by Lonzo and co-produced by Shakespere—Dr. Dre credited as producer on First Round Knock Out}
- 06. "World Class Freak" {Produced by Lonzo with co-production by Dr. Dre and DJ Yella}
- 07. "Wreckin Cru Blues" {Produced by Lonzo with co-production by Dr. Dre}

=== C.I.A. – My Posse (12" single) ===
- A1. "My Posse"
- A2. "Jus 4 The Cash $"
- A3. "Ill-legal"

== 1987 ==
=== Various artists – N.W.A. and the Posse ===
- 01. "Boyz-n-the-Hood" – Eazy-E
- 02. "8 Ball" – Eazy-E
- 03. "Dunk the Funk" – The Fila Fresh Crew
- 04. "Scream" – Rappinstine
- 05. "Drink It Up" – The Fila Fresh Crew
- 06. "Panic Zone" – N.W.A
- 07. "L.A. Is the Place" – Eazy-E and Ron-De-Vu
- 08. "Dope Man" – N.W.A
- 09. "Tuffest Man Alive" – The Fila Fresh Crew
- 10. "Fat Girl" – Eazy-E and Ron-De-Vu
- 11. "3 the Hard Way" – The Fila Fresh Crew

(The 1989 re-release replaced "Scream" with N.W.A's "A Bitch Iz a Bitch", produced with DJ Yella).

== 1988 ==
=== J. J. Fad – Supersonic ===
(Produced with DJ Yella/Co-produced by Arabian Prince)

- 01. "Supersonic"
- 02. "Way Out"
- 03. "Blame It on the Muzick"
- 04. "In the Mix"
- 05. "Eenie Meenie Beats"
- 06. "My Dope Intro"
- 07. "Let's Get Hyped"
- 08. "Now Really"
- 09. "Time Tah Get Stupid"
- 10. "Is It Love"

=== Eazy-E – Eazy-Duz-It (Cassette single) ===
- B2. "Compton's N The House / 100% Diss"

{Produced with DJ Yella}

=== Eazy-E – Eazy-Duz-It ===
(Produced with DJ Yella)

- 01. "Still Talkin'"
- 02. "Nobody Move"
- 03. "Ruthless Villain" (feat. MC Ren)
- 04. "2 Hard Mutha's" (feat. MC Ren)
- 05. "Boyz-n-the-Hood (Remix)"
- 06. "Eazy-Duz-It"
- 07. "We Want Eazy" [feat. MC Ren & Dr. Dre]
- 08. "Eazy-Er Said Than Dunn"
- 09. "Radio"
- 10. "No More ?'s"
- 11. "I'mma Break It Down"
- 12. "Eazy-Chapter 8 Verse 10 (B.U.L.L.S.H.I.T.)"

=== Eazy-E – We Want Eazy (Remix) (12" single) ===
(Produced with DJ Yella)

- A1. "We Want Eazy (Remix)" [feat. MC Ren & Dr. Dre]
- B1. "Still Talkin' (Remix)"

(Included on the 2015 re-release of Eazy-Duz-It)

=== N.W.A – Straight Outta Compton ===
(Produced with DJ Yella)

- 01. "Straight Outta Compton"
- 02. "Fuck Tha Police"
- 03. "Gangsta Gangsta"
- 04. "If it Ain't Ruff"
- 05. "Parental Discretion Iz Advised"
- 06. "8 Ball (Remix)"
- 07. "Something Like That"
- 08. "Express Yourself"
- 09. "Compton's N the House"
- 10. "I Ain't tha 1"
- 11. "Dope Man (Remix)"
- 12. "Quiet on tha Set"
- 13. "Something 2 Dance 2"

=== Various artists – Coming to America (soundtrack) ===
- 07. "Comin Correct" – J. J. Fad {Produced with DJ Yella}

== 1989 ==
=== N.W.A – Express Yourself (12" single) ===
(Produced with DJ Yella)

- A1. "Express Yourself" (Extended Mix)
- B1. "Straight Outta Compton" (Extended Mix)
- B2. "A Bitch Iz a Bitch"

=== Michel'le – Michel'le ===
(Co-produced by L.A. Dre)

- 01. "No More Lies" (feat. Dr. Dre)
- 02. "Nicety" (feat. Dr. Dre)
- 03. "If?" (featuring Michael Holmes)
- 04. "Keep Watchin'
- 05. "Something in My Heart
- 06. "100% Woman
- 08. "Never Been in Love"
- 09. "Close to Me"
- 10. "Special Thanks"

=== The D.O.C. – No One Can Do It Better ===
- 01. "It's Funky Enough"
- 02. "Mind Blowin'"
- 03. "Lend Me an Ear"
- 04. "Comm.Blues"
- 05. "Let the Bass Go"
- 06. "Beautiful but Deadly"
- 07. "The D.O.C. and The Doctor"
- 08. "No One Can Do It Better"
- 09. "Whirlwind Pyramid"
- 10. "Comm.2"
- 11. "The Formula"
- 12. "Portrait of a Masterpiece"
- 13. "The Grande Finale" (featuring N.W.A)

=== The D.O.C. - Mind Blowin' 12" ===
- A2. "Mind Blowin' (Remix)"

=== The D.O.C. - The Formula 12" ===
- A1. "The Formula (Funky FM Remix)"

== 1990 ==
=== Above the Law – Livin' Like Hustlers ===
(Produced with Above the Law and Laylaw)

- 01. "Murder Rap"
- 02. "Untouchable"
- 03. "Livin' Like Hustlers"
- 04. "Another Execution"
- 05. "Menace to Society"
- 06. "Just Kickin' Lyrics"
- 07. "Ballin'"
- 08. "Freedom of Speech"
- 09. "Flow On"
- 10. "The Last Song" (featuring N.W.A)

=== The West Coast Rap All-Stars – We're All in the Same Gang 12" ===
- A1. "We're All in the Same Gang"
- A2. "We're All in the Same Gang (Gangster Mix)"
- B2. "Tellin' Time (Mike's Rap)" {Produced with Shock G}

=== Various artists – The Return of Superfly (soundtrack) ===
- 02. "Eazy Street" – Eazy-E

=== N.W.A – 100 Miles and Runnin' ===
(Produced with DJ Yella)

- 01. "100 Miles and Runnin'"
- 02. "Just Don't Bite It"
- 03. "Sa Prize (Part 2)"
- 04. "Real Niggaz"
- 05. "Kamurshol"

== 1991 ==
=== N.W.A – Niggaz4Life ===
(Produced with DJ Yella)

- 01. "Prelude"
- 02. "Real Niggaz Don't Die"
- 03. "Niggaz 4 Life"
- 04. "Protest (Interlude)"
- 05. "Appetite for Destruction"
- 06. "Don't Drink That Wine (Interlude)"
- 07. "Alwayz Into Somethin'" (feat. Admiral D)
- 08. "Message to B.A. (Interlude)"
- 09. "Real Niggaz"
- 10. "To Kill a Hooker (Interlude)"
- 11. "One Less Bitch"
- 12. "Findum, Fuckum, & Flee"
- 13. "Automobile"
- 14. "She Swallowed It"
- 15. "I'd Rather Fuck You"
- 16. "Approach to Danger"
- 17. "1-900-2-Compton (Interlude)"
- 18. "Dayz of Wayback"

=== Jimmy Z – Muzical Madness ===
(Co-produced by Jimmy Z)

- 01. "Prelude" (featuring Dr. Dre)
- 02. "Whatever You Want"
- 03. "Funky Flute" (featuring Dr. Dre)
- 04. "Phone Sexxx"
- 05. "Reeperbahn"
- 06. "Reazons"
- 07. "Who'z Leroy"
- 08. "Crazy You"
- 09. "Watching You"
- 10. "Summertime"
- 11. "Evil"
- 12. "Hip Hop Harmonica"
- 13. "Muzical Madness"

== 1992 ==
=== Po' Broke & Lonely – Funky Vibe (12" single) ===
- A2. "Funky Vibe" (Dr. Dre's Vibe Mix)

=== The Party – Free ===
- 07. "Let's Get Right Down to It" {Co-produced by Colin Wolfe}

=== Various artists – Deep Cover (soundtrack) ===
- 01. "Deep Cover" – Dr. Dre (featuring Snoop Dogg)
- 02. "Love or Lust" – Jewell
- 15. "187um" – Dr. Dre and Snoop Dogg (alternate version of Deep Cover only featured on reissue version)

=== Dr. Dre – The Chronic ===
- 01. "The Chronic" (Intro) (featuring Snoop Dogg)
- 02. "Fuck wit Dre Day (And Everybody's Celebratin')" [featuring Snoop Dogg, Jewell and RBX]
- 03. "Let Me Ride" (featuring Jewell)
- 04. "The Day the Niggaz Took Over" (featuring Daz Dillinger, RBX and Snoop Dogg)
- 05. "Nuthin' but a 'G' Thang" (featuring Snoop Dogg)
- 06. "Deeez Nuuuts" (featuring Daz Dillinger, Snoop Dogg, Nate Dogg and Warren G)
- 07. "Lil' Ghetto Boy" (featuring Snoop Dogg, Daz Dillinger and Nate Dogg)
- 08. "A Nigga Witta Gun"
- 09. "Rat-Tat-Tat-Tat"
- 10. "The $20 Sack Pyramid" (Skit)
- 11. "Lyrical Gangbang" (featuring The Lady of Rage, Kurupt and RBX)
- 12. "High Powered" (featuring RBX, The Lady of Rage and Daz Dillinger)
- 13. "The Doctor's Office" (Skit)
- 14. "Stranded on Death Row" (featuring Bushwick Bill, Kurupt, The Lady of Rage, RBX and Snoop Dogg)
- 15. "The Roach [The Chronic Outro]" (featuring RBX)
- 16. "Bitches Ain't Shit" (featuring Tha Dogg Pound, Snoop Dogg, The Lady of Rage and Jewell)

=== Dr. Dre – Dre Day (12" single) ===
- A3. "Puffin on Blunts and Drankin Tanqueray" (featuring The Lady of Rage & Tha Dogg Pound)
- B1. "Dre Day" (Extended Club Mix) [featuring Snoop Dogg]
- B2. "One Eight Seven" (featuring Snoop Dogg) {alternate version of Deep Cover}

== 1993 ==
=== Various artists – Poetic Justice (soundtrack) ===
- 10. "Niggas Don't Give a Fuck" – Tha Dogg Pound

=== Snoop Dogg – Doggystyle ===
- 01. "Bathtub"
- 02. "G Funk Intro" (featuring The Lady of Rage and George Clinton)
- 03. "Gin and Juice"
- 04. "Tha Shiznit"
- 05. "Lodi Dodi"
- 06. "Murder Was the Case" (featuring Daz Dillinger)
- 07. "Serial Killa" (featuring Tha Dogg Pound, RBX and The D.O.C.)
- 08. "Who Am I (What's My Name)?"
- 09. "For All My Niggaz & Bitches" (featuring Tha Dogg Pound, The Lady of Rage and Lil 1/2 Dead)
- 10. "Ain't No Fun (If the Homies Can't Have None)" [featuring Warren G, Nate Dogg and Kurupt]
- 11. "Doggy Dogg World" (featuring Tha Dogg Pound and The Dramatics)
- 12. "Gz and Hustlas"
- 13. "Pump Pump" (featuring Mr Malik)

== 1994 ==
=== Various artists – Above the Rim (soundtrack) ===
- 10. "Afro Puffs" – The Lady of Rage

=== Various artists – Murder Was the Case (soundtrack) ===
- 01. "Murder Was the Case (Remix)" – Snoop Dogg (featuring Daz Dillinger)
- 02. "Natural Born Killaz" – Dr. Dre and Ice Cube {Co-produced by Sam Sneed}
- 06. "Harvest for the World" – Jewell

== 1995 ==
=== Various artists – Friday (soundtrack) ===
- 02. "Keep Their Heads Ringin'" – Dr. Dre {Co-produced by Sam Sneed}

=== 2Pac – California Love (non-album single) ===
- 01. "California Love" (featuring Dr. Dre and Roger Troutman)

== 1996 ==
=== 2Pac – All Eyez on Me ===
Disc 1:

- 12. "California Love" (Remix) [featuring Dr. Dre and Roger Troutman]

Disc 2:

- 01. "Can't C Me" (featuring George Clinton)

=== Nas – It Was Written ===
- 07. "Nas Is Coming" (featuring Dr. Dre)

=== Various artists – Dr. Dre Presents... The Aftermath ===
- 01. "Aftermath (The Intro)" – RC and Sid McCoy {Produced with Mel-Man}
- 02. "East Coast/West Coast Killas" – Group Therapy {Co-produced by Stu-B-Doo}
- 03. "Shittin' on the World" – Mel-Man
- 04. "Blunt Time" – RBX {Co-produced by Stu-B-Doo}
- 05. "Been There, Done That" – Dr. Dre {Produced with Bud'da}
- 12. "Sexy Dance" – RC {Produced with Bud'da}
- 16. "Fame" – RC {Produced with Glove}

=== Various artists – First Round Knock Out ===
- 03. "Bridgette – The D.O.C.
- 14. "It's Not Over" – Rose Royce

(recorded 1989–1994)

== 1997 ==
=== Scarface – The Untouchable ===
- 13. "Game Over" (featuring Dr. Dre, Ice Cube and Too Short)

=== The Firm – The Album ===
- 01. "Intro" {Produced with Chris "The Glove" Taylor}
- 02. "Firm Fiasco" {Produced with Chris "The Glove" Taylor}
- 04. "Phone Tap" {Produced with Chris "The Glove" Taylor}
- 06. "Firm Family" (featuring Dr. Dre) {produced with Chris "The Glove" Taylor}
- 09. "Fuck Somebody Else" {Produced with Chris "The Glove" Taylor}
- 11. "Untouchable" (featuring Wizard) {produced with Mel-Man}
- 13. "Five Minutes to Flush" {Produced with Chris "The Glove" Taylor}

== 1998 ==
=== Various artists – Bulworth (soundtrack) ===
- 01. "Zoom" – Dr. Dre and LL Cool J

=== Kurupt – Kuruption! ===
Disc 1: The West Coast

- 12. "Ask Yourself a Question" (featuring Dr. Dre)

== 1999 ==
=== Eminem – The Slim Shady LP ===
- 02. "My Name Is"
- 03. "Guilty Conscience" (featuring Dr. Dre) {Produced with Eminem}
- 09. "Role Model" {Produced with Mel-Man}

=== Snoop Dogg – No Limit Top Dogg ===
- 02. "Buck 'Em" (featuring Sticky Fingaz)
- 12. "Bitch Please" (featuring Xzibit and Nate Dogg)
- 18. "Just Dippin'" (featuring Dr. Dre and Jewell)

=== Various artists – Wild Wild West (soundtrack) ===
- 07. "Bad Guys Always Die" – Dr. Dre and Eminem {Produced with Mel-Man}

=== Warren G – Game Don't Wait (non-album single) ===
- 1. "Game Don't Wait" (Remix) [featuring Snoop Dogg, Nate Dogg and Xzibit]

=== Kurupt – Tha Streetz Iz a Mutha ===
- 14. "Ho's a Housewife" (featuring Dr. Dre and Hittman) {Produced with Mel-Man}
  (re-released as "Housewife" on Dr. Dre's album, 2001)

=== Dr. Dre – 2001 ===
(Produced with Mel-Man)

- 01. "Lolo" (Intro)
- 02. "The Watcher"
- 03. "Fuck You" (featuring Devin the Dude and Snoop Dogg)
- 04. "Still D.R.E." (featuring Snoop Dogg)
- 05. "Big Ego's" (featuring Hittman)
- 06. "Xxplosive" (featuring Kurupt, Nate Dogg, Hittman and Six-Two)
- 07. "What's the Difference" (featuring Xzibit and Eminem)
- 08. "Bar One" (Skit)
- 09. "Light Speed" (featuring Hittman)
- 10. "Forgot About Dre" (featuring Eminem)
- 11. "The Next Episode" (featuring Snoop Dogg, Kurupt and Nate Dogg)
- 12. "Let's Get High" (featuring Kurupt, Hittman and Ms. Roq)
- 13. "Bitch Niggaz" (featuring Snoop Dogg, Hittman and Six-Two)
- 14. "The Car Bomb" (Skit)
- 15. "Murder Ink" (featuring Hittman and Ms. Roq)
- 16. "Ed-Ucation" (featuring Eddie Griffin)
- 17. "Some L.A. Niggaz" (featuring Defari, Xzibit, Time Bomb, King T, MC Ren and Kokane)
- 18. "Pause 4 Porno" (Skit)
- 19. "Housewife" (featuring Kurupt and Hittman)
- 20. "Ackrite" (featuring Hittman)
- 21. "Bang Bang" (featuring Knoc-Turn'al and Hittman)

=== Various artists – Next Friday (soundtrack) ===
- 02. "Chin Check" – N.W.A

== 2000 ==
=== Ice Cube – War & Peace Vol. 2 (The Peace Disc) ===
- 01. "Hello" (featuring Dr. Dre and MC Ren) {Produced with Mel-Man}

=== Eminem – The Marshall Mathers LP ===
- 02. "Kill You" {Produced with Mel-Man}
- 05. "Who Knew" {Produced with Mel-Man}
- 08. "The Real Slim Shady" {Produced with Mel-Man}
- 09. "Remember Me" (featuring RBX and Sticky Fingaz) {Produced with Mel-Man}
- 10. "I'm Back" {Produced with Mel-Man}
- 15. "Bitch Please II" (featuring Dr. Dre, Snoop Dogg, Xzibit and Nate Dogg)

=== Xzibit – Restless ===
- 04. "U Know" (featuring Dr. Dre) {Produced with Nottz}
- 05. "X" {Produced with Mel-Man and Scott Storch}
- 13. "Best of Things"

=== Snoop Dogg – Tha Last Meal ===
- 01. "Intro"
- 02. "Hennesey N Buddah" (featuring Kokane) {Produced with Mike Elizondo}
- 04. "True Lies" (featuring Kokane) {Produced with Mike Elizondo}
- 09. "Lay Low" (featuring Master P, Nate Dogg, Butch Cassidy and Tha Eastsidaz) {Produced with Mike Elizondo}

== 2001 ==
=== Eve – Scorpion ===
- 04. "Let Me Blow Ya Mind" (featuring Gwen Stefani) {Produced with Scott Storch}
- 10. "That's What It Is" (featuring Styles P)

=== D12 – Devil's Night ===
- 05. "Nasty Mind" (featuring Truth Hurts)
- 06. "Ain't Nuttin' but Music"
- 11. "Fight Music"
- 18. "Revelation"

=== Bilal – 1st Born Second ===
- 03. "Fastlane"
- 06. "Sally" {Produced with Mel-Man}

=== Mary J. Blige – No More Drama ===
- 02. "Family Affair"

=== Various artists – Training Day (soundtrack) ===
- 04. "Put It on Me" – Dr. Dre and DJ Quik featuring Mimi

=== Various artists – The Wash (soundtrack) ===
- 08. "Holla" – Busta Rhymes
- 15. "Str8 West Coast" – Knoc-Turn'al
- 18. "The Wash" – Dr. Dre and Snoop Dogg {Produced with DJ Pooh}

=== Busta Rhymes – Genesis ===
- 08. "Truck Volume"
- 10. "Break Ya Neck" {Produced with Scott Storch}
- 12. "Holla" (previously released on The Wash)

=== Mack 10 – Bang or Ball ===
- 02. "Hate in Yo Eyes"

=== Nate Dogg – Music and Me ===
- 07. "Your Wife" (featuring Dr. Dre) {Produced with Mike Elizondo}

=== Warren G – The Return of the Regulator ===
- 04. "Lookin' at You" (featuring Ms. Toi)

== 2002 ==
=== Devin the Dude – Just Tryin' ta Live ===
- 02. "It's a Shame" (featuring Pooh Bear)

=== Eminem – The Eminem Show ===
- 03. "Business"
- 17. "Say What You Say" (featuring Dr. Dre)
- 19. "My Dad's Gone Crazy"

=== Eminem – The Eminem Show (Expanded Edition) ===
- 24. "Jimmy, Brian and Mike" {Produced with Mike Elizondo and Eminem}

=== Truth Hurts – Truthfully Speaking ===
- 01. "Push Play" (featuring Dr. Dre)
- 04. "Jimmy"
- 10. "Queen of the Ghetto"

=== Various artists – Austin Powers in Goldmember (soundtrack) ===
- 02. "Miss You" (Dr. Dre Remix) – The Rolling Stones

=== Knoc-Turn'al – L.A. Confidential Presents Knoc-Turn'al ===
- 01. "The Knoc" (featuring Dr. Dre and Missy Elliott)
- 03. "Str8 Westcoast" (Remix) [featuring Warren G, Nate Dogg, Shade Sheist and Xzibit]

=== Tray Deee – The General's List ===
- 07. "Finer Thangzzz" (featuring 40 Glocc and L.V.)

=== Eve – Eve-Olution ===
- 02. "What!" (featuring Truth Hurts)
- 11. "Satisfaction"

=== Xzibit – Man vs. Machine ===
- 08. "Choke Me, Spank Me (Pull My Hair)" [featuring Traci Nelson]
- 09. "Losin' Your Mind" (featuring Snoop Dogg)

=== Jay-Z – The Blueprint 2: The Gift & the Curse ===
- 03. "The Watcher 2" (featuring Dr. Dre, Rakim and Truth Hurts)

== 2003 ==
=== 50 Cent – Get Rich or Die Tryin' ===
- 05. "In da Club" {Co-produced by Mike Elizondo}
- 07. "Heat"
- 08. "If I Can't" {Co-produced by Mike Elizondo}
- 10. "Back Down"

=== 40 Glocc – The Jakal ===
- 14. "Papa Lil Soldier"

=== The D.O.C. – Deuce ===
- 07. "Psychic Pymp Hotline" (featuring Dr. Dre and Mike Lynn)
- 09. "Judgment Day" (featuring Dr. Dre and 6-Two)
- 15. "Mentally Disturbed" (featuring 6-Two)

=== Obie Trice – Cheers ===
- 06. "The Set Up" (featuring Nate Dogg) {Produced with Mike Elizondo}
- 08. "Shit Hits the Fan" (featuring Dr. Dre and Eminem) {Produced with Mike Elizondo}
- 12. "Look in My Eyes" (featuring Nate Dogg) {Produced with Mike Elizondo}
- 15. "Oh!" (featuring Busta Rhymes) {Produced with Mike Elizondo}

=== Mary J. Blige – Love & Life ===
- 04. "Not Today" (featuring Eve)

=== G Unit – Beg for Mercy ===
- 02. "Poppin' Them Thangs" {Produced with Scott Storch}
- 15. "G'd Up" {Produced with Scott Storch}

== 2004 ==
=== Knoc-Turn'al – The Way I Am ===
- 11. "I Like" (featuring Yero Brock)

=== Gwen Stefani – Love. Angel. Music. Baby. ===
- 02. "Rich Girl" (featuring Eve)

=== D12 – D12 World ===
- 18. "American Psycho II" (featuring B-Real) {Produced with Mike Elizondo}

=== Eminem – Encore ===
- 02. "Evil Deeds"
- 03. "Never Enough" (featuring 50 Cent and Nate Dogg) {Produced with Mike Elizondo}
- 06. "Mosh" {Produced with Mark Batson}
- 10. "Rain Man"
- 11. "Big Weenie"
- 13. "Just Lose It" {Produced with Mike Elizondo}
- 14. "Ass Like That" {Produced with Mike Elizondo}
- 20. "Encore/Curtains Down" (featuring Dr. Dre and 50 Cent) {Produced with Mark Batson}

== 2005 ==
=== The Game – The Documentary ===
- 01. "Intro" {Produced with Che Vicious}
- 02. "Westside Story" (featuring 50 Cent) {Produced with Scott Storch}
- 05. "Higher" {Produced with Mark Batson}
- 06. "How We Do" (featuring 50 Cent) {Produced with Mike Elizondo}
- 07. "Don't Need Your Love" (featuring Faith Evans) {Produced by Havoc with additional production by Dr. Dre}
- 10. "Start From Scratch" (featuring Marsha Ambrosius) {Produced with Scott Storch}
- 17. "Don't Worry" (featuring Mary J. Blige) {Produced with Mike Elizondo}

=== 50 Cent – The Massacre ===
(Produced with Mike Elizondo)

- 08. "Outta Control"
- 15. "Gunz Come Out"

=== 50 Cent – The Massacre (Special Edition) ===
- 08. "Outta Control" (Remix)" [featuring Mobb Deep] {Produced with Mike Elizondo}

=== Various artists – Get Rich or Die Tryin' (soundtrack) ===
(Produced with Mike Elizondo and Che Vicious)

- 15. "Talk About Me" – 50 Cent
- 16. "When It Rains It Pours" – 50 Cent

=== Hittman – Hittmanic Verses (mixtape) ===
- 02. "Get Mynz"
- 03. "Last Dayz" {Produced with Mel-Man}
- 08. "Bloww" (featuring Dr. Dre and Knoc-Turn'al) {Produced with Mel-Man}
- 13. "Ass" {Produced with Mel-Man}

(recorded 1999-2000)

== 2006 ==
=== Busta Rhymes – The Big Bang ===
- 01. "Get You Some" (featuring Marsha Ambrosius and Q-Tip) {Produced with Mark Batson}
- 03. "How We Do It Over Here" (featuring Missy Elliott)
- 05. "Been Through the Storm" (featuring Stevie Wonder) {Produced by Sha Money XL with additional production by Dr. Dre}
- 06. "In the Ghetto" (featuring Rick James) {Produced by DJ Green Lantern with additional production by Dr. Dre}
- 07. "Cocaina" (featuring Marsha Ambrosius) {Produced with Mark Batson}
- 09. "Goldmine" (featuring Raekwon) {Produced by Erick Sermon with additional production by Dr. Dre}
- 11. "Don't Get Carried Away" (featuring Nas)
- 15. "Legend of the Fall Offs"

=== Jay-Z – Kingdom Come ===
- 05. "Lost One" (featuring Chrisette Michele) {Produced with Mark Batson}
- 07. "30 Something"
- 11. "Trouble" {Produced with Mark Batson}
- 13. "Minority Report" (featuring Ne-Yo)

=== Snoop Dogg – Tha Blue Carpet Treatment ===
- 09. "Boss' Life" (featuring Akon) {Produced with Mark Batson}
- 12. "Round Here"
- 20. "Imagine" (featuring Dr. Dre and D'Angelo) {Produced with Mark Batson}

=== Snoop Dogg – Boss' Life (single version) ===
- "Boss' Life" (featuring Nate Dogg) {Produced with Mark Batson}

=== Various artists – Eminem Presents: The Re-Up ===
- 18. "Get Low" – Stat Quo

=== Nas – Hip Hop Is Dead ===
- 15. "Hustlers" (featuring The Game and Marsha Ambrosius)

== 2007 ==
=== Ya Boy – Chapter 1: The Rise ===
- 12. "Barbershop" (featuring Bishop Lamont)

=== Young Buck – Buck the World ===
- 08. "Hold On" (featuring 50 Cent) {Produced with Che Vicious}
- 11. "U Ain't Goin' Nowhere" (featuring LaToiya Williams) {Produced with Mark Batson}

=== 50 Cent – Curtis ===
- 06. "Come and Go" (featuring Dr. Dre)
- 10. "Straight to the Bank" {Produced by Ty Fyffe with additional production by Dr. Dre}
- 14. "Fire" (featuring Young Buck and Nicole Scherzinger)

=== Stat Quo – street single ===
- 01. "Here We Go"

== 2008 ==
=== Bishop Lamont – The Reformation ===
- "Grow Up"

=== Bishop Lamont – The Confessional ===
- 19. "The Greatest Trick" {Produced by Mr. Porter with additional production by Dr. Dre}

=== Trick-Trick – The Villain ===
- 09. "Hold On"

== 2009 ==
=== Eminem – Relapse ===
- 01. "Dr. West" (Skit)
- 02. "3 a.m."
- 03. "My Mom"
- 04. "Insane"
- 05. "Bagpipes from Baghdad" {Produced with Trevor Lawrence Jr.}
- 06. "Hello" {Produced with Mark Batson}
- 07. "Tonya" (Skit)
- 08. "Same Song & Dance" {Produced with Dawaun Parker}
- 09. "We Made You" {Produced with Eminem/Additional production by Doc Ish}
- 10. "Medicine Ball" {Produced with Mark Batson}
- 11. "Paul" (Skit)
- 12. "Stay Wide Awake"
- 13. "Old Time's Sake" (featuring Dr. Dre) {Produced with Mark Batson}
- 14. "Must Be The Ganja" {Produced with Mark Batson}
- 15. "Mr. Mathers" (Skit)
- 16. "Déjà Vu"
- 18. "Crack a Bottle" (featuring Dr. Dre and 50 Cent)
- 19. "Steve Berman" (Skit)
- 20. "Underground"

=== Eminem – SiriusXM: Shade 45 (Radio Show) ===
- The Warning

=== 50 Cent – I Get It In (non-album single) ===
- "I Get It In" {Produced with Mark Batson}

=== 50 Cent – Before I Self Destruct ===
- 03. "Death to My Enemies" {Produced with Mark Batson}
- 05. "Psycho" (featuring Eminem)
- 15. "Ok, You're Right" {Produced with Mark Batson}

=== Raekwon – Only Built 4 Cuban Linx… Pt. II ===
- 18. "Catalina" (featuring Lyfe Jennings) {Produced with Mark Batson}
- 20. "About Me" (featuring Busta Rhymes) {Produced with Mark Batson}

=== Eminem – Relapse: Refill ===
- 02. "Hell Breaks Loose" (featuring Dr. Dre) {Produced with Mark Batson}
- 03. "Buffalo Bill" {Produced with Mark Batson}
- 05. "Taking My Ball"
- 06. "Music Box" {Produced with Dawaun Parker}
- 07. "Drop the Bomb on 'Em"

== 2010 ==
=== Eminem – Recovery ===
- 13. "So Bad"
- 18. "Ridaz" (bonus track)

=== Dawaun Parker – The Decision EP ===
- "Lost" (Co-produced by Dawaun Parker)

=== Bishop Lamont – The Shawshank Redemption ===
- 07. "Rain" (featuring Liz Rodrigues)
- 21. "Change Is Gonna Come" (featuring Mike Anthony)

=== Tech N9ne – Bad Season (mixtape) ===
- 09. "Hard Liquor" (featuring Kokane) {Produced with Travis Barker}

== 2011 ==
=== The Game – Purp & Patron (mixtape) ===
Disc 2:

- 07. "Soft Rhodes" (featuring Ashanti)
- 15. "The Ocean" (featuring Dr. Dre) {Produced with Che Vicious}

== 2012 ==
=== T.I. – Fuck da City Up (mixtape) ===
- 18. "Popped Off" (featuring Dr. Dre)

=== Obie Trice – Bottoms Up ===
- 01. "Bottoms Up (Intro)"

=== 50 Cent – New Day (non-album single) ===
- "New Day" (featuring Dr. Dre and Alicia Keys)

=== Xzibit – Napalm ===
- 13. "Louis XIII" (featuring King Tee and Tha Alkaholiks)

=== Alicia Keys – Girl on Fire ===
- 05. "New Day" {Produced with Swizz Beatz}

=== The Game – Jesus Piece ===
- 16. "Dead People" (iTunes Store bonus track)
  (originally intended for The R.E.D. Album)

== 2014 ==
=== Stat Quo – ATLA (All This Life Allows) ===
- 07. "The Way It Be" (featuring Scarface) {Produced with Steve Esterferm}

=== 50 Cent – Animal Ambition ===
- 05. "Smoke" (featuring Trey Songz) {Produced with Mark Batson}

=== Marsha Ambrosius – Friends & Lovers ===
- 07. "Stronger" (featuring Dr. Dre)

== 2015 ==
=== Dr. Dre – Compton ===
- 01. "Intro" {Produced with Focus... and Dontae Winslow}
- 04. "It's All on Me" (featuring Justus and BJ the Chicago Kid) {Produced with Bink}
- 06. "Darkside/Gone" (featuring King Mez, Marsha Ambrosius and Kendrick Lamar) {Produced with Best Kept Secret and D.R.U.G.S Beats}
- 07. "Loose Cannons" (featuring Xzibit, Cold 187um and Sly Pyper) {Produced with Focus... and Trevor Lawrence Jr.}
- 08. "Issues" (featuring Ice Cube, Anderson .Paak and Dem Jointz) {Produced with Focus..., Curt Chambers, Trevor Lawrence Jr. and Theron Feemster}
- 09. "Deep Water" (featuring Kendrick Lamar and Justus) {Produced with Focus..., Cardiak, DJ Dahi & Dem Jointz}
- 10. "One Shot One Kill" (Jon Connor featuring Snoop Dogg) {Produced with Focus... and Trevor Lawrence Jr.}
- 16. "Talking to My Diary" {Produced with DJ Silk and Choc}

== 2016 ==
=== T.I. – Dope (non-album single) ===
- "Dope" (featuring Marsha Ambrosius) {Produced with Sir Jinx}

== 2017 ==
=== Eminem – Revival ===
- 06 . Remind Me (Intro) {Produced with Trevor Lawrence Jr. and Neff-U}

== 2018 ==
=== Anderson .Paak – Oxnard ===
- 04 . Who R U? {Produced with Mell, Dem Jointz and Brissett}
- 08 . Mansa Musa (featuring Dr. Dre and Cocoa Sarai) {Produced with Mell}
- 12 . Cheers (featuring Q-Tip) {Produced with Mell, Focus... and Q-Tip}
- 14 . Left to Right {Produced with Mell and Jason Pounds}

== 2020 ==
=== Eminem – Music to Be Murdered By ===
- 01 ."Premonition" (Intro) {Produced with Dawaun Parker, Eminem, Luis Resto and Mark Baston}
- 04 . "Alfred" (Interlude) {Produced with Andre "Briss" Brissett and Dawaun Parker}
- 11 . "Stepdad" (Intro)
- 14 . "Never Love Again" {Produced with Dawaun Parker, Dem Jointz, Eminem and Trevor Lawrence Jr.}
- 15 . "Little Engine" {Produced with Dawaun Parker, Erik "Blu2th" Griggs and Trevor Lawrence Jr.}
- 16 . "Lock It Up" {Produced with Dawaun Parker, Erik "Blu2th" Griggs and Trevor Lawrence Jr.}
- 20 . "Alfred" (Outro) {Produced with Andre "Briss" Brissett and Dawaun Parker}

=== Eminem – Music to Be Murdered By – Side B (Deluxe edition) ===
- 12 ."She Loves Me" {Produced with Dawaun Parker, Erik "Blu2th" Griggs and Trevor Lawrence Jr}
- 14 ."Discombobulated" {Produced with S1, Mark Baston, Dawaun Parker, Lonestarrmuzik, Trevor Lawrence Jr and franO}

== 2021 ==
=== Dr. Dre – Grand Theft Auto: The Contract ===
- 01. "Gospel" (featuring Eminem) {Produced with Listen2KÖACH}
- 02. "The Scenic Route" (featuring Rick Ross and Anderson .Paak) {Produced with Phonix}
- 03. "Black Privilege" {Produced with Bink!}
- 04. "ETA" (featuring Snoop Dogg, Busta Rhymes and Anderson .Paak) {Produced with J. Lbs}
- 05. "Fallin' Up" (featuring Thurz and Cocoa Sarai) {Produced with Dem Jointz}
- 06. "Diamond Mind" (featuring Nipsey Hussle and Ty Dolla $ign) {Produced with Dem Jointz, Mike & Keys and The Alchemist}

== 2022 ==
=== Various artists – Elvis (soundtrack) ===
- 04. "The King and I" – Eminem & CeeLo Green {Produced with Eminem}

=== Eminem – Curtain Call 2 ===
Disc 2:

- 07. "Is This Love ('09)" [featuring 50 Cent] {Produced with Trevor Lawrence Jr, Mark Batson and Eminem}

=== DJ Khaled – God Did ===
- 03. "Use This Gospel (Remix)" [featuring Kanye West & Eminem] {Produced with The ICU}

== 2023 ==
=== Various artists – Creed III (soundtrack) ===
- 04. "Adonis Interlude (The Montage)" – J. Cole

== 2024 ==
=== Marsha Ambrosius – Casablanco ===
- 01. "Smoke" {Produced with Dem Jointz, Focus, Marsha Ambrosius and Erik "Blu2th" Griggs}
- 02. "Tunisian Nights" {Produced with Dem Jointz, Marsha Ambrosius and Erik "Blu2th" Griggs}
- 03. "One Night Stand" {Produced with Marsha Ambrosius and Erik "Blu2th" Griggs}
- 04. "Cloudy With A Chance Of... Real" {Produced with Dem Jointz, Focus, Marsha Ambrosius and Erik "Blu2th" Griggs}
- 05. "Greedy" {Produced with Focus, Marsha Ambrosius and Erik "Blu2th" Griggs}
- 06. "Self Care/Wrong Right" {Produced with Phonix., DJ Khalil and Marsha Ambrosius}
- 07. "Wet" {Produced with Focus, Marsha Ambrosius and Erik "Blu2th" Griggs}
- 08. "Thrill Her" {Produced with Marsha Ambrosius and Erik "Blu2th" Griggs}
- 09. "The Greatest" {Produced with Focus, Dem Jointz, Marsha Ambrosius, Trevor Lawrence Jr. and Erik "Blu2th" Griggs}
- 10. "Best I Could Find" {Produced with Marsha Ambrosius}
- 11. "Music Of My Mind" {Produced with Focus, Dem Jointz, Marsha Ambrosius and Erik "Blu2th" Griggs}

=== Eminem – The Death of Slim Shady (Coup de Grâce) ===
- 07. "Lucifer" (featuring Sly Pyper) {Produced with Callus}
- 10. "Road Rage" (featuring Dem Jointz & Sly Pyper) {Produced with Dem Jointz}

=== Snoop Dogg – Missionary ===
- 01. "Fore Play" (featuring BJ the Chicago Kid) {Produced with The ICU}
- 02. "Shangri-La" {Produced with Sam Sneed, Sire and Agent}
- 03. "Outta da Blue" (featuring Dr. Dre and Alus) {Produced with Dem Jointz, BoogzDaBeast and FNZ}
- 04. "Hard Knocks" (Produced with Corparal, Self B True and Focus...)
- 05. "Gorgeous" (featuring Jhené Aiko) {Produced with Blu2th, Preach Bal4 and Fredwreck}
- 06. "Last Dance with Mary Jane" (featuring Tom Petty and Jelly Roll) {Produced with The ICU}
- 07. "Pressure" (featuring Dr. Dre and K.A.A.N.) {Produced with Focus... and Mell Beets}
- 08. "Another Part of Me" (featuring Sting) {Produced with The ICU}
- 09. "Skyscrapers" (featuring Method Man and Smitty) {Produced with Sam Sneed, Sire and Agent}
- 10. "Fire" (featuring Cocoa Sarai) {Produced with Fredwreck and Focus...}
- 11. "Gunz n Smoke" (featuring 50 Cent and Eminem) {Produced with C.S. Armstrong}
- 12. "Sticcy Situation" (featuring K.A.A.N. and Cocoa Sarai) {Produced with The ICU}
- 13. "Now or Never" (featuring Dr. Dre and BJ the Chicago Kid) {Produced with Eric Hudson and Eric Ezra Murdock}
- 14. "Gangsta Pose" (featuring Dem Jointz, Stalone and Fat Money) {Produced with J. LBS, Mell Beets and Dem Jointz}
- 15. "The Negotiator" {Produced with Sam Sneed, Sire, Agent and Dem Jointz}
- 07. "Thank You" (digital bonus track) {Produced with The ICU}

== 2025 ==
=== Xzibit – Kingmaker ===
- 06. "Leave Me Alone" (Feat. Dr. Dre & Ty Dolla $ign) {Produced with Swizz Beatz}

=== Eminem - Stans (The Official Soundtrack) ===
- 10. "Everybody's Looking At Me"

== See also ==
- Love for Sale, an unreleased album by Bilal, for which Dr. Dre assisted in producing
