= Return of Da Livin' Dead =

"Return Of Da Livin' Dead"

Single by The D.O.C.

from the album Helter Skelter
- Released: October 31, 1995
- Recorded: 1995
- Genre: Hip hop, Horrorcore, G-funk
- Length: 3:34
- Label: Giant; Warner Bros.
- Songwriter: The D.O.C.
- Producer: The D.O.C.

The D.O.C. singles chronology
| "Mind Blowin'" (1989) | "Return Of Da Livin' Dead" (1995) | "4 My Doggz" (1996) |

"Return Of Da Livin' Dead" is a single by American rapper The D.O.C. from his 1996 album Helter Skelter. The single was released on Halloween 1995 on CD, cassette, and 12" formats. It spent 14 weeks on the US Top Rap Songs chart, peaking at #9. The song also charted on the US Bubbling Under 100, US R&B/Hip-Hop, and US Dance/Electronic Billboard charts. A horror-themed video was made to promote the song.

== Background ==
"Return of Da Livin' Dead" was produced by The D.O.C. himself; the song samples The D.O.C.'s previous hit "It's Funky Enough" which was produced by Dr. Dre and contains a sample of "Misdemeanor" by Foster Sylvers.

Both the music video for "Return of Da Livin' Dead" and the intro track on Helter Skelter feature the D.O.C. dying in a car accident (which mimicks his real-life near-death wreck) and emerging from his own grave to perform the song. Horror imagery is used throughout the music video.

== Track listing ==
US 12" Vinyl Single

A side

1. Return Of Da Livin' Dead (Remix) - 4:31
2. From Ruthless 2 Death Row (Do We All Part) (Remix) - 3:52
3. Return Of Da Livin' Dead (Remix Instrumental) - 4:31

B side

1. Return Of Da Livin' Dead (Clean Remix) - 4:31
2. From Ruthless 2 Death Row (Do We All Part) (Clean Remix) - 2:58
3. From Ruthless 2 Death Row (Do We All Part) (Remix Instrumental) - 3:51

US Cassette Single

1. Return Of Da Livin' Dead - 3:34
2. From Ruthless 2 Death Row (Do We All Part) - 4:26

== Charts ==
| Chart (1995) | Peak Position |
|---|---|
| US Bubbling Under Hot 100 (Billboard) | 11 |
| US Hot R&B/Hip-Hop Songs (Billboard) | 67 |
| US Rap Songs (Billboard) | 9 |
| US Dance/Electronic Singles (Billboard) | 50 |
