= Zig-Zag (company) =

Brand of cigarette rolling papers

Zig~Zag
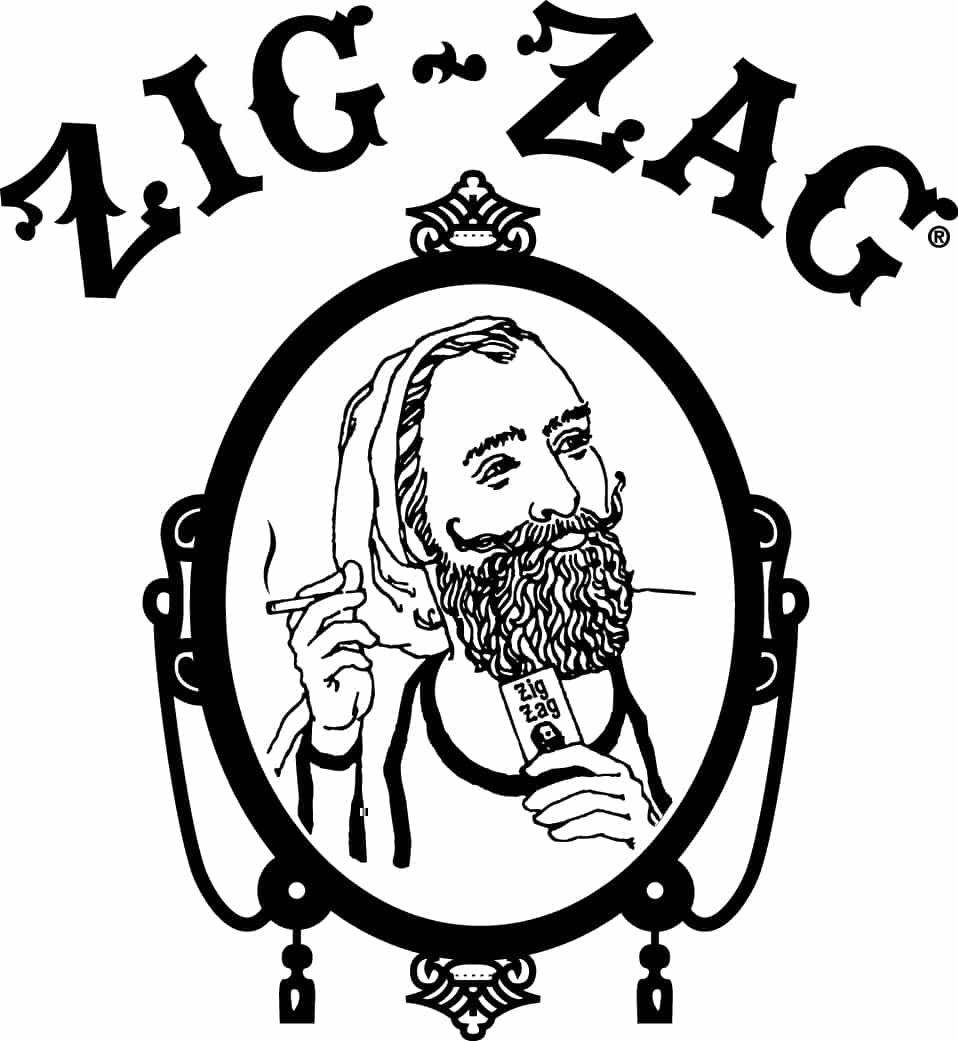
- Industry: Rolling papers; Food, Beverage, Tobacco; Manufacturing
- Founded: 1855; 171 years ago
- Founder: Maurice Braunstein; Jacques Braunstein
- Headquarters: France
- Website: zigzag.com

Zig~Zag is a brand of rolling papers that originated in France. Zig~Zag produces primarily hand-rolled tobacco-related products such as cigarette rolling papers, cigarette tubes and rolling accessories. The Zig-Zag brand produces primarily hand-rolled tobacco-related products such as cigarette rolling papers, cigarette tubes and rolling accessories.

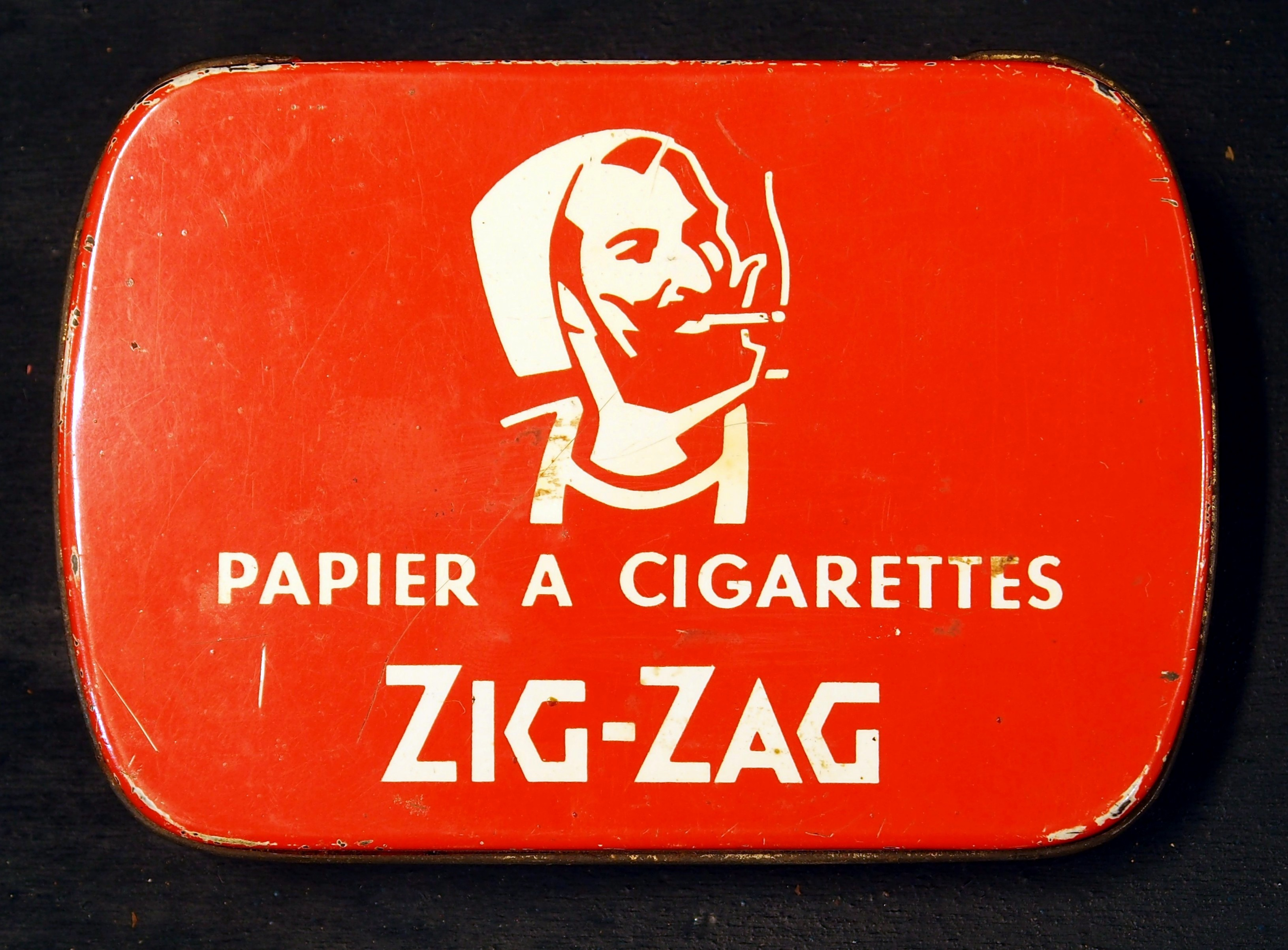
Rolling tin

== History ==
The company was founded by Maurice and Jacques Braunstein. Based in Paris, in 1882 the company built the Papeterie de Gassicourt, a cigarette paper production plant near the town of Mantes-la-Jolie. In 1894, they invented the process of "interleaving" rolling papers. They called their papers Zig-Zag after the zigzag alternating packaging process. In 1900, Zig~Zag was awarded a gold medal at the Universal Exposition in Paris.

Success led to expansion in 1919 to a new mill in Thonon-les-Bains. During World War II, the company's original facility in Mantes-la-Jolie was destroyed and at war's end, all production was shifted to the Thonon factory.

With the death of Jacques Braunstein, in the 1950s Zig-Zag was sold to a partnership of the Group Bolloré and competitor JOB. In 2000, Zig-Zag became part of Republic Technologies of which Group Bolloré owns 19 percent.

American company Turning Point Brands, Inc. acquired North American distribution rights for Zig Zag products in 1997. In 2021, Zig Zag and Turning Point announced they would be collaborating and launching a studio, Zig Zag Studios.

== Marketing ==
=== The "Zig-zag man" ===
The zouave soldier portrayed on the front of Zig-Zag products is colloquially known as the "Zig-Zag man". The choice of a member of this French North African regiment as a Zig-Zag icon originates from a folk story about an incident in the battle of Sevastopol. When the soldier's clay pipe was destroyed by a bullet, he attempted to roll his tobacco using a piece of paper torn from a musket cartridge.

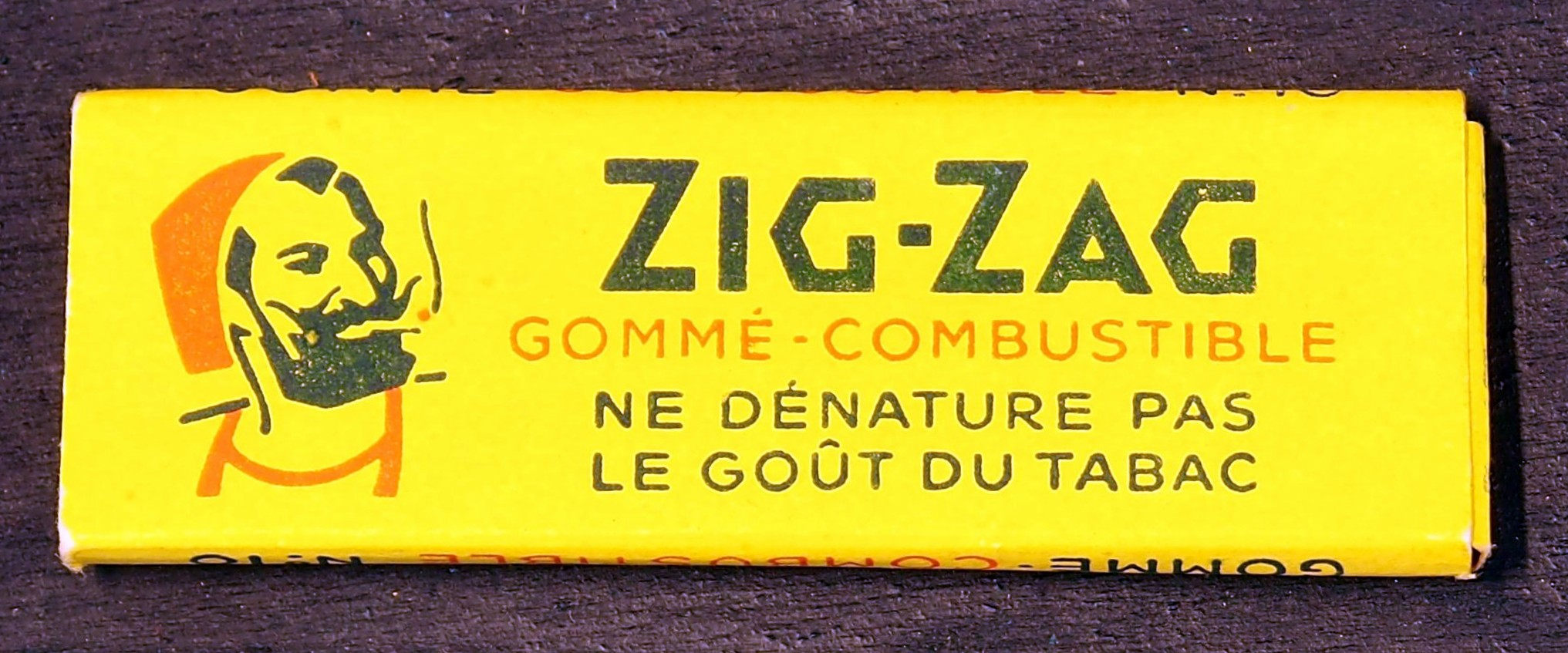

== In popular culture ==
- Zig-Zag rolling papers went on to inspire the single cover of We Want Eazy by Eazy-E
- Zig-Zag rolling papers went on to inspire the album cover for The Chronic by Dr. Dre.
- Referenced in chorus of the Afroman song Crazy Rap.
- Zig-Zag rolling papers are referenced in the Black Stone Cherry song "White Trash Millionaire."
- Zig-Zag rolling papers are also mentioned in the song "The Way I Am" by American rapper Eminem.

== See also ==
- List of rolling papers
