= The Formula (song) =

Single by The D.O.C.

from the album No One Can Do It Better
- Released: 1989
- Recorded: 1989
- Genre: Hip hop; G-funk
- Length: 4:12
- Label: Atlantic/Ruthless
- Songwriter: Tracy Curry
- Producer: Dr. Dre

The D.O.C. singles chronology
"The D.O.C. & The Doctor" (1989)	"The Formula" (1989)	"Portrait of a Masterpiece" (1989)

Music video
- "The D.O.C. - The Formula (Official Video)" on YouTube

"The Formula" is a song by American rapper The D.O.C. from his 1989 debut album No One Can Do It Better. It was released as the third single to support the album and reached #4 on the Hot Rap Songs and #76 on the Hot R&B/Hip-Hop Songs charts in April 1990. "The Formula" has been seen as the song that invented G-funk.

== Background ==
"The Formula" was produced by Dr. Dre and contains samples from Marvin Gaye's "Inner City Blues (Make Me Wanna Holler)", from his 1971 album What's Going On. The remix of the song features a lengthy instrumental outro.

== Music video ==
The music video for "The Formula" was shot before The D.O.C.'s car accident. It begins with Dr. Dre and Eazy-E in a studio where musicians come in for an audition but get turned down; the two complain about the experience, finding it increasingly difficult to locate "the perfect rapper". In the video, Dre plays a scientist, and is implied to be biologically modifying the D.O.C. in a method similar to Frankenstein's monster; this seems to be in order to create the perfect rapper, rather than finding him through the initially shown auditions. Throughout the video as more progress is made the D.O.C's shows more and more signs of life; at the very end a pair of headphones are put on his head and he sits up and eventually gets on his feet.

== Track listing ==
US 12" Vinyl Single

A side

1. "The Formula" (Funky FM Mix) - 5:37
2. "The Formula" (Instrumental) - 4:07

B side

1. "Whirlwind Pyramid" - 3:16
2. "The Formula" - 4:11

== Charts ==
Chart (1990)	Peak position
US Hot R&B Singles (Billboard)	76
US Hot Rap Singles (Billboard)	4
