= Helter Skelter (The D.O.C. album) =

Studio album by the D.O.C.
- Released: January 23, 1996
- Recorded: 1995
- Studio: D.A.R.P Studios (Atlanta, Georgia)
- Genre: Gangsta rap
- Length: 69:40
- Labels: Giant; Warner Bros.
- Producers: The D.O.C. (also exec.), Erotic D

The D.O.C. chronology
No One Can Do It Better (1989)	Helter Skelter (1996)	Deuce (2003)

Singles from Helter Skelter
- 1. "Return of Da Livin' Dead" Released: October 31, 1995; 2. "4 My Doggz" Released: 1996

Alternative cover
- Inside the booklet of Helter Skelter

Professional ratings
Review scores
Source	Rating
AllMusic	2.5/5 stars
The Rolling Stone Album Guide	2/5 stars
The Source	3/5 stars

Helter Skelter is the second studio album by the D.O.C.; released on January 23, 1996. This album was an attempt at making a comeback following the car crash which severely damaged his vocal cords. The album was widely ignored, and has even been discredited by D.O.C himself. The name of the album is a reference to Charles Manson's idea of the Beatles' "Helter Skelter" prophesying the end of the world.

The title and concept behind this album were originally developed by Dr. Dre as a collaborative effort between him and Ice Cube, titled Heltah Skeltah. At that time however, the D.O.C. had become disillusioned with Death Row Records and Dre, having received no payment for his work ghostwriting at Death Row. So in late 1994, D.O.C. decided to leave Death Row and headed to Atlanta, Georgia. Taking lyrics he had already written for Heltah Skeltah, he recorded Helter Skelter, keeping the name to spite Dre. His lyrics were inspired by the writings of Milton William Cooper.

It was his last album recorded for Warner Music Group, the only major music company for which he worked, this time it was recorded for Giant Records imprint of Warner Bros. Records label.

== Track listing ==
All tracks produced by Erotic D, except where noted.

All tracks are written by The D.O.C., except where noted.

No.	Title	Writer(s)	Producer(s)	Length
1.	"Intro" (featuring Eddie Griffin)			3:21
2.	"Return of Da Livin' Dead"		The D.O.C.	3:34
3.	"From Ruthless 2 Death Row (Do We All Part)"			4:26
4.	"Secret Plan"		The D.O.C.	5:36
5.	"Komurshell (Mo' Hair)" (featuring Mario Latrell)	Erotic D, The D.O.C.		2:21
6.	"4 My Doggz"			4:27
7.	".45 Automatic" (featuring Jamal and Passion)			3:58
8.	"Sonz o' Light"			4:04
9.	"Bitchez"			5:13
10.	"Interlude" (featuring Voodoo Einstein)			5:02
11.	"Da Hereafter"		The D.O.C.	4:48
12.	"Erotix Shit" (featuring Jamal, T-Double, DFC, MC Breed, Mz.Allan and Erotic D)			5:04
13.	"Welcome to the New World"			2:51
14.	"Killa Instinc"			3:36
15.	"Komurshell"	Erotic D		1:01
16.	"Brand New Formula"			4:32
17.	"Outro"			1:08
Total length:				69.40

Bonus track
No.	Title	Length
18.	"Crazy Bitchez"	4:38

== Samples ==
- "Return of Da Livin' Dead" - Contains a sample of "It's Funky Enough" by the D.O.C.
- "From Ruthless 2 Death Row (Do We All Part)" - Contains a sample of "Children's Story" by Slick Rick and a sample of "For the Love of You" by the Isley Brothers
- "Secret Plan" contains a sample of "Black Sabbath" by Black Sabbath
- "4 My Doggz" - Contains a sample of "The Chronic (Intro)" by Dr. Dre and a sample of "It's Funky Enough" by the D.O.C.
- "Bitchez"- Contains a sample of "Body Heat" by Quincy Jones
- "Brand New Formula" - Contains a sample of "Inner City Blues (Makes Me Wanna Holler)" by Marvin Gaye
- "Da Hereafter" - Contains a sample of "Burning Love Breakdown" by Peter Brown

== Singles ==
Single information
"Return of Da Livin' Dead"
- Released: 1995
- B-side: "From Ruthless to Death Row (Do We All Part)"
"4 My Doggz"
- Released: 1996 (Promotional)
- B-side: "4 My Doggz (Instrumental)"

== Chart positions ==
Chart (1996)	Peak position
Billboard 200	30
Top R&B/ Hip-Hop Albums	5
