= Mind Blowin' (The D.O.C. song) =

Single by The D.O.C.

from the album No One Can Do It Better
- Released: 1989
- Recorded: 1989
- Genre: West Coast hip hop
- Length: 3:35
- Label: Ruthless; Atlantic
- Songwriter: The D.O.C.
- Producer: Dr. Dre

The D.O.C. singles chronology
| "Portrait of a Masterpiece" (1989) | "Mind Blowin'" (1989) | "Return of Da Livin' Dead" (1995) |

"Mind Blowin'" is a song by American rapper The D.O.C., released as a single and featured as the second track on his 1989 debut album No One Can Do It Better. The song spent fourteen weeks on the US Hot Rap Songs chart, peaking at #3 on April 20, 1991. "Mind Blowin'" was released on cassette and 12" formats; a music video featuring the remixed version of "Mind Blowin'" was also released.

== Background ==
The single features "Mind Blowin'" and "Portrait of a Masterpiece" remixed by Dr. Dre and C.J. Macintosh, respectively. "Mind Blowin'" was produced by Dr. Dre and samples "Mind Blowing Decisions" by Heatwave; The remix was created by Dre after the D.O.C.'s car accident. "Portrait of a Masterpiece" samples Fred Wesley and The J.B.'s's "Blow Your Head" and was released as its own single, reaching #84 on the UK Singles Chart.

== Track listing ==
US 12" Vinyl Single

A side

1. Mind Blowin' (Remix) - 4:26

B Side

1. Portrait Of A Master Piece (Remix) - 5:59

== Charts ==
| Chart (1991) | Peak Position |
|---|---|
| US Hot Rap Singles (Billboard) | 3 |
