= No One Can Do It Better =

Studio album by the D.O.C.
- Released: July 13, 1989
- Recorded: 1989
- Studio: Audio Achievements (Torrance, California)
- Genres: West Coast hip-hop; gangsta rap; G-funk
- Length: 48:25
- Labels: Ruthless; Atlantic
- Producer: Dr. Dre

The D.O.C. chronology
| No One Can Do It Better (1989) | Helter Skelter (1996) |

Singles from No One Can Do It Better
- 1. "It's Funky Enough" Released: June 16, 1989; 2. "The D.O.C. & the Doctor" Released: October 5, 1989; 3. "The Formula" Released: 1989; 4. "Portrait of a Masterpiece" Released: 1989; 5. "Mind Blowin’" Released: 1989

No One Can Do It Better is the first solo album by the D.O.C., released on July 13, 1989, by Ruthless Records and Atlantic Records. It reached no. 1 on the US Top R&B/Hip-Hop Albums chart for two weeks, while peaking in the Top 20 on the Billboard 200 chart. The album was certified Gold by the RIAA three months after it was released, and Platinum on April 21, 1994. It was the only solo album the D.O.C. recorded before a car accident resulted in a crushed larynx and permanently changed voice. In recent years, however, he has been undergoing vocal surgery. He would not release another album until 7 years later, with Helter Skelter (1996), released by Giant Records. "The Formula" has been seen as the song that invented G-funk.

== Album information ==
Idolizing East Coast acts such as Run-DMC and Public Enemy, the D.O.C. always showed more of a lyrical style, not talking about guns, drugs and violence. The album received a Parental Advisory sticker because of the final track on the album ("The Grand Finalé"). Most of the songs were influenced and sampled from funk artists such as Marvin Gaye, Parliament, and Funkadelic, but one track in particular was influenced by other genres, "Beautiful but Deadly," a rock-hip hop track, influenced by Run-DMC with a heavy guitar riff throughout the song (it borrows from Funkadelic's Cosmic Slop).

The members of N.W.A contributed to the album. It was produced by Dr. Dre, with Eazy-E being the executive producer. Dre, Ice Cube, MC Ren and Eazy all provide vocals for "The Grand Finalé", while Ren also provides vocals for "Comm. 2". DJ Yella performs on "Comm. Blues," "Comm. 2," and "The Grand Finalé" as a drummer.

No One Can Do It Better also features additional vocals by Krazy Dee (who also co-wrote the N.W.A song "Panic Zone" from N.W.A. and the Posse), J. J. Fad, Yomo & Maulkie and Michel'le, who were all part of Ruthless as well. Andre "L.A. Dre" Bolton and Stan "The Guitar Man" Jones, who play keyboards and guitar on some of the tracks respectively, also worked for the label.

== Critical reception ==
Professional ratings
Review scores
| Source | Rating |
|---|---|
| AllMusic | 5/5 stars |
| Robert Christgau | B |
| Q | 3/5 stars |
| The Rolling Stone Album Guide | 4/5 stars |
| The Source | 5/5 stars |
| Sputnikmusic | 3/5 |

From contemporary reviews, music critic Robert Christgau of The Village Voice said that the first three songs have music that is funky, multi-dimensional, and engaging, but the rest of the album's funk diminishes and leaves listeners having to focus on D.O.C.'s inferior lyrics. Daniel Weizmann of LA Weekly called the D.O.C. a good rapper whose rhymes "spring out like menacing jacks in the box just when you think he's about tread over the same old rap cliches." Weizmann noted that No One Can Do It Better has "bravado and loathing and deep sexual phobias (like almost all other rap records today)" while it still had "grace and elocution and literary richness." Weizmann also praised Dr. Dre, declaring him "a sound-collage artist to a degree no other producer in rap even touches" and that "If the rappers in front of Dre weren't so often obscene, and if the act of sampling and mixing were taken with the slightest bit of seriousness as an art, I'm positive Dre would be considered the Phil Spector of his generation." J.D. Considine wrote in The Baltimore Sun praised the album, stating that "what really gives this album an edge is the fact that he never pulls his punches, infusing each track with an impressive ferocity".

In a retrospective review, AllMusic stated, "It's a shame that the D.O.C. never got the chance for a proper follow-up, but in No One Can Do It Better, he at least has one undeniable masterpiece."

== Track listing ==
All tracks are written by the D.O.C. and were produced by Dr. Dre.

| No. | Title | Length |
|---|---|---|
| 1. | "It's Funky Enough" | 4:29 |
| 2. | "Mind Blowin'" | 3:35 |
| 3. | "Lend Me an Ear" | 3:20 |
| 4. | "Comm. Blues" (featuring Michel'le) | 2:22 |
| 5. | "Let the Bass Go" | 3:41 |
| 6. | "Beautiful but Deadly" | 5:10 |
| 7. | "The D.O.C. & the Doctor" | 4:06 |
| 8. | "No One Can Do It Better" | 4:50 |
| 9. | "Whirlwind Pyramid" | 3:45 |
| 10. | "Comm. 2" (featuring MC Ren) | 1:20 |
| 11. | "The Formula" | 4:11 |
| 12. | "Portrait of a Masterpiece" | 2:30 |
| 13. | "The Grand Finalé" (featuring N.W.A) | 4:40 |
| Total length: | | 47:59 |

Notes

- The "Real Gone" edition is basically the same master, with the bass amped, and treble lowered. "Comm. Blues" is also edited at the intro ("8 ball piss").

== Cut tracks ==
- "Bridgette" – cut from the album because of sexual content, released in 1996 as part of the Dr. Dre compilation First Round Knock Out

== Singles ==
Single information
"It's Funky Enough"
- Released: June 16, 1989
- B-side: "No One Can Do It Better"
"The D.O.C. & the Doctor"
- Released: October 5, 1989
- B-side: "SomethingTaBumpInYaCar"
"The Formula"
- Released: 1989
- B-side: "Whirlwind Pyramid"
"Mind Blowin'"
- Released: 1989
- B-side: "Portrait of a Masterpiece (Remix)"
"Portrait of a Masterpiece"
- Released: 1989 (UK & Germany)
- B-side:Portrait of a Masterpiece (CJ's Ed-Did-It Mix)

== Charts ==
=== Weekly charts ===
| Chart (1989) | Peak position |
|---|---|
| Billboard 200 | 20 |
| Top R&B/Hip Hop Albums | 1 |

=== Year-end charts ===
| Chart (1989) | Peak position |
|---|---|
| US Top R&B/Hip Hop Albums (Billboard) | 49 |

== Certifications ==
| Region | Certification | Certified units/sales |
|---|---|---|
| United States (RIAA) | Platinum | 1,000,000^{^} |
^{^} Shipments figures based on certification alone.

== See also ==
- List of number-one R&B albums of 1989 (U.S.)
