= The D.O.C. & The Doctor =

Single by The D.O.C.

from the album No One Can Do It Better
- Released: October 5, 1989
- Recorded: 1989
- Studio: Audio Achievements; Torrance, California
- Genre: West Coast hip hop
- Length: 4:06
- Label: Ruthless; Atlantic
- Songwriter: Tracy Curry
- Producer: Dr. Dre

The D.O.C. singles chronology
"It's Funky Enough" (1989)	"The D.O.C. & The Doctor" (1989)	"The Formula" (1989)

"The D.O.C. & The Doctor" is the second single by American rapper The D.O.C. and the seventh track on his 1989 debut album No One Can Do It Better. The song spent fourteen weeks on the Hot Rap Songs chart, including three weeks in the chart's top position. The single was released commercially on cassette and 12" formats. A music video for "The D.O.C. & The Doctor" was released and features Dr. Dre.

== Background ==
"The D.O.C. & The Doctor" was produced by Dr. Dre and samples "Good Old Music" by Funkadelic. The interlude "Somethingtabumpinyacar" is not included on No One Can Do It Better and is exclusive to the 12" single. "Portrait of a Masterpiece" samples Fred Wesley and The J.B.'s's "Blow Your Head"; it would later be released as its own single and reached No. 84 on the UK Singles Chart.

== Track listing ==
US 12" Vinyl Single

A side

1. "The D.O.C. & The Doctor" (Noisy Mix) - 4:49
2. "Somethingtabumpinyacar" - 3:22

B side

1. "The D.O.C. & The Doctor" - 4:06
2. "Portrait Of A Master Piece" - 2:30

== Charts ==
Chart (1989–90)	Peak Position
US Rap Songs (Billboard)	1
