= The Chronic =

1992 studio album by Dr. Dre

Studio album by Dr. Dre
- Released: December 15, 1992
- Recorded: April–June 1992
- Studios: Death Row (Los Angeles, California)
- Genres: West Coast hip-hop; gangsta rap; G-funk
- Length: 62:52
- Labels: Death Row; Priority; Interscope
- Producers: Dr. Dre Chris "The Glove" Taylor Daz Dillinger Colin Wolfe, Warren G

Dr. Dre chronology
The Chronic (1992)	Concrete Roots (1994)

Singles from The Chronic
- 1. "Nuthin' but a 'G' Thang" Released: January 19, 1993; 2. "Dre Day" Released: May 8, 1993; 3. "Let Me Ride" Released: August 28, 1993

The Chronic is the debut studio album by American rapper and producer Dr. Dre. It was released on December 15, 1992, by his record label Death Row Records along with Interscope Records and distributed by Priority Records. The recording sessions took place at Death Row Studios in Los Angeles and at Bernie Grundman Mastering in Hollywood. As much as it was a breakout album for Dr. Dre, The Chronic also functioned as a launching pad to introduce Snoop Dogg (then Snoop Doggy Dogg) and is sometimes referred to as a collaborative effort by the duo, with Snoop featured on 12 of 16 of its tracks.

The Chronic was Dr. Dre's first solo album after he departed the West Coast hip hop group N.W.A and its label Ruthless Records over a financial dispute. It includes insults towards Ruthless Records and its owner, former N.W.A member and assembler Eazy-E. In addition to featuring many appearances by Snoop, The Chronic also introduced Tha Dogg Pound rappers Daz Dillinger and RBX (two of Snoop's cousins), as well as Kurupt and Snoop's early group 213. The album's title derives from a slang term for high-grade cannabis, and its cover is a homage to Zig-Zag rolling papers. In 2023, to celebrate its 30th anniversary, the album was reissued by Dr. Dre's current label Aftermath Entertainment, Death Row Records, and Interscope Records.

The Chronic reached number three on the Billboard 200 and has been certified triple platinum with sales of three million copies in the United States, making Dre one of the top ten best-selling American performing artists of 1993. The Chronic spent eight months in the Billboard Top 10. The album's three singles became top ten Billboard singles. "Nuthin' but a 'G' Thang" reached number two on the Billboard Hot 100 and number one on the Hot Rap Singles and Hot R&B Singles charts.

Dr. Dre's production popularized the G-funk subgenre within gangsta rap. The Chronic has been widely regarded as one of the most important and influential albums of the 1990s and one of the best-produced hip-hop albums. In 2019, the album was selected by the Library of Congress for preservation in the National Recording Registry as "culturally, historically, or aesthetically significant".

== Music ==
=== Production ===
The production on The Chronic was seen as innovative and ground-breaking, and received universal acclaim from critics. AllMusic commented on Dr. Dre's efforts, "Here, Dre established his patented G-funk sound: fat, blunted Parliament-Funkadelic beats, soulful backing vocals, and live instruments in the rolling basslines and whiny synths" and that "For the next four years, it was virtually impossible to hear mainstream hip-hop that wasn't affected in some way by Dre and his patented G-funk." Unlike other hip hop acts (such as The Bomb Squad) that sampled heavily, Dr. Dre only utilized one or few samples per song. In Rolling Stone's The Immortals – The Greatest Artists of All Time, where Dr. Dre was listed at number 56, Kanye West wrote on the album's production quality: "The Chronic is still the hip-hop equivalent to Stevie Wonder's Songs in the Key of Life. It's the benchmark you measure your album against if you're serious."

Jon Pareles of The New York Times described the production, writing "The bottom register is swampy synthesizer bass lines that openly emulate Parliament-Funkadelic; the upper end is often a lone keyboard line, whistling or blipping incessantly. In between are wide-open spaces that hold just a rhythm guitar, sparse keyboard chords." Pareles observed that the songs "were smoother and simpler than East Coast rap, and [Dr. Dre and Snoop Dogg] decisively expanded the hip-hop audience into the suburbs." Until this point, mainstream hip hop had been primarily party music (for example, Beastie Boys) or pro-empowerment and politically charged (for example, Public Enemy or X-Clan), and had consisted almost entirely of samples and breakbeats. Dr. Dre ushered in a new musical style and lyrics for hip hop. The beats were slower and mellower, samples from late 1970s and early 1980s funk music. By mixing these early influences with original live instrumentation, a distinctive genre known as G-funk was created.

=== Lyrics ===
"Fuck wit Dre Day"
The diss track conveys an aggressive production style, as well as critical lyrics aimed at rappers Eazy-E, Luke Campbell and Tim Dog.

The album's lyrics caused some controversy, as the subject matter included sexism and violent representations. It was noted that the album was a "frightening amalgam of inner-city street gangs that includes misogynist sexual politics and violent revenge scenarios". Most of the N.W.A members were addressed on the album; Eazy-E and Ice Cube were dissed on the second single "Fuck wit Dre Day", while MC Ren was dissed on the album's intro. Dr. Dre's dissing of former bandmate, Eazy-E, resulted in vicious lyrics, which were mainly aimed at offending his enemy with homosexual implications, although it was noted to have "a spirited cleverness in the phrasing and rhymes; in other words, the song is offensive, but it's creatively offensive".

Snoop Dogg, who had a significant role on the album, was praised for his lyrics and flow, and it was stated that, "Coupled with his inventive rhymes, Snoop's distinctive style made him a superstar before he'd even released a recording of his own" and that his involvement was as important to the album's success as its production. Touré of The New York Times remarks that "While Snoop delivers rhymes delicately, the content is anything but. Growing up poor, often surrounded by violence, and having served six months in the Wayside County jail outside of Los Angeles (for cocaine possession) gave Snoop Dogg experiences upon which he draws." Snoop Dogg later commented on the "reality" of his lyrics, stating, "My raps are incidents where either I saw it happen to one of my close homies or I know about it from just being in the ghetto. I can't rap about something I don't know. You'll never hear me rapping about no bachelor's degree. It's only what I know and that's that street life. It's all everyday life, reality."

Snoop Dogg also spoke on the surprise of him performing on every song, "When I listen back to The Chronic album, I'm like, how the fuck was I on damn near every song? I was whoopin' niggas! They would be going home to go get chicken, I'd be in that motherfucker all night. If Dre even had half of a beat or had the drums, I'd write some shit to the drums and come up with a melody. Before you know it, I'm on a song."

Sheldon Pearce for Pitchfork wrote, "Snoop was at the center of a writer's room that Dre had taken to calling the Death Row Inmates: The D.O.C., rapper-producer Daz Dillinger and RBX (two of Snoop's cousins), Kurupt, Lady of Rage (who Dre flew in from Manhattan), Snoop's group 213 with Dre's stepbrother Warren G and a little-known singer named Nate Dogg, and the First Lady of Death Row, the R&B vocalist Jewell. This oddball crew convened at Dre's Calabasas mansion and the Solar studios with musicians Colin Wolfe and Chris "The Glove" Taylor, smoking, bonding, writing, and recording, punching in and exchanging ideas. Dre gave shape to L.A.'s present and future. His dispatch from inside a city in transition not only furthered its sense of place in the world beyond but helped affect the place it was becoming."

Dre's Chronic cowriter, multi-instrumentalist Colin Wolfe, told Wax Poetics in 2014, "At the same time [Dre and I] were like, 'We need to do some P-Funk–sounding shit, We wanted to make a real Parliament-Funkadelic album."

== Singles ==
Three singles were released from the album: "Nuthin' but a 'G' Thang", "Fuck wit Dre Day" and "Let Me Ride".

"Nuthin' but a 'G' Thang" was released as the first single on November 19, 1992. It peaked at number two on the Billboard Hot 100 and number one on the Hot R&B/Hip-Hop Singles & Tracks and Hot Rap Singles. It sold over a million copies and the Recording Industry Association of America (RIAA) certified it Platinum on March 24, 1993. The song was nominated for Best Rap Performance by a Duo or Group at the 1994 Grammy Awards, but lost to Digable Planets' "Rebirth of Slick (Cool Like Dat)". Steve Huey of AllMusic named it "the archetypal G-funk single" and added "The sound, style, and performances of "Nuthin' but a 'G' Thang" were like nothing else on the early-'90s hip-hop scene." He praised Snoop Dogg's performance, stating "[Snoop Dogg's] flow was laconic and relaxed, massively confident and capable of rapid-fire tongue-twisters, but coolly laid-back and almost effortless at the same time". It was voted in a VH1 poll as the 13th best song of the 1990s.

"Fuck wit Dre Day (and Everybody's Celebratin')" was released as the second single on May 20, 1993, and like the previous single, it was a hit on multiple charts. It reached number eight on the Billboard Hot 100 and number six on the Hot R&B/Hip-Hop Singles & Tracks. It sold over 800,000 units and the RIAA certified it Gold on October 8, 1993. Allmusic writer Steve Huey stated that the song was "a classic hip-hop single", citing Dr. Dre's production as "impeccable as ever, uniting his signature whiny synth melodies with a halting, descending bass line, a booming snare, and soulful female vocals in the background" and alluded to Snoop Dogg, stating "Attitude was something Snoop had by the boatload, his drawling, laid-back delivery projecting unassailable control – it sounded lazy even though it wasn't, and that helped establish Snoop's don't-give-a-damn persona." The track contains direct insults to rappers East coast rapper Tim Dog, 2 Live Crew member Luke, and Dre's former accomplices Eazy-E & Ice Cube.

"Let Me Ride" was released as a cassette single on September 13, 1993. It experienced moderate success on the charts, reaching number 34 on the Billboard Hot 100 and number three on the Hot Rap Singles. The song won Dr. Dre Best Rap Solo Performance at the 1994 Grammy Awards. On this song and "Nuthin but a "G" Thang", Time magazine noted that Dr. Dre's verses were delivered with a "hypnotically intimidating ease" and made the songs feel like "dusk on a wide-open L.A. boulevard, full of possibility and menace".

== Album cover ==
The album cover was heavily inspired by the "We Want Eazy" single cover (which was also intended to be a tribute to Zig-Zag Cigarette rolling papers by Zig-Zag. Zig-Zag rolling papers are commonly known in cannabis culture to be used to roll up cannabis).

== Critical reception ==
Contemporary professional reviews
Review scores
Source	Rating
Chicago Tribune	2.5/4 stars
Entertainment Weekly	A+
Los Angeles Times	3/4 stars
Rolling Stone	4/5 stars
Select	2/5 medals
The Source	4.5/5 stars
Q	2/5 stars
USA Today	3.5/4 stars
The Village Voice	C+

In a contemporary review for Rolling Stone, Havelock Nelson wrote that the album "drops raw realism and pays tribute to hip-hop virtuosity". Entertainment Weekly said that it "storms with rage, strolls with confidence, and reverberates with a social realism that's often ugly and horrifying". Matty C of The Source claimed that Snoop Dogg's "Slick Rick-esque style" produces "new ground for West Coast MCs" and that the album is "an innovative and progressive hip-hop package that must not be missed." Edna Gundersen of USA Today found "Dre's prowess as beat-master and street preacher" to be "undeniable". Jonathan Gold of the Los Angeles Times wrote that, although the rappers lack "quick wit" and "rhythmic virtuosity", Dre's artistry is "on a par with Phil Spector's or Brian Wilson's". Gold argued that, because Dre recreates rather than samples beats and instrumental work, the finished album's fidelity is not inflected by that of "scratchy R&B records that have been played a million times", unlike productions from East Coast hip hop.

Greg Kot was less enthusiastic in the Chicago Tribune, deeming The Chronic superficial, unrefined entertainment, while writing that "Dre combines street potency with thuggish stupidity in equal measure." Village Voice critic Robert Christgau dismissed it as "sociopathic easy-listening" and "bad pop music" whose innovation—Dre's departure from sampling—is not inspired by contemporary P-Funk, but rather blaxploitation soundtracks, which led him to combine preset bass lines with imitations of "Bernie Worrell's high keyb sustain, a basically irritating sound that in context always signified fantasy, not reality—stoned self-loss or, at a best Dre never approaches, grandiose jive." He felt that the brutal lyrical threats were vague and lacked detail, but that Snoop Dogg rhymed "drolly" and less dully than Dre. Select's Adam Higginbotham opined that The Chronic was not as strong as releases from other gangster rap artists such as Ice Cube and Da Lench Mob and found it neither as "musically sharp, nor as lyrically smart as the latter". His review concluded that the album sounded like "all the pedestrian bits from The Predator", but that it was still better than anything Eazy-E had released. Trouser Press noted that "all of Dre's production wizardry can't mask the nasty misogyny that is essential to his mythos."

In a retrospective piece, Jon Pareles from The New York Times said that The Chronic and Snoop Dogg's Doggystyle "made the gangsta life sound like a party occasionally interrupted by gunplay". AllMusic's Steve Huey compared Dr. Dre to his inspiration, George Clinton, stating "Dre's just as effortlessly funky, and he has a better feel for a hook, a knack that improbably landed gangsta rap on the pop charts". Rhapsody writer Brolin Winning named the album as "an untouchable masterpiece of California Gangsta Rap" and that it had "track after track of G-Funk gems". In Rolling Stone's 500 Greatest Albums of All Time, it was noted that "Dre funked up the rhymes with a smooth bass-heavy production style and the laid-back delivery of then-unknown rapper Snoop Doggy Dogg." Time magazine's Josh Tyrangiel states that Dr. Dre created "a sound that defined early 90s urban L.A. in the same way that Motown defined 60s Detroit". Laura Sinagra, writing in The Rolling Stone Album Guide (2004), said that The Chronic "features system-busting Funkadelic beats designed to rumble your woofer while the matter-of-fact violence of the lyrics blows your smoke-filled mind".

=== Accolades ===
Retrospective professional reviews
Review scores
Source	Rating
AllMusic	5/5 stars
Blender	4/5 stars
The Encyclopedia of Popular Music	5/5 stars
Mojo	5/5 stars
MusicHound R&B	4.5/5 stars
Pitchfork	10/10
The Rolling Stone Album Guide	5/5 stars
Spin Alternative Record Guide	8/10
XXL	5/5

In 1994, "Nuthin' but a "G" Thang" and "Let Me Ride" were nominated at the 36th Grammy Awards, with the latter winning Best Rap Solo Performance for Dr. Dre. That year, readers of Hip Hop Connection voted it the fourth best album of all time, leading the magazine to speculate, "In a few years' time, it could even be remembered as the best rap album of all time."

The Chronic was included in Vibe magazine's list of the 100 Essential Albums of the 20th Century, and the magazine later included it in their list of the Top 10 Rap Albums of All Time, dubbing it a "decade-defining opus". The record was voted as one of the top 10 pop albums of the 1990s by the music writers of The Associated Press. The record was ranked eighth in Spin magazine's "90 Greatest Albums of the '90s", and in 2005, it was ranked at number thirty-five in their list of the "100 Greatest Albums, 1985–2005". Rolling Stone ranked The Chronic at number 138 on their list of the "500 Greatest Albums of All Time", and at 37 in their 2020 update. In 2005, MTV Networks listed The Chronic as the third greatest hip hop album in history. The following year, Time magazine named it as one of "The All-Time 100 Albums". In a retrospective issue, XXL magazine awarded The Chronic a perfect "XXL" rating. The Source, who originally gave the album a rating of 4.5 out of 5 mics in 1993, would later include it in their list of the 100 Best Rap Albums; in 2008, the magazine's former editor Reginald Dennis remarked that he "would have given it a five" in retrospect—the magazine's editors had a strict rule forbidding five-mic ratings at the time—and that "no one could have predicted the seismic shift that this album would produce". The Chronic is listed in the book 1001 Albums You Must Hear Before You Die.

== Commercial performance ==
The Chronic debuted and peaked at number three on the Billboard 200 in its first week. By 2015, the album had sold 5.7 million copies in the United States, and was certified triple Platinum by RIAA on November 3, 1993. It is Dr. Dre's second-bestselling album, as his follow-up album, 2001, was certified sextuple Platinum. The album first appeared on music charts in 1993, peaking on the Billboard 200 at number three, and peaking on Top R&B/Hip-Hop Albums at number one. The Chronic spent eight months in the Billboard Top 10. The album's three singles became top ten Billboard singles. "Nuthin' but a "G" Thang" peaked at number two on the Billboard Hot 100 and at number one on both the Hot Rap Singles and Hot R&B Singles charts. "Fuck Wit Dre Day (And Everybody's Celebratin')" became a top ten single on four different charts, including the Hot R&B Singles (number 6) and the Hot 100 (number 8).

The Chronic didn't chart on the UK Albums Chart until 2000. It re-entered the charts in 2003, peaking on the Ireland Albums Top 75 at number 48, and on the UK Albums Top 75 in 2004 at number 43. As of 2015, it has sold 260,814 copies there.

== Legacy ==
Comparison of Zig-Zag rolling papers with The Chronic album cover

Having split from N.W.A, Dr. Dre's first solo album established him as one of the biggest hip hop stars of his era. Yahoo! Music writer S.L. Duff wrote of the album's impact on his status in hip hop at the time, stating "Dre's considerable reputation is based on this release, alongside his production technique on Snoop's Doggystyle" and his early work with N.W.A. Whatever one thinks of the over-the-top bravado rapping, the tracks and beats Dre assembled are beyond reproach". The Chronic brought G-funk to the mainstream – a genre defined by slow bass beats and melodic synthesizers, topped by P-Funk samples, female vocals, and a laconic, laid-back lyrical delivery referred to as a "lazy drawl". The album takes its name from a slang term for premium grade cannabis, chronic. The album cover is an homage to Zig-Zag rolling papers. Robert Christgau said that, although he "can't stand" it, he respects The Chronic "for its influence and iconicity".

The album launched the careers of West Coast hip hop artists, including Snoop Doggy Dogg, Daz Dillinger, Kurupt, Nate Dogg, and Warren G, Dr. Dre's stepbrother – all of whom pursued successful commercial careers. The Chronic is widely regarded as the album that re-defined West Coast hip hop, demonstrated gangsta rap's commercial potential as a multi-platinum commodity, and established G-funk as the most popular sound in hip hop music for several years after its release, with Dr. Dre producing major albums that drew heavily on his production style. The album's success established Death Row Records as a dominant force in 1990s hip hop. It has been re-released three times, first as a remastered CD, then as a remastered DualDisc with enhanced stereo and four videos, and in 2009 as "The Chronic Re-Lit" with a bonus DVD containing a 30-minute interview and 7 unreleased tracks. On April 20, 2020, the album was distributed across all major streaming services, as it had previously been an Apple Music exclusive since 2015.

However, on March 13, 2022, the album (along with several other Death Row albums) was removed from streaming services, with speculation that Snoop Dogg (who had acquired the label the previous month) wanted to turn the albums into NFTs. In January 2023, it was reported that as part of a deal with Universal Music Group and Shamrock Holdings for his music assets, the masters for the album were set to transfer from Death Row back to Dre in August of the same year, with the masters then being transferred to UMG as part of the deal. The following month, Dre announced that he has regained control of rights to the album (through his company ARY, Inc.) and restored the album to streaming services through the album's original distributor, Interscope Records.

== Track listing ==
All songs produced by Dr. Dre.

No.	Title	Songwriter(s)	Performer(s)	Samples	Length
1	"The Chronic (Intro)"	Andre Young; Calvin Broadus; Colin Wolfe	Snoop Doggy Dogg; Dr. Dre	"Impeach the President" by The Honey Drippers; "Get Out of My Life, Woman" by Solomon Burke; "Funky Worm" by Ohio Players; "Country Cooking" by Jim Dandy; "The Shalimar" by Gylan Kain; "Colour Me Funky" by Parliament	1:57
2	"Fuck wit Dre Day (And Everybody's Celebratin')" (Note: All album art lists it as "___ wit Dre Day".)	Young; Broadus; Wolfe; David Spradley; Garry Shider; George Clinton	First verse: Dr. Dre; Second verse: Snoop Doggy Dogg; Interlude: RBX; Third verse: Snoop Doggy Dogg; Dr. Dre; Outro: Snoop Doggy Dogg; Outro vocals: Jewell	"Atomic Dog" by George Clinton; "(Not Just) Knee Deep" by Funkadelic; "Funkentelechy", "The Big Bang Theory", "Aqua Boogie (A Psychoalphadiscobetabioaquadoloop)" by Parliament	4:52
3	"Let Me Ride"	Young; Broadus; Clinton; Bernie Worrell; Eric Collins; William Collins	Verses: Dr. Dre; Refrain: Snoop Doggy Dogg; Vocals: Ruben, Jewell	"Mothership Connection (Star Child)", "Swing Down, Sweet Chariot (Live)" by Parliament; "Kissing My Love" (Drums) by Bill Withers; "Funky Drummer" (Drums) by James Brown	4:21
4	"The Day the Niggaz Took Over"	Young; Broadus; Collins; Delmar Arnaud; Lawrence Parker; Toni Colandreo	Chorus: Snoop Doggy Dogg, RBX; First verse: Daz Dillinger; Second verse: Dr. Dre; Third verse: RBX; Fourth verse: Daz Dillinger; Outro: Snoop Doggy Dogg	Sampled from the LA uprising documentary, titled "Birth of a Nation 4x29x92", in which was directed by Matthew McDaniels.; "Love's Gonna Get'cha (Material Love)" by Boogie Down Productions	4:33
5	"Nuthin' but a 'G' Thang"	Young; Broadus; Frederick Knight; Leon Haywood; Tracy Curry	Dr. Dre, Snoop Doggy Dogg	"I Want'a Do Something Freaky to You" by Leon Haywood; "Uphill (Peace of Mind)" by Frederick Knight; "B Side Wins Again" by Public Enemy	3:58
6	"Deeez Nuuuts"	Young; Broadus; Arnaud; Wolfe; Nathaniel Hale	Intro: Warren G; Chorus: Snoop Doggy Dogg, Dr. Dre; First verse: Dr. Dre; Second verse: Daz Dillinger; Third verse: Dr. Dre; Outro: Nate Dogg	"Chestnuts" by Rudy Ray Moore; Excerpted from an episode, called "The Case of the Runaway Corpse", in which was taken from a show, Perry Mason.; "Pull Fancy Dancer/Pull" by One Way	5:06
7	"Lil' Ghetto Boy"	Young; Broadus; Curry	First verse: Snoop Doggy Dogg; Second verse: Dr. Dre; Third verse: Snoop Doggy Dogg; Backing vocals: Daz Dillinger, Nate Dogg	"Little Ghetto Boy" by Donny Hathaway; "I Get Lifted" by George McCrae; "The Get Out of the Ghetto Blues" by Gil Scott-Heron	5:27
8	"A Nigga Witta Gun"	Young; Broadus; Curry; Callie Cheek; Dennis White; Johnny Smith; Kevin Bell; Kevin Lassiter; Michael Cheek; Peter Duarte; Ray Wright; Ronald Bell; Wilson Beckett	Dr. Dre	"Big Sur Suite" by Johnny "Hammond" Smith; "Who's the Man (With the Master Plan)" by The Kay Gees; "Friends" by Whodini	3:52
9	"Rat-Tat-Tat-Tat"	Young; Broadus	Intro: RBX; Verses: Dr. Dre; Chorus: Snoop Doggy Dogg, BJ; Outro: Snoop Doggy Dogg	Contains an audio sample from The Mack; "Vegetable Wagon" by Donny Hathaway; "Brothers Gonna Work It Out" by Willie Hutch; "Pot Belly" by Lou Donaldson	3:48
10	"The $20 Sack Pyramid (skit)"	Young; Broadus; Curry	Intro: Dr. Dre; Vocals: Snoop Doggy Dogg, Samara; Show host: Big Tittie Nickie; Contestant 1: The D.O.C.; Contestant 2: Samara	"Papa Was Too" by Joe Tex	2:53
11	"Lyrical Gangbang"	Young; Broadus; Curry; Arnaud; Collins; Yvette Allen; Donny Hathaway; Ricardo Brown	First verse: The Lady of Rage; Second verse: Kurupt; Third verse: RBX	"Damn" by The Nite-Liters; "When the Levee Breaks" by Led Zeppelin; "Played Like a Piano" by King Tee; "Hole in the Head" by Cypress Hill	4:04
12	"High Powered"	Young; Wolfe; Collins	Intro: Dr. Dre; Backing vocals: Lady of Rage; Verses: RBX; Outro: Daz Dillinger	"Buffalo Gals" by Malcolm McLaren	2:44
13	"The Doctor's Office (skit)"	Young; Allen; Jewell Peyton; Kevin Lewis	Jewell, The Lady of Rage, Dr. Dre	"Back in Bed" by Jewell	1:04
14	"Stranded on Death Row"	Young; Brown; Collins; Broadus; Allen; Isaac Hayes	Intro: Bushwick Bill; First verse: Kurupt; Second verse: RBX; Third verse: The Lady of Rage; Fourth verse: Snoop Doggy Dogg; Outro: Bushwick Bill	"Do Your Thing (Live)" by Isaac Hayes; "If It Don't Turn You on (You Outta Leave It Alone)" by B.T. Express; "The Jam" by Graham Central Station	4:47
15	"The Roach (The Chronic Outro)"	Young; Arnaud; E. Collins; Allen; W. Collins; Worrell; Clinton	Verses: RBX; Chorus: Emmage, Ruben; Backing vocals: Daz Dillinger, The Lady of Rage, Jewell	"P. Funk (Wants to Get Funked Up)", "Colour Me Funky" by Parliament; "Impeach the President" (Drums) by The Honey Drippers	4:36
16	"Bitches Ain't Shit"	Young; Broadus; Wolfe; Arnaud; Brown; Curry	Chorus: Snoop Doggy Dogg; First verse: Dr. Dre; Second verse: Daz Dillinger; Third verse: Kurupt; Fourth verse: Snoop Doggy Dogg; Outro: Jewell	"Adolescent Funk" by Funkadelic; "Let's Get Small" by Trouble Funk	4:48

The Chronic: Dualdisc Limited Edition DVD Side
No.	Title	Length
1.	"The Chronic" (In Enhanced Stereo)	62:04
2.	"Nuthin' But A 'G' Thang" (Original Music Video)	4:47
3.	"Let Me Ride" (Original Music Video)	6:54
4.	"Dre Day" (Original Music Video)	6:15
5.	"Lil' Ghetto Boy" (Original Music Video)	5:04

The Chronic: Remastered Edition Bonus Material
No.	Title	Length
17.	"Dre Day" (Original Music Video)	6:15

The Chronic: Re-Lit & From The Vault Bonus DVD
No.	Title	Length
1.	"Dre Day" (Original Music Video)	6:15
2.	"Dre Day" (Censored Music Video)	6:14
3.	"Let Me Ride" (Original Music Video)	6:54
4.	"Let Me Ride" (TV Version Music Video)	4:24
5.	"Nuthin' But A 'G' Thang" (Original Music Video)	4:47
6.	"Nuthin' But A 'G' Thang" (Unrated Music Video)	4:48
7.	"Lil' Ghetto Boy" (Original Music Video)	5:04
8.	"Dr. Dre Interview"	30:22
9.	"The Robbery" (Featurette)	6:34
10.	"'The Chronic' Promo #1"	0:36
11.	"'The Chronic' Promo #2"	0:36
12.	"'The Chronic' Promo #3"	0:36
13.	"'The Chronic' Promo #4"	0:36
14.	"'The Chronic' Promo #5"	0:36
15.	"'The Chronic' Commercial #1"	0:36
16.	"'The Chronic' Commercial #2"	0:36
17.	"'The Chronic' Commercial #3"	0:36
18.	"'The Chronic' Commercial #4"	0:36
19.	"Dr. Dre in Saigon, CA" (Featurette)	4:24
20.	"Poor Young Dave" (Audio) (performed by Snoop Doggy Dogg)	2:54
21.	"Slippin' In The West" (Audio) (performed by CPO and Kurupt)	5:06
22.	"Smoke Enough Bud" (Audio) (performed by Jewell and Snoop Doggy Dogg)	5:26
23.	"Foo Nay Mic" (Audio) (performed by CPO)	4:24
24.	"Dogg Collar" (Audio) (performed by Snoop Doggy Dogg, Lady V, KV, Big Pimpin', 6'9°, Twin and Badass)	5:04
25.	"Touchdown" (Audio) (performed by Snoop Doggy Dogg and Threat)	4:26
26.	"Would You Ride" (Audio) (performed by Kurupt, Amber, Tyrone, Daz and Snoop Doggy Dogg)	6:29

== Credits and personnel ==
- Dr. Dre – vocals, synthesizers, producer, drum programming, mixing, programming, video director, writer
- Snoop Doggy Dogg – vocals, co-writer
- RBX – vocals, composer, co-writer
- Lady of Rage – vocals
- Warren G – vocals, drum programming, composer
- The D.O.C. – co-writer, vocals
- Nate Dogg – vocals, composer
- Dat Nigga Daz – vocals, drum programming, composer Producing on tracks (7,9,12)
- Kurupt – vocals, composer
- Jewell – vocals
- Colin Wolfe – bass guitar, bass keyboard, co-writer, keyboards, strings, rhodes piano
- Justin Reinhardt – keyboards
- Katisse Buckingham – flute, saxophone
- Eric "The Drunk" Borders – guitar
- Chris Clairmont – guitar
- Bernie Grundman – mastering
- Greg "Gregski" Royal – mixing
- Chris "The Glove" Taylor – mixing, drum programming
- Willie Will – assistant mixing engineer
- Ben Butler – producer
- Suge Knight – executive producer
- Kimberly Brown – project coordinator
- Kimberly Holt–Unleashed – art direction, graphic design
- Daniel Jordan – photography
- Rudy Ray Moore – vocal samples
- Cheron Moore – drums
- Ain't Nothin' Goin' On but Funkin', BMG, Bridgeport Music, Chariiz Music, Jim-Edd Music, Kobalt Music, Kuumba Music, Notting Hill Music, Nuthouse Music, RBX Music, Rondor Music, Sony Music Entertainment, Southfield Music, Suge Publishing, Warner/Chappell, Warner Music Group – publishers
- Atlantic Records, Death Row Records, Priority Records – distributors
- Interscope Records, Death Row Records, Priority Records – label
- Suge Knight – executive producer
- Death Row Records, Interscope Records, Warner Music Group – phonographic copyright ℗
- Death Row Records, Interscope Records, Warner Music Group – copyright ©

== Charts ==
=== Weekly charts ===
Chart (1993–2004)	Peak position
Australian Albums (ARIA)	91
German Albums (Offizielle Top 100)	74
Irish Albums (IRMA)	48
Swedish Albums (Sverigetopplistan)	35
UK Albums (Official Charts)	43
UK R&B Albums (Official Charts)	11
US Billboard 200	3
US Top R&B/Hip-Hop Albums (Billboard)	1

2022 chart performance for The Chronic
Chart (2022)	Peak position
Polish Albums (ZPAV)	48

2023 chart performance for The Chronic
Chart (2023)	Peak position
Belgian Albums (Ultratop Flanders)	139
Belgian Albums (Ultratop Wallonia)	96
German Albums (Offizielle Top 100)	35
Swiss Albums (Schweizer Hitparade)	32

=== Year-end charts ===
Chart (1993)	Position
US Billboard 200	6
US Top R&B/Hip Hop Albums (Billboard)	2

Chart (1994)	Position
US Top R&B/Hip Hop Albums (Billboard)	57

Chart (2001)	Position
Belgian Albums (Ultratop Wallonia)	73
Canadian R&B Albums (Nielsen SoundScan)	194

== Certifications ==
Region	Certification	Certified units/sales
Canada (Music Canada)	Platinum	100,000^{‡}
United Kingdom (BPI)	Platinum	300,000^{‡}
United States (RIAA)	3× Platinum	5,700,000
^{‡} Sales+streaming figures based on certification alone.

== See also ==
- List of Billboard number-one R&B albums of 1993
