= Nuthin' but a 'G' Thang =

Single by Dr. Dre featuring Snoop Doggy Dogg

from the album The Chronic
- Released: January 19, 1993
- Recorded: 1992
- Studio: Death Row (Los Angeles, California)
- Genre: West Coast hip-hop; G-funk; gangsta rap
- Length: 3:58
- Label: Death Row; Priority; Interscope
- Songwriters: Andre Young; Calvin Broadus; Tracy Curry; Frederick Knight; Otha Haywood
- Producer: Dr. Dre

Dr. Dre singles chronology
"Deep Cover" (1992)	"Nuthin' but a 'G' Thang" (1993)	"Fuck wit Dre Day (And Everybody's Celebratin')" (1993)

Snoop Doggy Dogg singles chronology
"Deep Cover" (1992)	"Nuthin' But a "G" Thang" (1993)	"Fuck wit Dre Day (And Everybody's Celebratin')" (1993)

Music video
- "Nuthin' but a 'G' Thang" on YouTube

"Nuthin' but a 'G' Thang" is a song by American rapper and producer Dr. Dre featuring fellow American rapper Snoop Dogg, on Dre's debut solo album, The Chronic (1992). Released in January 1993 by Death Row, Interscope and Priority as the album's first single, it reached number two on the US Billboard Hot 100 on March 20, 1993, behind "Informer" by Snow. It outperformed The Chronic's other singles, "Fuck wit Dre Day (And Everybody's Celebratin')", which peaked at number eight, and "Let Me Ride", which peaked at number 34. The single also reached number-one on Billboard's Hot R&B/Hip-Hop Singles & Tracks chart, and was a number 31 hit in the UK. Its music video was directed by Dr. Dre himself.

The song was selected by the Rock and Roll Hall of Fame as one of their "500 Songs That Shaped Rock and Roll". XXL magazine named it the top hip-hop song of the decade. The song samples "I Want'a Do Something Freaky to You" by Leon Haywood. In June 1994, it was reissued in certain European countries.

== Background ==
Dr. Dre has stated that Warren G initially brought in a cassette tape with demo tracks recorded by Snoop Dogg for Dre to listen to. Upon putting the tape in, Dre was impressed enough to the point where he felt the two of them had to meet.

After meeting Snoop Dogg, Dr. Dre asked him to come up with lyrics for a beat he'd been working on, which he planned to use as a featured track for The Chronic. Around this time, Snoop was serving jail time for a charge of attempted murder and recorded the original version of the song's vocals while making a pre-paid call from a prison phone. Dr Dre stated that “The original version of Nuthin but a 'G' Thang, he called in and I take the receiver of the phone to the mic. You can hear jail sounds in the back and everything, he's “1, 2, 3 and to the 4…””.

== Critical reception ==
Peter Paphides from Melody Maker commented, "The thing that makes Dr Dre's music so ace (in the case of "Nuthin' but a G Thang") is the fluidity of the rhymes and a salubrious touch of swingbeat arrangements that sweeten the blow of the lithe, luminous rhythm section. The subject matter — a slimy soliloquy on how Dre and guest rapper Snoop Doggy Dogg like their woman — is best taken with a pinch of salt." Pan-European magazine Music & Media wrote, "Diagnosing this case—assisted by his protege Snoop Doggy Dogg—the doctor has made a very radio friendly slow rap song. Our prescription; to be taken daily 10 times." Mark Sutherland from UK magazine Smash Hits gave it two out of five, saying, "Dr Dre, on the other hand, really is hard. You can tell by the way he swears, refers to girlies as "bitches" and gets real-life toughguy Snoop Doggy Dogg to rap over his slow 'n' sleazy hip-hop. All of which helped it sell two million copies in the States, but still doesn't make it a good record. In fact, it ain't nuthin' but a load of old rubbish, but don't tell the Doc I said so."

== Music video ==
The accompanying music video for "Nuthin' but a 'G' Thang", directed by Dr. Dre, depicts Dre coming into Long Beach, California to pick up Snoop and go to a block party. Mingling at the party, they perform the first verses with a barbecue cookout and a game of volleyball nearby. A female player's (Mercedes Ashley) bikini top is pulled down by "T-Dubb", an original member of the Long Beach rap group Foesum, exposing her breasts. For the next verses they go inside the house. A small sequence of events shows a snobbish female party-goer humiliated by being sprayed with shaken-up malt liquor. The video ends with Dre dropping Snoop off back at his house, with Snoop staggering up the driveway. The MTV edit censors nudity, drug paraphernalia, Warren G with a blunt, copyrighted logos, a Chicago White Sox ball cap, and screen text. Many artists appeared in video, including The D.O.C., Warren G, Daz Dillinger, Kurupt, RBX and Suga Free.

== In popular culture ==
- The song was featured on Radio Los Santos, a fictional hip-hop radio station in the 2004 video game Grand Theft Auto: San Andreas. This is an anachronism as the game is set in 1992.
- In the 2015 biopic Straight Outta Compton, the song is shown being improvised by Snoop Dogg (Lakeith Stanfield) and Dr. Dre (Corey Hawkins).

== Accolades ==
"Nuthin' but a 'G' Thang" is listed in The Rock and Roll Hall of Fame's 500 Songs that Shaped Rock and Roll. In 2003, it was ranked at number 427 on the Rolling Stone's list of the "500 Greatest Songs of All Time", moving up to number 29 in a 2024 update. Q magazine listed it as the 24th greatest hip-hop song of all time. In September 2010 Pitchfork Media included it at number three on their "Top 200 Tracks of the 90s". In 2024, Forbes magazine ranked "Nuthin' but a 'G' Thang" number 50 in their list of "The 50 Best Songs of the 1990s".

== Criticism ==
Musically, the funk orientation in hip-hop is often linked to "Nuthin' but a 'G' Thang" but its roots were laid by another rap group, Above the Law. "Nuthin' But a G Thang echoes Above the Law's Never Missin' a Beat" [sic], according to a 2016 article in The Guardian. Both groups interpolated the signature funk grooves of Parliament-Funkadelic.

== Live performances ==
Dre and Snoop performed the song live at the 1993 MTV Movie Awards on June 13, 1993. They also performed the song live at the 1994 Soul Train Music Awards on March 15, 1994.

== Track listing ==
- 1992 CD single
1. "Nuthin' But a "G" Thang" (Radio Mix) – 3:56
2. "Nuthin' But a "G" Thang" (LP Version) – 3:58
3. "Nuthin' But a "G" Thang" (Instrumental) – 4:06
4. "Nuthin' But a "G" Thang" (Club Mix) – 4:38
5. "Nuthin' But a "G" Thang" (Vibe Instrumental) – 4:30
6. "Nuthin' But a "G" Thang" (Freestyle Remix) – 4:11
- 1994 CD single
1. "Nuthin' But a "G" Thang" (Radio Mix) – 3:56
2. "Let Me Ride" (Radio Mix) – 4:22
3. "Nuthin' But a "G" Thang" (Club Mix) – 4:38
4. "Let Me Ride" (Extended Club Mix) – 11:01
- 1992 12" vinyl
1. "Nuthin' But a "G" Thang" (Radio Mix) – 3:56
2. "Nuthin' But a "G" Thang" (LP Version) – 3:58
3. "Nuthin' But a "G" Thang" (Instrumental) – 4:06
4. "A Nigga Witta Gun" – 3:56
5. "Nuthin' But a "G" Thang" (Club Mix) – 4:38
6. "Nuthin' But a "G" Thang" (Freestyle Remix) – 4:11
- 1994 UK 12" vinyl
1. "Let Me Ride" (Radio Mix) – 4:22
2. "Let Me Ride" (Extended Club Mix) – 11:01
3. "Nuthin' But a "G" Thang" (Freestyle Remix) – 4:11
- 1994 US 12" vinyl
1. "Nuthin' But a "G" Thang" (Radio Mix) – 3:56
2. "Nuthin' But a "G" Thang" (Red Eye Mix) – 4:25
3. "Nuthin' But a "G" Thang" (Club Mix) – 4:38
4. "Let Me Ride" (Radio Mix) – 4:22

== Charts ==
=== Weekly charts ===
Chart (1993)	Peak position
Australia (ARIA)	63
Europe (European Dance Radio)	14
New Zealand (Recorded Music NZ)	39
UK Singles (Official Charts)	31
UK Dance (Music Week)	5
UK Club Chart (Music Week)	69
US Billboard Hot 100	2
US Dance Club Songs (Billboard)	22
US Dance Singles Sales (Billboard)	3
US Hot R&B/Hip-Hop Songs (Billboard)	1
US Hot Rap Songs (Billboard)	1
US Rhythmic Airplay (Billboard)	2
US Cash Box Top 100	2

Chart (2022)	Peak position
Global 200 (Billboard)	150

=== Year-end charts ===
Chart (1993)	Position
US Billboard Hot 100	11
US Hot R&B/Hip-Hop Songs (Billboard)	11

=== Decade-end charts ===
Chart (1990–99)	Position
US Billboard Hot 100	95

== Certifications ==
Region	Certification	Certified units/sales
New Zealand (RMNZ)	3× Platinum	90,000^{‡}
United Kingdom (BPI)	Platinum	600,000^{‡}
United States (RIAA)	Platinum	1,300,000
^{‡} Sales+streaming figures based on certification alone.

== See also ==
- List of number-one R&B singles of 1993 (U.S.)
