= Deuce (The D.O.C. album) =

2003 album by The D.O.C.

Studio album by the D.O.C.
- Released: February 25, 2003
- Recorded: 2002–2003
- Genre: G-funk, gangsta rap
- Length: 61:12
- Label: Silverback

The D.O.C. chronology
Helter Skelter (1996)	Deuce (2003)

Singles from Deuce
- 1. "The Shit" Released: 2003

Professional ratings
Review scores
Source	Rating
AllMusic	2.5/5 stars
RapReviews	7.5/10
The Rolling Stone Album Guide	3/5 stars
Vibe	3.5/5 stars

Deuce is the third studio album by Dallas rapper the D.O.C., and the second since the car accident which severely damaged his larynx. Originally planned for release through Aftermath Entertainment, after disagreements with Dr Dre and a year-long delay, it was released on February 25, 2003, through the D.O.C.'s own label Silverback Records. The only single released from Deuce was "The Shit", which features former-N.W.A. members MC Ren and Ice Cube, along with Snoop Dogg and 6Two. Deuce peaked at number 184 on Billboard 200 chart.

== Production ==
The album was originally meant to be a 6Two album, completely produced by Dr. Dre and released through Aftermath Entertainment. However, D.O.C. and Dre argued over whether D.O.C. should be rapping on the album. The D.O.C.'s presence on this album is minimal however, making an appearance to introduce tracks or perform in skits such as "My Prayer" and "Souliloquy". Deuce focuses primarily on showcasing other artists on D.O.C.'s Silverback Records label, including U.P.-T.I.G.H.T., El Dorado, and in particular, 6Two.

The song "Simple as That" was released earlier in 2001 on DJ Greg Street's Six O'Clock Vol. 1 mixtape.

== Track listing ==
No.	Title	Producer(s)	Length
1.	"Music Business"		0:22
2.	"My Prayer"	The D.O.C.	0:56
3.	"Big Dick Shit (Concrete Jungle)" (featuring 6Two, Nate Dogg and U.P.-T.I.G.H.T.)	The D.O.C., Jazze Pha	3:58
4.	"A Lil' Dick Shit" (featuring Dick Griffey)		0:21
5.	"The Shit" (featuring 6Two, Ice Cube, MC Ren and Snoop Dogg)	The D.O.C., Jazze Pha	4:58
6.	"What Would You Do?" (featuring 6Two and U.P.-T.I.G.H.T.)	The D.O.C., Jazze Pha	4:56
7.	"Psychic Pymp Hotline"	Dr. Dre	0:47
8.	"Gorilla Pympin'" (featuring 6Two & Dr. Dre)	The D.O.C., Erotic	5:01
9.	"Judgement Day" (featuring 6Two & Dr. Dre)	The D.O.C., Dr. Dre	3:57
10.	"Souliloquy"	The D.O.C.	1:27
11.	"Ghetto Blues" (featuring 6Two)	The D.O.C., Erotic	4:33
12.	"All in the Family" (featuring El Dorado and N'Dambi)	The D.O.C., Erotic	4:45
13.	"1-2-3 (Critical Condition)" (featuring U.P.-T.I.G.H.T.)	The D.O.C., Jabourn	3:27
14.	"Touch of Blues"	The D.O.C.	0:21
15.	"Mentally Disturbed" (featuring 6Two)	The D.O.C., Dr. Dre	4:49
16.	"Safari West" (featuring Greg Street, Lil' Rob and MC Breed)	The D.O.C.	0:52
17.	"DFW" (featuring 6Two, Baby, El Dorado and U.P.-T.I.G.H.T.)	The D.O.C., Organized Noize	4:51
18.	"Simple as That" (featuring 6Two)	The D.O.C., Jazze Pha	4:43
19.	"Playboy" (featuring 6Two, Erotic and Cadillac Seville)	The D.O.C., Erotic	5:02
20.	"Snoop Shit" (featuring Snoop Dogg)		1:08

== Singles ==
=== "The Shit" ===
"The Shit"

Single by the D.O.C.

from the album Deuce
- Released: 2003
- Recorded: 2002
- Studio: Encore, Burbank, California
- Genre: West coast hip hop
- Length: 4:58
- Label: Silverback
- Songwriter(s): T. Curry; L. Patterson; O. Jackson; C. Broadus; C. Longmiles
- Producer(s): The D.O.C.; Jazze Pha

The D.O.C. singles chronology
"4 My Doggz" (1996)	"The Shit" (2003)

"The Shit" (censored as "The ?hit") is the only single from the album. A posse cut, the song features former-N.W.A. members MC Ren and Ice Cube along with Snoop Dogg and 6Two. "The Shit" was released in 2003 on CD and 12-inch vinyl formats but did not appear on any music chart. The 12-inch promotional release includes the track "Big Dick Shit (Concrete Jungle)" as a B-side; produced by Jazze Pha, the song features Nate Dogg, U.P.-T.I.G.H.T., and 6Two. "The Shit" contains samples of "P. Funk (Wants to Get Funked Up)" by Parliament and "Still Talkin'" by Eazy-E.

==== US vinyl track listing ====
A side

1. The Shit (Street) - 4:59
2. The Shit (Clean) - 4:01

B side

1. The Shit (Instrumental) - 5:08
2. The Shit (A Cappella) - 4:58

==== US promotional vinyl track listing ====
A side

1. The Shit (Clean) - 4:01
2. The Shit (Street) - 4:59
3. The Shit (Instrumental) - 5:08
4. The Shit (A Cappella) - 4:58

B side

1. Big Dick Shit (Clean) - 4:07
2. Big Dick Shit (Street) - 4:06
3. Big Dick Shit (Instrumental) - 3:57
4. Big Dick Shit (A Cappella)
