= It's Funky Enough =

Single by The D.O.C.

from the album No One Can Do It Better
- Released: June 16, 1989
- Recorded: 1989
- Genre: G-funk
- Length: 4:27
- Label: Ruthless; Atlantic
- Songwriter(s): Tracy Curry
- Producer(s): Dr. Dre

The D.O.C. singles chronology
"It's Funky Enough" (1989)	"The D.O.C. & The Doctor" (1989)

Music video
- "It's Funky Enough" on YouTube

"It's Funky Enough" is the debut single by American rapper The D.O.C., featured as the first track on his 1989 debut album No One Can Do It Better. It spent 18 weeks on the US Top Rap Songs chart, including four at number one. A video shot in black and white was made to promote the song.

== Background ==
The song was produced by Dr. Dre. It samples "Misdemeanor" by Foster Sylvers. The song has appeared on many video games such as Grand Theft Auto: San Andreas, True Crime: Streets of LA, and Madden NFL 2005. Its line "Y'all ready for this?" has been sampled on many rap tracks.

== Samples and covers ==
Most notably, "Y'all ready for this?" has been made globally famous as a sample in the song "Get Ready for This" by the early 1990s dance group 2 Unlimited. That song is arguably the most played opening song for arena-based sporting events.

The quote "stop him in his tracks, show him that I am Ruthless" was sampled by Eazy-E for the chorus of his diss song against Dr. Dre, "Real Muthaphuckkin G's" in 1993.

"It's Funky Enough" was sampled again by Eazy-E in his song "Creep n Crawl", which appears on his 1995 posthumous album Str8 off tha Streetz of Muthaphukkin Compton. as well as "That's Gangsta" by Shyne off his 2000 self titled debut album.

The line "when I am flowing" is sampled by Seattle rapper Kid Sensation in the song "Flowin'", which appears on the 1990 album Rollin' With Number One.

== Track listing ==
US 12" vinyl single

A-side

1. "It's Funky Enough" (LP version) – 4:29
2. "It's Funky Enough" (instrumental) – 4:22
3. "It's Funky Enough" (a cappella) – 0:44

B-side

1. "No One Can Do It Better" (LP version) – 4:50
2. "No One Can Do It Better" (instrumental) – 4:50
3. "No One Can Do It Better" (a cappella) – 1:12

== Charts ==
Chart (1989)	Peak position
US Hot R&B Singles (Billboard)	12
US Hot Rap Singles (Billboard)	1
US Dance/Electronic Singles (Billboard)	24
