= Billboard Year-End Hot Soul Singles of 1977 =

American music chart

This is a list of Billboard magazine's Top Hot Soul Singles of 1977.

No.	Title	Artist(s)
1	"Float On"	The Floaters
2	"I've Got Love on My Mind"	Natalie Cole
3	"Got to Give It Up"	Marvin Gaye
4	"I Wish"	Stevie Wonder
5	"Best of My Love"	The Emotions
6	"Dazz"	Brick
7	"Tryin' to Love Two"	William Bell
8	"It's Ecstasy When You Lay Down Next to Me"	Barry White
9	"Strawberry Letter 23"	The Brothers Johnson
10	"Slide"	Slave
11	"Good Thing Man"	Frank Lucas
12	"Don't Leave Me This Way"	Thelma Houston
13	"Car Wash"	Rose Royce
14	"Easy"	Commodores
15	"Sunshine"	Enchantment
16	"Free"	Deniece Williams
17	"Ain't Gonna Bump No More (With No Big Fat Woman)"	Joe Tex
18	"Gloria"	Enchantment
19	"I Believe You"	Dorothy Moore
20	"Sometimes"	Facts of Life
21	"Enjoy Yourself"	The Jacksons
22	"Darlin' Darlin' Baby (Sweet, Tender, Love)"	The O'Jays
23	"The Pride"	The Isley Brothers
24	"Whodunit"	Tavares
25	"At Midnight (My Love Will Lift You Up)"	Rufus featuring Chaka Khan
26	"Hot Line"	The Sylvers
27	"It Feels So Good to be Loved So Bad"	The Manhattans
28	"Devil's Gun"	C. J. & Company
29	"Sir Duke"	Stevie Wonder
30	"Be My Girl"	The Dramatics
31	"Do It to My Mind"	Johnny Bristol
32	"I'm Your Boogie Man"	KC and the Sunshine Band
33	"The Greatest Love of All"	George Benson
34	"Let's Clean Up the Ghetto"	Philadelphia International All Stars
35	"Boogie Nights"	Heatwave
36	"I Don't Love You Anymore"	Teddy Pendergrass
37	"L.A. Sunshine"	War
38	"O-H-I-O"	Ohio Players
39	"I Kinda Miss You"	The Manhattans
40	"Keep It Comin' Love"	KC and the Sunshine Band
41	"Somethin' 'Bout 'Cha"	Latimore
42	"See You When I Git There"	Lou Rawls
43	"Open Sesame"	Kool & the Gang
44	"There Will Come a Day (I'm Gonna Happen to You)"	Smokey Robinson
45	"You Don't Have to Be a Star (To Be in My Show)"	Marilyn McCoo and Billy Davis Jr.
46	"I Don't Wanna Lose Your Love"	The Emotions
47	"Saturday Nite"	Earth, Wind & Fire
48	"Bodyheat"	James Brown
49	"Break It to Me Gently"	Aretha Franklin
50	"A Real Mother for Ya"	Johnny "Guitar" Watson

== See also ==
- 1977 in music
- Billboard Year-End Hot 100 singles of 1977
- List of Hot Soul Singles number ones of 1977
