= Straight Outta Compton: Music from the Motion Picture =

Straight Outta Compton: Music From the Motion Picture

Soundtrack album by various artists
- Released: January 8, 2016
- Genre: West Coast hip hop; gangsta rap; funk; G-funk
- Length: 77:55
- Label: Universal
- Producer: Dr. Dre; DJ Yella; George Clinton; Ice Cube; Roy Ayers; Sir Jinx; Steve Arrington; The Bomb Squad

Straight Outta Compton: Music from the Motion Picture is the soundtrack to the 2015 film of the same name. The album was released by Universal Music Enterprises on January 8, 2016 in digital formats. The soundtrack features songs that were mainly performed by N.W.A but also includes solo performances from N.W.A members Ice Cube, Eazy-E, and Dr. Dre (featuring Snoop Dogg).

== Commercial performance ==
The soundtrack debuted at number 39 on the US Billboard 200, for the week ending January 30, 2016. The album debuted at number-one on the Top Rap Albums chart. In the second week, the album peaked at number one on the Billboard's Top R&B/Hip-Hop Albums, selling 12,000 units in the second chart week.

== Track listing ==
Writing credits adapted from the album's liner notes and those of the albums Eazy-Duz-It and Straight Outta Compton and the EP 100 Miles and Runnin' all of which feature tracks that appear on this album.

No.	Title	Writer(s)	Artist	Length
1.	"Straight Outta Compton" (from Straight Outta Compton, 1988)	Ice Cube, MC Ren, The D.O.C	N.W.A	4:17
2.	"Flash Light" (from Funkentelechy Vs. the Placebo Syndrome, 1978)	George Clinton, Bootsy Collins, Bernie Worrell	Parliament	4:28
3.	"We Want Eazy" (from Eazy-Duz-It, 1988)	The D.O.C	Eazy-E featuring Dr. Dre and MC Ren	5:00
4.	"Gangsta Gangsta" (from Straight Outta Compton, 1988)	Ice Cube	N.W.A	5:35
5.	"(Not Just) Knee Deep" (from Uncle Jam Wants You, 1979)	Clinton, Philippé Wynne	Funkadelic	4:29
6.	"Boyz-n-the-Hood" (from N.W.A. and the Posse, 1987)	Ice Cube	Eazy E	5:37
7.	"Everybody Loves the Sunshine" (from Everybody Loves the Sunshine, 1976)	Roy Ayers	Roy Ayers Ubiquity	4:00
8.	"Dopeman (Remix)" (from Straight Outta Compton, 1988)	Ice Cube	N.W.A	5:19
9.	"Fuck tha Police" (from Straight Outta Compton, 1988)	Ice Cube, MC Ren, The D.O.C	N.W.A	5:15
10.	"Express Yourself" (from Straight Outta Compton, 1988)	Ice Cube	N.W.A	4:23
11.	"Weak at the Knees" (from Steve Arrington's Hall of Fame, Vol.1, 1983)	Steve Arrington, Charles Carter, Wayne "Buddy" Hankerson, Roger Parker	Steve Arrington's Hall of Fame	3:48
12.	"Quiet on tha Set" (from Straight Outta Compton, 1988)	MC Ren	N.W.A	3:57
13.	"8 Ball (Remix)" (from Straight Outta Compton, 1988)	Ice Cube	N.W.A	4:50
14.	"The Nigga Ya Love to Hate" (from AmeriKKKa's Most Wanted, 1990)	Ice Cube, Eric Sadler	Ice Cube	3:13
15.	"Real Niggaz" (from 100 Miles and Runnin', 1990)	MC Ren, The D.O.C	N.W.A	4:27
16.	"No Vaseline" (from Death Certificate, 1991)	Ice Cube	Ice Cube	5:12
17.	"Nuthin' but a 'G' Thang" (from The Chronic, 1992)	Snoop Dogg, Dr. Dre	Dr. Dre featuring Snoop Dogg	3:58

=== Sample credits ===
- "We Want Eazy" samples "Ahh...the Name is Bootsy, Baby" by Bootsy's Rubber Band (written by George Clinton, Bootsy Collins, and Maceo Parker).
- "Gangsta Gangsta" samples "Funky Worm" by the Ohio Players (written by Leroy "Sugarfoot" Bonner, Marshall Jones, Ralph Middlebrooks, Norman "Bruce" Napier, Walter Morrison, Andrew Noland, Marvin Pierce, and Greg Webster), "Weak at the Knees" by Steve Arrington' Hall of Fame (written by Arrington, Charles Carter, Wayne "Buddy" Hankerson, and Roger Parker), and "Be Thankful for What You Got" by William DeVaughn (written by DeVaughn).
- "Fuck tha Police" samples "The Boogie Back" by Roy Ayers Ubiquity (written by Harry Whitaker).
- "Express Yourself" samples "Express Yourself" by Charles Wright & the Watts 103rd Street Rhythm Band (written by Wright).
- "The Nigga Ya Love to Hate" samples "Atomic Dog" by George Clinton (written by Clinton, Garry Shider, and David Spradley).
- "No Vaseline" samples "Dazz" by Brick (written by Regi Hargis, Eddie Irons, and Ray "Ransom" Raymond).
- "Nuthin' but a 'G' Thang" samples "I Want'a Do Something Freaky to You" by Leon Haywood (written by Haywood) and "Uphill (Peace of Mind)" by Kid Dynamite (written by Frederick Knight).

== Personnel ==
- Frank Collura – A&R [UMe A&R]
- Vartan – Art Direction
- Jake Voulgarides – Coordinator [Soundtrack Album Coordinator For Universal Pictures]
- Howard Kim – Design
- Dr. Dre – Executive-Producer [Executive Album Producer]
- F. Gary Gray – Executive-Producer [Executive Album Producer]
- Ice Cube – Executive-Producer [Executive Album Producer]
- Tomica Woods-Wright – Executive-Producer [Executive Album Producer]
- Mike Knobloch – Executive-Producer [Executive In Charge Of Music For Universal Pictures]
- Kyle Staggs – Management [Music Business Affairs For Universal Pictures]
- Philip M. Cohen – Management [Music Business Affairs For Universal Pictures]
- Tanya Perara – Management [Music Business Affairs For Universal Pictures]
- Kelly Martinez – Management [UMe Licensing Manager]
- Evren Göknar – Mastering Engineer
- George Yarboi – Product Manager [UMe Product Manager]
- Monique McGuffin Newman – Production Manager [UMe Production Manager]
- Sujata Murthy – Public Relations [UMe Publicity]
- Angela Leus – Music Supervision [Music Supervised For Universal Pictures]
- Rachel Levy – Music Supervision [Music Supervised For Universal Pictures]
- Jojo Villanueva – Music Supervision [Music Supervisor]

== Charts ==
=== Weekly charts ===
Chart (2016)	Peak position
Australian Albums (ARIA)	12
Belgian Albums (Ultratop Flanders)	153
German Albums (Offizielle Top 100)	92
Swiss Albums (Schweizer Hitparade)	29
UK Compilation Albums (OCC)	38
UK R&B Albums (OCC)	14
US Billboard 200	39
US Top R&B/Hip-Hop Albums (Billboard)	1
US Top Rap Albums (Billboard)	1
US Soundtrack Albums (Billboard)	1

=== Year-end charts ===
Chart (2016)	Position
US Top R&B/Hip-Hop Albums (Billboard)	26
US Soundtrack Albums (Billboard)	6

== See also ==
- List of Billboard number-one R&B/hip-hop albums of 2016
