= List of Hot Soul Singles number ones of 1977 =

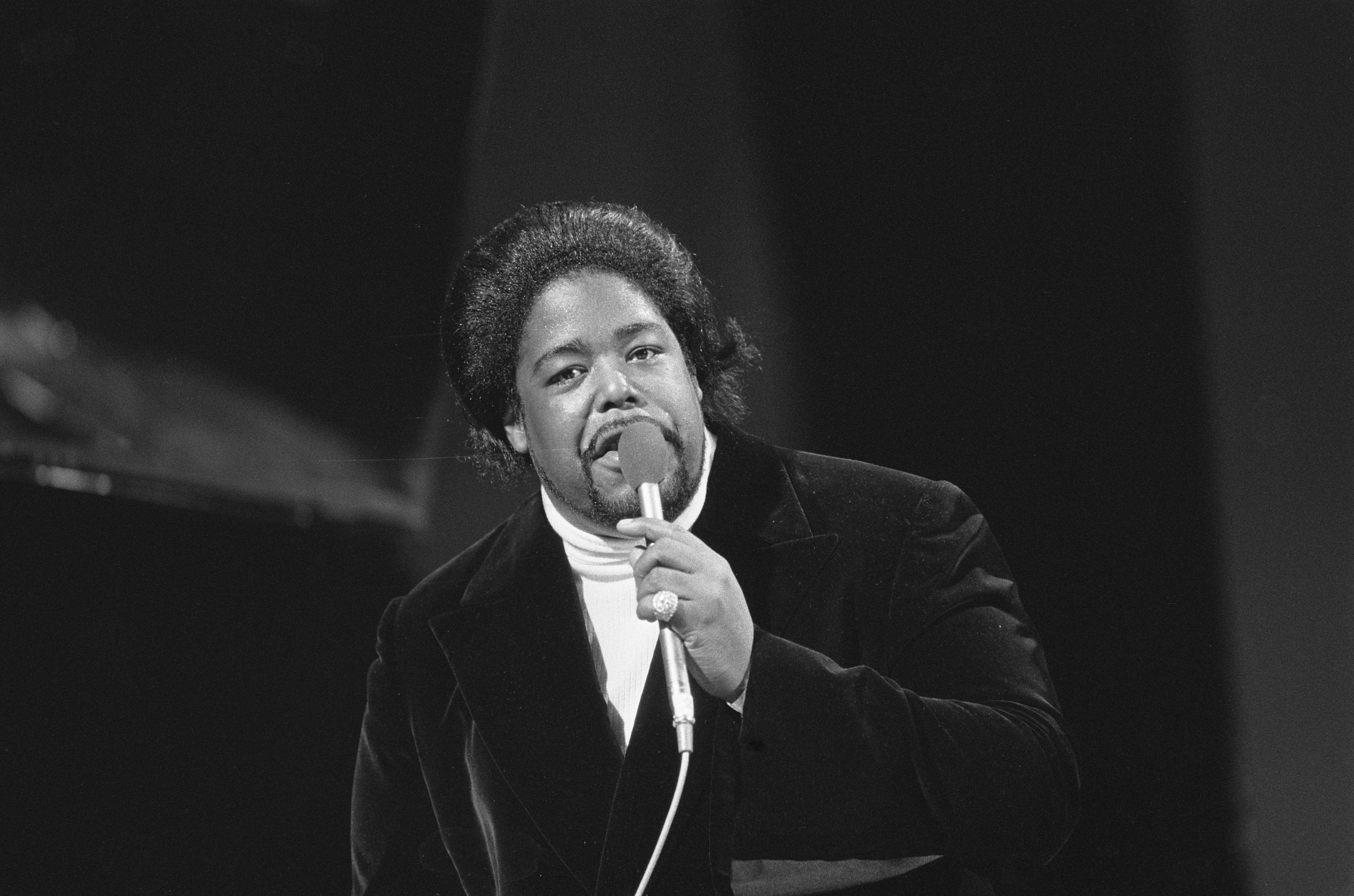
Barry White spent five weeks at number one with "It's Ecstasy When You Lay Down Next to Me".

Billboard published a weekly chart in 1977 ranking the top-performing singles in the United States in soul music and related African American-oriented genres; the chart has undergone various name changes over the decades to reflect the evolution of black music and since 2005 has been published as Hot R&B/Hip-Hop Songs. In 1977, it was published under the title Hot Soul Singles, and 21 different singles reached number one.

In the issue of Billboard dated January 1, the group Rose Royce was at number one with "Car Wash", the song's second week in the top spot. It was displaced the following week by "Darlin' Darlin' Baby (Sweet, Tender, Love)" by the O'Jays. The year's longest-running number one was "Serpentine Fire" by Earth, Wind & Fire, which reached the peak position in the issue of Billboard dated November 19 and stayed there for the remainder of the year, a total of seven consecutive weeks in the top spot. This also meant that the band had the highest total number of weeks at number one during the year, just ahead of two acts with six weeks in the top spot: the Floaters and Stevie Wonder. The latter was the only act to achieve more than one number one during 1977, spending five weeks in the top spot with "I Wish" and one with "Sir Duke".

The Floaters, whose single "Float On" was recognized by Billboard as the year's best-charting soul single, were among a number of acts that topped the soul singles chart in 1977 for the first time in their respective careers. Thelma Houston, the Emotions and Slave also reached the top spot for the first time during the year, as did William Bell, who had recorded his debut single in 1961 and first appeared on the chart in 1966 but had taken more than a decade to gain his first number one. None of the five acts who topped the chart for the first time during 1977 would go on to achieve any further number ones and the Floaters would not chart at all after 1978, despite "Float On" being a million-seller. Six of the year's soul number ones also topped the Hot 100 pop singles chart: both of Stevie Wonder's chart-toppers along with "Car Wash" by Rose Royce, "Don't Leave Me This Way" by Thelma Houston, "Got to Give It Up (Part 1)" by Marvin Gaye and "Best of My Love" by the Emotions. Other songs, however, did not achieve significant crossover success: "The Pride (Part 1)" by the Isley Brothers peaked at number 63 on the Hot 100.

== Chart history ==
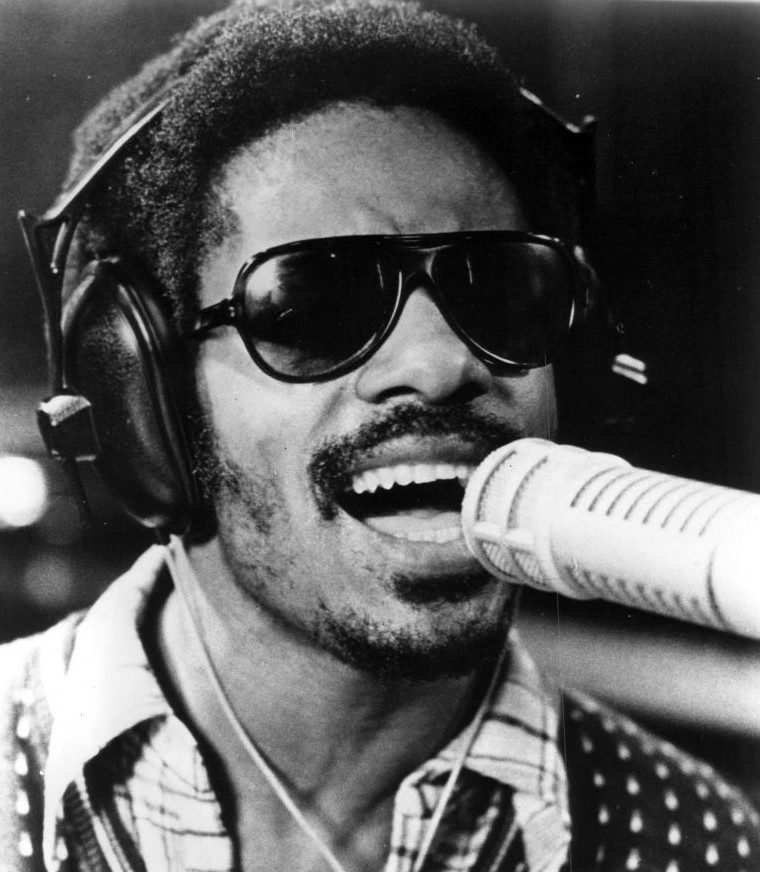
Stevie Wonder was the only act to achieve more than one number one in 1977.

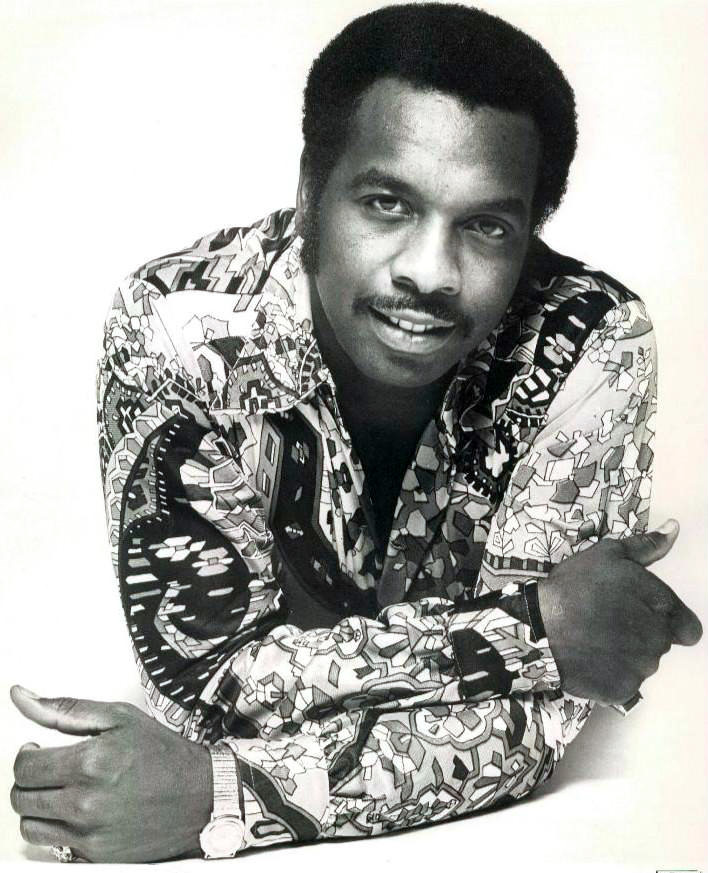
"Tryin' to Love Two" was a chart-topper for William Bell.

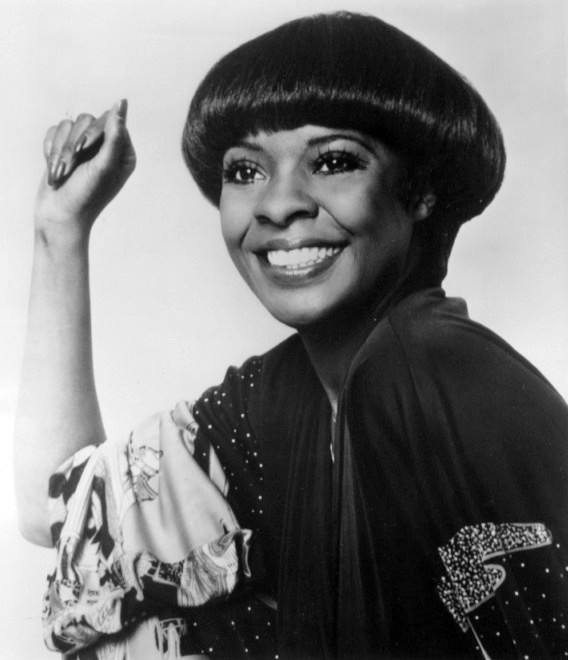
Thelma Houston reached number one with her version of "Don't Leave Me This Way".

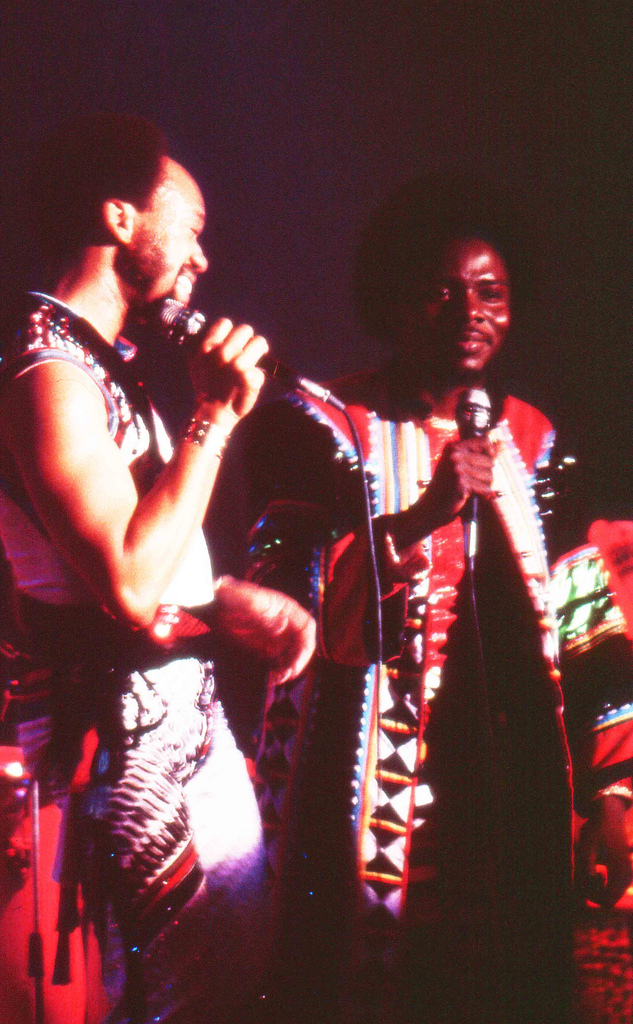
Earth, Wind & Fire spent the last seven weeks of 1977 atop the chart with "Serpentine Fire".

Key
†	Indicates number 1 on Billboard's year-end soul chart

Chart history
Issue date	Title	Artist(s)	Ref.
January 1	"Car Wash"	Rose Royce	
January 8	"Darlin' Darlin' Baby (Sweet, Tender, Love)"	The O'Jays	
January 15	"I Wish"	Stevie Wonder	
January 22	"I Wish"	Stevie Wonder	
January 29	"I Wish"	Stevie Wonder	
February 5	"I Wish"	Stevie Wonder	
February 12	"I Wish"	Stevie Wonder	
February 19	"Don't Leave Me This Way"	Thelma Houston	
February 26	"I've Got Love on My Mind"	Natalie Cole	
March 5	"I've Got Love on My Mind"	Natalie Cole	
March 12	"I've Got Love on My Mind"	Natalie Cole	
March 19	"I've Got Love on My Mind"	Natalie Cole	
March 26	"I've Got Love on My Mind"	Natalie Cole	
April 2	"Tryin' to Love Two"	William Bell	
April 9	"At Midnight (My Love Will Lift You Up)"	Rufus featuring Chaka Khan	
April 16	"At Midnight (My Love Will Lift You Up)"	Rufus featuring Chaka Khan	
April 23	"The Pride (Part 1)"	The Isley Brothers	
April 30	"Got to Give It Up (Part 1)"	Marvin Gaye	
May 7	"Got to Give It Up (Part 1)"	Marvin Gaye	
May 14	"Got to Give It Up (Part 1)"	Marvin Gaye	
May 21	"Whodunit"	Tavares	
May 28	"Sir Duke"	Stevie Wonder	
June 4	"Got to Give It Up (Part 1)"	Marvin Gaye	
June 11	"Got to Give It Up (Part 1)"	Marvin Gaye	
June 18	"Break It to Me Gently"	Aretha Franklin	
June 25	"Best of My Love"	The Emotions	
July 2	"Best of My Love"	The Emotions	
July 9	"Best of My Love"	The Emotions	
July 16	"Easy"	Commodores	
July 23	"Best of My Love"	The Emotions	
July 30	"Slide"	Slave	
August 6	"Strawberry Letter 23"	The Brothers Johnson	
August 13	"Float On" †	The Floaters	
August 20	"Float On" †	The Floaters	
August 27	"Float On" †	The Floaters	
September 3	"Float On" †	The Floaters	
September 10	"Float On" †	The Floaters	
September 17	"Float On" †	The Floaters	
September 24	"Keep It Comin' Love"	KC and the Sunshine Band	
October 1	"It's Ecstasy When You Lay Down Next to Me"	Barry White	
October 8	"It's Ecstasy When You Lay Down Next to Me"	Barry White	
October 15	"It's Ecstasy When You Lay Down Next to Me"	Barry White	
October 22	"It's Ecstasy When You Lay Down Next to Me"	Barry White	
October 29	"It's Ecstasy When You Lay Down Next to Me"	Barry White	
November 5	"(Every Time I Turn Around) Back in Love Again"	L.T.D.	
November 12	"(Every Time I Turn Around) Back in Love Again"	L.T.D.	
November 19	"Serpentine Fire"	Earth, Wind & Fire	
November 26	"Serpentine Fire"	Earth, Wind & Fire	
December 3	"Serpentine Fire"	Earth, Wind & Fire	
December 10	"Serpentine Fire"	Earth, Wind & Fire	
December 17	"Serpentine Fire"	Earth, Wind & Fire	
December 24	"Serpentine Fire"	Earth, Wind & Fire	
December 31	"Serpentine Fire"	Earth, Wind & Fire	

== See also ==
- Billboard Year-End Hot Soul Singles of 1977
- List of Billboard Hot 100 number-one singles of 1977
