= Just a Touch of Love =

Studio album by Slave
- Released: June 23, 1979
- Recorded: 1979 Atlantic & Power Station, New York City; House of Music, West Orange, New Jersey
- Genres: Soul, funk
- Length: 36:56
- Label: Cotillion
- Producers: Jimmy Douglass, Steve Washington

Slave chronology
The Concept (1978)	Just a Touch of Love (1979)	Stone Jam (1980)

Professional ratings
Review scores
Source	Rating
AllMusic	4.5/5 stars

Just a Touch of Love is the fourth album by the American funk band Slave, released in 1979. It was the band's second album with the vocals of Steve Arrington and Starleana Young. Vocalist Curt Jones joined the band at this time. The album reached number eleven on Billboard's Top Soul Albums chart in 1980. The title track was released as a single, reaching the top ten on the Soul Singles chart.

== Track listing ==
1. Just a Touch of Love - (Danny Webster, Mark Adams, Mark Hicks, Raye Turner, Starleana Young, Steve Arrington) (6:24)
2. Are You Ready for Love? - (Curt Jones, Danny Webster, Floyd Miller, Mark Adams, Mark Hicks, Raye Turner, Starleana Young, Steve Arrington) (5:58)
3. Funky Lady (Foxy Lady) - (James R. Wilson) (4:33)
4. Roots - (Curt Jones, Mark Adams, Starleana Young, Steve Arrington, Raye Turner) (5:00)
5. Painted Pictures - (Charles Carter, Raye Turner, Steve Washington) (0:26)
6. Thank You - (Floyd Miller, Kipper Jones, Mark Adams, Steve Arrington, Steve Washington) (5:35)
7. Shine - (Curt Jones, Danny Webster, Mark Adams, Mark Hicks, Starleana Young, Steve Arrington) (4:58)
8. Warning - (Mark Adams, Starleana Young, Steve Arrington, Steve Washington) (3:20)

== Charts ==
Chart (1980)	Peak position
Billboard Pop Albums	92
Billboard Top Soul Albums	11

=== Singles ===
Year	Single	Chart positions	
Year	Single	US R&B	US Dance
1979	"Just A Touch Of Love "	9	26
1980	"Funky Lady (Foxy Lady)"	55	—
