= Faze-O =

- Origin: Dayton, Ohio, U.S.
- Genres: R&B, funk
- Labels: She Records

Faze-O was a late 1970s funk group based in Dayton, Ohio and produced by Clarence Satchell of the Ohio Players, for whom it was the front band during many live performances. Their 1977 song "Riding High" has been sampled by hip hop artists.

== History ==
The roots of the band lie in the predecessor group, Faze 3, a trio that included bassist Tyrone "Flye" Crum. Additional members gradually joined or replaced earlier members, eventually augmenting the group to a five-piece band that evolved into Faze-O. In addition to bassist Crum, the original members of the group that officially took the name "Faze-O" were Ralph "Love" Aikens (guitar/vocals), Roger Parker (drums), Robert "Bip" Neal (lead vocals/percussion), and Keith Harrison (lead vocals/keyboards). This self-contained unit began writing songs as a group, with individual members contributing various elements, and honing arrangements that suited the feel/style of one member or another. By 1977, the band had completed recording their debut album, with contributions and production from members of the Ohio Players, releasing Riding High that year. This album's title track, featuring Harrison's tenor lead vocals complemented by Neal's bass vocal parts, became an immediate hit, reaching the top 10 on the R&B chart.

The group went on to release two subsequent albums- Good Thang and Breakin' the Funk in 1978 and 1979, respectively, with the title tracks for both albums being released as singles. However, further success proved elusive. By the dawn of the 1980s, the band had effectively dissolved, with several members moving on to other groups. Harrison joined the group Heatwave in the studio for their 1980 Candles album (becoming an official bandmember soon thereafter), before going on to a long stint with the Dazz Band, beginning with their 1983 On the One album. He continues as a current member of Dazz Band, as of 2024. Meanwhile, Parker became a member of Slave in time for their Show Time album before splintering from the group with Slave frontman/fellow drummer Steve Arrington for the latter's "Steve Arrington's Hall of Fame" project.

Since their dissolution, the band has reunited in various incarnations to perform. In 2011, the group performed in a line-up featuring original members Keith Harrison, Robert "Bip" Neal, and Ralph Aikens at Island Park in Dayton, Ohio.

All five original members reunited on December 17, 2015 at DATV Studios in Dayton to discuss their music and reminisce about their time as a band, as part of a series of interviews conducted by local deejay Stan "The Man" Brooks to commemorate the opening of Dayton's Funk Music Hall of Fame and Exhibition Center.

Original vocalist/percussionist Robert "Bip" Neal, Jr. died on April 13, 2021. Original drummer Roger Parker died on March 5, 2023.

== Band members ==
- Keith "Chop Chop" Harrison - Arp, Clavinet, Composer, Fender Rhodes, Keyboards, Mini Moog, Percussion, Piano, Piano (Electric), Lead and Backing Vocals
- Ralph "Love" Aikens, Jr. - Guitar, Talk Box, Lead and Backing Vocals
- Tyrone "Flye" Crum - Bass, Backing Vocals
- Robert "Bip" Neal, Jr. - Percussion, Lead and Backing Vocals
- Roger "Dodger" Parker - Drums, Percussion

== Discography ==
- 1977 Riding High
- 1978 Good Thang
- 1979 Breakin' the Funk
