= Straight Outta Compton =

1989 studio album by N.W.A

- Original 1989 cover

Studio album by N.W.A
- Released: January 25, 1989
- Recorded: Summer/Fall 1988
- Studios: Audio Achievements, Torrance, California
- Genres: West Coast hip-hop; gangsta rap
- Length: 60:16
- Labels: Ruthless; Priority
- Producers: Eazy-E (exec.); Dr. Dre; DJ Yella; Arabian Prince

N.W.A chronology
N.W.A. and the Posse (1987)	Straight Outta Compton (1989)	100 Miles and Runnin' (1990)

Singles from Straight Outta Compton
- 1. "Gangsta Gangsta" Released: November 1988; 2. "Express Yourself/Straight Outta Compton" Released: May 1989

Straight Outta Compton is the debut studio album by American hip-hop group N.W.A, released on January 25, 1989, through Priority and Ruthless Records. It was produced by N.W.A members Dr. Dre, DJ Yella, and Arabian Prince, with lyrics written by Eazy-E, Ice Cube and MC Ren, alongside contributions from Ruthless rapper and N.W.A affiliate the D.O.C. The album's lyrics depict the conditions of life in Compton, California, while also expressing hostility toward rival groups and law enforcement. The song "Fuck tha Police" prompted a warning letter from an FBI agent, which contributed to N.W.A's notoriety and the group's self-description as "the world's most dangerous group."

In July 1989, despite receiving limited radio airplay outside of the Los Angeles area, Straight Outta Compton became the first gangsta rap album to earn platinum certification, signifying over one million copies sold. The album reached number nine on Billboard's Top R&B/Hip-Hop Albums chart and number 37 on the Billboard 200 that same year. It attracted extensive media attention and is widely credited with accelerating the rise of hardcore gangsta rap in mainstream hip-hop. Although initial critical reception was mixed, the album has since been recognized as one of the most influential and acclaimed works in hip-hop history.

The album was reissued in September 2002 with four bonus tracks, and again in December 2007—shortly before its 20th anniversary—with several "tribute remixes" and a live recording of "Compton's n the House." In 2015, a red cassette reissue and the release of the biographical film Straight Outta Compton led to renewed commercial success, with the album later certified triple platinum. In 2016, it became the first rap album inducted into the Grammy Hall of Fame, and in 2017, it was added to the Library of Congress' National Recording Registry, for being "culturally, historically, or aesthetically significant".

== Background ==
During most of the 1980s, New York City—the birthplace of hip-hop—remained the genre's primary creative and commercial center, while Los Angeles County played a secondary role. Up until 1988, the Los Angeles hip-hop scene largely reflected hip-hop's dance-oriented and party-based origins, emphasizing DJs and DJ crews as its central figures. The dominant local style was electro rap or “funk hop,” influenced by tracks such as the New York-based 1982 hit "Planet Rock". In contrast, East Coast hip-hop had begun prioritizing lyricism following the commercial and cultural success of Run-DMC's self-titled 1984 album.

As the decade progressed, recording vocal performances over electro rap instrumentals became increasingly common. The World Class Wreckin' Cru, featuring Dr. Dre and DJ Yella, released one of the first West Coast rap albums issued by a major record label. Another prominent figure to emerge was Ice-T, whose 1986 single "6 in the Mornin'" drew inspiration from Philadelphia rapper Schoolly D's 1985 track "P.S.K. What Does It Mean?" Ice-T's song shifted attention in Los Angeles away from electro rap, achieved gold sales, and is widely considered an early example of "gangsta rap".

In 1987, Eric Wright, a Compton resident and member of the Kelly Park Crips, founded the independent label Ruthless Records. Through his prior activities, Wright had established connections with Dr. Dre and Arabian Prince, two Los Angeles producers with the latter specifically seeking greater financial control over his work. Wright enlisted South Central rapper Ice Cube—then a member of the group C.I.A.—as a ghostwriter and tasked him with writing material for the new label alongside Dr. Dre. The collaboration produced the track "Boyz-n-the-Hood". Originally intended for a New York group signed to Ruthless Records, the song was instead recorded by Wright himself under the name Eazy-E after the original performers declined it. Although the song was released solely under Eazy’s name, "Boyz-n-the-Hood" became a regional success, though some critics noted similarities to Schoolly D's "P.S.K." and found its tempo unsuitable for dancing. The success of the single lead Eazy to call for an EP titled N.W.A. The EP's five songs included Eazy and Cube on "Dopeman", Eazy on "8 Ball", and Arabian's production "Panic Zone.". The EP officially branded the group N.W.A.

Building on Ice-T's precedent, N.W.A developed a distinct approach to gangsta rap characterized by detailed depictions of street life, hostility toward authority, and references to violence. The group attempted to broaden its audience by providing radio edits to local stations such as KDAY, but received minimal radio play. Despite this, the album achieved significant commercial success, selling over one million copies and becoming the first gangsta rap album to earn platinum certification. As interest in the Los Angeles rap scene grew, artists such as MC Eiht of Compton's Most Wanted emerged in response, marking a broader regional shift from dance-oriented to hardcore rap styles.

Internationally, N.W.A became a leading representative of gangsta rap. The group's explicit and confrontational lyrics prompted opposition from law enforcement agencies and media outlets; the FBI issued a warning letter to Ruthless Records, MTV banned the "Straight Outta Compton" music video, several venues refused to host N.W.A concerts, and some police officers declined to provide security for their shows. These controversies reinforced N.W.A's anti-establishment image, which the members would later emphasize in subsequent recordings.

According to Slant Magazine, Straight Outta Compton played a pivotal role in shaping the East Coast–West Coast hip-hop rivalry, with the publication describing the album as "the West Coast firing on New York’s Fort Sumter in what would become '90s culture's biggest Uncivil War."

== Record production ==
Recording for Straight Outta Compton began not long after Eazy-E completed his first solo album Eazy-Duz-It. The album was recorded and produced at Audio Achievements Studio in Torrance, California, for $12,000, during the summer and fall of 1988. Dr. Dre, in a 1993 interview, recalls, "I threw that thing together in six weeks so we could have something to sell out of the trunk."

In an incident recalled in Jerry Heller's book, police approached the group while they were standing outside the studio in 1988 and demanded them to get on their knees and show ID without explanation. Outraged by the experience, Cube began writing the lyrics that would become "Fuck tha Police". Initially, still spending weekends in jail over traffic violations, Dre was reluctant to do "Fuck tha Police", a reluctance that dissolved once that sentence concluded.

=== Synthesis ===
The album's producers were Dr. Dre with DJ Yella and Arabian Prince. Its production was mostly sampled horn blasts, some funk guitar riffs, sampled vocals, and turntable scratches atop a drum machine. Their drum machine, used for kick, was the Roland TR-808.

=== Vocals ===
N.W.A's Ice Cube and MC Ren, along with Ruthless Records rapper The D.O.C. wrote the lyrics, including those rapped by Eazy-E and by Dr. Dre. Arabian Prince's only rapping contribution on Straight Outta Compton is the closing track "Something 2 Dance 2". "Parental Discretion Iz Advised" features vocals by The D.O.C., making him the only non-official member of N.W.A to rap on the album.

=== Content ===
Reflecting in 2002, Rolling Stone writer Jon Caramanica calls the album a "bombastic, cacophonous car ride through Los Angeles' burnt-out and ignored hoods". In a contemporary review, rather, Mark Holmberg, in the Richmond Times-Dispatch, calls it "a preacher-provoking, mother-maddening, reality-stinks" album that "wallows in gangs, doping, drive-by shootings, brutal sexism, cop slamming and racism". Newsweek wrote, "Hinting at gang roots, and selling themselves on those hints, they project a gangster mystique that pays no attention to where criminality begins and marketing lets off." Even when depicting severe and unprovoked violence, the rappers cite their own stage names as its very perpetrators. By their sheer force, the album's opening three tracks—"Straight Outta Compton", "Fuck tha Police", and "Gangsta Gangsta"—signature songs setting N.W.A's platform, says AllMusic album reviewer Steve Huey, "threaten to dwarf everything that follows".

First, the title track, contains a barrage of anti-police rhetoric, threats of gun violence and invective against scheming women. Then, after a skit of the police put on criminal trial, "Fuck tha Police", alleging chronic harassment and brutality by officers, singularly threatens lethal retaliation. "Gangsta Gangsta" depicts group outings to carouse with women while slurring unwilling women and assaulting men, whether confrontational troublemakers, innocent bystanders, or a driver who, fleeing the failed carjacking, gets shot at. "8 Ball" is dedicated to the 40 oz bottles of malt liquor, Olde English 800. "Express Yourself", written by Cube and rapped by Dre, incidentally scorns weed smoking—already proclaimed by Cube in "Gangsta Gangsta" as his own, chronic practice—which allegedly causes brain damage, a threat to the song's optimistic agenda, liberal individuality. "I Ain't tha 1" scorns spending money on women. "Dopeman" depicts the crack epidemic's aftermath. Closing the album, "Something 2 Dance 2" is upbeat high-octane electro outro track.

The term "gangsta rap", soon to arise in journalism, had not been coined yet. According to Ice Cube, the rappers themselves called it "reality rap". Indicting N.W.A as its leading example, journalist David Mills, in 1990, acknowledges, "The hard-core street rappers defend their violent lyrics as a reflection of 'reality'. But for all the gunshots they mix into their music, rappers rarely try to dramatize that reality" empathetically. "It's easier for them to imagine themselves pulling the trigger." Still, the year before, Bud Norman, reviewing in the Wichita Eagle-Beacon, assesses that on Straight Outta Compton, "they don't make it sound like much fun". In Norman's view, "They describe it with the same nonjudgmental resignation that a Kansan might use about a tornado." Steve Huey, writing for AllMusic, considered that "Straight Outta Compton's insistent claims of reality ring a little hollow today, since it hardly ever depicts consequences. But despite all the romanticized invincibility, the force and detail of Ice Cube's writing makes the exaggerations resonate."

== Release ==
Contrary to internet reports of Straight Outta Compton being released on August 8, 1988, which happened to be around the same time N.W.A was recording the album, RIAA.com cites an official release date of January 25, 1989. This date was also verified by DJ Yella in his 2021 book Straight Outta Compton: My Untold Story, while an official press kit from Priority Records claimed it was "due for release in February, 1989".

Ruthless/Priority Records delayed the album's intended release of mid-to-late 1988 to early 1989 so that it would not interfere with both Eazy-E's solo debut album Eazy-Duz-It and the belated success of N.W.A. and the Posse, the latter of which had not appeared on the Billboard charts until the summer of 1988.

In the United Kingdom, Straight Outta Compton was released by 4th & B'way Records after a period that Roy Wilkinson of Sounds described as "months" of selling well as an import release.

== Critical reception ==
=== Critiques ===
1989 professional ratings
Review scores
Source	Rating
Chicago Tribune	3.5/4 stars
Los Angeles Times	3.5/5 stars
NME	5/10
Q	2/5 stars
Sounds	5/5 stars
The Village Voice	B

Music journalist Greg Kot, reviewing Straight Outta Compton for the Chicago Tribune, finds N.W.A's sound "fuller and funkier" than that of East Coast hip-hop, and their lyrics just as "unforgiving" as those of East Coast group Public Enemy. Los Angeles Times critic Dennis Hunt anticipates that listeners may be offended by the album's lack of "moralizing", "even more so than the searing street language", and advises, "To appreciate this remarkable, disturbing album you have to approach it for what it is—a no-holds-barred, audio-documentary of ghetto life." On the other hand, Cary Darling, in California's Orange County Register, while thinking that the lyrics make Ice-T "look like a Cub Scout", ultimately deems Straight Outta Compton "curiously uninvolving", as it "lacks the insight and passion that put the best work by the likes of Boogie Down Productions, Ice-T and Public Enemy so far ahead of the field". Robert Christgau of The Village Voice perceives N.W.A's persona as calculated: "Right, it's not about salary—it's about royalties, about brandishing scarewords like 'street' and 'crazy' and 'fuck' and 'reality' until suckers black and white cough up the cash."

In the UK, Sounds reviewer Roy Wilkinson declared Straight Outta Compton "rap's answer to Slayer's Reign in Blood—a record the majors were scared to touch", continuing, "This is rock made genuinely wild again. Beware, the pop jive of the current 'Express Yourself' single will in no way prepare you for the Magnum beat that fires here." Other British publications were less enthusiastic. Paolo Hewitt of NME takes issue with the lyrics' "macho repetition and tunnel vision", while in the Hi-Fi News & Record Review, Peter Clark, going further, calls the lyrics "unrelenting in their unpleasantness". Offering the lowest possible rating, Clark adds, "The cumulative effect is like listening to an endless fight next door. The music on this record is without a hint of dynamics or melody." Charlie Dick, writing for Q, contends, "In the wake of Public Enemy and KRS-One, it is amazing that something this lightweight could cause such a stir. The all-mouth-and-trousers content is backed up by likable drum machine twittering, minimal instrumentation and duffish production." Still, he predicts, "This regressive nonsense will be passed off as social commentary by thrill-seekers all across the free world."

Retrospective professional ratings
Review scores
Source	Rating
AllMusic	5/5 stars
Blender	5/5 stars
Mojo	4/5 stars
Pitchfork	9.7/10
Q	4/5 stars
Rolling Stone	5/5 stars
The Rolling Stone Album Guide	5/5 stars
The Source	5/5 stars
Spin Alternative Record Guide	10/10
Uncut	5/5 stars

By 1991, while criticizing group members for allegedly carrying misogynist lyrics into real life, Newsweek incidentally comments that Straight Outta Compton, nonetheless, "introduced some of the most grotesquely exciting music ever made". Writing in retrospect, Steve Huey, in AllMusic, deems the album mainly just "raising hell" while posturing, but finds that "it still sounds refreshingly uncalculated because of its irreverent, gonzo sense of humor, still unfortunately rare in hardcore rap". In the 2004 Rolling Stone Album Guide, Roni Sarig states that although Straight Outta Compton was viewed as a "perversion" of the "more politically sophisticated" style of hip-hop exemplified by Public Enemy, the album displays "a more righteous fury than the hundreds of copycats it spawned".

=== Rankings ===
In 1994, British magazine Hip Hop Connection, placing the album third among rap's best albums, adds, "Straight Outta Compton sounded so exciting, insignificant details such as realism and integrity could be overlooked." Hip-hop magazine The Source included Straight Outta Compton in its 1998 "100 Best Albums" list. Television network VH1, in 2003, placed it 62nd. Spin magazine, sorting the "100 Greatest Albums, 1985–2005", identified it 10th.

The first rap album ever to gain five stars from Rolling Stone at initial review, it placed 70th among the magazine's 500 Greatest Albums of All Time in its 2020 revised list. Time, in 2006, named it one of the 100 greatest albums of all time. Vibe appraised it as one of the 100 Essential Albums of the 20th Century. In 2012, Slant Magazine listed it 18th among the "Best Albums of the 1980s". In November 2016, Straight Outta Compton became the first rap album inducted into the Grammy Hall of Fame. In 2017, Straight Outta Compton was selected for preservation in the United States National Recording Registry by the Library of Congress, who deemed it to be "culturally, historically, or aesthetically significant".

== Commercial performance ==
Released on January 25, 1989, Straight Outta Compton was N.W.A's best selling album; it attained gold certification with half a million copies sold three months after its release. It peaked at number 9 on Billboard's Top R&B/Hip-Hop Albums chart, and on April 15, 1989, at number 37 on the Billboard 200, which ranks the week's most popular albums. On July 18, 1989, the album was certified platinum with one million copies sold. On March 27, 1992, Straight Outta Compton was certified double-platinum with two million copies sold, and on November 11, 2015, it was certified triple-platinum with three million copies sold.

By Priority Records' estimation, about 80% of Straight Outta Compton's sales occurred in suburban areas that were predominantly white.

Approaching the August 2015 release of the film Straight Outta Compton, the album reentered the Billboard 200 at number 173. The next week, it rose to number 97, and another week later it reached number 30, besting its 1989 peak position of 37. On September 5, it peaked on the chart at number 6. Meanwhile, the album's title track entered the Billboard Hot 100 as N.W.A's first song in the Top 40, and spent two weeks at number 38.

== Media presence ==
In 2004, the DigitaArts list 25 Best Albums Covers included Straight Outta Compton. By the album's release, Arabian Prince, seen on the cover, had left N.W.A. Prior to his final departure in January 1989, he had intermittently skipped studio sessions and photoshoots, one of which was a group photo taken by Ithaka Darin Pappas on November 11, 1988, at Pappa's studio apartment in Los Angeles' Miracle Mile district. The photo has been repeatedly republished in media. Pappas calls it "The Miracle Mile Shot", It has been seen on The Source's May 1989 cover, the DVD cover of the 2015 documentary Kings Of Compton, in France's Musée d'art contemporain de Marseille from 2017 to 2018, and as a backdrop at N.W.A's Rock and Roll Hall of Fame induction ceremony in 2016 in Brooklyn, New York.

Sinéad O'Connor, then herself controversial, appraised in 1990 that "It's definitely the best rap record I've ever heard." But, feeling that he had rushed its production, N.W.A's own Dr. Dre, in a 1993 interview, remarked, "To this day, I can't stand that album. I threw that thing together in six weeks so we could have something to sell out of the trunk." Additionally, he said, "Back then, I thought the choruses were supposed to just be me scratching."

== Track listing ==
All songs produced by Dr. Dre, DJ Yella, and Arabian Prince.

Original release
No.	Title	Writer(s)	Length
1.	"Straight Outta Compton"	Eric Wright; Andre Young; O'Shea Jackson; Lorenzo Patterson	4:18
2.	"Fuck tha Police (Note: Often censored as "____ tha Police (Fill In The Blanks)", "F___ tha Police" or "F**k tha Police".)"	Young; Jackson; Patterson; Harry Whitaker; Dejon Aguayo	5:44
3.	"Gangsta Gangsta"	Wright; Young; Jackson; Patterson; Steve Arrington; Charles Carter; Roger Parker; Buddy Hankerson; William DeVaughn; Andrew Noland; Walter Morrison; Gregory Webster; Leroy Bonner; Marshall Jones; Ralph Middlebrooks; Norman Napier; Marvin Pierce	5:36
4.	"If It Ain't Ruff"	Young; Patterson; Leroy Mitchell	3:34
5.	"Parental Discretion Iz Advised"	Wright; Jackson; Patterson	5:15
6.	"8 Ball (Remix)"	Young; Jackson; Ronnie Hudson; Mikel Hooks; Roger Troutman; Larry Troutman	4:52
7.	"Something Like That"	Young; Patterson	3:35
8.	"Express Yourself"	Young; Jackson; Charles Wright	4:25
9.	"Compton's N the House (Remix)"	Wright; Jackson; Patterson	5:20
10.	"I Ain't Tha 1"	Jackson; Randy Muller	4:54
11.	"Dopeman (Remix)"	Young; Jackson; Webster; Morrison; Bonner; Middlebrooks; Noland; Jones; Napier; Pierce; Dedrick Rolison; Ant Banks	5:20
12.	"Quiet on tha Set"	Young; Patterson	3:59
13.	"Something 2 Dance 2"	Wright; Young; Kim Nazel; Sylvester Stewart	3:24
Total length:			60:16

- On vinyl issues of the album, "8 Ball (Remix)", "Something Like That" and "Something 2 Dance 2" are excluded from the track listing.

2002 reissue bonus tracks
No.	Title	Writer(s)	Length
14.	"Express Yourself" (extended mix)	Jackson; Patterson	4:42
15.	"Bonus Beats"	Young; Nazel; Antoine Carraby	3:03
16.	"Straight Outta Compton" (extended mix)	Wright; Young; Jackson; Patterson	4:53
17.	"A Bitch Iz a Bitch"	Jackson	3:10

2007 reissue (20th Anniversary Edition) bonus tracks
No.	Title	Performer(s)	Length
14.	"---- tha Police" (tribute remix)	Bone Thugs-n-Harmony	5:02
15.	"Gangsta Gangsta" (tribute remix)	Snoop Dogg; C-Murder	4:39
16.	"Dopeman" (tribute remix)	Mack 10	4:01
17.	"If It Ain't Ruff" (tribute remix)	WC	3:44
18.	"Compton's n the House" (live)	Dr. Dre; MC Ren	2:02

== Personnel ==
Credits adapted from Tidal and AllMusic.

N.W.A.

- Eazy-E – rapping (tracks 1–3, 5, 6, 9, 11–13), spoken word (tracks 1–3, 10, 12), co-producer (track 6), executive producer
- Ice Cube – rapping (tracks 1–3, 5, 10, 11), spoken word (tracks 2, 8)
- MC Ren – rapping (tracks 1–5, 7, 9, 12), spoken word (tracks 2, 3, 7, 9)
- Dr. Dre – rapping (tracks 5, 7–9, 11, 13), spoken word (tracks 1–3, 7–9), keyboards and drum programming
- DJ Yella – sampling, turntables, drum programming
- Arabian Prince – rapping (track 13), keyboards and drum programming (tracks 1–3, 7, 9, 13)

Additional musicians

- The D.O.C. – rapping (track 5), spoken word (track 2)
- Krazy Dee – spoken word (tracks 2, 3, 11)

Studio personnel

- Big Bass Brian – mastering
- Donovan Sound – engineer
- Eric Poppleton – photography
- Helane Freeman – art direction

== Charts ==
Chart (1989)	Peak position
US Billboard Top LPs	37
US Billboard Top Soul LPs	9
Chart (1991)	Peak position
Australian Albums (ARIA)	51
New Zealand Albums (RMNZ)	43
Chart (2003)	Peak position
Irish Albums Chart	20
UK Albums Chart	35
Chart (2015–16)	Peak position
Australian Albums (ARIA)	8
Austrian Albums (Ö3 Austria)	55
French Albums (SNEP)	17
German Albums (Offizielle Top 100)	36
Irish Albums (IRMA)	7
Italian Vinyl Records (FIMI)	15
Norwegian Albums (VG-lista)	38
Swiss Albums (Schweizer Hitparade)	54
UK R&B Albums (Official Charts)	6
US Billboard 200	4
Chart (2026)	Peak position
Hungarian Physical Albums (MAHASZ)	25

== Certifications ==
Region	Certification	Certified units/sales
Italy (FIMI)	Gold	25,000^{‡}
United Kingdom (BPI)	Platinum	300,000^{‡}
United States (RIAA)	3× Platinum	3,000,000^{^}
^{^} Shipments figures based on certification alone.^{‡} Sales+streaming figures based on certification alone.

== See also ==
- Album era
- Straight Outta Compton: N.W.A 10th Anniversary Tribute
