= Stone Jam =

1980 studio album by Slave

Studio album by Slave
- Released: November 1980
- Genre: Funk
- Label: Cotillion
- Producers: Jimmy Douglass, Steve Washington

Slave chronology
| Just a Touch of Love (1979) | Stone Jam (1980) | Show Time (1981) |

Stone Jam is the fifth album by the American funk band Slave. It was released in 1980 on Cotillion Records and reissued in 1997 on Rhino Records. It was produced by Jimmy Douglass and Steve Washington. The album was listed on the Billboard 200, Billboard's 1981 Year-End Chart and was certified Gold by the RIAA. It contains the hit singles "Sizzlin' Hot", "Feel My Love", and "Watching You".

== Overview ==
Slave's fifth album, Stone Jam, was their highest charting since their first, Slave, and their second to be certified Gold, Slave received the certification in 1977. The band's drummer, Steve Arrington, took on more singing responsibilities than on previous albums and this, combined with the vocals of Starleana Young, contributed to the album's success. The single "Watching You" entered the Billboard Hot 100 and also joined "Sizzlin' Hot" and "Feel My Love" on the R&B Singles Chart.

== Reception and accolades ==
Professional ratings
Review scores
| Source | Rating |
|---|---|
| AllMusic | 4/5 stars |

The Morning Call deemed the album "musically boring," but conceded that "Sizzlin' Hot" and "Let's Spend Some Time" "may cut it on the dance floor."

Alex Henderson of AllMusic breaks Slave's brand of funk into two categories; 'hardcore' and 'sophisticated'. He notes that their earlier work falls into the former category but, with the exception of the tracks "Stone Jam" and "Sizzlin' Hot", this album is in the later. He goes on to write that this "sleeker" approach is "every bit as appealing" as their earlier more aggressive work. He describes the tracks "Dreamin'", "Feel My Love" and "Let's Spend Some Time" as "addictive jams" and the album as "consistently melodic".

Jam-Master Jay of Run–D.M.C. has named it as one of his favorite albums. The album made the Billboard 1981 Year-End Pop Chart at number 99 and the Soul Chart at number 7.

The song "Watching You" was interpolated twice by rapper Snoop Dogg, first in the chorus of "Gin and Juice" in 1993, then in "Let's Get Blown" in 2004.

== Tracks ==
1. "Let's Spend Some Time" (Mark Antone Adams/Jimmy Douglass/Mark Hicks/Jennifer Ivory/Curt Jones/Ray Turner/Steve Washington/Starleana Young) – 4:38
2. "Feel My Love" (Adams/Steve Arrington/Hicks/Jones/Turner/Washington/Danny Webster) – 4:31
3. "Starting Over" (Adams/Hicks/Jones/Floyd Miller/Turner/Young) – 4:27
4. "Sizzlin' Hot" (Adams/Arrington/Miller/Turner/Washington/Webster) – 5:07
5. "Watching You" (Adams/Arrington/Turner/Washington/Webster) – 4:41
6. "Dreamin'" (Adams/Arrington/Jones/Miller/Turner/Washington) – 4:20
7. "Never Get Away" (Adams/Arrington/Hicks/Jones/Turner/Webster) – 5:09
8. "Stone Jam" (Adams/Hicks/Jones/Turner/Washington/Webster/Young) – 6:43

Bonus tracks

9. "Feel My Love" (Disco Mix) – 4:47
10. "Sizzlin' Hot" (Single Version) – 4:06
11. "Watching You" (Single Version) – 3:28

== Personnel ==
- Mark Antone Adams – assistant producer, bass guitar
- Steve Arrington – drums, percussion, vocals
- Charles Carter – assistant producer, saxophone
- Bill-Dog Dooley – assistant engineer
- Jimmy Douglass – arranger, engineer, mixing, producer, vocals
- Bob Heimall – art direction, design
- Mark Hicks – guitar
- Bill Inglot – remastering
- Jennifer Ivory – assistant executive producer
- Curt Jones – guitar, vocals
- Tom Lockett – assistant engineer, saxophone, vocals
- Randy Mason – assistant engineer
- David McLees – reissue producer
- Floyd Miller – horn, percussion, trombone, vocals
- Ray Turner – keyboards
- Rickey Vincent – liner notes
- Steve Washington – arranger, assistant engineer, executive producer, mixing, producer, trumpet, vocals
- Danny Webster – guitar, vocals
- Starleana Young – vocals

== Charts and sales certification ==
=== Album charts ===
| Year | Chart | Peak |
|---|---|---|
| 1981 | Billboard 200 | 53 |
| 1981 | R&B Albums | 5 |

=== Single charts ===
| Year | Single | Chart | Peak |
|---|---|---|---|
| 1980 | "Sizzlin' Hot" | R&B Singles Chart | 57 |
| 1981 | "Feel My Love" | R&B Singles Chart | 62 |
| 1981 | "Watching You" | R&B Singles Chart | 6 |
| 1981 | "Watching You" | Billboard Hot 100 | 78 |

=== RIAA certification ===
| Format | Certification | Date |
|---|---|---|
| Album | Gold | 30 March 1981 |

== Release history ==
| Year | Format | Label | Catalog |
|---|---|---|---|
| 1980 | Vinyl | Cotillion | SD 5224 |
| 1997 | CD | Rhino | 72625 |
