= Friday After Next (soundtrack) =

Friday After Next (Original Soundtrack)

Soundtrack album by various artists
- Released: November 19, 2002
- Genres: Hip hop; R&B; christmas music
- Length: 56:53
- Label: Hollywood
- Producers: Ice Cube (exec.); Matt Alvarez (exec.); Mitch Rotter; Mitchell Leib; Spring Aspers

Professional ratings
Review scores
Source	Rating
AllMusic	3/5 stars
HipHopDX	3/5

Friday After Next (Original Soundtrack) is the soundtrack album to Marcus Raboy's 2002 Christmas-themed comedy film Friday After Next. It was released on November 19, 2002 via Hollywood Records. Produced by Mitch Rotter, Mitchell Leib and Spring Aspers with Ice Cube and Matt Alvarez as executive producers, the album is composed of hip hop, contemporary R&B and christmas music.

The soundtrack features contributions from Calvin Richardson, Flipmode Squad, F.T., G-Unit, K-Mont, Kokane, Krayzie Bone, LaReece, Nappy Roots, Roscoe, Tha Eastsidaz, Westside Connection, Whateva, Donny Hathaway, Eartha Kitt, Leon Haywood, Slave, The Temptations.

It peaked at number 115 on the Billboard 200, number 23 on the Top R&B/Hip-Hop Albums chart and number 8 on the Top Soundtracks chart in the United States.

== Track listing ==
No.	Title	Writer(s)	Length
1.	"It's the Holidaze" (performed by Westside Connection)	O'Shea Jackson; Dedrick Rolison; William Calhoun; Dallas Austin	3:57
2.	"Just Chill" (performed by Flipmode Squad featuring Busta Rhymes, Rah Digga and Spliff)	Roger McNair; William Lewis; Rashia Fisher; Leroy Jones; Trevor Smith; Gerard Harmon; Keith Wilkins	3:43
3.	"High Times (Ride with Us)" (performed by FT featuring Tha Eastsidaz)	Farid Nassar	4:23
4.	"Got All'at" (performed by Nappy Roots)	Melvin Adams; Kenneth Anthony; William Hughes; Brian Scott; Ronald Wilson; James Chambers	3:39
5.	"Wonderful World" (performed by Krayzie Bone featuring LaReece and K-Mont)	Anthony Henderson; Kimberly Ward; Germaine Hargrove; Nassar	4:27
6.	"Bad News" (performed by 50 Cent featuring G-Unit)	Curtis Jackson; Christopher Lloyd; Marvin Bernard; Michael J. Clervoix	4:21
7.	"Mardi Gras" (performed by Rockwilder Presents Whateva)	Desmond A. Douglas; Dana Stinson	3:33
8.	"Get Ready" (performed by Roscoe featuring Mr. Kane)	David Williams; Jerry Buddy Long Jr.; Ted A. Hogan	4:03
9.	"Go to the Club" (performed by Calvin Richardson)	Calvin Richardson	4:13
10.	"I Want'a Do Something Freaky to You" (performed by Leon Haywood)	Leon Haywood	3:46
11.	"Slide" (performed by Slave)	Mark Antone Adams; Carter Bradley; Tim Dozier; Mark Hicks; Tom Lockett; Floyd Miller; Steve Washington; Danny Webster	6:51
12.	"This Christmas" (performed by Donny Hathaway)	Donny Hathaway; Nadine McKinnor	4:10
13.	"Santa Baby" (performed by Eartha Kitt)	Joan Javits; Philip Springer; Tony Springer	3:24
14.	"Silent Night" (performed by The Temptations)	Franz Xaver Gruber; Joseph Mohr	2:23
Total length:			56:53

== Charts ==
Chart (2002)	Peak position
US Billboard 200	115
US Top R&B/Hip-Hop Albums (Billboard)	23
US Top Soundtracks (Billboard)	8
