= Feel So Real =

Feel So Real may refer to:

- "Feel So Real", a song by Steve Arrington from the 1985 album Dancin' in the Key of Life
- "Feel So Real", a song by Dream Frequency from the 1992 album One Nation

== See also ==
- "Feels So Real (Won't Let Go)", a song by Patrice Rushen from the 1984 album Now
- "Feeling So Real", a 1994 single by Moby
