= Steve Arrington's Hall of Fame, Vol.1 =

Studio album by Steve Arrington's Hall of Fame
- Released: February 7, 1983
- Recorded: 1982–1983 Atlantic Studios, Boogie Hotel & Port Jefferson, New York City, New York
- Genre: R&B, funk
- Label: Atlantic Records
- Producer: Steve Arrington Jimmy Douglass Charles Carter

Steve Arrington's Hall of Fame chronology
Steve Arrington's Hall of Fame, Vol.1 (1983)	Steve Arrington's Hall of Fame: Positive Power (1984)

Steve Arrington's Hall of Fame, Vol.1 is the debut album by Steve Arrington and his band, credited as Steve Arrington's Hall of Fame. By 1982, Arrington had been in Slave for almost five years and was ready to go solo. He formed his band simply called Steve Arrington's Hall of Fame and went to work on their debut album. Released in 1983, the album reached number 12 on the Top Soul Albums charts in 1983.

== Reception ==
Professional ratings
Review scores
Source	Rating
AllMusic	4/5 stars
Christgau's Record Guide	B+

Reviewing the album in Record, Vince Aletti called Steve Arrington's Hall of Fame, Vol. 1 "not just the best funk debut of the year so far, but an album appealing and original enough that even veterans will find it hard to beat." He picked "Nobody Can Be You" as the highlight for its unexpectedly introspective lyrics and tight instrumental production, but said that the entire album is full of fresh songs which eschew funk cliches and benefit from Arrington's unpredictable vocals, commenting that, "Arrington's singing keeps you on edge, alert to its changing coloration, its swift kicks and cool caresses, often delivered when you least expect them."

== Track listing ==
1. "Nobody Can Be You" - (Steve Arrington, Charles Carter) 5:16
2. "You Meet My Approval" - (Arrington, C. Carter) 5:30
3. "Last Nite/Nite Before" - (Arrington, Sam Carter) 4:45
4. "Strange (Soft & Hard)" - (Arrington) 4:27
5. "Speak with Your Body" - (Arrington, C. Carter) 5:22
6. "Weak at the Knees" - (Arrington, Buddy Hankerson, C. Carter, Roger Parker) 5:21
7. "Beddie-Biey" - (Arrington, Hankerson, Victor Godsey) 4:04
8. "Way Out" - (Arrington, S. Carter) 4:22

== Personnel ==
- Steve Arrington - lead and backing vocals, bass, drums, rhythm guitar, keyboards
- Charles Carter - keyboards, saxophone, backing vocals
- Bruce Victor Godsey - flute, keyboards, backing vocals
- Buddy Hankerson - bass, backing vocals
- Roger Parker - drums, backing vocals
- Kevin Eubanks - bass, guitar
- Gary Jackson - percussion, backing vocals
- Arthur Rhames - guitar
- Sam Carter - keyboards, African calls

== Charts ==
Chart (1983)	Peak position
Billboard Pop Albums	101
Billboard Top Soul Albums	12

=== Singles ===
Year	Single	Chart positions	
Year	Single	US R&B	US Dance
1982	"Way Out"	68	49
1983	"Nobody Can Be You"	18	23
1983	"Weak at the Knees"	33	—

== Samples and covers ==
- N.W.A sampled "Weak at the Knees" in the song "Gangsta Gangsta" on their album Straight Outta Compton in 1988.
- Ice Cube sampled "Weak at the Knees" in his song "The Nigga You Love to Hate" on his album AmeriKKKa's Most Wanted in 1990.
- A Tribe Called Quest sampled "Beddie-Biey" in the song "The Chase, Part II" on their album Midnight Marauders in 1993.
- Shaquille O'Neal sampled "Nobody Can Be You" in his song "Nobody" on his album Shaq Fu: Da Return in 1994.
- Jermaine Dupri and Jay-Z sampled "Weak at the Knees" in the song "Money Ain't a Thang" on their albums Life in 1472 and Vol. 2... Hard Knock Life in 1998.
- 3 X Dope sampled "Weak at the Knees" in the song Weak at the Knees on their album Live from Acknickulous Land in 1990.
