= The Miracle Mile Shot =

2018 film

- Official Film Festival Poster
- Directed by: Ithaka Darin Pappas
- Produced by: Craig Raidor Dahl
- Starring: Dr. Dre, Eazy-E, Ice Cube, DJ Yella, Mc Ren, Snoop Dogg, Kendrick Lamar
- Production company: Sweatlodge Films
- Release date: June 19, 2019
- Running time: 9 minutes
- Country: United States/Greece
- Language: English titles (no dialogue)

The Miracle Mile Shot is an experimental short subject, non-dialogue documentary film based entirely on a single photograph of the influential Gangsta rap group N.W.A. created on November 11, 1988, in the Miracle Mile area of Los Angeles, California, by photographer/artist Ithaka Darin Pappas. The photograph itself, also entitled The Miracle Mile Shot, was captured during a photo session that took place at the photographer's home studio apartment at 6516 1/2 Orange Street, Los Angeles. The short film, screened for the first time at the LAGFF on June 19, 2019, visually tells the story (with the aid of music and printed text) of the most important uses of the photograph in chronological order.

== History of the photograph ==
As depicted in The Miracle Mile Shot, the photograph began its existence being used as the official press image for N.W.A's 1989 album, Straight Outta Compton (distributed by Priority Records), a record that would eventually go Triple Platinum. At the time of Straight Outta Compton's release, The Miracle Mile Shot was published numerous times. In May 1989, The Miracle Mile Shot appeared simultaneously on covers of the magazines Rap Master and The Source.

== Rising presence ==
As time went on and N.W.A.'s global influence and relevance continued to rise, the image was used numerously in historical content. In 2008, VH1 featured the picture in their documentary entitled The World's Most Dangerous Group directed by Mark Ford. The Miracle Mile Shot was also used in the CD booklet of the special edition remastered Straight Outta Compton re-release in 2002, as well as on the DVD cover of the documentary called N.W.A. & Eazy-E: Kings Of Compton directed by Mike Corbera and Andre Relis. According to The Miracle Mile Shot's written titles and imagery, in 2014, the photograph was used in the casting process of the feature Straight Outta Compton to match present-day actors with the appearance N.W.A. members DJ Yella, Dr. Dre, Eazy-E, Ice Cube and Mc ren in their early 20s. These roles would eventually be filled by O'Shea Jackson Jr., Corey Hawkins, Jason Mitchell, Aldis Hodge and Neil Brown Jr.

=== Snoop Dogg at the premiere of Straight Outta Compton ===
On August 10, 2015, rapper Snoop Dogg attended the Los Angeles premiere of the N.W.A. biopic feature film entitled Straight Outta Compton, directed by F. Gary Gray wearing a self-produced, one-of-a-kind long-sleeve t-shirt with The Miracle Mile photograph printed on the front of it. Los Angeles Magazine said of his attire, "Snoop Dogg broke out his N.W.A. t-shirt for last night's world premiere of Straight Outta Compton at the Microsoft Theater L.A."

Later in 2015 and 2016, after Straight Outta Compton became a #1 film in U.S. theaters and also the announcement of N.W.A.'s impending induction into the Rock and Roll Hall of Fame, the international presence of The Miracle Mile Shot picture grew substantially. It was published in several more major U.S. newspapers, websites and magazines, including Los Angeles Times, Los Angeles (magazine), Houston Chronicle, Chicago Tribune, Detroit Free Press, HipHopDX and Rolling Stone as well as Rimas E Batidas and Blitz magazine in Portugal.

=== The Miracle Mile Shot and the Rock n Roll Hall of Fame ===
On February 22, 2016, Ice Cube posted The Miracle Mile Shot on his official Instagram page with the caption, "Kendrick Lamar will induct N.W.A at the Rock n Roll hall of Fame Induction Ceremony airing 4/30 on HBO. The picture was also published as a double-page spread in the official printed program book of the event. On March 29, 2019, at the ceremony itself, Kendrick Lamar presented the award to N.W.A. in front of a fifteen-meter-high projection of the Miracle Mile Shot that remained as the main backdrop of the entire N.W.A. segment of the presentation.

=== The Defiant Ones ===
In the 2017, The Miracle Mile Shot and other images from the same photo session were featured in the four-part television documentary called The Defiant Ones about Doctor Dre and business partner Jimmy Iovine. The project was produced by Silverback Productions and directed by Allen Hughes for HBO

=== Museum Of Contemporary Art in Marseille, France ===
In early 2018, an original print of The Miracle Mile Shot traveled to Musée d'Art Contemporain in Marseille, France as part of the exhibit "Hip-Hop : Un Age d'Or" organized by French rapper, producer, curator Siba Giba.

== The making of The Miracle Mile Shot photograph ==
The Miracle Mile Shot was photographed on Hasselblad 500 CE camera with an 80 mm lens and Norman and Chimera lighting equipment. During the same session promotional images of the young female rapper, Big Lady K were made, and images of Eazy E for the cover of his single, "Eazy-Duz-It", were also created.

In an interview article published by The Hundreds on September 30, 2015. written by Manos Nomikos entitled, Meet the Greek-American Artist Who Shot N.W.A's Earliest Promo Photos, photographer Ithaka Darin Pappas speaks of the session, "That first Miracle Mile shoot of N.W.A was fun as hell. It was a low-budget thing, all the sessions were, so we shot at my apartment. I lived near Fairfax and Wilshire at the time in a quiet, mostly old folks neighborhood known as Miracle Mile. And the boyz rolled up in Eazy's GMC Safari van with chrome wheels, music blasting to distortion, and the neighbors were just horrified, especially my downstairs landlord. But forget him anyway for raising my rent that month! Dj Speed was also there and Big Lady K. We had Nacho Cheese Doritos for lunch and some O.E. Good times.

In another interview given to Daniel Cutler entitled Blazedmade Interview: Ithaka Darin Pappas (Part 1/2) on October 30, 2018, Ithaka spoke again of the Miracle Mile photo session, "That photo is known as The Miracle Mile Shot. It was my first time photographing N.W.A and my first time shooting for Priority Records. It was intended to be the shoot for the cover of Eazy-E's single “We Want Eazy". We were also trying to get publicity photos of N.W.A, as a group, which I didn't get a whole lot of that day. We were also doing some publicity photos for Big Lady and she came by the shoot as well. I was already a big N.W.A fan. Gangsta Gangsta was blowing up KDAY which was the main radio station at the time. I mean, I was really listening to this stuff a lot. Then suddenly these guys (N.W.A) were in my living room a couple weeks later. It was pretty cool."

== Soundtrack songs ==
"Peace Palace Porridge", "Escape From The City Of Angels", "Radiografia", "Roula's Revenge"
