= Breakin' the Funk =

Studio album by Faze-O
- Released: 1979
- Studio: Fifth Floor
- Genre: Funk, soul
- Label: She
- Producer: Clarence Satchell

Faze-O chronology
Good Thang (1978)	Breakin' the Funk (1979)

Professional ratings
Review scores
Source	Rating
AllMusic	2/5 stars

Breakin' the Funk is the third album by American funk band Faze-O. It was released in 1979 on She Records, a subsidiary of Atlantic Records. The album was produced by Clarence Satchell.

== Track listing ==
1. Breakin' the Funk - 6:00 (Keith Harrison, Ralph Aikens Jr., Robert Neal Jr.)
2. Ya-ba-da-ba-duzie - 6:10 (Harrison, Neal Jr., Clarence Satchell)
3. I Still Love You - 6:00 (Harrison, Neal Jr.)
4. Let's Rock - 6:40 (Satchell, Harrison, Aikens Jr., Frederick Crum)
5. I'm Thankful - 6:10 (Harrison, Neal Jr.)
6. See You Through the Night - 4:52 (Satchell, Harrison, Aikens Jr., Neal Jr., Roger Parker)

== Personnel ==
- Robert Neal, Jr: Vocals, Percussion
- Harry McLoud: Rhythm Guitar
- Ralph Aikens Jr.: Rhythm and Lead Guitar, Vocals
- Keith Harrison: Keyboards, Moog and String Synthesizer, Acoustic and Electric Pianos, Clavinet, Percussion, Vocals
- Randy Brecker: Trumpet
- Frederick Tyrone Crum: Bass, Backing Vocals
- Roger Parker: Drums, Percussion
- Strings arranged by Mitch Farber

Production

- Arranged by Keith Harrison
- Produced by Clarence Satchell
- Recorded by Gary Clapp
- Mixed at Mediasound by Michael Brauer
- Mastered at Sterling Sound by Ted Jensen
- All songs copyright Match Publishing (BMI)
