= Good Thang (album) =

Album by Faze-O

Studio album by Faze-O
- Released: 1978
- Genre: Funk
- Label: She

Faze-O chronology
Riding High (1977)	Good Thang (1978)	Breakin' the Funk (1979)

Professional ratings
Review scores
Source	Rating
AllMusic	2.5/5 stars

Good Thang is the second album by the American funk band Faze-O, released in 1978.

== Track listing ==
1. Good Thang - 7:38
2. Who Loves You - 12:20
3. Space People - 4:31
4. Party Time - 5:10
5. Love Me Girl - 5:05
6. Funky Lady - 5:55

== Personnel ==
- Keith Harrison - Vocals, ARP & Minimoog synths, Clavinet, Acoustic and Fender Rhodes electric piano, percussion
- Ralph "Love" Aikens, Jr. - Lead Guitar, Talk Box, Lead and Backing Vocals
- Frederick Tyrone Crum - Bass
- Robert Neal, Jr. - Percussion, Lead and Backing Vocals
- Roger Parker - Drums, Percussion
- Eddie "Bongo" Brown - Bongos
- Allejo Poveda - Latin Percussion
- Billy Beck - Keyboards
- Clarence "Satch" Satchell - Tenor Saxophone, Trumpet
- Jack Kramer - Trumpet
- Clarence Willis - Rhythm Guitar
