= The Hardness of the World =

Studio album by Slave
- Released: December 1977
- Recorded: 1977
- Studios: House of Music, West Orange, New Jersey
- Genres: Soul, funk
- Label: Cotillion
- Producers: Jeff Dixon, Slave

Slave chronology
Slave (1977)	The Hardness of the World (1977)	The Concept (1978)

Professional ratings
Review scores
Source	Rating
AllMusic	3/5 stars
The Rolling Stone Album Guide	2.5/5 stars

The Hardness of the World is the second album by the American funk band Slave, released in 1977, their second album release that year. The lead single "The Party Song" reached number 22 on the Billboard Hot Soul Singles chart.

== Track listing ==
1. "Life Can Be Happy" (4:16)
2. "The Great American Funk Song" (3:50)
3. "Can't Get Enough of You" (4:07)
4. "Baby Sinister" (6:45)
5. "The World's on Hard" (3:26)
6. "The Party Song" (4:07)
7. "We Can Make Love" (5:28)
8. "Volcano Rupture" (6:23)

== Charts ==
Chart (1978)	Peak position
Billboard Pop Albums	67
Billboard Top Soul Albums	31

=== Singles ===
Year	Single	Chart positions	
Year	Single	Billboard Hot 100	US R&B
1978	"The Party Song"	110	22
1978	"Baby Sinister"	—	74
