= Slave (Slave album) =

Studio album by Slave
- Released: April 1977
- Recorded: 1977
- Studio: Century Sound (Sayreville, New Jersey)
- Genres: Funk; soul; disco; R&B
- Length: 43:34
- Label: Cotillion
- Producer: Jeff Dixon

Slave chronology
Slave (1977)	The Hardness of the World (1977)

Singles from Slave
- 1. "Slide" Released: 1977; 2. "You And Me" Released: 1977

Professional ratings
Review scores
Source	Rating
AllMusic	4/5 stars

Slave is the self-titled debut studio album by the American R&B/funk band Slave. It was released in 1977 through Cotillion Records. Recording sessions took place at Century Sound Studios in Sayreville, New Jersey. Production was handled by Jeff Dixon.

The album peaked at number 22 on the Billboard 200 and number six on the Top R&B/Hip-Hop Albums. It was certified gold by the Recording Industry Association of America on June 14, 1977. Its lead single, "Slide", made it to number 32 on the Billboard Hot 100, topped the US Hot R&B/Hip-Hop Songs chart, and also reached number 58 in Canadian Singles Chart.

== Track listing ==
All tracks are written by Stephen C. Washington, Mark Hicks, Mark Leslie Adams, Daniel Webster, Tom Dozier, Floyd Miller, Tom Lockett Jr., Orion Wilhoite and Carter Bradley.

No.	Title	Length
1.	"Slide"	6:47
2.	"Screw Your Wig on Tite"	5:29
3.	"Party Hardy"	3:42
4.	"Son of Slide"	5:29
5.	"You and Me"	6:41
6.	"Love Me"	4:39
7.	"The Happiest Days"	5:17
8.	"Separated"	5:30
Total length:		43:34

No.	Title	Length
9.	"Slide" (Single Version)	3:21
Total length:		47:02

== Personnel ==
- Floyd "The Brother Slide" Miller – lead and backing vocals, percussion, trumpet, trombone
- Daniel "Danny" Webster – lead and backing vocals, lead and rhythm guitar
- Mark "Drac" Hicks – backing vocals, lead and rhythm guitar
- Carter Charles Bradley – keyboards
- Mark Leslie "Mr. Mark"/"The Hansolor" Adams – bass
- Tom Lockett Jr. – alto and tenor saxophone
- Orion "Bimmy" Wilhoite – alto and tenor saxophone
- Stephen C. "The Fearless Leader" Washington – backing vocals, percussion, trumpet, concept
- Tom "Tiny" Dozier – lead vocals, drums, percussion

Production

- Jeff Dixon – producer, concept
- Bob Ligotino – recording
- Jimmy Douglass – re-mixing
- Abie Sussman – art direction
- Bob Defrin – art direction
- Shig Ikeda – photography
- Benno Friedman – photography

== Charts ==
=== Weekly charts ===
Chart (1977)	Peak position
US Billboard 200	22
US Top R&B/Hip-Hop Albums (Billboard)	6

=== Year-end charts ===
Chart (1977)	Position
US Billboard 200	65
US Top R&B/Hip-Hop Albums (Billboard)	17

== Certifications ==
Region	Certification	Certified units/sales
United States (RIAA)	Gold	500,000^{^}
^{^} Shipments figures based on certification alone.
