= The Concept =

Studio album by Slave
- Released: August 1978
- Recorded: 1978
- Studios: Atlantic, New York City
- Genres: Funk, soul
- Length: 43:52
- Label: Cotillion
- Producers: Jeff Dixon, Stephen Washington

Slave chronology
The Hardness of the World (1977)	The Concept (1978)	Just a Touch of Love (1979)

Professional ratings
Review scores
Source	Rating
AllMusic	4/5 stars
Christgau's Record Guide	B
Omaha World-Herald	4/5 stars
The Rolling Stone Album Guide	2.5/5 stars

The Concept is the third album by the American funk band Slave, released in 1978. The album reached number eleven on Billboard's Top Soul Albums chart. It was the band's first album to include Steve Arrington and Starleana Young on vocals.

The cover artwork was inspired by William Blake's The Ancient of Days (1794).

== Track listing ==
1. "Stellar Fungk" (8:43)
2. "The Way You Love Is Heaven" (4:33)
3. "Thank You Lord" (1:31)
4. "Drac Is Back" (3:59)
5. "We've Got Your Party" (4:49)
6. "Just Freak" (7:56)
7. "Coming Soon" (6:20)

== Charts ==
Chart (1978)	Peak position
Billboard Pop Albums	78
Billboard Top Soul Albums	11

=== Singles ===
Year	Single	Chart positions
Year	Single	US R&B
1978	"Stellar Fungk"	14
