= Coming Back for More =

Studio album by William Bell
- Released: 1977
- Genre: Soul
- Label: Mercury
- Producer: William Bell and Paul Mitchell

William Bell chronology
Relating (1974)	Coming Back for More (1977)	It's Time You Took Another Listen (1977)

Coming Back for More is a studio album by American soul singer William Bell, released in 1977. Most of the songs were written by Bell and co-producer Paul Mitchell. The album contains Bell's most commercially successful song, "Tryin' to Love Two".

The album peaked at No. 63 on the Billboard 200.

== Critical reception ==
Professional ratings
Review scores
Source	Rating
AllMusic	4/5 stars
The Encyclopedia of Popular Music	3/5 stars
The Rolling Stone Record Guide	3/5 stars

AllMusic called the album "arguably the artistic and commercial peak of [Bell's] entire career."

== Track listing ==
Side one

1. "Tryin' to Love Two" (William Bell, Paul Mitchell)
2. "If Sex Was All We Had" (William Bell, Paul Mitchell)
3. "Relax" (William Bell, Paul Mitchell)
4. "You Don't Miss Your Water" (William Bell, Traditional, Steve Young)
5. "Malnutrition" (William Bell, Paul Mitchell)

Side two

1. "Coming Back for More" (William Bell, Paul Mitchell)
2. "Just Another Way to Feel" (Paul Mitchell)
3. "I Absotively, Posolutely Love You" (William Bell, Paul Mitchell)
4. "I Wake Up Cryin'" (Burt Bacharach, Hal David)
5. "You've Really Got a Hold on Me" (Smokey Robinson)
