= Show Time (Slave album) =

Studio album by Slave
- Released: October 19, 1981
- Recorded: 1981
- Studios: Atlantic (New York City)
- Genres: R&B, post-disco, funk, soul
- Label: Cotillion
- Producer: Jimmy Douglass

Slave chronology
Stone Jam (1980)	Show Time (1981)	Visions of the Lite (1982)

Professional ratings
Review scores
Source	Rating
AllMusic	4.5/5 stars
Robert Christgau	A−
The Rolling Stone Album Guide	3.5/5 stars

Show Time is the sixth album by the American funk band Slave, released in 1981. Show Time was the last album that singer/drummer Steve Arrington recorded with the band. The album reached number seven on the Top Soul Albums charts. The lead single, "Snap Shot", reached number six on the Soul Singles charts.

== Track listing ==
1. "Snap Shot" 4:43 (Mark Adams, Steve Arrington, Charles Carter, Jimmy Douglass, Floyd Miller)
2. "Party Lites" 4:55 (Adams, Arrington, Carter, Webster)
3. "Spice of Life" 4:57 (Douglas, S. Carter, Arrington)
4. "Smokin'" 5:25 (S. Carter, Webster, Arrington)
5. "Wait for Me" 5:18 (Adams, Arrington, Carter, Webster)
6. "Steal Your Heart" 5:24 (Adams, Arrington, Carter, Douglass, Webster)
7. "For the Love of U" 5:08 (Adams, Arrington, Carter, Carter, Miller, Webster)
8. "Funken Town" 3:46 (C. Carter, Webster, Miller, Johnson, Parker, S. Carter, Arrington)

== 2022 CD reissue bonus tracks ==
1. "Wait for Me" (7" Version) 3:40
2. "Snap Shot" (12" Version) 6:16

== Personnel ==
Slave

- Danny Webster: lead and rhythm guitar, percussion, lead and backing vocals
- Kevin Johnson: rhythm and lead guitar
- Sam Carter: keyboards, percussion, vocals
- Charles Carter: flute, saxophone, keyboards
- Mark Antone Adams: bass guitar, keyboards, vocals
- Steve Arrington: drums, percussion, vocals
- Roger Parker: drums, percussion
- Delburt Taylor: keyboards, flute, trumpet, flugelhorn, vocals
- Floyd Miller: trumpet, trombone, percussion

Additional musicians

- Fred Zlotkin, Guy Lumia, Harold Kohon, Harry Lookofsky, Jesse Levine, Jonathan Abramowitz, Marilyn Wright, Mitsue Takayama: Strings (charts written and arranged by Mark Adams and Cengiz Yaltkaya; conducted by Cengiz Yaltkaya)

Production

- Produced by Jimmy Douglass
- Recorded and engineered by Ed "The American" Garcis
- Mixed by Jimmy Douglass and Mark Adams
- Mastered by Ted Jensen

== Charts ==
Chart (1981)	Peak position
Billboard Pop Albums	46
Billboard Top Soul Albums	7

=== Singles ===
Year	Single	Chart positions		
Year	Single	Billboard Hot 100	US R&B	US Dance
1981	"Snap Shot"	91	6	21
1981	"Wait for Me"	103	20	21
1981	"Party Lites"	—	—	21
