= Riding High (Faze-O album) =

Studio album by Faze-O
- Released: 1977
- Recorded: 1977
- Studio: Paragon, Chicago, Illinois
- Genre: Funk
- Length: 31:54
- Label: She
- Producer: Tight Corporation

Faze-O chronology
Riding High (1977)	Good Thang (1978)

Professional ratings
Review scores
Source	Rating
AllMusic	4/5 stars

Riding High is the first album by the Dayton, Ohio, funk band Faze-O. Released in 1977 on Atlantic Records subsidiary label, She Records, it was produced by the Ohio Players. They would chart in 1978 with the top ten R&B single, "Riding High".

"Riding High" went on to be an oft-sampled song for many hip hop and R&B acts from the late 1980s onwards. It was first sampled in Fresh Four's "Wishing on a Star" in 1989, produced by the High & Mighty.

== Tracks ==
1. "Riding High" - 5:21
2. "Funky Reputation" - 5:10
3. "You and I (Belong Together)" - 5:20
4. "Toe Jam" - 4:59
5. "True Love" - 3:19
6. "Get Some Booty" - 2:49
7. "Test – This Is Faze-O" - 4:44

== Personnel ==
Faze-O

- Keith Harrison - Arp, Clavinet, composer, Fender Rhodes, keyboards, Minimoog, percussion, piano, electric piano, lead and backing vocals
- Ralph "Love" Aikens - guitar, talk box, lead and backing vocals
- Tyrone "Flye" Crum - bass, backing vocals
- Robert Neal Jr. - percussion, lead and backing vocals
- Roger Parker - drums, percussion

Additional musicians

- Robert "C.D." Jones - congas
- Bobby Lewis, Jack Kramer, Paul Serrano - trumpets

== Charts ==
=== Album ===
Year	Album	Chart positions	
Year	Album	US	US R&B
1978	Riding High	98	19

=== Single ===
Year	Single	Peak chart positions
Year	Single	US R&B
1978	"Riding High"	9
