= Slide (Slave song) =

Single by Slave

from the album Slave
- B-side: "Son of Slide"
- Released: 1977
- Recorded: 1977
- Studio: Century Sound Studios (Sayreville, New Jersey)
- Length: 6:47 (album version); 3:21 (single version)
- Label: Cotillion
- Songwriters: Stephen C. Washington; Mark Hicks; Mark Leslie Adams; Daniel Webster; Tom Dozier; Floyd Miller; Tom Lockett, Jr.; Orion Wilhoite; Carter Bradley
- Producer: Jeff Dixon

Slave singles chronology
"Slide" (1977)	"You and Me" (1997)

"Slide" is a song written, arranged and performed by American R&B/funk band Slave. It was released in 1977 through Cotillion Records as a lead single from their self-titled debut album Slave. Production was handled by Jeff Dixon.

The song peaked at number 32 on the US Billboard Hot 100 and topped the US Hot R&B/Hip-Hop Songs. It also reached number 58 on the Canadian RPM Top 100 Singles chart.

== Track listing ==
No.	Title	Length
1.	"Slide"	3:20

No.	Title	Length
2.	"Son of Slide"	5:29

== Personnel ==
- Stephen C. Washington – songwriter, arrangement
- Mark Hicks – songwriter, arrangement
- Mark Leslie Adams – songwriter, arrangement
- Daniel Webster – songwriter, arrangement
- Tom Dozier – songwriter, arrangement
- Floyd Miller – songwriter, arrangement
- Tom Lockett Jr. – songwriter, arrangement
- Orion Wilhoite – songwriter, arrangement
- Carter Bradley – songwriter, arrangement
- Jeff Dixon – producer

== Charts ==
=== Weekly charts ===
Chart (1977)	Peak position
Canada Top Singles (RPM)	58
US Billboard Hot 100	32
US Hot R&B/Hip-Hop Songs (Billboard)	1

=== Year-end charts ===
Chart (1977)	Position
US Hot R&B/Hip-Hop Songs (Billboard)	10

== In popular culture ==
- The song later appeared on the soundtrack to Marcus Raboy's 2002 Christmas-themed stoner film Friday After Next.
- The song was used in the 8th episode "Nobody Has to Get Hurt" of the second season of American period drama television series The Deuce.

== Samples ==
The song has been sampled in A Tribe Called Quest's "Go Ahead in the Rain" from their debut album and in Travis Scott's "Flying High" from his 2015 album Rodeo.

== See also ==
- List of Hot Soul Singles number ones of 1977
