= Dancin' in the Key of Life =

Studio album by Steve Arrington
- Released: 1985
- Studios: Dawnbreaker Studios (San Fernando, CA); Devonshire Sound Studios (North Hollywood, CA)
- Genre: Soul
- Length: 41:40
- Label: Atlantic
- Producers: Keg Johnson; Wilmer Raglin

Steve Arrington chronology
Dancin' in the Key of Life (1985)	The Jammin' National Anthem (1986)

Singles from Dancin' in the Key of Life
- 1. "Feel So Real" Released: 1985; 2. "Dancin' in the Key of Life" Released: 1985; 3. "Turn Up the Love" Released: 1985; 4. "She Just Don't Know" Released: 1985

Professional ratings
Review scores
Source	Rating
AllMusic	4.5/5 stars
Christgau's Record Guide	A−
The Rolling Stone Album Guide	4/5 stars

Dancin' in the Key of Life is the debut solo studio album (not including the two albums released earlier in the decade with Steve Arrington's Hall of Fame) by American R&B/soul singer Steve Arrington. It was released in 1985 via Atlantic Records, and was produced by Keg Johnson and Wilmer Raglin. The album peaked at number 185 on the Billboard 200 and number 32 on the Top R&B/Hip-Hop Albums chart. Its self-titled lead single peaked at No. 68 on the Hot 100 and No. 8 on the Hot R&B/Hip-Hop Songs chart.

== Track listing ==
No.	Title	Writer(s)	Length
1.	"Feel So Real"	India Arrington; Steve Arrington	5:06
2.	"Dancin' in the Key of Life"	India Arrington; Steve Arrington	4:57
3.	"She Just Don't Know"	Michael Terry	5:17
4.	"Willie Mae"	India Arrington; Steve Arrington	5:59
5.	"Gasoline"	Dan Johnson; Michael Terry	6:11
6.	"Stand with Me"	Gary Johnson; India Arrington; Steve Arrington	4:45
7.	"Brown Baby Boy"	India Arrington; Steve Arrington	4:50
8.	"Turn Up the Love"	George Johnson; India Arrington; Steve Arrington	4:35
Total length:			41:40

== 2022 CD reissue bonus tracks ==
No.	Title	Writer(s)	Length
9.	"Feel So Real (vocal/extended version)"	India Arrington; Steve Arrington	6:54
10.	"Feel So Real (instrumental/extended version)"	India Arrington; Steve Arrington	5:37
11.	"Dancin' in the Key of Life (vocal/special remix)"	India Arrington; Steve Arrington	6:06
12.	"Dancin' in the Key of Life (remix version)"	India Arrington; Steve Arrington	7:14
13.	"Dancin' in the Key of Life (the megamix)"		10:27

== Personnel ==
- Steve Arrington: Main Vocal, Vocal Backing, Keyboards
- India Arrington, Dani Johnson, Marti McCall, Pattie Brooks, Michael Terry, Wilmer Raglin: Vocal Backing
- George Johnson: Guitars and Electric Bass
- Eric Williams: Guitars
- Anthony Johnson, Carlos Murguia, William F. Zimmerman, Joey Gallo, Ramsey Embick: Keyboards
- Paulinho Da Costa: Percussion
- Freddie Hubbard: Trumpet
- Stella Castellucci: Harp

== Charts ==
Chart	Peak position
German Albums (Offizielle Top 100)	65
UK Albums (Official Charts)	41
US Billboard 200	185
US Top R&B/Hip-Hop Albums (Billboard)	32
