= William Bell (singer) =

American soul singer and songwriter (born 1939)

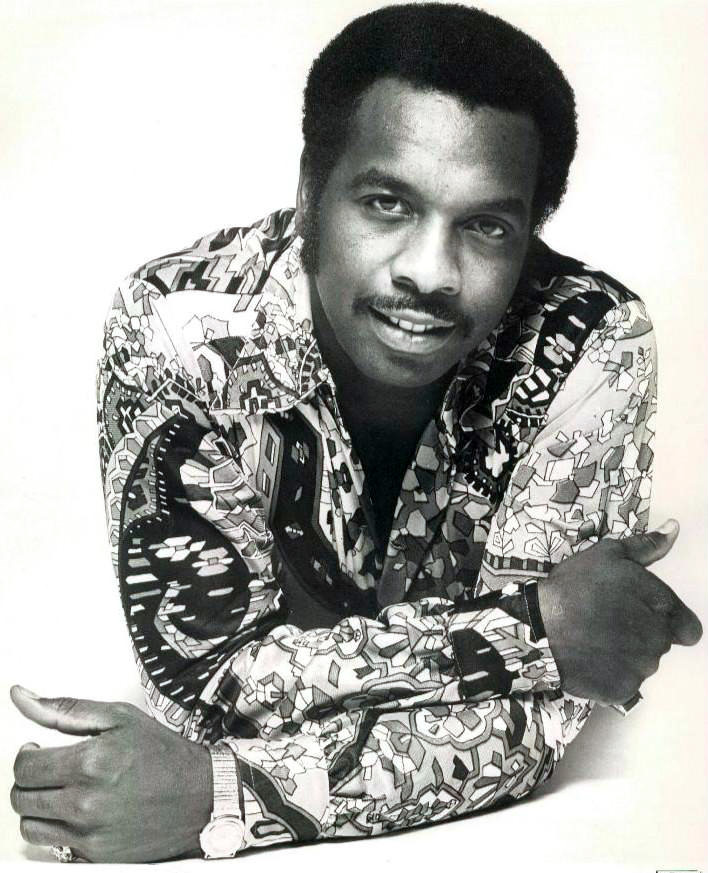
- Bell in 1971

Background information
- Born: William Yarbrough; July 16, 1939 (age 87); Memphis, Tennessee, U.S.
- Genres: R&B, soul
- Occupations: Singer, songwriter
- Instrument: Vocals
- Years active: 1957–present
- Labels: Stax Records, Wilbe Records
- Website: http://www.williambell.com/

William Bell (né Yarbrough; born July 16, 1939) is an American soul singer and songwriter. As a performer, he is best known for his debut single, 1961's "You Don't Miss Your Water"; 1968's top 10 hit in the UK "Private Number", a duet with Judy Clay; and his only US top 40 hit, 1976's "Tryin' to Love Two", which also hit No. 1 on the R&B chart. Upon the death of Otis Redding, Bell released the well-received memorial song "A Tribute to a King".

As a songwriter, Bell co-authored the Chuck Jackson hit "Any Other Way" (which was a cover since Bell issued it first) as a follow-up to "You Don't Miss Your Water"; Billy Idol's 1986 hit "To Be a Lover", which was first a hit for Bell under its original title "I Forgot to Be Your Lover"; and the blues classic "Born Under A Bad Sign", popularized by both Albert King and Cream.

Although he was a longtime recording artist for Stax Records, he is unrelated to the label's onetime president, Al Bell.

In 2017, Bell was awarded a Grammy for Best Americana Album for his record This Is Where I Live. He performed his hit "Born Under a Bad Sign" alongside Gary Clark Jr. at the 2017 Grammy Awards. Bell was also featured on Rolling Stone's "Best of the Grammys" for that year.

== Career ==
Bell was born in Memphis, Tennessee. He took the last name "Bell" as a stage name in honor of his grandmother, whose first name was Belle.

Bell sang in church as a child and considered himself a student of The Soul Stirrers, the popular gospel group led by Sam Cooke. At age ten, he began songwriting with the original composition "Alone on a Rainy Night". At the age of 14, Bell won a talent contest and began making a name for himself singing in Memphis-area clubs.

He made his first leap into the music scene backing Rufus Thomas. In 1957, Bell recorded his first sides as a member of the Del Rios, a teenage vocal group that caught the eye of Stax Records.

Bell was an early signing on Stax Records initially as a songwriter. Other notable Stax Records artists include Otis Redding, Sam and Dave, Isaac Hayes, and The Staple Singers.

Bell was the first male solo act to be signed to Stax Records and he was able to release several singles before joining the military. He continued to record singles while on break from deployment, including the song "Marching Off to War". It was only after Bell finished his stint in the military that he was finally able to release his debut album, 1967's The Soul of a Bell, on Stax Records. Bell's top 20 single "Everybody Loves a Winner" was on this album.

Bell was a close friend of fellow Stax recording artist Otis Redding. Bell was supposed to be on the same tragic 1967 flight that led to Redding's death. "It started snowing so bad in Chicago, the promoter up there canceled my show", recalled Bell. The tragedy led to a collaboration between Bell and Booker T. Jones (of Booker T. & the M.G.'s) who Bell knew from high school and church. Bell and Jones released "A Tribute to a King" in honor of Redding and it quickly became a hit.

In 1967, Bell co-wrote an unintended Christmas hit, "Everyday Will Be Like a Holiday". The song remains one of Bell's most-recorded hits and serves as a classic R&B Christmas song. In 2017, Hot Press magazine named the hit the "Greatest Christmas record of all time".

Bell moved to Atlanta, Georgia, in 1969 and started Peachtree Record Company, his short-lived soul label.

During his time in Atlanta, he took acting lessons and played Stanley Kowalski in a production of A Streetcar Named Desire. Bell later signed a two-year deal with Mercury Records, where he released his biggest hit, the 1977 single "Trying to Love Two", which hit No. 1 on the R&B chart and No. 10 on the pop chart, and sold a million copies.

In 1985, he founded another label, Wilbe, and issued Passion, which found its most receptive audiences in the UK.

Two years later, Bell was inducted into the Georgia Music Hall of Fame and received the Rhythm & Blues Foundation's R&B Pioneer Award that same year. Starting in 1992, Bell took a hiatus from the recording studio, while still performing regularly. In 2000, he released an album of all-new material on Wilbe entitled A Portrait Is Forever. In 2003, he was honored with the W.C. Handy Heritage Award. It wasn't until six years after his previous album that he released the album New Lease on Life.

=== 2010s to present ===
In 2016, Bell reactivated the Stax Records label to release a new album. Produced by John Leventhal, This Is Where I Live featured Bell performing a batch of new songs, along with a revived recording of "Born Under a Bad Sign". In 2017, the album was awarded a Grammy for Best Americana Album, which took Bell's career to new heights including a featured performance alongside other Stax acts at BBC's 50 Years of Soul event at Royal Albert Hall in London, UK. Additionally, Bell was one of the final performances at B. B. King's Blues Club in New York before it closed in the spring of 2018.

Bell was featured in the 2014 documentary film Take Me to the River that explored the heart of the enduring Memphis music scene. He was featured alongside other artists including Bobby Bland, Mavis Staples, and Snoop Dogg. Bell is currently involved in the sequel to the popular documentary, and he calls it "a powerful little film".

In 2016, Bell recorded This Is Where I Live, his first major label album in over 30 years. Bell was awarded a Grammy for Best Americana Album in 2017, which, in turn, had such a strong effect on his streaming data that Rolling Stone called him "the biggest winner of the night". His song "You Don't Miss Your Water" is featured in the trailer and the first episode of the Cinemax TV series Quarry, which debuted in 2016.

On September 1, 2017, age 78, Bell performed live at the Royal Albert Hall BBC Proms with Jools Holland and his Rhythm & Blues Orchestra in a tribute concert to 50 years of Stax Records synonymous with Southern Soul music. Bell spent time in 2017 and 2018 touring with a group of featured artists from Take Me to the River. The touring group was named one of the "10 Bands to See This Year" by Parade magazine. In 2017, Bell performed twice on NPR Music's Tiny Desk Concerts. He performed with his own band and again with the touring Take Me to the River group.

Bell released the single "In a Moment of Weakness" in 2018 as part of the Amazon Original Produced By series. His song was produced by the Grammy Award-winning Matt Ross-Spang. Bell performed at the Mempho Music Festival in Memphis, Tennessee on October 6, 2018, as part of a tribute set dedicated to Royal Studios. In 2019, Bell collaborated with Southern Avenue on their single "We've Got the Music".

Bell performed at the 2019 Blues Music Awards, where he was nominated for Best Soul Blues Male Artist.

Eric Clapton released a video for his 2018 cover of Bell's holiday song "Everyday Will Be Like a Holiday". Bell joined several other soul legends for B. B. King's tribute concert at the Capitol Theatre on February 16, 2020. A few months later, the National Endowment for the Arts named Bell one of their 2020 fellows, the "nation's highest honor in the folk and traditional arts. These lifetime honor awards of $25,000 are given in recognition of both artistic excellence and efforts to sustain cultural traditions for future generations."

In mid-2023, Bell released One Day Closer to Home on his own Wilbe Records label, cited by critics as "a master at work".

In 2024, the Recording Academy announced that Bell's 1961 hit single "You Don't Miss Your Water" would be inducted into the Grammy Hall of Fame, which recognizes recordings that "exhibit qualitative or historical significance".

== Covered by ==
- Linda Ronstadt covered "Everybody Loves a Winner" on her 1973 album Don't Cry Now.
- Homer Simpson of The Simpsons sang "Born Under a Bad Sign" on the 1990 album The Simpsons Sing the Blues.
- Cream covered "Born Under a Bad Sign" on their 1968 album Wheels of Fire.
- Jimi Hendrix covered "Born Under a Bad Sign" on his album Blues, released posthumously in 1994.
- Etta James covered "Born Under a Bad Sign" on her album Life, Love, and the Blues released in 1998.
- 911 covered "Private Number" for their 1999 album There It Is.
- Warren Haynes covered "Every Day Will Be Like a Holiday" on his 2011 album Man in Motion.
- Carole King covered "Every Day Will Be Like a Holiday" on her 2011 album A Holiday Carole.
- Hall & Oates covered "Every Day Will Be Like a Holiday" on their 2006 album Home for Christmas.
- The Byrds covered "You Don't Miss Your Water" on their 1968 album Sweetheart of the Rodeo.
- The Revelations and Tre Williams covered "I Forgot to Be Your Lover" on the 2012 soundtrack of the film The Man with the Iron Fists.
- Robert Cray covered "I Forgot to Be Your Lover" on his 2005 album Twenty.
- Melissa Etheridge covered "I Forgot to Be Your Lover", "Any Other Way", and "Born Under a Bad Sign" on her 2016 album Memphis Rock and Soul.
- Brian Eno covered "You Don't Miss Your Water" on the soundtrack to the Jonathan Demme film Married to the Mob.
- Bruce Springsteen covered "I Forgot to Be Your Lover" and "Any Other Way" on his 2022 album Only the Strong Survive.
- Delbert & Glen covered "Every Day Will Be Like a Holiday" on their 1972 album Delbert & Glen
- The Black Keys covered "I Forgot to Be Your Lover" on their 2024 album Ohio Players.

== Awards and honors ==
- W.C. Handy Heritage Award from the Memphis Music Foundation (2003)
- BMI Songwriters Award (2003)
- Featured in the Stax Museum of American Soul Music (2003)
- Lifetime Achievement Award from Americana Music Association (2016)
- Memphis Music Hall of Fame inductee (2016)
- Grammy Award win: Best Americana Album for This Is Where I Live (2017)
- Grammy Award nomination: Best Traditional R&B Performance for "The Three of Me" (2017)
- Four Blues Music Award nominations: Album (This Is Where I Live), Soul Blues Album (This Is Where I Live), Soul Blues Male Artist (2017) (The Blues Foundation, 2018), Best Soul Blues Male Artist (2019)
- Epitome of Soul Award presented to Bell by Stevie Wonder at The Consortium MMT event at the Horseshoe Tunica (2017)
- National Heritage Fellowship awarded by the National Endowment for the Arts (2020)

== Notable performances ==
- Smithsonian Folklife Festival in Washington, D.C. (2011)
- Memphis Symphony Orchestra (2012)
- "You Don't Miss Your Water" at the White House for "In Performance at the White House: Memphis Soul" (2013)
- Billboard Live in Tokyo (2015)
- Music Hall of Fame induction ceremony alongside Justin Timberlake (2015)
- The Cutting Room and MetroTech Commons as part of the Brooklyn Academy of Music's Rhythm and Blues Festival Series (2016)
- Royal Albert Hall in London (2017)
- "Born Under a Bad Sign" with guitarist Gary Clark Jr. at the Grammy Awards (2017)
- Dakota Jazz Club in Minneapolis, Minnesota (2018)
- Bayfront Blues Festival in Duluth, Minnesota (2018)
- Mempho Music Festival in Memphis, Tennessee (2018)
- Blues Music Awards (2019)

== Discography ==
=== Studio albums ===
Year	Album	Peak chart positions		Label
Year	Album	US	US R&B	Label
1967	The Soul of a Bell	—	—	Stax 719
1969	Bound to Happen	—	49	Stax 2014
1971	Wow ...William Bell	—	—	Stax 2037
1972	Phases of Reality	—	—	Stax 3005
1973	Waiting for William Bell	—	—	Stax 3012
1974	Relating	—	—	Stax 5502
1977	Coming Back for More	63	15	Mercury
1977	It's Time You Took Another Listen	—	—	Mercury
1983	Survivor	—	—	Kat Family
1985	Passion	—	39	Wilbe
1989	On a Roll	—	—	Wilbe
1992	Bedtime Stories	—	96	Wilbe
1999	A Portrait Is Forever	—	—	Wilbe
2006	New Lease on Life	—	—	Wilbe
2016	This Is Where I Live	—	—	Stax
2023	One Day Closer to Home	—	—	Wilbe Records
"—" denotes releases that did not chart.

=== Compilation albums ===
- The Best of William Bell (1988)
- The Very Best of William Bell (2007)

=== Singles ===
Year	Label & Cat No	Title	Peak chart positions		
Year	Label & Cat No	Title	US Hot 100	US R&B	UK
1961	Stax 116	"You Don't Miss Your Water"	95	—	—
1962	Stax 128	"Any Other Way"	131	—	—
1963	Stax 132	"I Told You So"	—	—	—
1963	Stax 135	"Just as I Thought"	—	—	—
1963	Stax 138	"Somebody Mentioned Your Name"	—	—	—
1963	Stax 141	"I'll Show You"	—	—	—
1964	Stax 146	"Who Will It Be Tomorrow"	—	—	—
1965	Stax 174	"Crying All by Myself"	—	—	—
1966	Stax 191	"Share What You Got (But Keep What You Need)"	—	27	—
1966	Stax 199	"Never Like This Before"	—	29	—
1967	Stax 212	"Everybody Loves a Winner"	95	18	—
1967	Stax 227	"Eloise (Hang on in There)"	—	—	—
1967	Stax 237	"Everyday Will Be Like a Holiday"	—	33	—
1968	Stax 248	"Every Man Ought to Have a Woman" (A-Side)	115	—	—
1968	Stax 248	"A Tribute to a King" (B-Side)	86	16	31
1968	Stax 0005	"Private Number" (with Judy Clay)	75	17	8
1968	Stax 0015	"I Forgot to Be Your Lover"	45	10	—
1968	Stax 0017	"My Baby Specializes" (with Judy Clay)	104	45	—
1969	Stax 0032	"My Whole World Is Falling Down"	—	39	—
1969	Stax 0038	"Happy"	129	—	—
1969	Stax 0040	"Soul-A-Lujah" (with Johnnie Taylor, Eddie Floyd, Pervis Staples, Carla Thomas, Mavis Staples and Cleotha Staples)	—	—	—
1969	Stax 0043	"Love's Sweet Sensation" (with Mavis Staples)	—	—	—
1969	Stax 0044	"I Can't Stop" (with Carla Thomas)	106	—	—
1969	Stax 0054	"Born Under a Bad Sign"	—	—	—
1970	Stax 0067	"All I Have to Do Is Dream" (with Carla Thomas)	—	—	—
1970	Stax 0070	"Lonely Soldier"	—	—	—
1971	Stax 0092	"A Penny for Your Thoughts"	—	—	—
1971	Stax 0106	"All for the Love of a Woman"	—	—	—
1972	Stax 0128	"Save Us"	—	—	—
1973	Stax 0157	"Lovin' on Borrowed Time"	101	22	—
1973	Stax 0175	"I've Got to Go on Without You"	—	54	—
1974	Stax 0198	"Gettin' What You Want (Losin' What You Got)"	—	39	—
1974	Stax 0221	"Get It While It's Hot"	—	—	—
1976	Mercury 73829	"Tryin' to Love Two"	10	1	—
1977	Mercury 73922	"Coming Back for More"	—	66	—
1977	Mercury 73961	"Easy Comin' Out (Hard Goin' In)"	—	30	—
1983	Kat Family 03502	"Bad Time to Break Up"	—	65	—
1983	Kat Family 03995	"Playing Hard to Get"	—	—	—
1985	Wilbe 201	"Lovin' on Borrowed Time" (new version)	—	—	—
1986	Wilbe 202	"I Don't Want to Wake Up (Feelin' Guilty)" (with Janice Bulluck)	—	59	—
1986	Wilbe 204	"Headline News"	—	65	70
1986		"Passion"	—	—	96
1986	Wilbe 205	"Please Come Home for Christmas"	—	—	—
1989	Wilbe 508	"Getting Out of Your Bed"	—	—	—
1990	Wilbe 515	"Need Your Love So Bad"	—	—	—
1992	Wilbe 619	"Bedtime Story"	—	—	—
1995	Wilbe 624	"Shake Hands (Come Out Lovin')"	—	—	—
"—" denotes releases that did not chart or were not released in that territory.
