= Tryin' to Love Two =

Single by William Bell

from the album Coming Back for More
- B-side: "If Sex Was All We Had"
- Released: November 1976
- Genre: R&B, disco
- Length: 3:28
- Label: Mercury
- Songwriter(s): William Bell and Paul Mitchell
- Producer(s): William Bell and Paul Mitchell

William Bell singles chronology
| "Get It While It's Hot" (1974) | "Tryin' to Love Two" (1976) | "Coming Back for More" (1977) |

"Tryin' to Love Two" was a hit song by R&B singer William Bell in 1977. Released from his album, Coming Back for More, it would become his biggest hit, reaching number one on the R&B charts and crossing over to the pop charts, reaching number ten on the Billboard Hot 100. It would eventually sell over a million singles. The single was written and produced by William Bell and Paul Mitchell and was the first song recorded by Bell after a three-year hiatus from recording.
