= Olde English 800 =

Brand of malt liquor

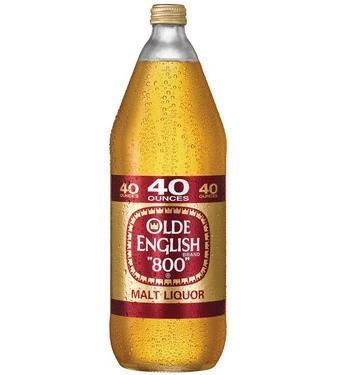
- Olde English 800, 40 oz
- Manufacturer: Miller Brewing Company (since 1999)
- Introduced: 1964
- Alcohol by volume: 5.9-8.0
- Style: Malt Liquor

Olde English 800 is a brand of American malt liquor brewed by the Miller Brewing Company. Introduced in 1964, it has been produced by the company since 1999. It is available in a variety of serving sizes including (since the late 1980s) a 40-U.S.-fluid-ounce (1,200-milliliter) bottle.

== History ==
=== Introduction ===
Olde English 800, also known as 8 ball or Old E (O' E or Ol' E in some colloquial dialects), was introduced in 1964. It had its origins in the late 1940s as Ruff's Olde English Stout, brewed by Peoples Brewing Company of Duluth, Minnesota. Rebranded Olde English 600, it was later sold to Bohemian Breweries of Spokane, Washington, and then to Blitz-Weinhard of Portland, Oregon, where it became Olde English 800. By the time Blitz-Weinhard was sold to the Pabst Brewing Company in 1979, Olde English Malt Liquor had become their top brand.

=== 1980s ===
Michael Hagan's idea of a good time is to guzzle a few bottles of Olde English "800" Malt Liquor and smoke PCP with his fellow gang members in the slums of south central Los Angeles. There is no telling what might happen. - The first line of an August 1987 Time magazine story called "Life And Death With the Gangs"

In August 1989, when the brand was owned by Pabst and targeted by the brewer towards the "urban contemporary market", a coalition of "22 public interest groups involved in minority issues" criticized the marketing of Olde English which as a malt liquor has a higher alcohol content than most beers﹘ on what they characterized as an "emphasis on Black and Hispanic consumers."

=== 1990s ===
In 1991, 1992, 1994, and 1995, while still owned by Pabst, Olde English was awarded a gold medal in the American Malt Liquor category at the Great American Beer Festival. In 1992, Pabst introduced Old English 800 Draft, a cold-filtered instead of pasteurized "draft-style" malt liquor. Olde English received the gold medal in the American Style Specialty Lager category in 1997. The 1999 acquisition of Olde English 800 by Miller meant its share of the U.S. malt liquor business grew to 36 percent; it also led to a "less controversial" marketing strategy for the brand, one that by 2000 included the sponsorship of a series of minority business seminars.

=== 2000s–2010s ===
In 2010, the 3.2% ABV version of Olde English was rated one of "the worst beer[s] in the world" by RateBeer.com, a beer rating website.

=== 2020s ===
In 2021 Olde English HG 800, the classic 8% malt liquor in a 40oz glass bottle, was discontinued. It wasn't fully gone from shelves until early/mid 2023 in Western Canada.

== Alcohol content ==
As of 2010, Olde English 800 is brewed in several versions which vary in alcohol by volume (ABV):

Brand	Region	ABV
Olde English 800	East Coast to Midwest (USA)	5.9%, 7.7%
Olde English 800	Texas (USA)	3.2% ABW (≅ 4.2% ABV)
Olde English 800 7.5%	West Coast (USA)	7.5%
Olde English High Gravity 800	USA	8.0%
Olde English 800	European Union	6.1% ABV
Olde English 800	Canada	8.0%

Olde English 800 was originally available in 12-ounce (355 ml) or 32-ounce (947 ml) "King Size" cans (c. 1999), and 22-, 45-, or 64-ounce glass bottles. It is currently available in a

- 16-ounce (473 ml) pint can,
- 22-ounce (651 ml) glass bottle,
- 24-ounce (710 ml) "tallboy" can,
- 40-ounce (1.18 liter) or 42-ounce (1.24 liter) plastic bottle, or
- 40-ounce glass bottle.
