= Aurra =

American soul musical group

- Also known as: Déjà (post–1984)
- Origin: Dayton, Ohio, United States
- Genres: Funk, soul, rhythm & blues, dance, post-disco
- Years active: 1979–1983 (as Aurra); 1984–1990 (as Déja)
- Labels: Salsoul; Next Plateau; 10 Records (UK); Virgin (US); Family Groove Records
- Past members: Aurra: Starleana Young; Curt Jones; Steve Washington; Thomas Lockett, Jr. Charles "Cedell" Carter; Waung "Buddy" Hankerson; Raymond "Rajac" Jackson; Philip Field; Kevin "Ignatz" Moore; A.C. Drummer; Jimi Randolph; Gail Freeman; Kevin Grady; Sheila Washington; Kevin Caldwell; Mark Stevens; Déjà: Starleana Young; Curt Jones; Mysti Day

Aurra was an American 1980s soul group, which, at the time of its biggest success on Salsoul Records, featured Curt Jones (guitar/vocals) and Starleana Young (vocals) and included Steve Washington (bass/guitar/drums), Philip Field (keyboards/synthesizers/vocals) and Tom Lockett (saxophone/percussion).

== History ==
Aurra started off in 1979 as an offshoot of the funk band Slave. Steve Washington first conceptualized the project, which also initially featured fellow former Slave members Curt Jones, Starleana Young, and Thomas Lockett. By the time they recorded their first LP, the lineup also included Charles Carter and Buddy Hankerson. Aurra initially signed with Dream Records, and then Salsoul Records. Composer/keyboardist Philip Field, known for his work as a member of Mtume, subsequently joined the lineup.

During the early 1980s, the group found success with hits such as "Are You Single" (number 16 on the US Billboard Hot R&B/Hip-Hop Songs chart), "Checkin' You Out", and "Make Up Your Mind", the last of which became the group's biggest US hit under the Aurra moniker - reaching number six on the R&B chart and number 71 on the pop chart. The group continued to release albums up through the 1985 release Like I Like It; this album was released as Bedtime Story in the U.S. that same year. A revamped version of Like I Like It, featuring an updated cover, was released in Europe in 1986 to include the new single, "You and Me Tonight", along with remixed versions of other tracks from the original album. "You and Me Tonight" reached number 12 on the UK singles chart that year.

By the time Like I Like It was re-released, several group members were at odds with Steve Washington. Legal issues with Washington over the name Aurra led to the duo of principal members Jones and Young breaking away and beginning to record under the name Déjà. In 1987, they released their Virgin Records debut as Déjà, Serious, which was produced in large part by the Time member Monte Moir. Featured on this album was "You and Me Tonight", from the group's Aurra days, introducing American audiences to the song for the first time. "You and Me Tonight" charted in the upper reaches of the US Billboard R&B chart (peaking at number two) and crossed over onto the pop charts, where it peaked at number 54, making it the highest-charting single from any Aurra-associated group. Meanwhile, Starleana Young decided to leave to pursue a solo career and was replaced by Mysti Day in time to record Déjà's follow-up album. The resulting album, Made to Be Together was released in 1989, with the Teddy Riley-produced title track becoming a minor R&B hit.

In 2013, Family Groove Records recovered the lost tapes for the unreleased 'fifth' Aurra album Satisfaction, originally recorded in 1984. The direction of the album was supervised by Steve Washington, Amuka Kelly (also known as Sheila Horne Washington), and Daniel Borine. In 2015 Family Groove Records released the Body Rock album.

In 2019, Aurra's second album as Déjà, the long out of print Made to Be Together was released to digital and streaming platforms.

On February 1, 2026, it was announced that Steve Washington has died. He was 67.

== Discography ==
=== as Aurra ===
==== Albums ====
Year	Album	Label	Peak chart positions	
Year	Album	Label	US	US R&B
1980	Aurra	Dream Records	128	16
1981	Send Your Love	Salsoul Records	103	22
1982	A Little Love	Salsoul Records	38	12
1983	Live and Let Live	Salsoul Records	—	36
1985	Like I Like It (Released in the US as Bedtime Story)	10 Records (UK), Next Plateau Records (US)	—	—
2013	Satisfaction	Family Groove Records	—	—
2015	Body Rock	Family Groove Records	—	—
"—" denotes releases that did not chart or were not released in that territory.

==== Singles ====
Year	Single	Peak chart positions			
Year	Single	US Dance	US R&B	US Pop	UK
1980	"When I Come Home"	50	—	―	—
1980	"In the Mood (to Groove)" / "You're the Only One"	50	86	―	―
1981	"Are You Single"	36	16	―	—
1981	"Make Up Your Mind"	35	6	71	―
1981	"Keep Doin' It" / "Nasty Disposition"	27	36	—	—
1982	"Checking You Out" / "A Little Love"	47	64	―	—
1982	"In My Arms"	—	—	―	—
1982	"Such a Feeling"	29	40	—	―
1982	"It's You"	—	—	—	―
1983	"Baby Love"	―	78	―	―
1985	"Happy Feeling"	―	―	―	85
1985	"Like I Like It"	―	―	―	43
1986	"You and Me Tonight"	—	—	—	12
1986	"Are You Available"	―	―	―	—
2013	"Perfect Date"	―	―	―	—
2013	"Something Tells Me"	―	―	―	—
2013	"Satisfaction"	—	—	―	—
2013	"Back 2 U" (featuring Curt Jones)	―	—	—	―
2015	"Are You Foolin' Around"	―	—	—	―
2015	"I'll Let You Go"	―	—	—	―
2015	"Conversation" / "What Can You Do for Me"	―	—	—	―
"—" denotes releases that did not chart or were not released in that territory.

==== Compilation albums ====
- 1991: The Best of Aurra (Rams Horn Records)
- 1996: Anthology (CNR Music)
- 1999: Greatest Hits (Unidisc Music)

=== as Déjà ===
==== Albums ====
Year	Album	Label	Peak chart positions	
Year	Album	Label	US	US R&B
1987	Serious	Virgin / 10 Records	186	27
1989	Made to Be Together	Virgin / 10 Records	—	96
"—" denotes releases that did not chart.

==== Singles ====
Year	Single	Label	Peak chart positions			
Year	Single	Label	US Dance	US R&B	US Pop	UK
1987	"Serious"	10 Records	—	—	—	75
1987	"You and Me Tonight" (re-release)	Virgin	20	2	54	—
1987	"That's Where You'll Find Me"	10 Records	—	17	—	—
1988	"Going Crazy"	Virgin	—	57	—	—
1988	"Made to Be Together"	Virgin	—	23	—	—
1988	"Heart Beat"	Virgin	—	—	—	—
"—" denotes releases that did not chart or were not released in that territory.

==== Compilation albums ====
- 2003: Aurra / Déjà - Deja: Definitive Collection of Aurra - Salsoul & Virgin Years

== See also ==
- Skyy (band)
- Slave (band)
- Salsoul Records
