= Slave (band) =

American band

- Origin: Dayton, Ohio, United States
- Genres: Funk, R&B, soul, boogie, disco
- Years active: 1975–1996
- Labels: Cotillion, Atco, Ichiban
- Past members: Tom Lockett; Carter Bradley; Mark Adams; Mark Hicks; Danny Webster; Orion Wilhoite; Tim Dozier; Floyd Miller; Steve Arrington; Steve Washington; Starleana Young; Curt Jones; Ray Turner

Slave was an American Ohio-based funk band popular in the late 1970s and early 1980s. Trumpeter and multi-instrumentalist Steve Washington, born in New Jersey, attended East Orange High School, and was one of the first users of the "electric trumpet". He and Trombonist Floyd Miller formed the group in Dayton, Ohio, in 1975.

== History ==
During late 1975 and spring of 1976, trombonist Floyd Miller teamed with trumpeter Steve Washington to form Slave. The original line-up included Tom Lockett Jr. (tenor and alto sax), Carter Bradley (keyboards), Mark Adams (bass), Mark "Drac" Hicks (lead and rhythm guitar, background vocals), Danny Webster (rhythm and lead guitar, lead and background vocals), Orion "Bimmy" Wilhoite (alto and tenor sax), and Tim "Tiny" Dozier (drums). They scored their first big hit with the single "Slide" in 1977 for Cotillion Records, which is the label they remained with until 1984. In 1978, Slave's sound changed slightly when drummer/percussionist Steve Arrington, along with vocalists Starleana Young, Curt Jones, and keyboardist Ray Turner joined the band. Arrington ultimately replaced Miller and Webster as lead vocalist.

Other top ten R&B hits were "Just a Touch of Love" in 1979, "Watching You" in 1980, and "Snap Shot" in 1981. They added Charles Carter on sax and brother Sam Carter on keyboards. Starleana Young, Steve Washington, Curt Jones and Lockett departed to form Aurra in 1981. Slave added Roger Parker, Delbert Taylor Jr., and Kevin Johnson as replacements. Arrington left in 1982 after the Showtime album to start his own band Steve Arrington's Hall of Fame in which Charles and Sam Carter would also play. The band continued on, though not as successfully, into the mid-1990s.

The group moved to Atlantic Records for one LP (New Plateau) in 1984, then switched to the Atlanta-based Ichiban Records the following year, releasing Unchained at Last in late 1985. Despite scoring a couple of minor hits on the R&B chart from this album the following year and another minor hit from their 1987 follow-up album, Make Believe, Slave could not recapture the commercial success they had enjoyed in their heyday. Rhino issued Stellar Fungk: The Best of Slave Featuring Steve Arrington, an anthology of their finest cuts, in 1994.

=== Deaths ===
- Bass player Mark Leslie Adams Sr., a native of Dayton, died on March 5, 2011, at age 50 in Columbus, Ohio.
- Guitar player Mark ("Drac") Hicks, a native of Dayton, died on June 14, 2011, at the age of 52 in Dayton, Ohio.
- Saxophone player Orion Wilhoite, a native of Dayton, died on March 7, 2020, at the age of 63 in Dayton, Ohio.
- Singer and guitarist Danny Webster, a native of Dayton, died on September 10, 2020, at the age of 61 in Dayton, Ohio.
- Keyboardist Carter Bradley, a native of Dayton, died February 21, 2023, at the age of 73.
- Drummer Roger Parker, a native of Dayton, died March 5, 2023, at the age of 67 in Dayton, Ohio
- On February 1, 2026, it was announced that trumpeter Steve Washington died. He was 67.

== Discography ==
=== Studio albums ===
Year	Album	Peak chart positions			Certifications	Record label
Year	Album	US	US R&B	CAN	Certifications	Record label
1977	Slave	22	6	—	RIAA: Gold	Cotillion
1977	The Hardness of the World	67	31	—		Cotillion
1978	The Concept	78	11	95		Cotillion
1979	Just a Touch of Love	92	11	—		Cotillion
1980	Stone Jam	53	5	—	RIAA: Gold	Cotillion
1981	Show Time	46	7	—		Cotillion
1982	Visions of the Lite	177	46	—		Cotillion
1983	Bad Enuff	168	30	—		Cotillion
1984	New Plateau	—	79	—		Cotillion
1985	Unchained at Last	—	56	—		Ichiban
1987	Make Believe	—	44	—		Ichiban
1988	88	—	—	—		Ichiban
1990	Rebirth	—	—	—		Ichiban
1992	The Funk Strikes Back	—	—	—		Ichiban
1995	Masters of the Fungk	—	—	—		Ichiban
"—" denotes releases that did not chart or was not released in that territory.

=== Compilation albums ===
Year	Album	Peak	Record label
Year	Album	US R&B	Record label
1984	Best of Slave	—	Cotillion
1994	Stellar Fungk: The Best of Slave	44	Rhino
1997	Slide and Other Hits	—	Rhino
1998	From the Archives	—	T.F.L.
2001	Greatest Hits	—	Goldenlane
2003	Party Lights: More of the Best	—	Rhino
2006	The Definitive Groove Collection	—	Rhino
"—" denotes releases that did not chart.

=== Singles ===
Year	Single	Peak chart Positions					Album
Year	Single	US	US R&B	US Dan	CAN	UK	Album
1977	"Slide"	32	1	—	58	—	Slave
1978	"The Party Song"	110	22	—	—	—	The Hardness of the World
1978	"Baby Sinister"	—	74	—	—	—	The Hardness of the World
1978	"Stellar Fungk"	—	14	—	—	—	The Concept
1978	"Just Freak"	110	64	—	—	—	The Concept
1979	"Just a Touch of Love"	—	9	26	—	64	Just a Touch of Love
1980	"Foxy Lady (Funky Lady)"	—	55	—	—	—	Just a Touch of Love
1980	"Sizzlin' Hot"	—	57	—	—	—	Stone Jam
1980	"Watching You"	78	6	23	—	—	Stone Jam
1981	"Feel My Love"	—	62	23	—	—	Stone Jam
1981	"Snap Shot"	91	6	21	—	—	Show Time
1981	"Party Lites"	—	—	21	—	—	Show Time
1981	"Wait for Me"	103	20	21	—	—	Show Time
1982	"Intro (Come to Blow Ya Mind)"	—	81	—	—	—	Visions of the Lite
1983	"Do You Like It... (Girl)"	—	73	—	—	—	Visions of the Lite
1983	"Be My Babe"	—	—	—	—	—	Visions of the Lite
1983	"Shake It Up"	—	22	—	—	—	Bad Enuff
1983	"Steppin' Out"	—	73	—	—	—	Bad Enuff
1984	"Ooohh"	—	41	—	—	—	New Plateau
1984	"The Word Is Out"	—	—	—	—	—	New Plateau
1986	"Jazzy Lady"	—	—	—	—	—	Unchained at Last
1986	"Thrill Me"	—	84	—	—	—	Unchained at Last
1986	"All We Need Is Time"	—	85	—	—	—	Unchained at Last
1987	"Juicy-O"	—	83	—	—	—	Make Believe
1987	"I Like Your Style"	—	—	—	—	—	Make Believe
"—" denotes releases that did not chart or was not released in that territory.
