= Steve Arrington =

American musician and minister

- Born: Steven Ralph Arrington; March 5, 1956 (age 70)
- Origin: Dayton, Ohio, U.S.
- Genres: Funk, soul, R&B, gospel, pop
- Occupations: Singer, songwriter, drummer, producer, engineer, minister
- Years active: 1979–1990, 2009–present
- Labels: Stones Throw, Tummy Touch, Atlantic, Manhattan, God Factor Records
- Website: stevearringtonmusic.com

Steven Ralph Arrington (born March 5, 1956) is an American singer, songwriter, drummer, record producer, engineer and minister, who grew up in Dayton, Ohio.

== Biography ==
Arrington played in various local bands before joining and touring with The Murphys, a lounge band out of Toledo, Ohio, in 1975. About a year later Arrington relocated from Ohio to San Francisco, California where he learned Latin percussion and drumming as well as playing with Coke Escovedo, Pete Escovedo and Sheila E.

He joined the funk group Slave (founded 1975) on their third LP, called The Concept, in 1978 – originally to play percussion, then later becoming the drummer and a backing vocalist. Eventually Arrington took over lead vocals, singing on the hit singles "Just a Touch of Love", "Watching You" (which has been sampled by Snoop Dogg) and "Wait for Me".

Arrington left Slave in 1982, forming Steve Arrington's Hall of Fame, and had hit singles such as "Weak at the Knees" (which was sampled by Three Times Dope, Jay-Z, Jermaine Dupri, Ice Cube, and others), and "Nobody Can Be You But You".

His most successful album was his 1985 solo work Dancin' in the Key of Life, whose title track became a top ten R&B hit. The single also spent three weeks at number two on the dance charts, and went to number three on the Radio & Records R&B airplay chart. Another single from the album, "Feel So Real" reached #5 in the UK Singles Chart in May that year. He was nominated for the NAACP Image Award for Best Male Artist of 1986.

In 1984 Arrington experienced a religious conversion, later becoming a licensed minister and, in 1990, he left pop music until his re-emergence in October 2009, when he released the R&B, Funk, spiritual album Pure Thang.

In September 2010 Stones Throw Records announced that Arrington was working with producer Dâm-Funk on a new album. In February, Arrington did an interview with The Revivalist and told them his new album, "Love, Peace and Funky Beatz", was due out in late summer or early fall 2011.

On August 6, 2013, Stones Throw Records released Arrington + Dam-Funk's "Higher".

In September 2014 Tummy Touch released the album "Way Out (80–84)", a collection of songs from Hall of Fame Vol 1 and Positive Power, plus unreleased and previously unfinished material.

On September 18, 2020, Stones Throw Records released a new solo album by Steve Arrington titled Down to the Lowest Terms: The Soul Sessions with the single "Keep Dreamin'". The album recording took place in 2019–2020 in collaboration with a cast of a new generation of talented producers orchestrated with the help of Stones Throw founder Peanut Butter Wolf. Producers include DJ Harrison, Knxwledge, J Rocc, Shibo, Jerry Paper, Brian Ellis, Gifted & Blessed, and Benedek. The album was nominated for the 2021 Libera Awards for Best R&B Record.

== Discography ==
=== Albums with Steve Arrington's Hall of Fame ===
Year	Album	Chart positions		Record label
Year	Album	US	US R&B	Record label
1983	Steve Arrington's Hall of Fame, Vol.1	101	12	Atlantic
1984	Positive Power	141	36	Atlantic

=== Solo albums ===
Year	Album	Chart positions			Record label
Year	Album	US	US R&B	UK	Record label
1985	Dancin' in the Key of Life	185	32	41	Atlantic
1986	The Jammin' National Anthem	—	—	—	Atlantic
1987	Jam Packed	—	50	—	Manhattan
2009	Pure Thang	—	—	—	God Factor Records
2013	Steve Arrington & Dãm-Funk (Higher)	—	—	—	Stones Throw
2020	Down to the Lowest Terms: The Soul Sessions	—	—	—	Stones Throw
"—" denotes releases that did not chart.

=== Singles with Steve Arrington's Hall of Fame ===
Title	Year	Peak chart positions	
Title	Year	US R&B	US Dance
"Way Out"	1982	—	—
"Pocket Full of Air"	1982	—	—
"Weak at the Knees"	1983	33	—
"Way Out" (re-release)	1983	68	49
"Nobody Can Be You"	1983	18	23
"Mellow as a Cello"	1984	—	—
"15 Rounds"	1984	85	—
"Hump to the Bump"	1984	25	—
"—" denotes releases that did not chart.

=== Solo singles ===
List of singles, with selected chart positions
Title	Year	Peak chart positions							
Title	Year	UK	US	US Dance	US R&B	BEL	GER	NLD	NZ
"Summertime Lovin'"	1980	—	—	—	—	—	—	—	—
"Feel So Real"	1985	5	104	5	17	7	16	13	42
"Dancin' in the Key of Life"	1985	21	68	2	8	—	—	—	—
"Turn Up the Love"	1985	—	—	—	80	—	—	—	—
"She Just Don't Know"	1985	—	—	—	—	—	—	—	—
"The Jammin' National Anthem"	1986	—	—	—	42	—	—	—	—
"Homeboy"	1986	—	—	—	28	—	—	—	—
"Stone Love"	1987	—	—	—	33	—	—	—	—
"Lost and Found (You Can Find Me Present)"	1988	—	—	—	90	—	—	—	—
"No Reason"	1990	—	—	—	89	—	—	—	—
"Goin' Hard"	2011	—	—	—	—	—	—	—	—
"The Joys of Love"	2020	—	—	—	—	—	—	—	—
"Keep Dreamin'"	2020	—	—	—	—	—	—	—	—
"—" denotes releases that did not chart.

=== Compilation albums ===
Year	Album	Chart positions	Record label
Year	Album	US R&B	Record label
1994	Stellar Fungk: The Best of Slave featuring Steve Arrington	44	Atlantic
2003	Party Lights'	—	Atlantic
2006	Slave: The Definitive Collection	—	Atlantic
"—" denotes the album failed to chart
