= The Very Best of Death Row =

The Very Best Of Death Row

Greatest hits album by Death Row Records
- Released: February 22, 2005
- Recorded: 1992–1996
- Genre: West Coast hip hop; gangsta rap; G-funk
- Length: 1:02:07
- Label: Death Row; Koch
- Producer: Daz Dillinger; DJ Pooh; Dr. Dre; Hurt-M-Badd; Petey Pablo; Tha Row Hitters

Death Row Records chronology
Dysfunktional Family (2003)	The Very Best of Death Row (2005)	15 Years on Death Row (2006)

Professional ratings
Review scores
Source	Rating
AllMusic	3/5 stars

The Very Best Of Death Row is the second greatest hits album released by American record label Death Row Records on February 22, 2005. It contains some of the best recorded material from the label's former roster, such as 2Pac, Dr. Dre, Snoop Doggy Dogg, Tha Dogg Pound, Warren G, The Lady of Rage, Nate Dogg, Michel'le, and a previously unreleased track from Petey Pablo and Kurupt. It was re-released on November 22, 2005, via Koch Records with accompanying music videos.

The album peaked at number 94 on the Billboard 200 in the United States.

== Track listing ==
No.	Title	Writer(s)	Producer(s)	Length
1.	"Against All Odds" (performed by 2Pac, originally from The Don Killuminati: The 7 Day Theory (1996))	Tupac Shakur; Tyrone Wrice	Hurt-M-Badd; Makaveli (co.)	4:34
2.	"California Love (Remix)" (performed by 2Pac, Dr. Dre and Roger Troutman, originally from All Eyez on Me (1996))	Shakur; Andre Young; Roger Troutman; Larry Troutman; Norman Durham; Woodrow Cunningham	Dr. Dre	6:25
3.	"Gin and Juice" (performed by Snoop Doggy Dogg, originally from Doggystyle (1993))	Calvin Broadus; Young; Harry Wayne Casey; Richard Finch	Dr. Dre	3:31
4.	"Nuthin' but a 'G' Thang" (performed by Dr. Dre and Snoop Doggy Dogg, originally from The Chronic (1992))	Young; Broadus; Leon Haywood	Dr. Dre	3:58
5.	"Ambitionz az a Ridah" (performed by 2Pac, originally from All Eyez on Me (1996))	Shakur; Delmar Arnaud	Dat Nigga Daz	4:38
6.	"Who Am I (What's My Name?)" (performed by Snoop Doggy Dogg, originally from Doggystyle (1993))	Broadus; David Spradley; Garry Shilder; George Clinton	Dr. Dre	4:06
7.	"Let's Play House" (performed by Tha Dogg Pound and Michel'le, originally from Dogg Food (1995))	Arnaud; Ricardo Brown; Broadus; Nathaniel Hale; Cynthia Calhoun; Big Simon	Dat Nigga Daz	3:24
8.	"Regulate" (performed by Warren G and Nate Dogg, originally from Above the Rim – The Soundtrack (1994))	Warren Griffin III; Hale; Jerry Leiber; Mike Stoller	Warren G	4:10
9.	"Ain't No Fun (If the Homies Can't Have None)" (performed by Snoop Doggy Dogg, Nate Dogg, Warren G and Kurupt, originally from Doggystyle (1993))	Broadus; Hale; Griffin III; Brown; Young	Dr. Dre	4:06
10.	"New York, New York" (performed by Tha Dogg Pound, originally from Dogg Food (1995))	Brown; Edward Fletcher; Melvin Glover; Gene Griffin; Sylvia Robinson	DJ Pooh	4:50
11.	"Let Me Ride" (performed by Dr. Dre, originally from The Chronic (1992))	Young; Broadus; Eric Collins; Clinton; William Earl Collins	Dr. Dre	4:21
12.	"What Would You Do?" (performed by Tha Dogg Pound, originally from Murder Was the Case – The Soundtrack (1994))	Arnaud; Brown; Broadus; Jewell Caples; David Williams	Dat Nigga Daz	5:09
13.	"Afro Puffs" (performed by The Lady of Rage, originally from Above the Rim – The Soundtrack (1994))	Robin Allen; Arnaud; John Watson	Dr. Dre; Dat Nigga Daz	4:48
14.	"Off Tha Chain" (performed by Petey Pablo and Kurupt)	Moses Barrett III; Big Simon	Tha Row Hitters; Petey Pablo	4:07
Total length:				1:02:07

== Personnel ==
- Tupac Amaru Shakur – performer (tracks: 1, 2, 5), co-producer (track 1)
- Andre "Dr. Dre" Young – performer (tracks: 2, 4, 11), producer (tracks: 2–4, 6, 9, 11, 13)
- Roger Troutman – performer (track 2)
- Calvin "Snoop Dogg" Broadus – performer (tracks: 3, 4, 6, 7, 9–13)
- Ricardo "Kurupt" Brown – performer (tracks: 7, 9, 10, 12, 14)
- Delmar "Dat Nigga Daz" Arnaud – performer (tracks: 7, 10, 12), producer (tracks: 5, 7, 12, 13)
- Michel'le Toussant – performer (track 7)
- Warren Griffin III – performer (tracks: 8, 9), producer (track 8)
- Nathaniel "Nate Dogg" Hale – performer (tracks: 8, 9)
- Robyn "The Lady of Rage" Allen – performer (track 13)
- Moses "Petey Pablo" Barrett III – performer & producer (track 14)
- Tyrone "Hurt-M-Badd" Wrice – producer (track 1)
- Mark "DJ Pooh" Jordan – producer (track 10)
- Tha Row Hitters – producers (track 14)
- Marion Hugh "Suge" Knight Jr – executive producer

== Chart positions ==
Chart (2005)	Peak position
US Billboard 200	94
