= 15 Years on Death Row =

Compilation album by various artists
- Released: December 26, 2006
- Recorded: 1992–1998
- Genre: West Coast hip hop; gangsta rap; g-funk
- Length: 2:21:17
- Label: Death Row
- Producer: Suge Knight (exec.); Daz Dillinger; Dr. Dre; Johnny "J"; QD3; Reginald Heard; Sam Sneed; Stretch

Death Row Records chronology
The Death Row Singles Collection (2006)	15 Years on Death Row (2006)

Professional ratings
Review scores
Source	Rating
AllMusic	4.5/5 stars
RapReviews	8.5/10

15 Years on Death Row is a compilation album by American record label Death Row Records, released on December 26, 2006. It is originally composed of 27 songs on two compact discs and 24 music videos on a DVD, and its Best Buy Edition has extra 6 songs.

The release features several notable Death Row artists such as Snoop Dogg, Dr. Dre, 2Pac, Nate Dogg, Daz Dillinger, and The Lady of Rage. A music video DVD is included. The double album includes "G'z Up, Hoes Down", a track from Snoop Doggy Dogg's Doggystyle album that was removed for sample clearance issues.

In the United States, the compilation debuted at number 100 on the Billboard 200 and number 33 on the Top R&B/Hip-Hop Albums with 14,000 copies sold in its first week.

== Track listing ==
=== CD 1 ===
No.	Title	Producer(s)	Length
1.	"One Eight Seven" (performed by Dr. Dre)	Dr. Dre	4:28
2.	"Nuthin' But a "G" Thang" (performed by Dr. Dre and Snoop Doggy Dogg)	Dr. Dre	3:58
3.	"Dogg Pound 4 Life" (performed by Tha Dogg Pound and Snoop Doggy Dogg)	Dat Nigga Daz	4:59
4.	"Afro Puffs (Album Version)" (performed by The Lady of Rage and Snoop Doggy Dogg)	Dat Nigga Daz; Dr. Dre	4:47
5.	"Natural Born Killaz" (performed by Dr. Dre and Ice Cube)	Dr. Dre; Sam Sneed	4:51
6.	"How Do U Want It (Alternate Version)" (performed by 2Pac and K-Ci & JoJo)	Johnny "J"	3:57
7.	"Bitches Ain't Shit" (performed by Dr. Dre, Snoop Doggy Dogg, Tha Dogg Pound and Jewell)	Dr. Dre	4:46
8.	"Let Me Ride (Extended Version)" (performed by Dr. Dre, Snoop Doggy Dogg and Daz Dillinger)	Dr. Dre	4:21
9.	"Life's So Hard" (performed by 2Pac and Snoop Doggy Dogg)	Dat Nigga Daz	5:39
10.	"Big Pimpin'" (performed by Tha Dogg Pound, Snoop Doggy Dogg, Nate Dogg and Big Pimpin' Delemond)	Dat Nigga Daz	3:58
11.	"Gin and Juice" (performed by Snoop Doggy Dogg and Daz Dillinger)	Dr. Dre	3:32
12.	"G'z Up, Hoez Down (Unreleased)" (performed by Snoop Doggy Dogg)	Dr. Dre	2:21
13.	"California Love (Original Version)" (performed by 2Pac, Dr. Dre and Roger Troutman)		4:00
14.	"Don't Try to Play Me" (performed by Daz Dillinger)	Dat Nigga Daz	4:38
15.	"Made Niggaz" (performed by 2Pac and Outlawz)	Johnny "J"	5:03
16.	"Wanted Dead or Alive" (performed by 2Pac and Snoop Doggy Dogg)	Dat Nigga Daz	4:38
17.	"New York, New York" (performed by Tha Dogg Pound)	DJ Pooh	4:51

Notes

- Tracks 1, 14, 16 and 17 are exclusive for Best Buy Edition.

=== CD 2 ===
No.	Title	Producer(s)	Length
1.	"To Live & Die in L.A. (Alternate Version)" (performed by 2Pac and Val Young)	QD3	4:24
2.	"Initiated" (performed by Tha Dogg Dound, 2Pac and Outlawz)	Dat Nigga Daz	4:51
3.	"Murder Was the Case (Remix)" (performed by Snoop Doggy Dogg)	Dr. Dre	4:20
4.	"Ambitionz Az a Ridah" (performed by 2Pac)	Dat Nigga Daz	4:37
5.	"All About U" (performed by 2Pac, Dru Down, Fatal Hussein, Yaki Kadafi, Snoop Doggy Dogg and Nate Dogg)	Johnny "J"	4:36
6.	"Puffin' on Blunts and Drankin' Tanqueray" (performed by Dr. Dre, The Lady of Rage and Tha Dogg Pound)	Dr. Dre	6:23
7.	"Pain" (performed by 2Pac and Stretch)	Stretch	4:33
8.	"Doggy Dogg World" (performed by Snoop Doggy Dogg, Tha Dogg Pound and The Dramatics)	Dr. Dre	5:05
9.	"O.G." (performed by Daz Dillinger, Nate Dogg and Snoop Doggy Dogg)	Dat Nigga Daz	4:37
10.	"Fuck wit Dre Day (And Everybody's Celebratin')" (performed by Dr. Dre, Jewell, RBX and Snoop Doggy Dogg)	Dr. Dre	4:51
11.	"Never Had a Friend Like Me" (performed by 2Pac)	Johnny "J"	4:25
12.	"Ain't No Fun (If the Homies Can't Have None)" (performed by Snoop Doggy Dogg, Kurupt, Nate Dogg and Warren G)	Dr. Dre	4:04
13.	"Loyal to the Game" (performed by 2Pac, Riddler and Treach)	Reginald Heard	4:36
14.	"What Would You Do?" (performed by Tha Dogg Pound, Big Pimpin' Delemond, Jewell, Jodeci, Snoop Doggy Dogg)	Dat Nigga Daz	5:08
15.	"Life Is a Traffic Jam" (performed by 2Pac and Thandie Newton)
16.	"Why (A Tribute to 2Pac)" (performed by Nate Dogg)

Notes

- Tracks 15 and 16 are exclusive for Best Buy Edition.

=== DVD ===
No.	Title	Length
1.	"Dre Day"
2.	"Nuthin' But a "G" Thang"
3.	"Let Me Ride"
4.	"Little Ghetto Boy"
5.	"Natural Born Killaz"
6.	"What's My Name"
7.	"Gin & Juice"
8.	"Doggy Dogg World"
9.	"Murder Was the Case"
10.	"Vapors"
11.	"Doggfather"
12.	"Snoop's Upside Your Head"
13.	"Regulate"
14.	"Afro Puffs (Remix)"
15.	"How Do U Want It"
16.	"All About U"
17.	"California Love (Original Version)"
18.	"California Love (Remix Version)"
19.	"I Ain't Mad at Cha"
20.	"Hit 'Em Up"
21.	"Made Niggaz"
22.	"To Live & Die in L.A."
23.	"Toss It Up"
24.	"Hail Mary"

== Charts ==
Chart (2007)	Peak position
US Billboard 200	100
US Top R&B/Hip-Hop Albums (Billboard)	33
