= Gin and juice (cocktail) =

Gin-based cocktail

- Ingredients: Fruit juice; Simple syrup
- Base spirit: Gin

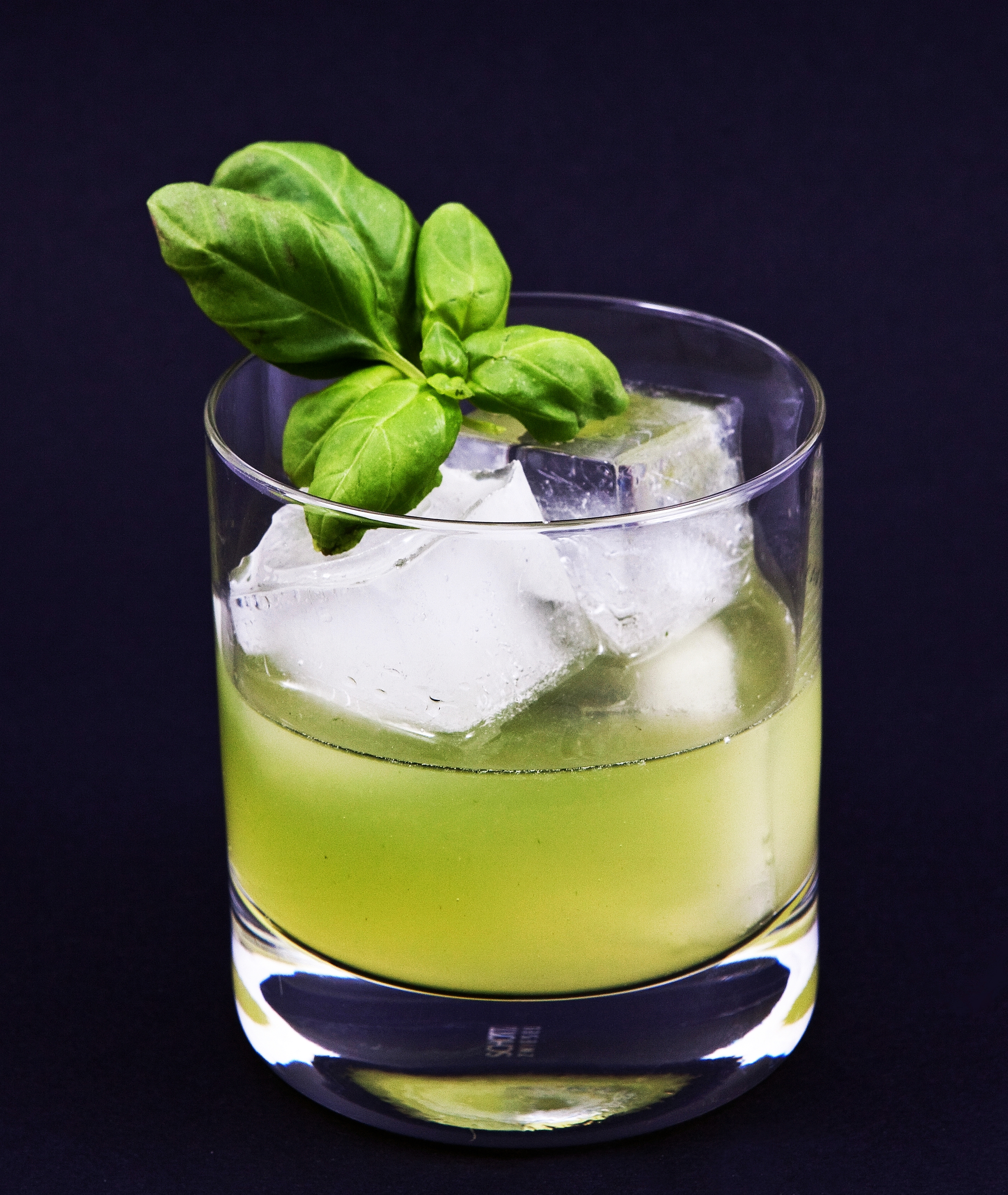
Gin Basil Smash, a cocktail made with gin, lemon juice, sugar syrup and fresh basil.

Gin and juice is a fruity cocktail made from gin and fruit juice, with simple syrup added for additional sweetness.

== In popular culture ==
The gin and juice has inspired the popular hip hop song "Gin and Juice" by Snoop Dogg, Snoop Dogg's most-streamed (on Spotify) song from his 1993 debut album Doggystyle.

In 2024, Dr Dre and Snoop Dogg created a canned alcoholic drink brand called "Gin & Juice". The concept, packaging, and graphic identity of the brand was designed by Ini Archibong, with illustrations by Wayne Johnson.
