= Danger Theatre =

American comedy anthology TV series

- Created by: Penelope Spheeris
- Presented by: Robert Vaughn
- Composer: Lalo Schifrin
- Country of origin: United States
- Original language: English
- No. of seasons: 1
- No. of episodes: 7

Production
- Running time: 30 minutes
- Production company: Universal Television

Original release
- Network: Fox
- Release: July 11 – August 22, 1993

Danger Theatre is an American half-hour comedy anthology series for television, produced by Universal Television and originally aired on the American Fox network from July 7 to August 22, 1993.

Each half-hour-long show consisted of two comedy segments, each a spoof of a familiar action/anthology format. There are two exceptions, one being “Go Ahead, Fry Me” with guest stars Liz Vassey and Sam Mann. The style of the comedy was somewhat similar to that of films like Airplane! and TV shows like Police Squad!.

Robert Vaughn was the host for each episode, introducing to the camera each fifteen-minute segment with mock earnestness. The jokes ranged from humorous or preposterous dialogue to visual gags and slapstick designed to poke fun at the serious dramatic formats being lampooned. The score for the series was composed by Lalo Schifrin.

Danger Theatre ran for seven episodes before cancellation. However, it was syndicated outside the US, airing in the UK on the BBC in 1994.

== The Searcher ==
One segment in each episode centered on a motorbike-riding, leather-clad hero called only “The Searcher", played by Diedrich Bader. A spoof of both the stereotypical motorbiking renegade from movies and the “one man on a mission” format of series such as Knight Rider, Renegade, and many others, this segment may be the most commonly remembered element of the series.

The Searcher would always appear coming over the horizon on his motorcycle, with a dramatic backing chorus, narrating :

Someone needs help, so they called me. That’s what I do. I help people in trouble... They call me "The Searcher."

A recurring visual gag would have the Searcher conclude a scene with a quizzical stare directly at camera, utter a thoughtful sound, and then suddenly be squashed by a vehicle or falling object.

The popularity of this segment led to two of Danger Theatre's seven episodes ("Go Ahead, Fry Me" and "An Old Friend for Dinner") being given over in their entirety to a 30-minute adventure for the Searcher.

== Tropical Punch ==
In four episodes of Danger Theatre, the other segment of the show was called "Tropical Punch", a send-up of Hawaii Five-O, with Adam West playing the bumbling Detective Morgan, a police detective with no clue as to what is going on. Morgan only solves crimes because his partner McCormick, played by Billy Morrisette, does know what is going on and saves him from failure constantly.

== 357 Marina del Rey ==
In the final telecast of Danger Theatre on August 22, 1993, "Tropical Punch" was replaced by a segment titled "357 Marina del Rey", which starred Todd Field as Rake Rowe and Ricky Harris as Clay Gentry in a spoof of shows about private detectives living and working in sun-and-fun vacation locales, such as 77 Sunset Strip, Surfside 6, and Hawaiian Eye. Recent college graduates Rowe and Gentry become private investigators and encounter the worst criminals in town but take a greater interest in wearing the right fashions and visiting the local cappuccino bar than in solving crimes. Only one episode of "357 Marina del Rey" was produced.

== Airing history and other details ==
Original US airdates
Sundays, Fox, 7:30 pm
July 11–August 22, 1993

Original UK airdates
Fridays, BBC2, Approx. 11.30pm
13 May - 24 June 1994

Credits
Series Produced by:
Kevin G. Cremin ....Producer
Robert Wolterstorff....Executive Producer

== External links & sources ==
- Danger Theatre at IMDb
