= I Gave You Power =

Song by Nas

from the album It Was Written
- Released: July 2, 1996
- Recorded: 1995
- Genre: East Coast hip hop, jazz rap
- Length: 3:52
- Label: Columbia
- Songwriters: Nasir Jones; Chris E. Martin
- Producer: DJ Premier
- "I Gave You Power" The song is a first-person narrative by Nas from the perspective of a gun and features a jazz fusion sample.

"I Gave You Power" is a 1996 jazz fusion-styled song on Nas' second album It Was Written. It is considered a standout song, one of Nas' greatest hits, and a hip hop "classic". It follows "Street Dreams" gaplessly on It Was Written.

== Production ==
"I Gave You Power" was produced by DJ Premier. Executive producer Steve Stoute said it was a challenge getting both Premier and Nas in the studio thanks to idiosyncrasies in timetables, so when he did get them together, he left them alone for some time. Upon returning to the studio, he was so impressed with the results that he stole the cassette and put it in his car to listen to it, much to the chagrin of Nas, who promptly rung Premier, saying, "Where the fuck is my tape?" Stoute then drove back to Queensbridge to return it.

== Lyrical content ==
The song's lyrics are a first-person narrative from the perspective of a gun. In a 2012 interview, Nas stated that he was around a lot of guns at the time he wrote "I Gave You Power" and decided to rap about it. An aggressive beat was considered, but ultimately the song ended up accompanied by falling piano notes and stuttering drums. Rolling Stone writer Mark Coleman describes its beat as "a spooky, jazz-fusion groove."

The song features a mistake at its start: "Like I'm a f-, I'm a gun, shit. It's like I'm a motherfucking gun". Tone of the Trackmasters wanted it removed, but Nas ultimately decided to keep it because otherwise listeners would not understand that the song was from the perspective of a gun. Originally the song was going to feature a skit in which somebody drops the gun and someone else picks it up.

== Follow-ups ==
"I Gave You Power" is the first in a string of Nas songs in which he personifies an object or concept. His 2006 song "Blood Diamond" was compared to "I Gave You Power" because of its use of gun personification. Other examples include "Money Is My Bitch", "Last Words", "Project Roach" and "Fried Chicken".

== Impact on hip-hop culture ==
Shortly after It Was Written was released in 1996, Tupac Shakur compared his girlfriend to a gun on the song "Me and My Girlfriend." Although the song was released posthumously, Young Noble, a close friend of Tupac Shakur, said that "I Gave You Power" served as the main inspiration for Shakur's "Me and My Girlfriend". 50 Cent used "I Gave You Power" to address evolution in hip-hop. Eminem's song "Desperation" mentions the song. Irv Gotti made an episode on the BET show Tales based on the song.
