= List of Billboard Hot 100 top-ten singles in 1994 =

This is a list of singles that charted in the top ten of the Billboard Hot 100 during 1994.

Janet Jackson scored four top ten hits during the year with "Again", "Because of Love", "Any Time, Any Place", and "You Want This", the most among all other artists.

== Top-ten singles ==
- (#) – 1994 Year-end top 10 single position and rank

List of Billboard Hot 100 top ten singles which peaked in 1994
| Top ten entry date | Single | Artist(s) | Peak | Peak date | Weeks in top ten |
Singles from 1993
| December 4 | "Breathe Again" (#7) | Toni Braxton | 3 | January 22 | 17 |
| December 4 | "Can We Talk" | Tevin Campbell | 9 | January 15 | 4 |
| December 11 | "All for Love" (#8) | Bryan Adams, Rod Stewart, and Sting | 1 | January 22 | 14 |
| December 18 | "Said I Loved You...But I Lied" | Michael Bolton | 6 | January 22 | 9 |
| December 25 | "What's My Name?" | Snoop Doggy Dogg | 8 | January 1 | 4 |
Singles from 1994
| January 22 | "The Power of Love" (#4) | Céline Dion | 1 | February 12 | 16 |
| February 5 | "The Sign" (#1) | Ace of Base | 1 | March 12 | 21 |
| February 12 | "Getto Jam" | Domino | 7 | February 12 | 2 |
| February 12 | "Linger" | The Cranberries | 8 | February 12 | 1 |
| February 12 | "Whatta Man" | Salt-n-Pepa and En Vogue | 3 | February 26 | 11 |
| February 19 | "Without You" / "Never Forget You" | Mariah Carey | 3 | March 19 | 13 |
| February 19 | "Understanding" | Xscape | 8 | February 19 | 2 |
| February 19 | "So Much in Love" | All-4-One | 5 | March 12 | 11 |
| February 26 | "Now and Forever" | Richard Marx | 7 | March 19 | 11 |
| March 5 | "Cantaloop (Flip Fantasia)" | Us3 | 9 | March 5 | 4 |
| March 12 | "Bump n' Grind" | R. Kelly | 1 | April 9 | 12 |
| March 19 | "Gin and Juice" | Snoop Doggy Dogg | 8 | March 26 | 3 |
| March 19 | "Because of Love" | Janet Jackson | 10 | March 19 | 1 |
| April 2 | "Mmm Mmm Mmm Mmm" | Crash Test Dummies | 4 | April 16 | 8 |
| April 9 | "The Most Beautiful Girl in the World" | Prince | 3 | April 30 | 11 |
| April 9 | "Streets of Philadelphia" | Bruce Springsteen | 9 | April 23 | 3 |
| April 30 | "Return to Innocence" | Enigma | 4 | May 7 | 6 |
| April 30 | "Loser" | Beck | 10 | April 30 | 1 |
| May 7 | "I'll Remember" | Madonna | 2 | May 28 | 10 |
| May 7 | "Baby, I Love Your Way" | Big Mountain | 6 | May 14 | 9 |
| May 14 | "I Swear" (#2) | All-4-One | 1 | May 21 | 18 |
| May 14 | "I'm Ready" | Tevin Campbell | 9 | May 21 | 3 |
| May 21 | "You Mean the World to Me" | Toni Braxton | 7 | May 28 | 8 |
| May 28 | "Back & Forth" | Aaliyah | 5 | July 2 | 12 |
| June 4 | "Don't Turn Around" (#10) | Ace of Base | 4 | June 18 | 15 |
| June 4 | "Regulate" | Warren G featuring Nate Dogg | 2 | July 2 | 11 |
| June 11 | "Any Time, Any Place" | Janet Jackson | 2 | June 25 | 11 |
| June 25 | "Stay (I Missed You)" (#6) | Lisa Loeb and Nine Stories | 1 | August 6 | 16 |
| July 2 | "If You Go" | Jon Secada | 10 | July 2 | 4 |
| July 9 | "Can You Feel the Love Tonight" | Elton John | 4 | August 6 | 12 |
| July 16 | "Fantastic Voyage" | Coolio | 3 | July 30 | 11 |
| July 16 | "Funkdafied" | Da Brat | 6 | August 13 | 8 |
| July 30 | "Wild Night" | John Mellencamp and Meshell Ndegeocello | 3 | September 3 | 13 |
| August 20 | "I'll Make Love to You" (#3) | Boyz II Men | 1 | August 27 | 22 |
| August 20 | "When Can I See You" | Babyface | 4 | September 10 | 11 |
| August 27 | "Stroke You Up" | Changing Faces | 3 | September 17 | 9 |
| September 10 | "This D.J." | Warren G | 9 | September 10 | 4 |
| September 17 | "Endless Love" | Luther Vandross and Mariah Carey | 2 | October 1 | 9 |
| September 17 | "All I Wanna Do" | Sheryl Crow | 2 | October 8 | 14 |
| October 1 | "(At Your Best) You Are Love" | Aaliyah | 6 | October 15 | 6 |
| October 1 | "Never Lie" | Immature | 5 | October 15 | 9 |
| October 8 | "Another Night" | Real McCoy | 3 | November 12 | 23 |
| October 15 | "Secret" | Madonna | 3 | November 5 | 11 |
| October 29 | "Always" | Bon Jovi | 4 | December 10 | 18 |
| October 29 | "Here Comes the Hotstepper" | Ini Kamoze | 1 | December 17 | 15 |
| November 5 | "I Wanna Be Down" | Brandy | 6 | December 31 | 12 |
| November 12 | "Flava In Ya Ear" | Craig Mack | 9 | November 12 | 2 |
| November 19 | "You Want This" | Janet Jackson | 8 | December 24 | 7 |
| November 26 | "On Bended Knee" | Boyz II Men | 1 | December 3 | 17 |

=== 1993 peaks ===
List of Billboard Hot 100 top ten singles in 1994 which peaked in 1993
| Top ten entry date | Single | Artist(s) | Peak | Peak date | Weeks in top ten |
|---|---|---|---|---|---|
| June 26 | "Whoomp! (There It Is)" | Tag Team | 2 | July 31 | 24 |
| October 9 | "I'd Do Anything for Love (But I Won't Do That)" | Meat Loaf | 1 | November 6 | 14 |
| October 16 | "All That She Wants" (#9) | Ace of Base | 2 | November 6 | 18 |
| October 30 | "Again" | Janet Jackson | 1 | December 11 | 15 |
| November 6 | "Gangsta Lean" | DRS | 4 | November 20 | 11 |
| November 13 | "Shoop" | Salt-N-Pepa | 4 | December 4 | 11 |
| November 20 | "Please Forgive Me" | Bryan Adams | 7 | November 20 | 8 |
| November 20 | "Hero" (#5) | Mariah Carey | 1 | December 25 | 16 |

=== 1995 peaks ===
List of Billboard Hot 100 top ten singles in 1994 which peaked in 1995
| Top ten entry date | Single | Artist(s) | Peak | Peak date | Weeks in top ten |
|---|---|---|---|---|---|
| December 3 | "Creep" | TLC | 1 | January 28 | 20 |
| December 24 | "Before I Let You Go" | Blackstreet | 7 | January 7 | 8 |
| December 31 | "I'm the Only One" | Melissa Etheridge | 8 | January 21 | 5 |
| December 31 | "Tootsee Roll" | 69 Boyz | 8 | January 7 | 3 |

== See also ==
- 1994 in music
- List of Billboard Hot 100 number ones of 1994
- Billboard Year-End Hot 100 singles of 1994
