= To Live & Die in L.A. (song) =

1996 single by Makaveli featuring Val Young

Single by Makaveli featuring Val Young

from the album The Don Killuminati: The 7 Day Theory
- B-side: "Just Like Daddy"
- Released: November 16, 1996
- Recorded: July 10, 1996
- Studio: Can-Am Studios (Tarzana, Los Angeles)
- Genre: Hip-hop; conscious hip-hop
- Length: 4:34 (album version); 4:29 (radio edit)
- Label: Death Row; Interscope
- Songwriters: Tupac Shakur; Val Young
- Producer: Quincy Jones III

Makaveli singles chronology
"Toss It Up" (1996)	"To Live & Die in L.A." (1996)	"Hail Mary" (1997)

Music video
- "To Live & Die in L.A." on YouTube

"To Live & Die in L.A." is a song by rapper Tupac Shakur from his fifth studio album, The Don Killuminati: The 7 Day Theory (1996). Released in Europe and parts of Oceania under the Makaveli stage name as the album's second single, it featured vocals from Val Young. The song peaked at number ten on the UK Singles chart and number 2 on the UK R&B chart. The album version of the song contains a Dr. Dre diss.

== Production ==
The song was produced by QDIII, son of producer Quincy Jones and brother of Shakur's girlfriend, Kidada Jones. QDIII produced numerous tracks for the album, but only "To Live & Die in L.A." made the final cut. "Lost Souls", one of the cut songs, was released the following year on Gang Related - The Soundtrack. The song contains a sample of Do Me, Baby by Prince. QDIII told XXL Magazine:

″I was in the studio with 'Pac, I had some records with me, and there was this old song that I played for him to see if he liked the vibe. He felt it and told me to go home and hook up a beat like that. I went home and hooked it up as fast as I could, and I think I came back the same night and he listened to the track three times, and in like 15 minutes he was already done with his lyrics. He went in the booth without telling anyone what the track was about he just laid it in one take—over about three tracks. Then he told Val Young what the concept was, and she went in and laid her chorus vocal in one take, too. After the vocals were done, 'Pac had Ricky Rouse [Makaveli musician] replace my keyboard bass and guitar parts with live bass and guitar parts, and the song was done—less than two hours total. This song just flowed out of everyone that was a part of it. No one thought twice; no one doubted anything. It was full speed ahead until it was done—as if it was guided or meant to be. Ever since recording like that, without thinking twice like that, I have changed the way I look at making music.″

== Music video ==
The music video for "To Live & Die In L.A." was filmed on July 23, 1996, the same day that Shakur recorded the "radio edit" version of the song, which was used for the video, radio play, and single released in Europe and parts of Oceania. It features Shakur working at a fruit stand driving around Los Angeles in a car filled with women and also features various scenes and pictures of notable places and events in Los Angeles. It was the first video shot for The Don Killuminati: The 7 Day Theory, as well as one of the last videos that Tupac filmed before his death. The video can be found on the DualDisc of the album.

== Versions ==
- Album version: With "album vibe" introduction and explicit lyrics.
- Radio/Single Version: Features a different mix than the album version, has no "album vibe" intro, has altered cleaner lyrics, and opens with Makaveli saying, "Somebody needs to do a song for L.A.".

== Track listing ==
No.	Title	Writer(s)	Producer(s)	Length
1.	"To Live & Die In L.A. (Radio Edit) featuring Val Young"	Tupac Amaru Shakur; Valaria Young; Quincy Delight Jones III	QDIII	4:27
2.	"To Live & Die In L.A. (Album Version) featuring Val Young"	Tupac Amaru Shakur; Valaria Young; Quincy Delight Jones III	QDIII	4:33
3.	"Just Like Daddy (Album Version) featuring Outlawz"	Shakur; Tyrone Wrice; Malcolm Greenidge; Rufus Lee Cooper III; Katari Terrance Cox; Yafeu Fula	Hurt-M-Badd	5:08
Total length:				14:14

== Credits ==
- Engineer – Tommy D. Daugherty
- Assistant engineer – Lance Pierre
- Executive producer – Suge Knight
- Producer – Quincy Jones III, credited as QDIII
- Featured vocals, written by Val Young
- Written by Makaveli
- This song interpolates Do Me, Baby, written and performed by Prince and André Cymone.

== Charts ==
Chart performance for "To Live & Die in L.A."
Chart (1997)	Peak position
Australia (ARIA)	82
New Zealand (Recorded Music NZ)	9
UK Singles (Official Charts)	10
UK Dance (Official Charts)	18
UK Hip Hop/R&B (Official Charts)	2
