= Doggy Dogg World =

Single by Snoop Doggy Dogg featuring Tha Dogg Pound and The Dramatics

from the album Doggystyle
- Released: April 14, 1994
- Genre: G-funk; R&B
- Length: 5:38
- Label: Death Row; Interscope
- Songwriters: Delmar Drew Arnaud; Richard Fields; Ricardo Emmanuel Brown; Calvin Broadus
- Producer: Dr. Dre

Snoop Doggy Dogg singles chronology
"Gin and Juice" (1994)	"Doggy Dogg World" (1994)	"Afro Puffs" (1994)

Tha Dogg Pound singles chronology
"Doggy Dogg World" (1994)	"What Would You Do?" (1995)

Music video
- "Doggy Dogg World" on YouTube

"Doggy Dogg World" is a song by American rapper Snoop Doggy Dogg, released in April 1994 by Death Row and Interscope as the third and final single from his debut album, Doggystyle (1993). The song was produced by Dr. Dre and features 1970s-era classic R&B and soul group The Dramatics, with guest rap verses from Kurupt and Dat Nigga Daz (Tha Dogg Pound). It also samples Richard "Dimples" Fields' "If It Ain't One Thing, It's Another" from his 1982 album Mr. Look So Good, and its title is an eggcorn of the phrase "Dog-Eat-Dog World." The Dramatics featured on the song at Snoop Dogg's request after he contacted Dramatics leader L.J. Reynolds through their longtime bassist Tony Green, who was in Death Row's circle. The single peaked at #25 on the Billboard Hot R&B/Hip-Hop Songs chart but did not enter the Billboard 200.

== Critical reception ==
Larry Flick of Billboard] wrote, "The Dogg-man once again tells it like it is, layering a slow flow with a rugged rap. The groove merges together the old and the new, represented by the raw and raunchy rap of newcomers Tha Dogg Pound and the cool and collected crooning of '70s legends the Dramatics. It's a lethal mixture, hitting hard on the senses. Dramatics fans will delight in hearing elements of the 1971 hit 'Whatcha See Is Whatcha Get'." Andy Beevers from Music Week and Mark Frith from Smash Hits both gave "Doggy Dogg World" a score of four out of five. Frith wrote, "Snoop Dogg is, like, so chilled and laid back that he barely bothers to feature on his own records these days. He's joined by his Dogg Pound, an excellent soul backing band, and a couple of ace producers. Very impressive, though, and yet another big hit." James Hamilton from the Record Mirror Dance Update named it a "Dramatics-based superb muttering sinuous gangsta rap" in his weekly dance column.

== Music video ==
The accompanying music video for "Doggy Dogg World" is set in and pays homage to the 1970s era of funk, Blaxploitation films, and black television sitcoms, while featuring many actors revisiting their past roles in such productions. It was shot at the now-defunct Carolina West Nightclub in Los Angeles and released for the week ending April 10, 1994.

Cast

- Snoop Doggy Dogg as "Silky Slim"
- The Dramatics as "The Fabulous Dramatics"
- Ricky Harris as "Taa Dow"
- Antonio Fargas as "Huggy Bear"
- Fred Berry as "Rerun"
- Fred Williamson as "The Hammer"
- Kurupt as "Small Change Willy from Philly"
- Dr. Dre as "Fortieth St. Black"
- Pam Grier as "Foxy Brown"
- Rudy Ray Moore as "Dolemite"
- Dat Nigga Daz as "Sugafoot"
- Ron O'Neal as "Supa Fly"

== Track listing ==
- 12-inch single
1. "Doggy Dogg World" (Perfecto mix) — 5:40
2. "Doggy Dogg World" (LP version) — 5:04
3. "Doggy Dogg World" (Dr. Dre radio edit) — 4:26
4. "Doggy Dogg World" (Perfecto X-Rated mix) — 5:28

Note: Tracks 1 and 4 were remixed by Oakenfold.

== Charts ==
Chart (1994)	Peak position
Europe (European Dance Radio)	23
Ireland (IRMA)	29
Scottish Singles Sales (Official Charts)	48
UK Singles (Official Charts)	32
UK Dance (Official Charts)	7
UK Dance (Music Week)	7
UK Club Chart (Music Week)	41
US Radio Songs (Billboard)	46
US Hot R&B/Hip-Hop Songs (Billboard)	25
US Rhythmic Airplay (Billboard)	19
