= Doggystyle =

1993 studio album by Snoop Dogg

Studio album by Snoop Doggy Dogg
- Released: November 23, 1993
- Recorded: 1993
- Studios: The Village (West Los Angeles); The Complex (Los Angeles); Larrabee North (North Hollywood); Larrabee West (West Hollywood)
- Genres: West Coast hip-hop; gangsta rap; G-funk
- Length: 54:44
- Labels: Death Row; Interscope; Atlantic
- Producer: Dr. Dre

Snoop Doggy Dogg chronology
Doggystyle (1993)	Tha Doggfather (1996)

Singles from Doggystyle
- 1. "Who Am I? (What's My Name?)" Released: November 11, 1993; 2. "Gin and Juice" Released: January 18, 1994; 3. "Doggy Dogg World" Released: April 14, 1994

Doggystyle is the debut studio album by American rapper Snoop Doggy Dogg. It was released on November 23, 1993, by Death Row and Interscope Records. The album was recorded and produced following Snoop Doggy Dogg's appearances on Dr. Dre's debut solo album The Chronic (1992), to which Snoop contributed significantly. The West Coast style in hip-hop that he developed from Dre's first album continued on Doggystyle. Critics have praised Snoop Dogg for the lyrical "realism" that he delivers on the album and for his distinctive vocal flow.

Despite some mixed criticism of the album initially upon its release, Doggystyle earned recognition from many music critics as one of the most significant albums of the 1990s, as well as one of the most important hip-hop albums ever released. Much like The Chronic, the distinctive sounds of Doggystyle helped introduce the hip-hop subgenre of g-funk to a mainstream audience, bringing forward West Coast hip-hop as a dominant force in the early-mid 1990s.

Doggystyle debuted at number one on the Billboard 200, selling 806,858 copies in its first week alone in the United States, which was the record for a debuting artist and the fastest-selling hip-hop album ever at the time. Doggystyle was included on The Source magazine's list of the 100 Best Rap Albums, as well as Rolling Stone magazine's list of Essential Recordings of the '90s. About.com placed the album in No. 17 of the greatest hip hop/rap albums of all time. The album was certified 4× Platinum by the Recording Industry Association of America (RIAA). By November 2015, the album had sold 7 million copies in the United States, and over 11 million copies worldwide.

== Conception ==
=== Background ===
In 1992, Snoop Dogg came to attention of the music industry through his vocal contributions on Dr. Dre's The Chronic. That album is considered to have "transformed the entire sound of West Coast rap" by its development of what later became known as the "G-funk" sound. The Chronic expanded gangsta rap with profanity, anti-authoritarian lyrics and multi-layered samples taken from 1970's P-Funk records. Snoop Doggy Dogg contributed vocals to Dre's solo single, "Deep Cover", which led to a high degree of anticipation among hip hop for the release of his own solo album.

Doggystyle and The Chronic are associated with each other mainly because each prominently featured Snoop Dogg and because both contain G-funk style production from Dr. Dre. The two releases are linked by the high number of vocal contributions from Death Row Records artists, including Tha Dogg Pound, RBX and the Lady of Rage, while both contain a high density of misogyny and profanity in their lyrics. In addition, the two albums are each viewed by critics as early "G-funk classics", and have been described as "joined at the hip". 'Doggystyle' also marked the debut of Death Row vocalist, Nanci Fletcher—the daughter of jazz legend Sam Fletcher.

Gangsta rap has been criticized for its extreme lyrics, which are often accused of glamorizing gang violence and black-on-black crime. The rappers responded that they were simply describing the realities of life in Compton and Long Beach, California. Describing Doggystyle in 1993, Snoop Doggy Dogg likewise points to the album's realism, and the extent to which it is based on his personal experience. He said, "I can't rap about something I don't know. You'll never hear me rapping about no bachelor's degree. It's only what I know and that's that street life. It's all everyday life, reality." Explaining his intentions, Snoop Doggy Dogg claims he feels he is a role model to many young black men, and that his songs are designed to relate to their concerns. "For little kids growing up in the ghettos," he said, "it's easy to get into the wrong types of things, especially gangbanging and selling drugs. I've seen what that was like, and I don't glorify it, but I don't preach. I bring it to them rather than have them go find out about it for themselves." He further explained the "dream" that he would pursue after making the album: "I'm going to try to eliminate the gang violence. I'll be on a mission for peace. I know I have a lot of power. I know if I say, 'Don't kill', niggas won't kill".

=== Recording ===
Snoop Dogg (formerly known as Snoop Doggy Dogg) (pictured in 1993) wrote the majority of Doggystyle while in the studio.

Doggystyle was recorded in early 1993 at Death Row Studios. It was produced in a style similar to The Chronic; some critics called it a "carbon copy". Snoop Doggy Dogg collaborated with two music groups, 213 and Tha Dogg Pound. Daz Dillinger, of the latter group, accused Dr. Dre of taking sole recognition for producing the album and alleged that Warren G and himself contributed substantially to the production of the project. Death Row Records co-founder Marion "Suge" Knight stated in 2013 that, "Daz pretty much did the whole album", and that credit was signed over to Dr. Dre for a fee. Snoop Doggy Dogg said Dr. Dre was capable of making beats without the help of collaborators and addressed the issues with Warren G and Daz, stating "They made beats, Dre produced that record". He discussed the track "Ain't No Fun (If the Homies Can't Have None)", mentioning that Daz and Warren G brought Dr. Dre the beat but "Dre took that muthafucka to the next level!" Bruce Williams, closely affiliated with Dr. Dre, discussed the recording process during Dre's time at Death Row Records, stating:

Dre's going to be the first one in the studio and the last one to leave. He'll start messing with a beat. As the beat starts pumping, the guys start filtering in. Everybody will get their little drink and smoke in. Soon enough, the beat starts to make a presence. You'll look around the room and every cat that was a rapper – from Kurupt to Daz to Snoop – will grab a pen. They would start writing while Dre is making a beat so by the time he's finished with the beat, they are ready to hit the booth and start spittin'. To see those young cats – they were all hungry and wanted to make something dope. The atmosphere that was there, you couldn't be wack.

Williams said the album was never finished and because of the demand for the record, the distributors insisted the album be completed, otherwise they would cancel the album's orders. This resulted in Dr. Dre mixing the album and inserting the skits within 48 hours, which enabled the album to be released. Rolling Stone writer Jonathan Gold described how Dr. Dre produced a beat from scratch to complete instrumental: "Dre may find something he likes from an old drum break, loop it and gradually replace each part with a better tom-tom sound, a kick-drum sound he adores, until the beat bears the same relationship to the original that the Incredible Hulk does to Bill Bixby". Gold also described how the track progressed with other musicians adding to the song, stating "A bass player wanders in, unpacks his instrument and pops a funky two-note bass line over the beat, then leaves to watch CNN, though his two notes keep looping into infinity. A smiling guy in a striped jersey plays a nasty one-fingered melody on an old Minimoog synthesizer that's been obsolete since 1982, and Dre scratches in a sort of surfadelic munching noise, and then from his well-stocked Akai MPC60 samples comes a shriek, a spare piano chord, an ejaculation from the first Beastie's record—'Let me clear my throat'—and the many-layered groove is happening, bumping, breathing, almost loud enough to see."

While recording Doggystyle with Dr. Dre in August 1993, Snoop Dogg was arrested in connection with the death of Phillip Woldermarian, a member of a rival gang who was shot and killed in a gang fight. According to the charges, the rapper's bodyguard shot Woldermarian as Snoop Dogg drove the vehicle; the rapper claimed it was self-defense, alleging the victim was stalking him. He spent most of 1995 preparing the case which went to trial in late 1995. He was cleared of all charges in February 1996 when he began working on his second album, Tha Doggfather.

=== Title significance and artwork ===
The album's title alludes to the doggy style sex position and is a reference to the musician's name. The artwork was done by the late artist Darryl "Joe Cool" Daniel, Snoop Dogg's cousin, who died in July 2024. The artwork represents the themes covered in the album and the style of implementation of those ideas. Some critics believe the artwork objectifies women which they believe adheres to the narcissistic and sexist lyrical themes Snoop Dogg covers. In this interpretation, the cover art and lyrics convey what they refer to as the self-indulgent "gangsta" lifestyle: drugs, cars, sex, and money. The artwork uses several quotes from the 1982 George Clinton single "Atomic Dog". The quotes come from the dogs at the top of the brick wall on the album cover, which say, "Why must I feel like dat?", "Why must I chase da cat?" and "Nuttin' but da dogg in me".

== Music ==
=== Production ===
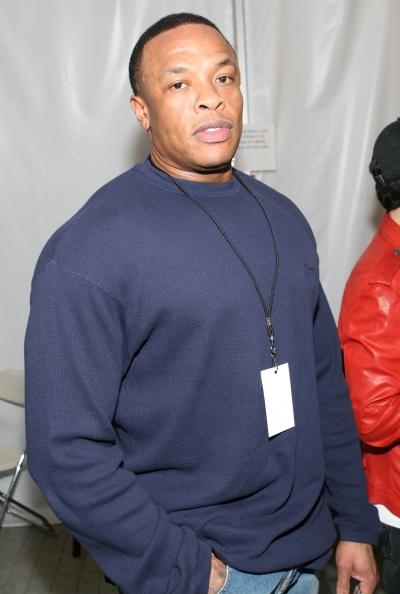
Snoop collaborated with fellow hitmaker Dr. Dre (pictured in 2008) on the album production.

Dre's handling of the production was praised by critics. AllMusic writer Stephen Erlewine stated: "Dre realized that it wasn't time to push the limits of G-funk, and instead decided to deepen it musically, creating easy-rolling productions that have more layers than they appear". He added that the beats were "laid-back funky, continuing to resonate after many listens". Rolling Stone writer Touré noted "The Chronic's slow, heavy beats were a sonic representation of angry depression as accurate as Cobain's feedback blasts; Doggystyle is leaner, with its high-tempo Isaac Hayes and Curtis Mayfield-derived tracks". He went on to say that "Most of Dre's hooks and nearly all his beats refuse to linger, as if the songs themselves are nervous, fearful of exposure, restless to get offscreen." Entertainment Weekly magazine's David Browne mentioned that "The mix of samples and live music on Dre's latest, The Chronic, gave it texture and depth, and he continues his knob-turning growth on Doggystyle, fluidly weaving together a gaggle of background singers and rappers, quirky samples, his trademark horror-flick keyboard lines". The Source magazine columnist wrote: "Dre's brand of G-funk may be common now, but it is still painstakingly well-produced".

In 2023, former Death Row CEO, Suge Knight, stated that Daz Dillinger had actually produced the album. Daz would later refute this claim.

=== Lyrics ===
Snoop Doggy Dogg's lyrics were generally praised by critics, although they caused some controversy. He was acclaimed for the realism in his rhymes and his harmonious flow. AllMusic's Stephen Erlewine commended Snoop Doggy Dogg, saying: "he's one of hip-hop's greatest vocal stylists with this record" and he "takes his time, playing with the flow of his words, giving his rhymes a nearly melodic eloquence. Snoop is something special, with unpredictable turns of phrase, evocative imagery, and a distinctive, addictive flow". Time magazine's Christopher John Farley noted "Snoop's rapping isn't flashy, but it is catchy" and stated "His relaxed vocal style is a perfect match for Dre's bass-heavy producing. Snoop's voice is lithe enough to snake its way around the big beats," said Farley on November 29, 1993.

The ideas put forward through the lyrics include Snoop Doggy Dogg's adolescent urges, as he freely talks of casual sex, smoking marijuana and gunning down rival gang members. Time magazine remarked that the notions "are often unnecessarily graphic; at some points they're downright obscene" and that "the album would have been stronger if such misgivings about the criminal life, as well as Snoop's touches of introspection, had been applied to some of the cruder songs". The album also covered gun play, drug dealing and pimping. The New York Times said that the lyrical concepts were delivered in "crudest, rudest terms".

Some critics said Snoop Doggy Dogg was "obsessed with being a 'G', a gangster, a lawbreaker who smokes dope and kills with impunity" and that his lyrics depict the black-on-black crime in the inner-cities. The lyrics involve many derogatory terms against women, with expressions such as "bitches" and "hoes" being used throughout, which illustrates the feeling of sexism and oppression within American society. In certain tracks Snoop Doggy Dogg and Tha Dogg Pound casually speak of group sex, illustrating the demeaning of women. Snoop Doggy Dogg's lyrics depict drugs, alcohol, sex, and money as methods of escape from oppression, but they also show an underside of the "gangsta" lifestyle and the results of following this lifestyle. The lyrics' violent representations, including murder and aggressive behaviour, have also generated controversy. C. DeLores Tucker of the National Political Congress of Black Women named gangsta rap "a profane and obscene glorification of murder and rape", which can be attributed to Doggystyle.

=== Content ===
"Who Am I? (What's My Name?)" was the first single released from the album, on November 11, 1993. It peaked at No. 8 on the Billboard Hot 100 and Hot R&B/Hip-Hop Singles & Tracks chart and reached No. 1 on the Hot Rap Singles, receiving a Gold certification from the RIAA on February 8, 1994. It reached No. 20 on the UK Singles Chart in 1994 and re-entered the chart in 2004, reaching No. 100.

"Gin and Juice" was the second single released on January 18, 1994. Like the previous single, it was a hit on multiple charts. It reached No. 8 on the Billboard Hot 100, No. 13 on the Hot R&B/Hip-Hop Singles & Tracks, No. 1 on Hot Rap Singles, and No. 39 on the UK Singles Chart. The RIAA certified it Gold on April 6, 1994. The song was nominated at the 1995 Grammy Awards for Best Rap Solo Performance, but lost to Queen Latifah's "U.N.I.T.Y.". "Doggy Dogg World" was released as a Europe-only single on August 8, 1994. Even though the single was not officially released in the U.S., it received some radio airplay which resulted in position 19 on the Rhythmic Top 40 chart. A music video was produced for the single, which gained American video TV-play and won the 1994 MTV Video Music Award for Best Rap Video. It reached No. 32 on the UK Singles Chart.

"Lodi Dodi" and "Murder Was the Case" were not official singles, but they received radio airplay and charted in Rhythmic Top 40. An 18-minute music video was shot for the two songs, with an accompanying Murder Was the Case soundtrack. The video won the 1995 Video of the Year award at The Source Hip-Hop Music Awards. "Gin and Juice" was nominated at the 37th Annual Grammy Awards for Best Rap Solo Performance. A bonus track, "Gz Up, Hoes Down", was included in the album's first pressing, but not in later versions because of sample clearance issues. Snoop Doggy Dogg could not gain the rights to use the beats because the record company was not willing to pay license fees for using the samples. "Gz Up, Hoes Down" was later released on the Death Row compilation 15 Years on Death Row.

A track titled "Tha Next Episode" was listed as the last track on the back cover of the first pressings, but not included in any pressing. It is considered the original material used for the 2000 Dr. Dre single "The Next Episode" but bears no resemblance to the later song. It was 4 minutes and 36 seconds (4:36) long. "Tha Next Episode" was later released on the Dr. Dre mixtape Pretox under the name "Chronic Unreleased Studio Session", but only 1:10 long. "Doggystyle" featuring George Clinton was a 5:26 long outtake from the album sessions. It is a singing melody with vocals dominating the song and it extensively samples "Oh I" by Funkadelic from their album The Electric Spanking of War Babies. Jewell & The Brides of Funkenstein are featured on the chorus. The song was released on Death Row: The Lost Sessions Vol. 1 amongst other songs recorded by Snoop Doggy Dogg during his tenure at Death Row.

== Legacy and influence ==
=== Hip-hop music ===
Doggystyle is seen by many hip hop pundits as a "classic". It is credited with defining West Coast hip hop; shifting the emphasis to more melodious, synth-driven, and funk-induced beats. About.com stated during the period the album was released, "Gangsta rap never sounded so sweet." The album is credited for further establishment of the slurred "lazy drawl" that sacrificed lyrical complexity for clarity and rhythmic cadence on Doggystyle and The Chronic. The album is considered one of the first G-funk albums, the style of which many rappers duplicated in later years.

=== Hip-hop culture ===
It has been suggested by some writers and publications that Doggystyle has considerably affected African-American culture. Some publications have held the rap genre responsible for social problems such as sexual violence and sexism, which has been blamed on Snoop Doggy Dogg and other rappers for calling their controversial lyrics "keeping it real." The problems of sexual violence and sexism are attributed to lyrics degrading women such as "bitches" and "ho's," which some believe have influenced black males. Snoop Doggy Dogg and other hip hop artists, including N.W.A, especially Eazy-E, Dr. Dre and Ice Cube (due to their success) and 2Pac, have been held accountable for developing the gangsta rap form; a genre which articulated the rage of the urban underclass and its sense of intense oppression and defiant rebellion, which has been attained through the ability to communicate free of censorship, and has allowed hip hop culture to become a dominant style and ethos throughout the world. Mariah Carey sampled the song "Ain't No Fun (If the Homies Can't Have None)" in her 1999 album Rainbow for the remix of Heartbreaker which featured Missy Elliott and Da Brat.

The writers of Enculturation, Steven Best and Douglas Kellner, have noted that Snoop Doggy Dogg and other rappers only condemn violence when it is directed against them, otherwise "they celebrate it, internalize it, and embrace it as an ethos and means of self expression," which some believe has an effect on the black-on-black crime. The release of music videos from Doggystyle and The Chronic has enabled the artists to add visual illustrations to their lyrics, which generally involve Dr. Dre and Snoop Doggy Dogg driving around South Central Los Angeles in a lowrider (a vehicle with lowered suspension). This imagery of the "gangsta lifestyle" is thought to have influenced young black males into trying to live the same lifestyle and it is also noted by T. Denean, writer of Pimps Up, Ho's Down: Hip Hop's Hold on Young Black Women, that the videos highlight the representation of class, race and Black masculinity within contemporary urban America.

=== Subsequent work ===
Doggystyle is generally considered Snoop Dogg's best album, in addition to being his highest charting and best-selling album as his later albums were certified double Platinum, Platinum or Gold although Da Game Is to Be Sold, Not to Be Told was certified double Platinum making it his second best-selling album and also his only other one to be certified multi-Platinum. Doggystyle differs from following albums as his later work featured production from multiple individuals, such as the Neptunes, Timbaland and Daz Dillinger, with reduced input from Dr. Dre, which shows a shift from G-funk production. Snoop Doggy Dogg's follow-up album, Tha Doggfather (1996), did not involve Dr. Dre, as he left Death Row Records. As a result, DJ Pooh was the main beat-maker for the album. Tha Doggfather followed the methods of a G-funk record and initially sold well, but received mixed reviews and failed to produce a major hit single. In 1998, Snoop Dogg left Death Row and joined No Limit Records, changing his stage name from Snoop Doggy Dogg to Snoop Dogg. During his tenure at the label, he continued several of the themes from Doggystyle with follow-ups to earlier songs, such as "Gin & Juice II" (1998) and "Snoop Dogg (What's My Name II)" (2000).

Subsequent studio albums such as Paid tha Cost to Be da Boss (2002) and R&G (Rhythm & Gangsta): The Masterpiece (2004) exhibited a more mainstream, pop-oriented theme with new sounds, but remained "hardcore throughout" and featured "plenty of street and commercial appeal". These releases included three hit singles, "Beautiful", "Drop It Like It's Hot" and "Signs". Snoop Dogg was credited for returning to his G-funk roots with his eighth studio album Tha Blue Carpet Treatment (2006). In October 2022, Snoop announced a spiritual sequel to Doggystyle, also produced by Dr. Dre. The album, titled Missionary, was released by Death Row and Dr. Dre's label, Aftermath, on December 13, 2024.

In March 2022, Doggystyle and many other Death Row albums were removed from streaming services; they returned on March 10, 2023.

== Critical reception ==
Professional ratings
Initial reviews (in 1993/1994)
Review scores
Source	Rating
Chicago Sun-Times	4/4 stars
Entertainment Weekly	B−
Los Angeles Times	3.5/4 stars
Music Week	4/5 stars
Rolling Stone	4/5 stars
Select	2/5 medals
The Source	4/5 stars

Professional ratings
Retrospective reviews (after 1993/1994)
Review scores
Source	Rating
AllMusic	5/5 stars
Encyclopedia of Popular Music	4/5 stars
Q	4/5 stars
Spin Alternative Record Guide	6/10

Doggystyle was released to widespread critical acclaim. Rolling Stone writer Touré mentioned "Doggystyle is filled with verbal and vocal feats that meet its high expectations. It speeds through 55 minutes of constant talk as if on a suicide hot line". David Browne of Entertainment Weekly noted "It is the most limber, low-rider gangsta album to date" and went on to say "Doggystyle is a grim, bleak-faced record. It's set in a dead-end, no-tomorrow world of cheap thrills". Stephen Thomas Erlewine of AllMusic stated "Doggystyle and The Chronic stand proudly together as the twin pinnacles of West Coast G-funk hip-hop of the early '90s" Stylus magazine presented "The Chronic vs. Doggystyle" article, and stated a strong point of Doggystyle compared to Dre's album was its follow-up singles and that "some of the album tracks are more famous than the singles".

Vibe magazine expressed that "Snoop is no ordinary gangsta; that's impossible for an artist this playful. On his debut, with Dre riding shotgun anthems abound as often as gin-soaked debauchery". The Source magazine gave the album a 4/5 mic rating. It said Snoop Doggy Dogg emerged as a rapper who lived up to all the advance hype which came from his work on The Chronic, and discussed songs on the record, stating "If 'Murder Was The Case' is a stroke of near genius, then 'Lodi Dodi' is an example of total genius." NME magazine called the lead single "a pinnacle he conquered effortlessly" and went on to name the record a "benchmark album".

The album also received some negative criticism. Erlewine mentioned the album did not "surprise or offer anything that wasn't already on The Chronic". Christopher John Farley noted Snoop Doggy Dogg had little examination over his emotions and feelings. David Browne spoke of "Ain't No Fun", stating it was an example of how "musically artful, yet lyrically repellent, this album can be" and went on to say, "It's easy to be impressed one moment and appalled the next". Renowned rock critic Robert Christgau gave the album a "dud" rating, which signifies "a bad record whose details rarely merit further thought. At the upper level it may merely be overrated, disappointing, or dull. Down below it may be contemptible." Q's Danny Kelly observed: "Snoop Doggy Dogg's record is more or less a 19-track homage to/gleeful rip off of George Clinton's 'Atomic Dog' ... It's inclined to become a touch unimaginative; a tad, let's be honest, dull ... And the sleeve competes with The Waterboys' Dream Harder and Billy Joel's River of Dreams as the worst attached to a recent release."

Despite the initial mixed criticism, critical perception of the album later improved, as Doggystyle has earned several accolades and rankings on critics' "best album" lists. A review of the album's reissue upped Q's rating from three to four stars out of five. "A modern classic," observed reviewer Tom Doyle. In 2020, "Doggystyle" placed 340 in Rolling Stone's Top 500 Albums of All Time. In a 2022 ranking of 14 Snoop Dogg albums, Kyle Anderson of Entertainment Weekly placed Doggystyle first. The album was also placed at number 84 on Apple Music's 100 Best Albums list in 2024.

=== Accolades ===
Publication	Country	Accolade	Year	Rank
About.com	United States	10 Essential Hip-Hop Albums	2006	10
Blender	U.S.	500 CDs You Must Own Before You Die	2003	*
Ego Trip	U.S.	Hip Hop's 25 Greatest Albums by Year 1980–98	1999	3
Pause & Play	U.S.	Albums Inducted into a Time Capsule, One Album per Week	-	*
Pause & Play	U.S.	The 90s Top 100 Essential Albums	1999	11
Pitchfork	U.S.	The 100 Best Rap Albums of All Time	2025	100
Rolling Stone	U.S.	The Essential Recordings of the 90s	1999	*
Rolling Stone	U.S.	The 500 Greatest Albums of All Time	2020	340
Rolling Stone (Chris Rock)	U.S.	The Chris Rock 25	2005	2
Stylus	U.S.	Top 200 Albums of All time	2004	115
The Source	U.S.	The 100 Best Rap Albums	1998	*
The New Nation	United Kingdom	Top 100 Albums by Black Artists	-	30
Robert Dimery	-	1001 Albums You Must Hear Before You Die	2005	*
* denotes an unranked list

== Commercial performance ==
Doggystyle debuted at number one on the US Billboard 200, powered by spectacular first week sales of 806,000 copies. In the second week Doggystyle remained at the top of the Billboard 200, selling 378,000 copies. In the third week the album dropped to number 2 on the chart, selling 259,000. In the fourth week the album dropped to number 3 on the Billboard 200, selling 297,000 copies. In the fifth week the album remained number 3 on the Billboard 200, selling 407,000 copies. In the sixth week the album returned to the top of the Billboard 200, selling 270,000 copies, marking Doggystyle's last week at the top of the chart to date. Doggystyle topped the Top R&B/Hip-Hop Albums chart for five weeks. As of November 2015, the album had sold seven million copies in the United States, and over eleven million copies worldwide.

It was certified four times platinum by the Recording Industry Association of America on May 31, 1994. It is Snoop Doggy Dogg's most successful album; his following albums were certified single or double platinum. Doggystyle first appeared on music charts in 1993, peaking on the Billboard 200 and Top R&B/Hip-Hop Albums at No. 1. It re-peaked at number one on the Billboard 200 in January 1994, when it was already certified three times platinum by the RIAA. The record was mildly successful in Europe, reaching No. 18 in Sweden, No. 21 in Germany and No. 35 in Austria. It also peaked at No. 25 on the Recording Industry Association of New Zealand album chart. At the end of 1994, the album was No. 3 on the Billboard Year-End Top Albums Chart and No. 1 on the Billboard Year-End Top R&B/Hip-Hop Albums Chart. It re-entered the charts in 2003, peaking on the Ireland Albums Top 75 at No. 70. As of September 2015, it had spent a total of 74 nonconsecutive weeks on the Billboard 200 album chart.

== Track listing ==
- All songs produced by Dr. Dre.

No.	Title	Writer(s)	Length
1.	"Bathtub" (featuring Warren G)	Calvin Broadus; Andre Young; Curtis Mayfield	1:50
2.	"G Funk Intro" (featuring The Lady of Rage & George Clinton)	Broadus; Young; Robin Allen; George Clinton; Philippe Wynn	2:24
3.	"Gin and Juice" (featuring Dat Nigga Daz)	Broadus; Young; Harry Wayne Casey; Richard Finch; Delmar Arnaud; Steve Arrington; Mark Adams; Raymond Turner; Daniel Webster; Stephen Washington	3:31
4.	"W Balls" (The Queen of Funk & Ricky Harris)	Broadus	0:36
5.	"Tha Shiznit"	Broadus; Young	4:04
6.	"Domino Intro" (featuring Daz Dillinger & Dr. Dre)	Broadus	0:37
7.	"Lodi Dodi" (featuring Nancy Fletcher)	Broadus; Young; Douglas Davis; Ricky Walters	4:24
8.	"Murder Was the Case (DeathAfterVisualizingEternity)" (featuring Dat Nigga Daz)	Broadus; Young; Delmar Arnaud; Warren Griffin; Rojai Trawick	3:38
9.	"Serial Killa" (featuring The D.O.C., Tha Dogg Pound, and RBX)	Broadus; Young; Arnaud; Eric Collins; Joseph Williams; Philip Thomas; Ricardo Brown; Lawrence Parker; Clarence Satchell; Gregory Webster; Leroy Bonner; Marshall Jones; Marvin Pierce; Norman Napier; Ralph Middlebrooks; Walter Morrison	3:32
10.	"Who Am I? (What's My Name?)" (featuring Jewell & Shana D)	Broadus; Young; Clinton; Bernie Worrell; David Spradley; Garry Shider; William Collins; Jerome Brailey; Mose Davis	4:06
11.	"For All My Niggaz & Bitches" (performed by Tha Dogg Pound and The Lady of Rage)	Broadus; Young; Arnaud; Brown; Allen	4:43
12.	"Ain't No Fun (If the Homies Can't Have None)" (featuring Nate Dogg, Warren G, and Kurupt)	Broadus; Young; Brown; Griffin; Nathaniel Hale	4:06
13.	"Chronic Relief Intro" (interlude)	Broadus Jr.	0:33
14.	"Doggy Dogg World" (featuring Tha Dogg Pound, The Dramatics & Nancy Fletcher)	Broadus; Young; Arnaud; Brown; Richard Fields; Belinda Wilson	5:05
15.	"Class Room Intro" (featuring Lil' Bow Wow & Warren G)	Broadus	0:44
16.	"Gz and Hustlas"	Broadus; Young; Arnaud; Don Blackman	3:51
17.	"Checkin'" (featuring Nanci Fletcher & Sam Sneed)	Broadus; Young	0:57
18.	"Gz Up, Hoes Down"	Broadus; Young; Arnaud	2:21
19.	"Pump Pump" (featuring Lil Malik)	Broadus; Young; Lamorris Edwards	3:42
Total length:			54:44

=== Notes ===
- "Gz Up, Hoes Down" was included on initial album pressings, but was subsequently omitted due to sample clearance issues. It was later included on the 2006 compilation, 15 Years on Death Row, as well as 30th anniversary vinyl and CD pressings.
- 2001 pressings and onwards condense the album's interludes with the proceeding tracks; totaling 13 tracks.
- On the U.S. original release's back cover "Gz Up, Hoes Down" is erroneously listed after "Pump Pump" instead of immediately before.
- Original pressings in Europe features track names for all interludes - the interlude track names listed above are taken from the said European release. "W Balls" was the only interlude listed on the original American release. All interludes, including "W Balls" were later omitted from all track listings.
- The original pressings of the album, which contains "Gz Up, Hoes Down", list an outro track titled, "Tha Next Episode", but does not feature on any pressings of the album. A low-quality recording of the song later leaked online sometime in the late 2000s.

=== Cut tracks ===
- "Tha Next Episode", produced by and featuring Dr. Dre, was listed on the track listing provided to retailers before the album's release, but does not feature on any pressings of the album. A similar instrumental (i.e., it used the same sample as its main melody) was later used for Warren G's track "Runnin' Wit No Breaks" from his 1994 debut album, Regulate...G Funk Era Snoop Dogg and Dr. Dre later recorded a track titled "The Next Episode" for Dre's second studio album, 2001, which is completely different from the original.
- "Doggystyle", featuring Jewell and George Clinton, was recorded during the album sessions but remained unreleased until its inclusion on the compilation album Death Row: The Lost Sessions Vol. 1
- "The Root of All Evil (Outro)", featuring Teena Marie, was recorded during the album sessions but remained unreleased until its inclusion on the compilation album Death Row: The Lost Sessions Vol. 1. There's also a demo version with extra background vocals. The instrumental was later significantly reworked and used for the remix of "California Love", by 2Pac featuring Dr. Dre.
- "Every Single Day", featuring Kurupt, Jewell and Nate Dogg, was recorded during the album sessions, remaining unreleased until an alternate version was released on Tha Dogg Pound compilation album 2002. There's also a version which features Daz Dillinger replacing Snoop Dogg's verses.
- "Niggas Don't Give a Fuck" appears on the Music from the Motion Picture Poetic Justice. There's also two different demo versions.
- "Smoke On", featuring Hug.
- "Big Bitches"
- "Dogg Pound 4 Life (Original version)" An alternate version was released on the Above the Rim: The Soundtrack where Snoop Dogg has a different verse.
- "Fallin' Asleep On Death Row" was recorded during the album sessions but remained unreleased until its inclusion on the compilation album Death Row: The Lost Sessions Vol. 1
- "Poor Young Dave" was recorded during the album sessions but remained unreleased until its inclusion on The Chronic Re-Lit & From The Vault DVD.
- "Eat A Dick" was recorded during the album sessions but remained unreleased until its inclusion on the compilation album Death Row: The Lost Sessions Vol. 1

== Credits and personnel ==
- Dr. Dre – producer, vocals, drum programming, mixing engineer, mastering engineer
- Snoop Doggy Dogg – lead vocals, performer
- Daz Dillinger – producer, drum programming, vocals, performer, additional vocals (tracks 8,10,12,)
- Tha Dogg Pound – performer, vocals
- The Dramatics – performer
- The Lady of Rage – performer, additional vocals
- RBX – performer
- Kurupt – performer
- Nate Dogg – performer, additional vocals
- Warren G – performer, vocals
- Bow Wow – performer (featured)
- George Clinton – performer, additional vocals
- Jewell – performer, additional vocals
- Mr. Malik – performer, additional vocals
- Ricky Harris – performer, additional vocals
- The Queen of Funk – performer (featured)
- The D.O.C. – performer
- Daz Dillinger – additional vocals
- Tha Dogg Pound – additional vocals
- Dr. Dre – additional vocals
- George Clinton – additional vocals
- Jewell – additional vocals
- The Lady of Rage – additional vocals
- Lashann Dendy – additional vocals
- LeShaun – additional vocals
- Mr. Malik – additional vocals
- Nanci Fletcher – additional vocals
- Ricky Harris – additional vocals
- Shana Dee – additional vocals
- Snoop Dogg – additional vocals
- Tony Green – additional vocals
- Warren G – additional vocals
- Suge Knight – executive producer
- Bernie Grundman – mastering engineer
- Chris "The Glove" Taylor – songwriter, mixing engineer
- Ulrich Wild – engineer, recording engineer
- Joe Cool – cover artwork
- Kimberly Holt – art direction, project coordinator
- Kimberly Brown – project coordinator
- Anita Sisaath – video director
- Calvin Caday – video director
- Fab 5 Freddy – video director
- Ricky Harris – video director
- Pamella D’Pella – video location manager
- Dan Winters – photography
- Chi Modu – photography
- Daz Dillinger – producer
- Warren G – producer
- Dr. Dre – producer
- Daz Dillinger – writer
- Dr. Dre – writer
- Warren G – writer
- Belinda Wilson – writer
- Bootsy Collins – writer
- Daniel Webster – writer
- Don Blackman – writer
- Garry Shider – writer
- George Clinton – writer
- Hachidai Nakamura – writer
- Harry Wayne Casey – writer
- Jerome 'Bigfoot' Brailey – writer
- Kurupt – writer
- The Lady of Rage – writer
- Mark Adams – writer
- Mr. Malik – writer
- Mose Davis – writer
- Nanci Fletcher – writer
- Nate Dogg – writer
- Philippe Wynne – writer
- Ray Turner – writer
- Richard "Dimples" Fields – writer
- Richard Finch – writer
- Rokusuke Ei – writer
- Sam Sneed – writer
- Slick Rick – writer
- Snoop Dogg – writer
- Steve Arrington – writer
- Steve Washington – writer
- The D.O.C. – writer
- Warren G – writer
- Publisher : Ain’t Nothin’ Goin’ on but Funkin’, Beane Tribe Publishing, Bridgeport Music, Cotillion Records, EMI Longitude Music, EMI Music Publishing, eOne Music, Kobalt Music, Sony Music Entertainment, Southfield Music, Suge Publishing, Universal Music Group, Warner/Chappell, Warner-Tamerlane Publishing Corp.
- Distributor : Atlantic Records, Death Row Records, Priority Records

== Charts ==
=== Weekly charts ===
Chart (1993–2025)	Peak position
Australian Albums (ARIA)	24
Austrian Albums (Ö3 Austria)	35
Canadian Albums (RPM)	10
Croatian International Albums (HDU)	33
Dutch Albums (Album Top 100)	34
German Albums (Offizielle Top 100)	21
Irish Albums (IRMA)	70
New Zealand Albums (RMNZ)	25
Scottish Albums (Official Charts)	69
Swedish Albums (Sverigetopplistan)	18
Swiss Albums (Schweizer Hitparade)	24
UK Albums (Official Charts)	38
UK Independent Albums (Official Charts)	9
UK R&B Albums (Official Charts)	8
US Billboard 200	1
US Top R&B/Hip-Hop Albums (Billboard)	1
US Vinyl Albums (Billboard)	3

=== Catalog charts ===
Chart (1997–2015)	Peak position
US Top Catalog Albums (Billboard)	7
US R&B/Hip-Hop Catalog Albums (Billboard)	3

=== Year-end charts ===
Chart (1994)	Position
German Albums (Offizielle Top 100)	78
Icelandic Albums (Tónlist)	15
US Billboard 200	3
US Top R&B/Hip Hop Albums (Billboard)	1

Chart (1995)	Position
US Top R&B/Hip Hop Albums (Billboard)	100

Chart (2002)	Position
Canadian R&B Albums (Nielsen SoundScan)	198
Canadian Rap Albums (Nielsen SoundScan)	98

=== Decade-end charts ===
Chart (1990–1999)	Position
US Billboard 200	64

== Certifications ==
Region	Certification	Certified units/sales
Canada (Music Canada)	Platinum	100,000^{^}
France (SNEP)	Gold	100,000^{*}
New Zealand (RMNZ)	Platinum	15,000^{‡}
United Kingdom (BPI)	Platinum	300,000^{^}
United States (RIAA)	4× Platinum	6,957,800
Summaries
Worldwide	—	11,000,000
^{*} Sales figures based on certification alone.^{^} Shipments figures based on certification alone.^{‡} Sales+streaming figures based on certification alone.

== Release history ==
Region	Date	Format(s)	Label	Ref.
United States	November 10, 1993	cassette	Atlantic	
United States	November 23, 1993	CD; LP	Death Row; Interscope	

== See also ==
- List of number-one albums of 1993 (U.S.)
- List of number-one albums of 1994 (U.S.)
- List of number-one R&B albums of 1993 (U.S.)
- List of number-one R&B albums of 1994 (U.S.)
- Billboard Year-End
