= The Don Killuminati: The 7 Day Theory =

1996 studio album by Makaveli

The Don Killuminati: The 7-Day Theory
- The text on the album cover reads, "In no way is this portrait an expression of disrespect for Jesus Christ. – Makaveli"

Studio album by Makaveli
- Released: November 5, 1996
- Recorded: June 7 – August 12, 1996
- Studios: Can-Am Studios (Tarzana, Los Angeles); Ameraycan (North Hollywood)
- Genre: Hip-hop
- Length: 59:05
- Labels: Death Row; Makaveli; Interscope
- Producers: Simon (exec.); Darryl "Big D" Harper; Hurt-M-Badd; Reggie Moore; Dametrius Ship; QDIII

Makaveli chronology
All Eyez on Me (1996)	The Don Killuminati: The 7-Day Theory (1996)	R U Still Down? (Remember Me) (1997)

Singles from Killuminati: The 7 Day Theory
- 1. "Toss It Up" Released: September 26, 1996; 2. "To Live & Die in L.A." Released: November 16, 1996; 3. "Hail Mary" Released: February 11, 1997

The Don Killuminati: The 7-Day Theory (commonly shortened to Makaveli, Killuminati, or The 7-Day Theory) is the fifth studio album by American rapper Tupac Shakur, his first posthumous album and the last released with his creative input. Recorded in July and August 1996, it was released on November 5, 1996, almost two months after his death, under the stage name of Makaveli, by Death Row Records, Tupac's Makaveli Records, and Interscope Records.

It is his only album released under the alternative stage name and features guest appearances from his rap group Outlawz and rapper Bad Azz, as well as R&B singers Aaron Hall, Danny Boy, K-Ci and JoJo, Val Young, and Tyrone Wrice, along with uncredited vocal contributions from reggae musician Prince Ital Joe. Originally intended as a mixtape and preceded by the release of "Toss It Up" as the lead single, the album debuted at number one on the Billboard 200 and sold 664,000 copies within its first week of release.

By 1999, it was certified four times platinum by the RIAA. "To Live & Die in L.A." and "Hail Mary" were released later as singles and both garnered praise as standout tracks from the album, particularly the latter. None of its singles charted within the Billboard Hot 100, but all charted within the top twenty of UK Singles chart. The album was originally set to be released in March 1997, but because of Tupac’s death, it was released four months early. The album received widespread critical acclaim, with praise for the emotion displayed by Shakur, the production, album cover, and themes. It was ranked by critics as one of the greatest hip hop albums, as well as one of the greatest albums of all time.

== Recording ==
Killuminati: The 7-Day Theory was completely finished in seven days during the first week of August 1996. These are some of the last songs Shakur recorded before he was shot on September 7, 1996. The album's preliminary title was "The 3-Day Theory" and it originally consisted of around 14 tracks. In a 2014 interview, E.D.I. Mean of the Outlawz rap group and Ronald "Riskie" Brent revealed that the official name of the album was mixed up in the rush to release the album following Tupac's death. Tupac wanted the album to be called Killuminati: The 7-Day Theory, with Makaveli the Don as the artist name. However, the album went through numerous changes. The liner notes on August 12th show the track list used for the final album as well as a name change to Killuminati: The 7-Day Theory. George "Papa G" Pryce, former head of publicity for Death Row, claimed that "Makaveli, which we did was a sort of tongue-in-cheek, and it was not ready to come out, [but] after Tupac was murdered, it did come out... Before that, it was going to be a sort of an underground [release]."

Many of Shakur's usual in-house producers, most notably Johnny J, were not involved with the project. The only producer with whom Shakur had worked prior to this album was QD3, the son of Quincy Jones and half-brother of Kidada Jones, Shakur's girlfriend. Shakur also co-produces four tracks on the album. The other two producers were Hurt-M-Badd and Darryl "Big D" Harper. E.D.I. Mean of the Outlawz recalls: "At the time Hurt-M-Badd, who was just an up-and-coming producer at Death Row, and Darryl Harper, who was an R&B producer – Suge had him working on all the R&B projects – they had a green room up in Can-Am [Studios], which everybody around Death Row called the wack room because they said 'Ain't nothing but wack shit come out of there.' But we was up in the studio one day and we trying to get music done – ain't none of us producers – we see them two niggas in the 'Wack room' and 'Pac like, 'Go get them niggas.' So niggas go bring them, 'Pac just putting niggas to work like, 'I need a beat here, I need y'all to do this, do that.' And these are niggas that nobody at Death Row was fucking with. They'll tell you themselves."

The album was recorded at Can-Am Studios in Tarzana during July and August 1996. During those weeks, 21 songs were completed with only 12 of them making the final track listing. The album’s guest features were also toned down dramatically, as the album did not feature the star-studded guest list that All Eyez on Me did. Most of the guest verses are supplied by Shakur's Outlawz rap group. The only verse that was not from one of the Outlawz was from Bad Azz, a member of the LBC Crew, while the album also features vocals from Death Row R&B singer Danny Boy, Aaron Hall, Val Young and multi-platinum R&B duo K-Ci & JoJo. Credited as Tyrone Wrice, Hurt-M-Badd, a rapper, singer and the lead producer for the album, provided vocals for "Hold Ya Head"'s hook. Young Noble of the Outlawz recalled: "We had started writing the shit and we was taking long. 'Pac was like, 'Who got something? Bad Azz you got something?' and it fit perfect, so it was meant for Bad Azz to be on that song. We had already been on a million 'Pac songs. That was his way of motivating us like, 'If y'all ain't ready, then you don't make the song.'"

== Tracks ==
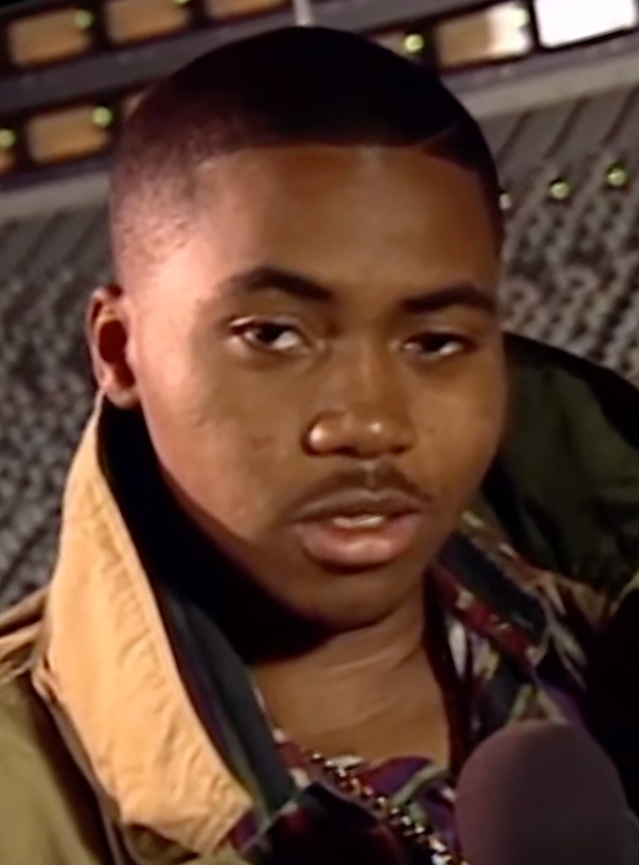
The song "Me and My Girlfriend" was inspired by the rapper Nas' song, "I Gave You Power".

While All Eyez on Me was considered by Shakur "a celebration of life", Killuminati: The 7-Day Theory is much darker and more complex. Shakur's rapping is still emotional, but is intensified throughout. Some songs on the album contain both subtle and direct insults to Shakur's rivals at the height of the East Coast–West Coast feud. "Bomb First (My Second Reply)" contains disses toward Bad Boy Records, Jay-Z, Mobb Deep, Nas and Xzibit. "Toss It Up" contains disses towards Shakur's former Death Row label-mate Dr. Dre and subliminals toward Teddy Riley. "To Live & Die in L.A." also disses Dr. Dre at the end of the song.

"Against All Odds"
"Against All Odds" stands out as one of the most controversial songs from the album, dissing rappers including Nas, Dr. Dre, and Mobb Deep by namedropping.

The track "Against All Odds" contains disses toward Nas, Dr. Dre, Mobb Deep, Puff Daddy, Kool G Rap, De La Soul, as well as New York hip hop executives Jimmy "Henchman" Rosemond, Jacques "Haitian Jack" Agnant, and Walter "King Tut" Johnson, who were accused of being associates of Puff Daddy and Bad Boy Records in orchestrating the 1994 Quad Studio assault.

Although Shakur insulted Nas on "Intro/Bomb First (My Second Reply)" and "Against All Odds", rapper Young Noble, who appeared on several songs on The 7-Day Theory, stated in an interview that Nas's "I Gave You Power" was the main inspiration for Shakur's "Me and My Girlfriend". Shakur and Nas squashed their beef at the 1996 MTV Video Music Awards days before Shakur was murdered. They were scheduled to meet in Las Vegas but never had the chance. Death Row associate Kurt "Kobane" Couthon revealed in an interview in 2016 that Shakur was listening to Nas's It Was Written the day he was murdered, during his drive to Las Vegas.

"Watch Ya Mouth" is another diss song that was supposed to be on the album but got cut and still remains unreleased, but it has been leaked online. It contains disses toward Dr. Dre, Nas, Biggie, Puffy, De La Soul, and Wendy Williams.

== Singles ==
The first two singles, "Toss It Up" and "To Live & Die in L.A", were released on September 26 and November 16, 1996, respectively. Dr. Dre's former Death Row colleagues, including Shakur, recorded and attempted to release "Toss It Up", containing numerous insults aimed at Dr. Dre, and using a deliberately similar instrumental to Dre's production on "No Diggity" by Blackstreet, but were forced to replace the production after Blackstreet issued the label with a cease and desist order stopping them from distributing the song. The "Toss It Up" music video features Shakur, Danny Boy, K-Ci & JoJo, and Aaron Hall, and was directed by Lionel C. Martin. According to Death Row Records, it was the last music video Shakur filmed. The video also includes an appearance from actress LisaRaye McCoy. An unreleased version of the video was leaked some years later and is known as the "Toss It Up Beach Version".

"To Live & Die in L.A" was produced by QDIII, who was the only outside Death Row producer on the album besides Demetrius Shipp, the producer of "Toss It Up". QDIII was one of Shakur's favorite producers. QDIII told XXL Magazine:

I was in the studio with 'Pac, I had some records with me, and there was this old song that I played for him to see if he liked the vibe. He felt it and told me to go home and hook up a beat like that. I went home and hooked it up as fast as I could, and I think I came back the same night and he listened to the track three times, and in like 15 minutes he was already done with his lyrics. He went in the booth without telling anyone what the track was about he just laid it in one take – over about three tracks. Then he told Val Young what the concept was, and she went in and laid her chorus vocal in one take, too. After the vocals were done, 'Pac had Ricky Rouse [Makaveli musician] replace my keyboard bass and guitar parts with live bass and guitar parts, and the song was done – less than two hours total. This song just flowed out of everyone that was a part of it. No one thought twice no one doubted anything. It was full speed ahead until it was done – as if it was guided or meant to be. Ever since recording like that, without thinking twice like that, I have changed the way I look at making music.

A music video for "To Live & Die in L.A" was shot in July 1996. It features Shakur working at a fruit stand and driving around Los Angeles in a car filled with women, and also features various scenes and pictures of notable places and events in Los Angeles. It was the first video shot for the album. The album's final single, "Hail Mary" was released on February 11, 1997. The videos for "Hail Mary" and "To Live & Die in L.A can be found on the DualDisc of Killuminati: The 7-Day Theory.

== Packaging ==
The album cover for Killuminati was done by Compton based artist Ronald "Riskie" Brent, known artistically as "Riskie Forever." According to Riskie, Death Row Records C.E.O Marion "Suge" Knight introduced Riskie to Tupac on the set of the California Love (Remix) video shoot in Compton, California. Riskie, while in Tupac's trailer showed him his art portfolio, impressing Tupac with his artwork. Upon seeing his artwork Tupac agreed that Riskie had good artistic talent and requested for Riskie to do his next album cover. Riskie received a phone call from the then President of Death Row Norris Anderson with Tupac's request that he be drawn on a cross for his next album cover.

The Killuminati album cover draws on Renaissance portrayals of the crucifixion of Jesus Christ. Tupac is by himself in the image with his head tilted to the side, possessing the classic wound in his right side similar to the wound of Jesus as depicted in the accounts of his crucifixion. There is a bandana covering the head of Tupac and barbed-wire covering both his hands and his feet. Absent from the painting is Tupac's iconic "Thug Life" tattoo as it is covered up by the parental advisory sticker. On the cross of Tupac there is a map connecting various cities from across the country. The cities listed have large African-American populations, including the major urban centers of the East, West, and Southern parts of the United States. The color pattern of the cultural production is a gloomy red and black. The only light in the artistry is the moon and the few beams of light that emerge from the cracks on the cross, which may represent bullet holes and the Five Holy Wounds. Near the bottom of the image is a written disclaimer: "In no way is this portrait an expression of disrespect for Jesus Christ. —Makaveli"

There are many interpretations of this album cover, the primary theme communicates that through depiction, Tupac is highlighting what he perceives to be his being vilified by the media and his enemies and left alone to suffer his fate. The parental advisor sticker could be a reference to both what he perceived to be his demonization due to his promiscuous lifestyle, but also and most importantly, it could be a reference to his conviction of sexual assault, a charge for which he viciously maintained his innocence. The names of the cities that are on the album cover may be a representation of Tupac's belief that he represents the entirety of the African-American community in his public vilification, that he, like African-American people as a whole, is on display to be gazed upon and judged through the Euro-American racial prism. Furthermore, this theme of representation is also connected to the political commitments of Tupac Shakur as he was in the midst of deepening his political activity in the form of the creation of a Hip-Hop political party prior to his murder.

== Tupac's pseudonym Makaveli ==
Tupac read Niccolò Machiavelli's The Prince while in prison recovering from an attempt on his life in November 1994. He was so inspired that once released from prison he changed his stage name to a pseudonym derived from Niccolò Machiavelli; "Makaveli", stating: "Like, Machiavelli. My name is not Machiavelli. My name is Makaveli. I took it, that's mine. He gave me that. And I don't feel no guilt. That's what got me here, My reading. It's not like I idolize this one guy Machiavelli. I idolize that type of thinking where you do whatever's gonna make you achieve your goal."

== Commercial performance ==
Killuminati: The 7-Day Theory debuted at number one on both the US Billboard 200 and the US Top R&B/Hip-Hop Albums charts on November 23, 1996, selling 664,000 copies in its first week. The album was certified 2× platinum on January 10, 1997, 3× platinum on April 16, 1997, and 4× platinum on June 15, 1999.

== Critical reception ==
Professional ratings
Review scores
Source	Rating
AllMusic	2.5/5 stars
Encyclopedia of Popular Music	2/5 stars
Entertainment Weekly	D
Los Angeles Times	3/4 stars
MVRemix Urban	9/10
Muzik	5/5 stars
RapReviews	7.5/10
Rolling Stone	3/5 stars
XXL	5/5

Upon release, Killuminati: The 7-Day Theory polarized critics and received mixed reviews, but it has retrospectively been met with widespread critical acclaim. Muzik called the record one of the year's most important and noted that it "perfectly captures the dark tensions arising from the centre of the vicious heat that is the City of Angels". XXL awarded the album a perfect five-star rating. The Source, the leading hip hop magazine in the United States, has called the record better than Shakur's critically acclaimed All Eyez on Me album. Critic Cheo H. Coker of the Los Angeles Times saw "power and poignancy" in Killuminati, but noted that it lacks the epic scope of Shakur's previous Me Against the World and All Eyez on Me albums. "It's in those albums – and songs such as "Brenda's Got a Baby", "Lord Knows" and "Only God Can Judge Me" – that the legacy of this tortured, talented artist will be best found".

Richard Harrington of the Washington Post felt that "Shakur's voice sounds like blood boiling at times". "It would be easy to dismiss all this as rapper braggadoccio", he concluded his review, "but the heartfelt rage and aggression and Shakur's fate -- he was gunned down two months ago at the age of 25 -- suggest this music is dead serious".

In a more critical review, writing for the New York Times, Neil Strauss singled out "Hail Mary" and "Krazy" as the album's standout tracks and praised its dark tone, but noted that both Killuminati and Snoop Dogg's Tha Doggfather suffer from Dr. Dre's departure from Death Row and that the album is inferior to All Eyez on Me. "This one was clearly meant as filler, a way to burn off creative energy, put down his rivals at Bad Boy Entertainment and tide fans over until the next album". While praising the production and Shakur's vocals, Rolling Stone felt the album had nothing to offer lyrically. "The tracks are fat with funky menace and the choral-vocal effect in many of the raps has a street-corner, pass-the-bottle charge. Alas, the record – issued just two months after 2Pac's murder – merely perpetuates Los Angeles hip-hop gangland stereotypes, in particular the East Coast/West Coast feud that has gone beyond pointless all the way to deadly."

Some reviewers commented negatively on the album. AllMusic's Stephen Thomas Erlewine gave the album 2.5 stars out of 5. "Everything about Killuminati: The 7-Day Theory smacks of exploitation..." he observed. "Released only eight weeks after Tupac Shakur died from gunshot wounds, Death Row released this posthumous album under the name of Makaveli, a pseudonym derived from the Italian politician Niccolò Machiavelli, who advocated using deception and fear on one's enemies. Naturally, the appearance of Killuminati so shortly after Tupac's death led many conspiracy theorists to surmise the rapper was still alive, but it was all part of a calculated marketing strategy by Death Row – the label needed something to sustain interest in the album, since the music here is so shoddy." He also condemned the record for concentrating on "nothing but tired G-funk beats and back-biting East Coast-West Coast rivalries". In a negative review from People, the magazine commented by saying: "In light of how he died, all the bloodletting seems both preordained and sad. At the same time, Killuminati may be seen as Tupac's last grand artistic statement. Quite frankly, the CD is not that good."

=== Legacy with rappers ===
The emotion, anger, and eerie nature showcased on the album has been admired by a large part of the hip-hop community,including other rappers. "There are a lot of 2Pac records I like," said 50 Cent, "but this is consistent all the way through. You could put this on and clean your whole house." Rapper J. Cole named it his favorite album of all time, he commented on the album saying, "Collectively, from 'Hail Mary' to 'Krazy' to 'Against All Odds,' it's deep. This album gets better for me as time goes on. Me Against the World is like that too, but Makaveli is really the one where the older I get, the more of it I get. Every year that I get older, I hear this album differently. I know more about life, so I'm like, 'Oh shit, this is what he meant.' So Makaveli is super special."

== Track listing ==
Credits adapted from album booklet.

No.	Title	Writer(s)	Producer(s)	Length
1.	"Bomb First (My Second Reply)" (featuring E.D.I. and Young Noble)	Tupac Shakur; Malcolm Greenridge; Rufus Cooper III	Darryl "Big D" Harper	4:57
2.	"Hail Mary" (featuring Outlawz)	Shakur; Cooper III; Katari Cox; Yafeu Fula; Tyrone Wrice; Joe Paquette; Bruce Washington	Hurt-M-Badd	5:10
3.	"Toss It Up" (featuring Aaron Hall, Danny Boy, K-Ci & JoJo)	Shakur; Aaron Hall; Daniel Steward; Cedric Hailey; Jo Jo Hailey	Dametrius Ship; Reggie Moore	5:06
4.	"To Live & Die in L.A." (featuring Val Young)	Shakur; Valaria Young	QDIII	4:33
5.	"Blasphemy"	Shakur	Hurt-M-Badd	4:38
6.	"Life of an Outlaw" (featuring Outlawz)	Shakur; Greenridge; Cox; Cooper III; Mutah Beale	Makaveli; Darryl "Big D" Harper	4:56
7.	"Just Like Daddy" (featuring Outlawz)	Shakur; Yafeu Fula; Malcolm Greenidge; Rufus Cooper III	Hurt-M-Badd	5:07
8.	"Krazy" (featuring Bad Azz)	Shakur; Harper; Jamarr Stamps	Darryl "Big D" Harper	5:16
9.	"White Man'z World"	Shakur; Harper	Darryl "Big D" Harper	5:38
10.	"Me and My Girlfriend"	Shakur	Makaveli; Darryl "Big D" Harper; Hurt-M-Badd	5:08
11.	"Hold Ya Head" (featuring Hurt-M-Badd)	Shakur; Wrice	Hurt-M-Badd	3:59
12.	"Against All Odds"	Shakur; Wrice	Hurt-M-Badd; Makaveli (Co.)	4:37
Total length:				59:05

Notes

- ^{^a} signifies a co-producer
- "Hail Mary" features vocals by Prince Ital Joe
- The guest verses by Aaron Hall, Danny Boy, K-Ci & JoJo in "Toss It Up" are all uncredited
- "Blasphemy" features vocals by Prince Ital Joe & JMJ
- "Life of an Outlaw" features vocals by Bo-Roc
- "Me and My Girlfriend" features vocals by Virginya Slim
- Hurt-M-Badd, whose vocals are featured in "Hold Ya Head", is credited as Tyrone Wrice

=== Unused tracks ===
- "Killuminati" – Later released on The Outlawz' Still I Rise.
- "Friendz" – Later released on Death Row's Too Gangsta for Radio and 2Pac's Until the End of Time.
- "Lost Souls" – Later released on Gang Related – The Soundtrack.
- "Ain’t Nothing Wrong (Playa'z Praya)" – Unreleased, but available on the internet.
- "Watch Ya Mouth" – Unreleased, but available on the internet.
- "Let 'Em Have It" – Later released on 2Pac's Until the End of Time.
- "Niggaz Nature" – Later released on 2Pac's Until the End of Time.
- "Black Jesuz" – Later released on The Outlawz' Still I Rise.
- "When Thug'z Cry" – Later released on 2Pac's Until the End of Time.
- "Hidden Track" - Unreleased, but available on the internet.

=== Other songs recorded during the sessions ===
- "The Good Die Young" – Later released on The Outlawz' Still I Rise.
- "Street Fame II" – Later released on 2Pac's Better Dayz.
- "Pac's Life" – Later released on 2Pac's Pac's Life.

== Personnel ==
Credits for Killuminati: The 7 Day of Theory adapted from AllMusic.

- 2Pac / Makaveli – primary artist, producer, executive producer
- Suge Knight / Simon – executive producer
- Tommy D. Daugherty – chief engineer, mixing, additional production
- Lance Pierre – engineer, mixing, additional production
- Justin Isham – digital editing
- Ronald "Riskie" Brent – paintings
- Yaki Kadafi – featured artist
- Hussein Fatal – featured artist
- Kastro – featured artist
- Napoleon – featured artist
- E.D.I. – featured artist
- Young Noble – featured artist
- Cedric "K-Ci" Hailey – featured artist
- Joel "JoJo" Hailey – featured artist
- Aaron Hall – featured artist
- Danny Boy – featured artist
- Val Young – featured artist
- Bad Azz – featured artist
- Outlawz – featured artist
- Hurt-M-Badd – producer/featured artist
- Darryl Harper – producer
- Reggie Moore – producer
- Demetrius Shipp – mixing, producer
- Troy Staton – mixing, producer
- Guy Snider – engineer, track engineer
- Scott Gutierrez – associate engineer
- John Morris – associate engineer
- Don Smartt – associate engineer

== Charts ==
=== Weekly charts ===
Chart (1996–1997)	Peak position
Australian Albums (ARIA)	37
Canada Top Albums/CDs (RPM)	25
Dutch Albums (Album Top 100)	61
German Albums (Offizielle Top 100)	76
New Zealand Albums (RMNZ)	17
Swedish Albums (Sverigetopplistan)	28
UK Albums (Official Charts)	53
UK Independent Albums (Official Charts)	22
UK R&B Albums (Official Charts)	9
US Billboard 200	1
US Top R&B/Hip-Hop Albums (Billboard)	1

Chart (2001)	Peak position
US Catalog Albums (Billboard)	24

Chart (2019)	Peak position
Greatest of All Time Top R&B/Hip-Hop Albums (Billboard)	81

=== Year-end charts ===
Chart (1996)	Position
US Billboard 200	60
US Top R&B/Hip-Hop Albums (Billboard)	8

Chart (1997)	Position
US Billboard 200	15
US Top R&B/Hip-Hop Albums (Billboard)	3

== Certifications ==
Region	Certification	Certified units/sales
Canada (Music Canada)	Gold	50,000^{^}
United Kingdom (BPI)	Gold	100,000^{‡}
United States (RIAA)	4× Platinum	4,000,000^{^}
^{^} Shipments figures based on certification alone.^{‡} Sales+streaming figures based on certification alone.

== See also ==
- List of number-one albums of 1996 (U.S.)
- List of number-one R&B albums of 1996 (U.S.)
- List of number-one R&B albums of 1997 (U.S.)
