= Hail Mary (2Pac song) =

1997 single by Makaveli featuring Outlawz

Single by Makaveli featuring Outlawz

from the album The Don Killuminati: The 7 Day Theory
- B-side: "Life of an Outlaw"
- Released: February 11, 1997
- Recorded: July 8, 1996
- Studio: Can-Am Studios (Los Angeles, California)
- Genre: Horrorcore
- Length: 5:09
- Label: Death Row; Interscope
- Songwriters: Tupac Shakur; Rufus Cooper; Katari Cox
- Producer: Hurt-M-Badd

Makaveli singles chronology
"To Live & Die in L.A." (1996)	"Hail Mary" (1997)	"Smile" (1997)

Music video
- "Hail Mary" on YouTube

"Hail Mary" is a song by American rapper Tupac Shakur from his fifth studio album, The Don Killuminati: The 7 Day Theory (1996). It was released after his September 1996 murder under the Makaveli stage name as the album's third single. "Hail Mary" features rap verses by Kastro, Young Noble and Yaki Kadafi of the Outlawz rap group and vocals from reggae musician Prince Ital Joe. A music video was shot for the song and can be found on the DualDisc of The Don Killuminati: The 7 Day Theory.

The song captures Tupac zoning out the violence and negativity surrounding him praying to God, and making biblical references. "Hail Mary" appeared on Shakur's Greatest Hits in 1998. A remix of the song was also featured on the album Nu-Mixx Klazzics in 2003. The song debuted on the Billboard charts on January 4, 1997 and peaked at number twelve on the R&B/Hip-Hop Airplay chart on March 8, 1997.

== Production ==
"Hail Mary" took under one hour to complete. It took about 15 minutes to write and about five minutes to lay. Hurt-M-Badd made the beat in 20 to 30 minutes. "Outlawz on a paper chase, can you relate?..." was originally going to be the hook, but then Shakur suggested putting it in the end.

== Music video ==
The music video was released on March 16, 1997. It shows a fictionalized version of a unseen Tupac coming back as a ghost and getting revenge on the gang members who killed him.

== Charts ==
=== Weekly charts ===
Chart (1997–1998)	Peak position
Scottish Singles Sales (Official Charts)	81
UK Hip Hop/R&B (Official Charts)	13
UK Singles (Official Charts)	43
US R&B/Hip-Hop Airplay (Billboard)	12

== Certifications ==
Region	Certification	Certified units/sales
New Zealand (RMNZ)	Platinum	30,000^{‡}
United Kingdom (BPI)	Gold	400,000^{‡}
^{‡} Sales+streaming figures based on certification alone.

== Live performances ==
This song was played as a tribute to Shakur during the Up in Smoke Tour in 2000. Rappers Dr. Dre and Snoop Dogg rapped this song as one of three songs they performed as a tribute to 2Pac with the crowd singing the chorus.

On April 15, 2012, "Hail Mary" was performed as the opening of the Shakur's hologram performance alongside live performers Dr. Dre and Snoop Dogg at the Coachella Valley Music and Arts Festival. The track moved 13,000 downloads that week for a 1,530% sales increase.

== In popular culture ==
The song was played in the film Baby Boy, in which Shakur himself was supposed to play the lead. The film was released in 2001 by John Singleton, but because Shakur was no longer alive, Singleton had him replaced by Tyrese Gibson. The song was played when Jody, the lead, had a dream about being gunned down by the police or being locked up in prison with his girlfriend and son visiting him. While the song is playing, 2Pac's picture is seen in Jody's room.

The 2015 film Straight Outta Compton shows Shakur recording the song in a scene which takes place in 1995, one year before it was released. However, this never happened in real life, as Dr. Dre left Death Row Records before the actual song itself was recorded.

It was played in the 2015 boxing film Creed, as the entrance music to Donnie Creed (Michael B. Jordan), Apollo Creed's son, during his final match within the film.

It was played in 2Pac's biopic, All Eyez on Me (2017) where he performs the song at The House of Blues in July 1996. However, this scene never happened in real life.

== Remix ==
"Hail Mary"

Song by Eminem, 50 Cent and Busta Rhymes

from the album Invasion Part II: Conspiracy Theory
- Released: 2003
- Genre: Hip-hop
- Length: 4:51
- Songwriters: Marshall Mathers; Curtis Jackson; Trevor Smith
- Producer: Hurt-M-Badd

In 2003, American rappers Eminem, 50 Cent and Busta Rhymes made a remix of "Hail Mary", which is commonly referred to as "Hail Mary 2003". The song was a diss track aimed towards Ja Rule. The song was included on DJ Green Lantern's mixtape Invasion Part II: Conspiracy Theory (2003).

=== Background ===
In Ja Rule's 2001 album Pain Is Love, he compared himself to and impersonated Shakur on many songs, including the song "So Much Pain", sampling Tupac's "Pain" from Above the Rim. Soon after the release of The Last Temptation, 50 Cent started beefing with Ja Rule, just before signing to Shady and Aftermath. After agreeing to the record deal, Ja Rule began threatening 50 Cent and Eminem that if any disses were released, he would respond. 50 Cent released the Ja Rule diss track "Back Down", from his debut album Get Rich or Die Tryin'. Because the song was produced by Dr. Dre, Ja Rule dissed Dr. Dre, 50 Cent and Eminem. The three of them (and associates) started dissing Ja Rule. Busta Rhymes planned to be neutral in the feud, but due to him being signed to Aftermath, Ja Rule dissed him.

=== Composition and lyrics ===
The song starts off with an intro containing a line saying "Makaveli rest in peace" and many lines attacking Ja Rule and Murder Inc. owner Irv Gotti. The chorus is delivered by Eminem, with the first verse being performed by him. The second verse is sung by 50 Cent and the last verse by Busta Rhymes. Throughout the song, there are references to Tupac's songs and attacks towards Murder Inc. Records.

=== Aftermath ===
Ja Rule responded with the song "Loose Change", calling Dr. Dre "bisexual", naming Eminem "Feminem" and said Suge Knight knew of Dre "bringing transvestites home". The song also included lines towards Eminem's family, including his daughter Hailie Jade. He, as well as Obie Trice and D12, responded with "Doe Rae Me". "Hail Mary" is widely acclaimed as the pioneering "drill song," marking a significant milestone in the evolution of drill music. Its innovative sound and lyrical style have garnered recognition within the genre, solidifying its place in the history of drill music as a groundbreaking track.

=== Charts ===
Weekly chart performance for Hail Mary 2003
Chart (2003)	Peak position
US Hot Rap Songs (Billboard)	18
US Hot R&B/Hip-Hop Songs (Billboard)	33
US Rhythmic Airplay (Billboard)	39
