= Gin and Juice =

1994 single by Snoop Doggy Dogg

Single by Snoop Doggy Dogg

from the album Doggystyle
- Released: January 18, 1994
- Genre: G-funk
- Length: 3:31
- Label: Death Row; Interscope
- Songwriters: Cordozar Broadus; Andre Young; Harry Wayne Casey; Richard Finch; Steve Arrington; Mark Adams; Ray Turner; Steve Washington; Daniel Webster; David Ruffin Jr. (uncredited)
- Producer: Dr. Dre

Snoop Doggy Dogg singles chronology
"Who Am I? (What's My Name?)" (1993)	"Gin and Juice" (1994)	"Doggy Dogg World" (1994)

Music video
- "Gin and Juice" on YouTube

"Gin and Juice" is a song by American rapper Snoop Doggy Dogg. It was released on January 18, 1994, by Death Row and Interscope Records as the second single from his debut album, Doggystyle (1993). The song was produced by Dr. Dre and contains an interpolation from Slave's "Watching You" in its chorus and a sample from "I Get Lifted" by George McCrae. Tony Green created its bassline; additional vocalists on the song include Dat Nigga Daz, Jewell, Heney Loc, and Sean "Barney" Thomas. "Gin and Juice" peaked at number eight on the Billboard Hot 100 in the United States. It earned a gold certification from the RIAA and sold 700,000 copies. The accompanying music video features a parody of the 1990 movie Home Alone.

"Gin and Juice" was nominated for the Grammy Award for Best Rap Solo Performance at the 37th Annual Grammy Awards. It was listed as number eight on VH1's "100 Greatest Hip-Hop Songs".

== Critical reception ==
Larry Flick from Billboard magazine complimented the song as "yet another of the Dogg's wildly infectious funk/pop gems." He explained, "Taken from his monstrous Doggystyle debut, track combines a danceable rhythm section with a sing-along chorus and verses that are full of self-promoting posture—but wisely tempered with a sense of humor. No doubt about it, this is a ready-made pop and urban hit." Andy Beevers from Music Week gave it four out of five, stating that "this laidback, funky rap track should follow 'What's My Name' into the Top 40." Pan-European magazine Music & Media commented, "By now everybody knows his name. Maybe it's the alcohol, but this track is pretty sedative. On a 100% hypnotising bass line "Snoopy '94" is sniffing in the streets. Woof woof!"

Stephen Dalton from NME wrote, "The Snoopster slopes back with a slinky low-rider of a groove and a spliffed-up wibbly-wobbly rap about smooching down the boulevard sipping happy juice in the sunshine. Slow, low beats and cheesy disco synth effects give a Parliament-style space-funk vibe, and Mr Dogg is obviously a cool drink of water on a hot afternoon, but his chilled-out musings are hardly a patch on Ice Cube's ultra-laid-back gangsta anthem 'It Was a Good Day'." James Hamilton from the Record Mirror Dance Update named it a "languidly drawled sinuous 94.5bpm mellow "laid back" swayer" in his weekly dance column.

== Lyrics ==
The lyrics depict a party filled with sex, marijuana, and alcohol (including the aforementioned gin and juice) continuing into the small hours of the morning. The chorus is sung by David Ruffin Jr. (D-Ruff), the son of former Temptations member David Ruffin:

Rollin' down the street smokin' indo
Sippin' on gin and juice
Laid back (with my mind on my money and my money on my mind).

One critic describes the chorus as representative of "the G-funk tableau" emphasizing cruising culture, consumption of depressants, and materialism. The last line is an example of antimetabole, a figure of speech in which two or more clauses are related to each other through a reversal of structures. The focus on money is shared throughout hip-hop, including It's All About the Benjamins, Money Makes the World Go Round, Get Money, and Foe tha Love of $.

== Music video ==
The song's music video features a parody of the movie Home Alone called "Home Boy Alone" where a teenaged Snoop Dogg is left to do chores and take care of the house when his parents leave, and is instructed not to throw any wild parties. After he disobeys, his parents return home angry and evict the partygoers to confront Snoop Dogg. Ricky Harris plays Snoop's father, and Dr. Dre, Warren G, Nate Dogg, Big Mike and Daz Dillinger make cameo appearances. Six-year-old rapper Lil Bow Wow plays Snoop's little brother who is jumping on the couch in the intro. "I was in the 'Gin and Juice' video," comedian Eddie Griffin recalled. "I pop out of this little Volkswagen full of weed smoke with my hair standing on end."

== Live performances ==
Snoop performed the song live at the American Music Awards of 1994 on February 7, 1994, and on Saturday Night Live on March 19, 1994.

== Track listing ==
- 12-inch single
1. "Gin and Juice" (radio version—no indo)
2. "Gin and Juice" (radio version)
3. "Gin and Juice" (Laid Back remix)
4. "Gin and Juice" (Laid Back radio mix)

== Charts ==
=== Weekly charts ===
Chart (1994)	Peak position
Australia (ARIA)	49
Europe (European Dance Radio)	3
New Zealand (Recorded Music NZ)	11
UK Singles (Official Charts)	39
UK Dance (Music Week)	17
UK Club Chart (Music Week)	82
US Billboard Hot 100	8
US Hot Dance Singles Sales (Billboard)	1
US Hot R&B/Hip-Hop Songs (Billboard)	13
US Hot Rap Songs (Billboard)	1
US Rhythmic Airplay (Billboard)	5

=== Year-end charts ===
Chart (1994)	Position
US Billboard Hot 100	52
US Hot R&B Singles (Billboard)	73
US Hot Rap Singles (Billboard)	8
US Maxi-Singles Sales (Billboard)	24

== Certifications ==
Region	Certification	Certified units/sales
New Zealand (RMNZ)	3× Platinum	90,000^{‡}
United Kingdom (BPI)	Gold	400,000^{‡}
United States (RIAA)	Gold	700,000
^{‡} Sales+streaming figures based on certification alone.

== Release history ==
Region	Date	Format(s)	Label(s)	Ref.
United States	January 18, 1994	12-inch vinyl; cassette	Death Row; Interscope	
United Kingdom	January 31, 1994	12-inch vinyl; CD; cassette	Death Row; Interscope	
Australia	March 28, 1994	CD; cassette	Death Row; Interscope	

== Merchandising, retail, and promotions ==
In February 2024, Snoop and Dr. Dre launched a line of drinks called Gin & Juice. The first four flavors were apricot, citrus, melon, and passionfruit. Southern Glazer's Wine and Spirits handled distribution. The concept, packaging, and graphic identity for the new brand was designed by Ini Archibong, with illustrations by Wayne Johnson.

== See also ==
- List of Billboard Hot 100 top 10 singles in 1994
- Paradise (cocktail)
