= Ain't No Fun (If the Homies Can't Have None) =

Song by Snoop Doggy Dogg featuring Nate Dogg, Warren G and Kurupt

from the album Doggystyle
- Released: April 1994
- Genre: West Coast hip-hop; G-funk
- Length: 4:06
- Label: Death Row; Interscope; Atlantic
- Songwriters: Calvin Broadus Jr.; Andre Young; Ricardo Brown; Nathaniel Hale; Warren Griffin III
- Producer: Dr. Dre

"Ain't No Fun (If the Homies Can't Have None)" is a song by American rapper Snoop Doggy Dogg from his debut studio album Doggystyle (1993). It features American rappers Nate Dogg, Warren G and Kurupt. The song was produced by Dr. Dre.

== Background ==
In an interview with DubCNN in July 2006, Snoop Dogg said that Daz Dillinger and Warren G brought Dr. Dre the beat but "Dre took that muthafucka to the next level!" In an interview with Tidal in 2016, Warren G gave some background information on the song: "We had a lot of women and they was with it, too. Shit. We was having fun — it was protected. They'd have a bunch of their friends and we'd have a bunch of our guys and we'd just... fuck!

In 2013, Suge Knight indicated in an interview with Rolling Stone that the song was created by a member of the Mad Swan Bloods, adding that "all them dudes already had a record done. And they came and played it for us in the studio. They played us the demo. Everybody looked at it like it was alright. And then after they left, shit, everybody was chopping that same beat."

== Composition ==
The song incorporates funk elements and melodic singing from Nate Dogg, who sings the chorus. The lyrics revolve around having sexual intercourse with women; Kurupt notably raps, "If Kurupt gave a fuck about a bitch, I'd always be broke / I'd never have no motherfucking indo to smoke."

== Critical reception ==
Christopher John Farley of Time mentioned the song as among the tracks from Doggystyle that are "perfectly crafted to come booming out of Jeeps and college dorms". Alan Jones of Music Week regarded the song as "superb" and wrote "Inevitably, its lyrics are wholly unsuitable for radio. It is bound to excite extreme reactions, with enough of those of the positive variety to ensure it will be a success." Reviewing Doggystyle for Entertainment Weekly, David Browne had a disapproving reaction to the song, stating "Sure, it's a swinging, hard-thumping piece of R&B craft that easily outstrips anything new jack crooner Keith Sweat has offered lately, but it also touts gang-banging as a male-bonding sports event: 'Pass it to the homie/Now you hit it,' raps one of Snoop's posse in the most callous tone possible. It's an example of how musically artful, yet lyrically repellent, this album can be." Touré of Rolling Stone commented in regard to the song, "It's a funny song if you don't think about how the woman 2Pac and his homies allegedly sodomized might feel about it, but most hip-hop fans are so used to the ethical deadening hip-hop routinely demands that they won't. Pray that "No Fun" isn't misinterpreted by some sick fan, like Nirvana's "Polly" was, as an encouragement to rape." Ian Cohen of Stylus Magazine remarked "'Ain't No Fun' finds me being a little conflicted; while I won't question its party credentials or its quotability, it's in the same category as 'Caress Me Down' and 'Put It in Your Mouth,' co-opted by drunken college girls who might let you hold their hand by the fourth date, but have no problem singing along with 'cause you gave me all your pussy and you even licked my balls.'" When comparing the song to "Bitches Ain't Shit" by Dr. Dre, he wrote "To be honest, I'm not settled on going with 'Ain't No Fun' here, but it has a chorus that's more acceptable to sing in public." Tidal's Ryan Pinkard described the song as "wildly misogynistic" and an "unlikely dance floor staple".

== Lawsuit ==
On August 4, 2016, rappers Antonio White and Craig Ward filed a lawsuit against the artists alongside Dr. Dre and Suge Knight in the California Central District Court, claiming copyright infringement and fraud. According to White and Ward, they wrote an earlier version of "Ain't No Fun", which the chorus of the song originally appeared in and which was intended to appear on their album Volume 1 — Out to Get a Grip. Furthermore, the lawsuit stated that Suge Knight admitted to stealing the song from them in the aforementioned interview with Rolling Stone and "The verses of both songs are concerned with homies relaxing one night, getting high and having a dialogue addressed to a female who previously had sex with the speaker, followed by suggesting an elaborate scenario, that the female should be sexually shared among the homies, described in a partly humorous, partly derisive tone."

== Certifications ==
Region	Certification	Certified units/sales
New Zealand (RMNZ)	2× Platinum	60,000^{‡}
^{‡} Sales+streaming figures based on certification alone.
