= Ricky Harris =

American actor (1962–2016)

- Born: Richard George Harris II; October 5, 1962; Long Beach, California, U.S.
- Died: December 26, 2016 (aged 54); Los Angeles, California, U.S.
- Occupations: Producer; actor; comedian
- Years active: 1983–2016
- Spouse: Dee Barnes (divorced)
- Children: 2

Richard George Harris II (October 5, 1962 – December 26, 2016), known professionally as Ricky Harris, was an American producer, actor, and comedian. He was best known for his role as Malvo in the UPN/The CW sitcom Everybody Hates Chris.

== Life and career ==
Harris was born and raised in Long Beach, California. He played his first movie roles in Poetic Justice in 1993 and Murder Was the Case in 1994. He also had minor roles in Michael Mann's 1995 crime film Heat and Mikael Salomon's 1998 action movie Hard Rain.

Harris was the voice of DJ EZ Dicc, TaaDow, and Saul-T-Nutz from various skits featured on albums from Snoop Dogg to Tha Dogg Pound.

In 1993, Harris starred with Todd Hunter in the single episode of 357 Marina del Rey produced for the television series Danger Theatre, playing private detective Clay Gentry. From 1996 to 1998 he played the role of Javon "J. W." Willis in six episodes of the UPN situation comedy Moesha.

In the 2001 film Bones, Harris played alongside Snoop Dogg and Pam Grier.

In 2004, Harris lent his voice to various characters in the video game Grand Theft Auto: San Andreas. In 2007, he played the role of Cousin Fred in the film This Christmas. From 2006 to 2008, Harris played Malvo, a recurring character in the sitcom Everybody Hates Chris.

In December 2016, Harris died from a heart attack. He had suffered a previous heart attack two years prior.

== Filmography ==
=== Film ===
Year	Title	Role	Notes
1993	Poetic Justice	Gangsta	
1995	Tales from the Hood	Lil' Deke	
1995	Heat	Albert Torena	
1996	High School High	D.J.	
1997	Fathers' Day	Bellhop	
1998	Hard Rain	Ray	
1998	Kings	Trevor	Short
1999	Thick as Thieves	Rodney	
1999	The Breaks	Militant Leader	
1999	Simon Sez	Macro	
2001	Bones	Eddie Mack	
2004	Woman Thou Art Loosed	Eli	
2005	Boss'n Up	Interviewer	
2007	The Memory Thief	Hearse Driver	
2007	This Christmas	Cousin Fred	
2009	Dough Boys	Faze Disco	
2009	Mr. Sadman	Whitey	
2012	Battlefield America	Tyrone Jackson Sr.	
2013	Mid Life Gangster	Donnie	
2015	Dope	Tannehill James	
2015	A Royal Family Holiday	Nelson	TV movie
2015	Royal Family Christmas	Nelson	TV movie
2017	Check Point	Kenny	
2019	The Workout Room	Himself	

=== Television ===
Year	Title	Role	Notes
1993	Danger Theatre	Clay Gentry	Episode: "Searcher in the Mist/Sex, Lies & Decaf"
1996–98	Moesha	J.W.	Recurring cast: season 1 & 3, guest: season 2
1997	Millennium	Gerome Knox	Episode: "Sense and Antisense"
2000	CSI: Crime Scene Investigation	Disco Placid	Episode: "Anonymous"
2001	The District	Gregory	Episode: "Don't Fence Me In"
2001	NYPD Blue	Antoine	Episode: "Flight of Fancy"
2002	MDs	Randy Stilton	Episode: "Time of Death"
2003	Fastlane	K-9	Episode: "Defense" & "Offense"
2003	Lucky	-	Episode: "The Tell"
2003	The Handler	Pablo	Episode: "Big Stones"
2003	The Tracy Morgan Show	Clarence	Episode: "Stealing"
2004	CSI: NY	Disco Placid	Episode: "Grand Master"
2004	NYPD Blue	Stanley Newell	Episode: "Bale Out"
2005	ER	Mr. Davis	Episode: "Alone in a Crowd"
2006–08	Everybody Hates Chris	Malvo	Recurring cast: season 2 & 4, guest: season 3
2007	CSI: Miami	Jeremy Broyle	Episode: "Miami Confidential"
2008	Raising the Bar	Defendant	Episode: "Richie Richer"
2008	The Game	Claude	Episode: "Oh, What a Night"
2009	Dark Blue	Wade	Episode: "Pilot"
2011	The Cape	Homeless Witness	Episode: "Kozmo"
2016	The People v. O. J. Simpson: American Crime Story	Black Bullhorn/Protester	Episode: "The Race Card"

=== Music videos ===
Year	Song	Artist	Role
1994	"Gin & Juice"	Snoop Dogg	Father
1994	"Murder Was the Case"	Snoop Dogg	Eyewitness/Ta-Dow/Snoop's Father
1995	"Summertime in the LBC"	The Dove Shack	Old Man

=== Video games ===
Year	Game	Role	Notes
2004	Grand Theft Auto: San Andreas	Grove Street Families Gang, Ballas Gang, Master Sounds 98.3 DJ Johnny "The Love Giant" Parkinson (voice)	
2021	Grand Theft Auto: The Trilogy - The Definitive Edition	Grove Street Families Gang, Ballas Gang, Master Sounds 98.3 DJ Johnny "The Love Giant" Parkinson (voice)	Archival recordings Remaster of Grand Theft Auto: San Andreas only
