= What's My Name? (Snoop Doggy Dogg song) =

1993 single by Snoop Doggy Dogg

Single by Snoop Doggy Dogg

from the album Doggystyle
- Released: November 11, 1993
- Genre: West Coast hip-hop; gangsta rap; G-funk
- Length: 4:06
- Label: Death Row; Interscope; Atlantic
- Songwriter: Snoop Doggy Dogg
- Producer: Dr. Dre

Snoop Doggy Dogg singles chronology
"Let Me Ride" (1993)	"What's My Name?" (1993)	"Gin and Juice" (1994)

Music video
- "Who Am I? (What's My Name?)" on YouTube

"Who Am I? (What's My Name?)" (commonly titled "What's My Name?") is a song by American rapper Snoop Doggy Dogg, released as his debut solo single on November 11, 1993. Released through Death Row and Interscope Records, it served as the lead single from his first album, Doggystyle (1993). The song, produced by Dr. Dre, features samples and interpolations from George Clinton's "Atomic Dog" in its chorus and throughout, the bass line from Funkadelic's "(Not Just) Knee Deep," and an interpolation from Parliament's "Give Up the Funk (Tear the Roof off the Sucker)" in its bridge. The song contains additional vocals by Jewell and Edward Tony Green, and its intro contains a sample from the Counts' "Pack of Lies." A vocal sample ("the bomb") from Parliament's "P. Funk (Wants to Get Funked Up)" can be heard throughout. The accompanying music video was directed by Fab Five Freddy, featuring the rapper transforming into a dog.

The song and video were parodied in director Rusty Cundieff's film, Fear of a Black Hat (1993). In the UK in 2014, the song was used on an advert for MoneySupermarket, which featured Snoop Dogg. It was ranked number 456 on NME's "500 Greatest Songs of All Time".

== Critical reception ==
Alan Jones from Music Week gave the song four out of five and named it Pick of the Week, writing, "Clearly influenced by George Clinton, Cameo and the like, this laidback rap cut has been widely praised with the industry has a gimmick warcry, some soulful femmes and stands every chance of being a hit." NME named it What's My Muthaf—in' Single of the Week, saying, "In time and tune with the '70s revival, Dre has hit a seam of incendiary funk and it just don't stop — coupled with Snoop's irresistible style they've got a Jurassic-size monster of a hit on their hands." The reviewer also praised it as "a straight-up party record, fit for any and every occasion, with more hooks than 20 rounds of Eubank v Benn. This is gonna be HUGE." Ralph Tee from the Record Mirror Dance Update complimented "its infectious "Bow wow wow yippy yo yippy yeah" hook and a production steeped in the tradition of Seventies George Clinton and Cameo". He stated that "it's Snoop's rhymes and the aforementioned hook that's making this a smash". Adam Higginbotham from Select remarked "the viscous P-Funk squelch" evidenced on the single. Charles Aaron from Spin commented, "There's a big diff between asking "Who Am I?" and being prepared for conflicting answers from your audience, and asking "What's My Name?" and having yet another fucking George Clinton sample reinforce your ego."

== Commercial performance ==
"Who Am I? (What's My Name?)" was the first top 10 hit of Snoop Dogg on the US Billboard Hot 100 and Cash Box Top 100, the first as a lead rap artist. The song reached number eight on both charts, while topping the Billboard Hot Rap Songs for three weeks. It was certified gold by the Recording Industry Association of America (RIAA) in 1994.

== Music video ==
American visual artist, filmmaker, and hip hop pioneer Fab 5 Freddy directs a CGI-driven music video for the song. Snoop and others (Kurupt, Daz Dillinger, and Warren G) are able to transform into dogs (such as Dobermann Pinschers, Rottweilers, Pit bulls, and Cocker Spaniels and several other breeds) to evade upsetting fathers and run wild, while also evading a pair of clumsy dog catchers while in these forms. One scene shows the dogs wearing sunglasses, smoking cigars and gambling on dice games (an homage to the late 19th century/early 20th century series of paintings by Cassius Marcellus Coolidge titled Dogs Playing Poker). Throughout the video Snoop can be seen standing on the roof of V.I.P. Records, a record store and studio where Snoop Dogg recorded some of his first material. One of the video vixens in the barbeque cookout scene in the video was played by now-clinical nurse Athena Germany, who later appeared in Family Feud with rest of her family in 2021.

== Live performances ==
Snoop performed the song live on The Arsenio Hall Show on December 17, 1993, and on Soul Train on December 18, 1993. He also performed the song live at the 1994 Soul Train Music Awards on March 15, 1994.

== Track listing ==
- CD single
1. "Who Am I? (What's My Name?)" (clean radio mix) — 4:15
2. "Who Am I? (What's My Name?)" (clean club mix) — 5:03
3. "Who Am I? (What's My Name?)" (explicit club mix) — 8:12
4. "Who Am I? (What's My Name?)" (LP version) — 4:15
5. "Who Am I? (What's My Name?)" (instrumental) — 4:15

== Charts ==
=== Weekly charts ===
Chart (1993–1994)	Peak position
Australia (ARIA)	13
Belgium (Ultratop 50 Flanders)	22
Canada Dance/Urban (RPM)	4
Denmark (IFPI)	10
Europe (Eurochart Hot 100)	29
Europe (European Hit Radio)	25
France (SNEP)	11
Germany (GfK)	20
Iceland (Íslenski Listinn Topp 40)	21
Ireland (IRMA)	28
Netherlands (Dutch Top 40)	11
Netherlands (Single Top 100)	8
New Zealand (Recorded Music NZ)	4
Sweden (Sverigetopplistan)	14
Switzerland (Schweizer Hitparade)	21
UK Singles (Official Charts)	20
UK Hip Hop/R&B (Official Charts)	27
UK Airplay (Music Week)	20
UK Dance (Music Week)	2
UK Club Chart (Music Week)	36
US Billboard Hot 100	8
US Hot Dance Club Play (Billboard)	43
US Hot R&B/Hip-Hop Songs (Billboard)	8
US Hot Rap Songs (Billboard)	1
US Rhythmic Airplay (Billboard)	12
US Cash Box Top 100	8

=== Year-end charts ===
Chart (1994)	Position
Australia (ARIA)	61
Brazil (Mais Tocadas)	67
Europe (Eurochart Hot 100)	87
France (SNEP)	29
Germany (Media Control)	99
US Billboard Hot 100	62
US Hot R&B Singles (Billboard)	75
US Hot Rap Singles (Billboard)	23

== Certifications ==
Region	Certification	Certified units/sales
New Zealand (RMNZ)	2× Platinum	60,000^{‡}
United Kingdom (BPI) Sales since 2010	Gold	400,000^{‡}
United States (RIAA)	Gold	500,000^{^}
^{^} Shipments figures based on certification alone.^{‡} Sales+streaming figures based on certification alone.

== Release history ==
Region	Date	Format(s)	Label(s)	Ref.
United States	November 11, 1993	Cassette	Death Row; Interscope	
United Kingdom	November 22, 1993	7-inch vinyl; 12-inch vinyl; CD; cassette	Death Row; Interscope	

== See also ==
- List of Billboard Hot 100 top 10 singles in 1994
