= Hurt-M-Badd =

- Born: Tyrone Wrice
- Origin: California, United States
- Genres: R&B; hip hop
- Occupations: Singer; record producer; DJ
- Instruments: Synthesizer, keyboards, turntables, drum machine, sampler
- Years active: 1993–2002, 2013
- Labels: Death Row; Rap-A-Lot

Tyrone Wrice, better known by his stage name Hurt-M-Badd, is an American singer and record producer. He is a former member of short-lived R&B duo B-Rezell with Marc "MGM" McWilliams, which appeared on Death Row Records 1994 compilations Murder Was the Case and Above the Rim – The Soundtrack before the break-up. He participated on Tupac Shakur's 1996 The Don Killuminati: The 7 Day Theory album, most notably produced the single "Hail Mary". In 1997 he co-produced one song each for The Lady of Rage's debut album and Gang Related – The Soundtrack. From 1998 to 2002, he continued to produce songs for the Outlawz and 2Pac's posthumous releases, as well as worked with Willie D and Snypaz. In 2013 he produced a bonus track for Fatal's The Interview: It's Not a Gimmik 2 Me.

== Discography ==
=== Guest appearances ===
List of non-single guest appearances, with other performing artists, showing year released and album name
| Title | Year | Other performer(s) | Album |
|---|---|---|---|
| "Horny" | 1994 | B-Rezell | Murder Was the Case |
| "Blowed Away" | 1994 | B-Rezell | Above the Rim – The Soundtrack |
| "Hold Ya Head" | 1996 | Makaveli | The Don Killuminati: The 7 Day Theory |
| "Hammer Time Brings It" | 1996 | MC Hammer | Too Tight |
| "If I Was White" | 2000 | Willie D | Loved by Few, Hated by Many |
| "She Likes 2 Ball" | 2000 | Willie D | Loved by Few, Hated by Many |
