= Snoopified =

Snoopified - The Best of Snoop Dogg

Greatest hits album by Snoop Dogg
- Released: September 28, 2005
- Recorded: 1998–2002
- Genre: West Coast hip hop; gangsta rap; G-funk
- Length: 1:18:33
- Label: Priority; EMI

Snoop Dogg chronology
Welcome to tha Chuuuch, Vol. 8 (Preach Tabernacal) (2005)	Snoopified (2005)	From Compton to Long Beach (2005)

Snoopified - The Best of Snoop Dogg is the third greatest hits album by Snoop Dogg. It was released on September 28, 2005 by Priority Records. It contains mostly singles, charted and well-known songs from his albums released by No Limit Records and Priority. It has two additional tracks, "Hell Yeah" (Stone Cold Steve Austin Theme) from the WWF Aggression compilation (2000) and "Ride On" from the soundtrack Caught Up (1998).

== Reception ==
Professional ratings
Review scores
Source	Rating
Allmusic	4/5 stars

The album reached the 50th spot on the UK Top 75 Album chart, falling back the following week and failed to stay in the 75 for the third week. It nearly sold 10,800 copies and ranked #121 on the Billboard 200. It has sold over 119,747 copies. Although the album excludes tracks from Snoop's landmark Doggystyle record, it provides popular songs from his four albums released between 1998 and 2002.

Allmusic gave the album 4 stars out of 5 and said, "A lot of people — fans and haters alike — declared Snoop's career dead once the disastrous first No Limit album came out, so the MC himself must feel at least a little vindicated that this set exists."

== Track listing ==
No.	Title	Producer(s)	Length
1.	"Beautiful" (featuring Pharrell and Charlie Wilson, from Paid tha Cost to Be da Boss)	The Neptunes	4:59
2.	"Snoop Dogg (What's My Name Pt. 2)" (from Tha Last Meal)	Timbaland	4:03
3.	"Woof!" (featuring Mystikal and Fiend, from Da Game Is to Be Sold, Not to Be Told)	Master P, Craig B	4:21
4.	"Lay Low" (featuring Master P, Nate Dogg, Butch Cassidy and Tha Eastsidaz, from Tha Last Meal)	Dr. Dre, Mike Elizondo	3:42
5.	"Down For My Niggaz" (featuring C-Murder and Magic, from No Limit Top Dogg and Trapped in Crime)	KLC	3:45
6.	"From tha Chuuuch to da Palace" (featuring Pharrell, from Paid tha Cost to Be da Boss)	The Neptunes	4:45
7.	"Trick Please" (featuring Xzibit and Nate Dogg, from No Limit Top Dogg)	Dr. Dre	3:54
8.	"Still a G Thang" (from Da Game Is to Be Sold, Not to Be Told)	Meech Wells	4:19
9.	"Just Dippin'" (featuring Dr. Dre and Jewell, from No Limit Top Dogg)	Dr. Dre	4:03
10.	"Wrong Idea" (featuring Bad Azz, Kokane and Lil' Half Dead, from Tha Last Meal)	Jellyroll	4:15
11.	"Stoplight" (from Paid tha Cost to Be da Boss)	Jellyroll	4:20
12.	"Snoopafella" (from No Limit Top Dogg)	Ant Banks	5:23
13.	"The One and Only" (from Paid tha Cost to Be da Boss)	DJ Premier	3:50
14.	"Loosen' Control" (featuring Butch Cassidy, from Tha Last Meal)	Soopafly	4:09
15.	"Gin & Juice II" (from Da Game Is to Be Sold, Not to Be Told)	Carlos Stephens	3:36
16.	"Stacey Adams" (featuring Kokane, from Tha Last Meal)	Battlecat	4:35
17.	"Ride On" (featuring Kurupt, from Caught Up: Music from the Motion Picture)	Marc N tha Dark, Snoop Dogg, DJ Quik	4:41
18.	"G Bedtime Stories" (from No Limit Top Dogg)	Meech Wells	2:15
19.	"Hell Yeah" (featuring WC, from WWF Aggression)	Bink	3:38
Total length:			1:18:33

== Chart performance ==
=== Weekly charts ===
Chart (2005)	Peak position
Belgian Albums (Ultratop Flanders)	63
Dutch Albums (Album Top 100)	72
French Albums (SNEP)	19
Italian Albums (FIMI)	77
Scottish Albums (Official Charts)	49
Swiss Albums (Schweizer Hitparade)	100
UK Albums (Official Charts)	50
UK R&B Albums (Official Charts)	16
US Billboard 200	121
US Top R&B/Hip-Hop Albums (Billboard)	44
US Top Rap Albums (Billboard)	21

Chart (2026)	Peak position
Greek Albums (IFPI)	94
