= Best of Dana Dane =

Compilation album by Dana Dane
- Released: March 26, 2002
- Recorded: 1987–1990
- Genre: Hip hop
- Label: BMG Special Products
- Producer: Hurby Luv Bug; The Invincibles

Dana Dane chronology
Rollin' Wit Dana Dane (1995)	Best of Dana Dane (2002)

Professional ratings
Review scores
Source	Rating
AllMusic	3/5 stars

Best of Dana Dane is a compilation album released by Dana Dane. It was released on March 26, 2002, on BMG Special Products and was produced by Hurby Luv Bug and the Invincibles. The album only featured songs from Dana Dane's first two albums, Dana Dane with Fame and Dana Dane 4 Ever, leaving his last album Rollin' Wit Dana Dane out because of its different ownership.

== Track listing ==
1. "Cinderfella Dana Dane" – 5:24
2. "Nightmares" – 5:51
3. "Keep the Groove" – 3:56
4. "This be the Def Beat" – 3:20
5. "We Wanna Party" – 3:00
6. "Tales from the Dane Side" – 5:16
7. "Delancey Street" – 5:26
8. "Something Special" – 4:53
9. "Bedie Boo" – 2:23
10. "What Dirty Minds U Have" – 3:51
