= No Limit Top Dogg =

1999 studio album by Snoop Dogg

Studio album by Snoop Dogg
- Released: May 11, 1999
- Recorded: 1998–1999
- Genres: West Coast hip-hop; gangsta rap; G-funk
- Length: 77:41
- Labels: No Limit; Priority
- Producers: Master P (exec.); Dr. Dre; Bud'da; Meech Wells; DJ Quik; Ant Banks; KLC; Jelly Roll; G-One; Raphael Saadiq; Def Jef; Goldie Loc

Snoop Dogg chronology
Da Game Is to Be Sold, Not to Be Told (1998)	No Limit Top Dogg (1999)	Dead Man Walkin' (2000)

Singles from No Limit Top Dogg
- 1. "G Bedtime Stories" Released: February 6, 1999; 2. "Bitch Please" Released: April 29, 1999; 3. "Down for My N's" Released: September 27, 1999

No Limit Top Dogg is the fourth studio album by American rapper Snoop Dogg. It was released through No Limit and Priority Records on May 11, 1999. Following the mixed reception of his previous album, Da Game Is to Be Sold, Not to Be Told (1998), Snoop began working with Dr. Dre again and returned to the West Coast sound of his earlier career from Death Row Records. The album was generally met with positive reception with music critics citing it as a return to form since Doggystyle (1993), praising Dr. Dre's production and Snoop's delivery, while criticized for its length, the No Limit features, and rehashing old themes. The Source placed the album on their list of the "Top 10 Best Albums of the Year" for 1999.

No Limit Top Dogg debuted at number 2 on the Billboard 200, selling 187,000 copies in its first week in the United States, only being second to Ricky Martin's self-titled album. The album was later certified platinum by the Recording Industry Association of America (RIAA), and as of March 2008, the album has sold 1,518,000 copies in the United States, and 2 million worldwide as of 2016.

== Background ==
Following the release of Da Game Is to Be Sold, Not to Be Told, Snoop was granted more creative freedom from Master P that resulted in an album that returned to the sound of his early career on Death Row. Snoop Dogg explained that Master P limited creative control as he was forming him into the No Limit roster, which he answered that being allowed creative control from the beginning "wouldn't have been the smarted thing to do".

With this newfound freedom, Snoop sought out the help of former mentor and producer Dr. Dre, marking their first collaboration since the latter left Death Row in 1996. Regarding their relationship over the years, Snoop said they continued reaching out and taking collaborating in projects, but decided they were back to working with each other publicly thanks to public demand. Attempts at reuniting date back to early 1998 when both collaborated on the song "Zoom". However, contract problems emerged that prevented the release of said version (Snoop's verses were replaced by East Coast rapper LL Cool J and included in the soundtrack to the film Bulworth). Along with a slew of other former label mates and collaborators including Warren G, Nate Dogg, Jewell, DJ Quik, and Raphael Saadiq, Snoop himself viewed the album to be a companion piece to his debut album Doggystyle.

The album cover also marks a significant departure from the usual design style of all No Limit releases. In regards to this decision, Master P stated "When you look at that Snoop record, you know, you let Snoop be himself." He further stated "You look at his cover and it's got none of the bling and stuff that we always had, it's more about the dogs and what his image is about."

== Music ==
=== Recording ===
In comparison to his previous release Da Game Is to Be Sold, Not to Be Told which according to Snoop only took three weeks to make, work on this album spanned over many months beginning in 1998. The album also marks a departure from the southern sound of previous No Limit releases with only a few tracks featuring production and vocals from other No Limit artists and producers, instead opting to work with more fellow West Coast rappers and producers in a "conscious effort" to return to his brand of music that was present earlier in his career. Of the 19 songs on the album, three were produced by Dr. Dre. "It was matter of getting some shit from Dre that I didn't have, that would best represent him and would best represent me over his music," Snoop Dogg said. "He [directed] me on what to say and how to say it. I just chose the type of beats I wanted and the type of topics I wanted to rap about." In response to working again with Snoop and how times have changed since last working together, Dre shared that Snoop evolved into being humble, focused, and disciplined in the album's production.

Snoop also continues a previous tradition on his albums to include a cover of an older Hip-Hop song with the song "Snoopafella" (a remake of the song "Cinderfella Dana Dane" by New York rapper Dana Dane). Despite limited involvement on a musical level from No Limit, Snoop has stated that Master P has influenced the album in other ways with the track "I Love My Momma". Snoop mentions "If I wouldn't be on No Limit, I wouldn't even did a song like that, but since Master P, every album he do, he got a song about his momma. He got a song about his dead brother." Snoop also took influence again in his vocal performance from Dr. Dre himself during the process of making and recording songs. He further commented on the chemistry they both still had despite being separate for a while as well as how Dre once again took on a mentor role with him.

=== Production ===
"Buck 'Em"
"Buck 'Em" is noted for its guitar solo and production that highlighted Dr. Dre's production by the early 2000s.

The overall production of the album has been noted to be heavily rooted in early '80s funk with a mixture of both West Coast and southern influences coming from his label at No Limit and his associates from his tenure at Death Row. In comparison to Da Game, only two tracks on the whole album are produced by No Limit's in-house production team Beats by the Pound. Dr. Dre's involvement was a major point of interest of the album for both fans and critics at the time of release with his influence being prevalent throughout. Despite his involvement, the album also branches out to newer styles of music that differs from ones found on The Chronic and Doggystyle. On tracks like "Buck 'Em", guitar elements were used that became present on other Dre productions of the time (like Eminem's "Role Model" from The Slim Shady LP) which hinted at what was to be featured on Dre's own 2001 album later that year. Other producers also make new contributions like the use of violins on the song "Trust Me", a rap ballad commenting about relationships. The album also ventures further into soul than previous releases with tracks like "Somethin' Bout Yo Bidness" and "I Love My Momma". Less apparent in the album's production is also the chiming keyboard loops found in Dre's earlier work that was highly popular at the time. The album is also a precursor to the West Coast Hip-Hop resurgence in popularity during that year.

== Critical reception ==
Professional ratings
Review scores
Source	Rating
AllMusic	3/5 stars
Entertainment Weekly	B
Los Angeles Times	3/4 stars
NME	8/10
RapReviews	8.5/10
Rolling Stone	3/5 stars
The Source	4/5 stars
USA Today	3/4 stars

Top Dogg generally gained positive reviews with many critics citing it as a return to form after the mixed reception and different direction of the previous two albums released. Nathan Rabin of The A.V. Club noted "... Dogg sounds happier, looser, and more confident on Top Dogg than he has on any album since his Chronic/Doggystyle glory days." Later in the review he called it "... a vital album, and easily Snoop Dogg's best album since Doggystyle." The Washington Post highlighted the Dre-produced tracks "Just Dippin'" and "Buck 'Em" as one of the best Snoop-Dre collaborations. Source writer Frank Williams called it nearly flawless and said "By returning to his original 1993 flyness, Snoop meshes all his influences to create an album that will ride for a long time." The magazine later included the album on its "Top 10 Albums of the Year [1999]" list. Kevin Powell of Rolling Stone called the album "Snoop's finest work since his debut album...full of seductive party jams that will keep heads bobbing through the summer. Snoop has returned to West Coast G-funk with the help of some old friends...like Dr. Dre and DJ Quik." Neil Strauss of The New York Times positively compared the album to Snoop Dogg's previous release calling it a major musical improvement. NME mentioned "...the silken, sumptuous flow of yore is back, threading deluxe soul and full-bodied grooves....the cool drawl of Snoop...captivates, unveiling tales of love, thuggery, surviving and succeeding in the wild west....a certifiable return to form."

Despite the overall positive reception to the album it did receive some criticism from critics. The majority of it being aimed at the length of the whole project as well as the obligatory No Limit tracks. Stephen Thomas Erlewine of Allmusic said "...it runs way too long and is filled with superfluous, even irritating cameos, and also that Snoop is content to haul out low-rent gangsta clichés." He further comments on the lack of interesting and clever lyrics in comparison to his older material years ago. The A.V. Club also addresses the length being a problem with it being a few tracks too long. Criticism is also drawn to the tracks with features from other No Limit artists which writer Nathan Rabin considers to be the lowest points of the whole album. The Source's only criticism of the album is also aimed at the two No Limit tracks "Down 4 My Niggaz" and "Ghetto Symphony" calling them "overly-simplistic". Rolling Stone in particular criticized Snoop's lack of growth as a lyricist while declaring the whole album as not worthy of being compared to his debut.

In a retrospective list by Complex, the magazine placed No Limit Top Dogg at Number 17 on their list of "The Top 25 Best No Limit Albums" on April 5, 2013. This is the only album by Snoop Dogg on the label to be included on the list. Entertainment Weekly in 2015 ranked the album third overall as Snoop Dogg's best album only behind 2002's Paid Tha Cost To Be Da Bo$$ and 1993's Doggystyle respectively.

== Commercial performance ==
No Limit Top Dogg debuted at number-two and one on the US Billboard 200 and Top R&B/Hip-Hop Albums respectively, selling 187,400 copies in its first week. which was second only to Ricky Martin's 1999 self-titled album with huge first week sales of 661,000 copies. The following week the album sold an additional 108,000 copies dropping to number-seven until eventually bowing out of the top ten the following week. Although the release of the single 'Bitch Please' which gained popularity on both the radio and television helped album sales with a 16% rise on the Billboard 200 after months of declining on the charts. Despite not being as commercially successful as Still a G Thang from his previous album as it failed to chart within the Top 40 of the Billboard Hot 100 (peaking at 77), it still managed to peak at number-eight on the Billboard Hot Rap Singles on August 28 making it one of his highest ranking songs on that chart at the time. The music video also peaked at number-three on BET and charted within the top 20 most played videos on MTV. The video was directed by Dr. Dre.

Top Dogg eventually spent 40 weeks on the Billboard 200 which is second only to Doggystyle on weeks spent on the charts for a Snoop Dogg album. Despite being Snoop Dogg's first album to not debut at number-one and have strong first-week album sales, it was certified platinum on October 13, 1999 and sold 1,100,000 copies by the end of 1999 making it the 73rd best selling album of the year. Some speculated the reason for the relatively low turn out for the first week sales of the album is a result of the anticipation for Ricky Martin's album released the same week. The low awareness for the album was also thought to be due to a lack of a video or hit single prior to the release. As of March 2008, the album has sold 1,518,000 copies in the United States and 2 million worldwide as of 2016.

== Track listing ==
No.	Title	Writer(s)	Producer(s)	Length
1.	"Dolomite Intro"			0:27
2.	"Buck 'Em" (featuring Sticky Fingaz)	Calvin Broadus, Jr.; Kirk Jones; Andre Young	Dr. Dre	2:44
3.	"Trust Me" (featuring Suga Free and Sylk-E. Fyne)	Broadus, Jr.; Dejuan Walker; La'Mar Johnson; Stephen Anderson	Bud'da	4:09
4.	"My Heat Goes Boom"	Broadus, Jr.; Cecil Womack, Jr.	Meech Wells	3:40
5.	"Dolomite"			0:52
6.	"Snoopafella"	Broadus, Jr.; Anthony Banks	Ant Banks	5:22
7.	"In Love with a Thug"	Broadus, Jr.; Womack, Jr.	Meech Wells	3:44
8.	"G Bedtime Stories"	Broadus, Jr.; Womack, Jr.	Meech Wells	2:14
9.	"Down 4 My N's" (featuring C-Murder and Magic)	Broadus, Jr.; Corey Miller; Awood Johnson, Jr.; Craig Lawson	KLC	3:46
10.	"Betta Days"	Broadus, Jr.; Womack, Jr.; Jeffrey Fortson	Meech Wells; Def Jef	3:55
11.	"Somethin Bout Yo Bidness" (featuring Raphael Saadiq)	Broadus, Jr.; Raphael Saadiq; George "G-One" Archie	Saadiq; G-One	4:10
12.	"Bitch Please" (featuring Xzibit and Nate Dogg)	Broadus, Jr.; Alvin Joiner; Nathaniel Hale; Young	Dr. Dre	3:54
13.	"Doin' Too Much"	Broadus, Jr.; David Blake	DJ Quik	4:07
14.	"Gangsta Ride" (featuring Silkk the Shocker)	Broadus, Jr.; Vyshonn Miller; Womack, Jr.	Meech Wells	3:44
15.	"Ghetto Symphony" (featuring Mia X, Fiend, C-Murder, Silkk the Shocker, Mystikal, and Goldie Loc)	Broadus, Jr.; Mia Young; Richard Jones; C. Miller; V. Miller; Michael Tyler; Keiwan "Goldie Loc" Spillman; Lawson	KLC	5:40
16.	"Party with a D.P.G."	Broadus, Jr.; David "Jelly Roll" Drew	Jelly Roll	4:55
17.	"Buss'n Rocks"	Broadus, Jr.; Blake	DJ Quik	4:23
18.	"Just Dippin'" (featuring Dr. Dre and Jewell)	Broadus, Jr.; Young; Jewell Caples	Dr. Dre	4:03
19.	"Don't Tell" (featuring Warren G, Mausberg, and Nate Dogg)	Broadus, Jr.; Warren Griffin III; Johnny "Mausberg" Burns; Hale; Blake	DJ Quik	4:47
20.	"20 Minutes" (featuring Goldie Loc)	Broadus, Jr.; Spillman	Goldie Loc	3:59
21.	"I Love My Momma" (featuring Lenny Williams)	Broadus, Jr.; Lenny Williams; Womack, Jr.	Meech Wells	3:06
Total length:				77:41

Sample credits

- "My Heat Goes Boom" contains a sample from "Only in California" as performed by Mack 10
- "Snoopafella" contains a sample from "Cinderfella Dana Dane" as performed by Dana Dane, and "Dazz" as performed by Brick
- "In Love with a Thug" contains a sample from "Moments in Love" as performed by Art of Noise
- "Down 4 My N's" contains a sample from "Ike's Mood I" as performed by Isaac Hayes
- "Betta Days" samples "I Like Funky Music" as performed by Uncle Louie, and "Heartbeat" as performed by Taana Gardner
- "Bitch Please" samples "Smooth Operator" as performed by Sade, and "Treat Her Like a Prostitute" as performed by Slick Rick
- "Ghetto Symphony" contains a sample from "The Symphony" as performed by Marley Marl
- "Party with a D.P.G." contains a sample from "Shining Star" as performed by Earth, Wind & Fire
- "Buss'n Rocks" contains a sample from "Agony of Defeet" as performed by Parliament, and "Zoom" as performed by Commodores
- "Don't Tell" contains a sample from "Ain't No Fun (If the Homies Can't Have None)" as performed by Snoop Dogg
- "20 Minutes" contains a sample from "Row, Row, Row Your Boat" as performed by Traditional Folk

== Charts ==
=== Weekly charts ===
Chart (1999)	Peak position
Australian Albums (ARIA)	48
Canadian Albums (Billboard)	10
Dutch Albums (Album Top 100)	62
French Albums (SNEP)	53
German Albums (Offizielle Top 100)	46
New Zealand Albums (RMNZ)	25
UK Albums Chart	48
UK R&B Chart	4
US Billboard 200	2
US Top R&B/Hip-Hop Albums (Billboard)	1

=== Year-end charts ===
Chart (1999)	Position
US Billboard 200	81
US Top R&B/Hip-Hop Albums	30

== Certifications ==
Region	Certification	Certified units/sales
Canada (Music Canada)	Gold	50,000^{^}
United Kingdom (BPI)	Gold	100,000^{‡}
United States (RIAA)	Platinum	1,518,000
^{^} Shipments figures based on certification alone.^{‡} Sales+streaming figures based on certification alone.

== See also ==
- List of number-one R&B albums of 1999 (U.S.)
