= Dana Dane with Fame =

Studio album by Dana Dane
- Released: May 22, 1987
- Recorded: 1985–1987
- Studio: Power Play Studios (New York, NY); Bayside Studios (New York, NY); I.N.S. Studios (New York, NY); Delta Recording Studios (New York, NY)
- Genre: Golden age hip hop
- Length: 37:51
- Label: Profile
- Producer: Hurby Luv Bug; Sam Jacobs Sr.; Sam Jacobs Jr.

Dana Dane chronology
Dana Dane with Fame (1987)	Dana Dane 4 Ever (1990)

Professional ratings
Review scores
Source	Rating
AllMusic	4.5/5 stars
RapReviews	6.5/10
The Village Voice	C+

Dana Dane with Fame is the debut studio album by American rapper Dana Dane. It was released in 1987 via Profile Records. Recording sessions took place at Power Play Studios, at Bayside Studios, at I.N.S. Studios and at Delta Recording Studios in New York. Production was handled by Hurby Luv Bug, except for one track, which was produced by Sam Jacobs and Sam Jacobs Jr. The album peaked at number 46 on the US Billboard 200 and number 2 on the Top R&B Albums. It features four singles: "Nightmares", "Delancey Street", "Cinderfella Dana Dane" and "This Be The Def Beat", which were charted on the Hot R&B/Hip-Hop Singles & Tracks at No. 21, No. 44, No. 11 and No. 30, respectively.

The song "Nightmares" is mentioned by fellow rapper AZ in the line "The names is changed, the games the same It's playin' fair, but years of Nightmares, like Dana Dane" from his 2005 track "Can't Stop" off of A.W.O.L. album. Snoop Dogg's song "Snoopafella" off of his 1999 album No Limit Top Dogg is based on "Cinderfella Dana Dane".

== Track listing ==
No.	Title	Length
1.	"Dedication"	0:22
2.	"Cinderfella Dana Dane"	5:34
3.	"This Be the Def Beat"	3:20
4.	"Dana Dane With Fame"	4:05
5.	"Delancey Street"	5:25
6.	"We Wanna Party"	2:59
7.	"Nightmares"	5:50
8.	"Keep the Groove"	3:56
9.	"Love at First Sight"	6:20
Total length:		37:51

== Personnel ==
- Dana McCleese – vocals, mixing (tracks: 1–4, 6, 8, 9), sleeve notes
- Jimmy Young – backing vocals (tracks: 2, 4)
- Cheryl Green – backing vocals (track 2)
- Mélady – backing vocals (track 2)
- Robyn Springer – backing vocals (track 4)
- Lisa Dove – backing vocals (track 4)
- Nedra Johnson – backing vocals (track 9)
- Harvetta Lawhorn – backing vocals (track 9)
- Rodolfo "DJ Clark Kent" Franklin – scratches
- Hurby "Luv Bug" Azor – producer (tracks: 1–6, 8, 9), mixing (tracks: 1–4, 6, 8, 9)
- Samuel Jacobs – producer & mixing (track 7)
- Samuel Jacobs Jr. – producer & mixing (track 7)
- Andre DeBourg – recording (tracks: 1–4, 6, 8, 9), engineering
- Patrick Adams – recording (tracks: 1–4, 6, 8, 9)
- Steve Ett – mixing (track 5)
- Craig Bevan – recording (track 5)
- Andrew Milano – recording (track 7)
- Howie Weinberg – mastering
- Janet Perr – design
- Marlene Cohen – design
- Gregory Homs – additional design
- Janette Beckman – photography

== Charts ==
Chart (1987)	Peak position
US Billboard 200	46
US Top R&B/Hip-Hop Albums (Billboard)	2
