= Pimp Slapp'd =

Song by Snoop Dogg

from the album Paid tha Cost to Be da Bo$$
- Genre: West coast hip hop; Gangsta rap; G-funk
- Length: 5:42
- Label: Doggystyle; Priority; Capitol
- Songwriters: Calvin Broadus; Bernard Edwards; Nile Rodgers; Worrell, Jr.; Collins; Clinton, Jr.; David Blake; Josef Laimberg; Norman Durham
- Producer: Josef Leimberg

"Pimp Slapp'd" is a diss song by American West Coast hip hop recording artist Snoop Dogg, taken from his sixth studio album, Paid tha Cost to Be da Bo$$ (2002).

== Background ==
=== Significance of Death Row Records ===
In the early 1990s Snoop Doggy Dogg was unknown, but he gained fame from debuting on the song "Deep Cover" with Dr. Dre on the soundtrack for the movie Deep Cover. He was also frequently being featured on Dr. Dre's 1992 debut album The Chronic. The Chronic was on the Death Row Records record label, a West Coast hip-hop label founded by Suge Knight in collaboration with The D.O.C. and Dr. Dre. The release of The Chronic prompted Death Row's popularisation, and Snoop Doggy Dogg released his 1993 debut album Doggystyle on Suge Knight's label, and other artists released music on Death Row, including 2Pac's All Eyez On Me.

=== Controversy of Death Row Records ===
Dr. Dre was the first to depart from Death Row due to infighting, as Sam Sneed was beaten up by other Death Row members due to featuring East Coast rappers on his music video for Lady Heroin, since this was during the East Coast-West Coast rivalry, then The D.O.C. and RBX followed Dre in leaving the label. However, months after the departure of Dre, RBX, and D.O.C., large exoduses coalesced because Suge Knight assaulted members of Death Row because like All Eyez On Me, he wanted 2Pac's album The Don Killuminati: The Seven Day Theory to have many appearances from Death Row artists, but the album had few appearances from Death Row artists, instead mostly appearances from members of Outlawz, if not mostly solo songs. Many artists left, and Suge Knight slandered them, and death threats ensued between Snoop Dogg (a departed artist) and Suge Knight, Snoop Dogg released Pimp Slapp'd to diss Suge Knight. In his diss song, Snoop Dogg also claimed Suge Knight was underpaying him.

== Lyrics ==
The song’s lyrics contain vulgar insults and violent threats to Suge Knight ("Suge Knight's a bitch, and that's on my life") ("Run up, get done up, I stay one up"), with accusations of Suge Knight underpaying Snoop Dogg ("And I still ain't been paid for 187 On a Cop"), dissing Suge Knight's record label known as Death Row Records and promoting Doggystyle Records (made by Snoop Dogg) as an alternative ("Doggystyle Records is the realest, nigga"). Snoop Dogg (in the song) claims Suge Knight is jealous (the chorus is "It all boils down to the fact that you're jealous how my papers stack" and Snoop Dogg calling Suge Knight a "jealous ass nigga").

The song also has disses towards Xzibit, Crooked I and Kurupt. Xzibit was approached by Suge Knight and his entorage in a club sometime in 2002, and when asked about his relationship with Dr. Dre and Snoop Dogg, Xzibit replied that he only made music with them, resulting in Snoop spitting the lyric "I'm not Xzibit, you can't pull my hoe card." The two rappers squashed their issues shortly after, and appeared together on the song "California Vacation" on The Game's second album, Doctor's Advocate. In October 2019, the two rappers received a platinum plaque for their song "Bitch Please" which they celebrated on Instagram.

In early-to-mid 2002, Kurupt had re-signed with Death Row, which Snoop Dogg and Daz Dillinger viewed as betrayal. Snoop responded to this with the lyric "Your rappers and artists, tell 'em to shut it up / 'Cause I'll fuck every last one of 'em up, especially Kurupt." Snoop did, however, refer to Kurupt as his "homie" in the very next bar. Snoop expanded on this in an interview with Contrabandit: "He’s still my homeboy, though. So I can’t really throw no lashes at Kurupt. I just wanted to check him and let him know. The song is called “Pimp Slap” and it is there for a reason cause everybody who I spoke on needed to get slapped. It ain’t that I don’t love ‘em, it’s just that niggas needed to get checked."

The lyric "Cause you the biggest star on your label / And them other niggas just crumbs off my table" was seen as an attack on the artists currently signed to Death Row at the time, one of whom was Crooked I. Crooked took the diss personally, and responded with 3 tracks: "Fa Shizzle Killer," "Slap Back" and "Quit Snitching." Snoop and Crooked squashed their issues years later, and Snoop went on to appear on a special episode of Crooked I's podcast, Crook's Corner.

== Music video ==
The music video was directed by Pook Brown and features Snoop Dogg smoking marijuana with a group of Crips. It also features a cameo by Daz Dillinger.

== Controversy ==
On March 24, 2003, a lawsuit was filed against Snoop Dogg by a man who claimed that his life was endangered after the rapper had included a 50-second phone message featuring the plaintiff's voice on "Pimp Slapp'd". The man, identified only as John Doe for security reasons, had left the voice message for Snoop Dogg in October 2002, unaware of the intention of its inclusion on the album. John Doe, who was identified on the answering machine as "Jim Bob", insisted the album be recalled and cancelled for distribution in its current form, and stated in court papers that he had been threatened verbally several times and feared for his and his mother's lives due to Knight's Mob Piru Bloods affiliation and close proximity, as he resided in Compton, California, a city Suge has close ties to, at the time.

On February 3, 2004, the lawsuit was dismissed for common law appropriation of voice and intentional infliction of emotional distress, under the ruling that privacy cannot be maintained while leaving a message on another's recording device.

== Accolades ==
Music magazine Complex chose the song as the number 41 best diss in music history.
