= Old School (2003 film) =

2003 film by Todd Phillips

- Theatrical release poster
- Directed by: Todd Phillips
- Screenplay by: Todd Phillips; Scot Armstrong
- Story by: Court Crandall; Todd Phillips; Scot Armstrong
- Produced by: Daniel Goldberg; Joe Medjuck; Todd Phillips
- Starring: Luke Wilson; Will Ferrell; Vince Vaughn; Ellen Pompeo; Juliette Lewis; Leah Remini; Perrey Reeves; Craig Kilborn; Jeremy Piven
- Cinematography: Mark Irwin
- Edited by: Michael Jablow
- Music by: Theodore Shapiro
- Production company: The Montecito Picture Company
- Distributed by: DreamWorks Pictures (United States and Canada); United International Pictures (International)
- Release date: February 21, 2003
- Running time: 90 minutes
- Country: United States
- Language: English
- Budget: $24 million
- Box office: $87.1 million

Old School is a 2003 American comedy film directed and co-written by Todd Phillips. The film stars Luke Wilson, Will Ferrell, and Vince Vaughn as depressed men in their thirties who seek to relive their college days by starting a fraternity, and the tribulations they encounter in doing so. Old School was produced by The Montecito Picture Company and released by DreamWorks Pictures on February 21, 2003. The film received mixed reviews from critics, and grossed $87.1 million worldwide on a $24 million budget.

== Plot ==
Returning home early from a business trip, real estate attorney Mitch Martin walks in on his girlfriend Heidi hosting an orgy and breaks up with her. At his friend Frank's wedding, Mitch makes an awkward impression on his high school crush, Nicole, and soon moves into a house near Harrison University campus in Upstate New York.

Mitch's friend Bernard throws a hugely successful housewarming party dubbed Mitch-a-Palooza. A drunken Frank is seen streaking by his wife Marissa and her friends, straining their new marriage, while Mitch wakes up in bed with Darcie, a teenage girl he later learns is his boss's daughter and a high school senior. Kicked out by Marissa after a disastrous couple's therapy session, Frank moves in with Mitch.

The friends are visited by an acquaintance and former college classmate they used to ridicule: Gordon Pritchard, now the college dean, who has had the house rezoned exclusively for campus housing. Exploiting a university loophole, Bernard turns the house into a fraternity open to anyone, and the friends carry out hazing events throughout campus, much to Pritchard's displeasure.

Mitch walks in on Nicole's boyfriend, Mark, kissing a woman at a birthday party for one of Bernard's children. Elderly World War II-veteran fraternity brother Blue dies of a heart attack during a "KY lube wrestling" match with two college girls at his birthday celebration, and at the funeral, Marissa asks Frank for a divorce.

Pritchard bribes student council president Megan Huang, promising to get her into Columbia Law School in exchange for revoking the fraternity's charter. Nicole confronts Mitch after Mark lies that he caught Mitch with the woman at the party instead, and a chance run-in with Darcie complicates Mitch's attempt to explain. Pritchard has the fraternity evicted, placing the students in the now unsanctioned fraternity at risk of expulsion.

Mitch determines they can bypass Pritchard's ruling if all members complete various assessments to prove their legitimacy. Frank defeats James Carville in a debate session, and the fraternity cheats their way through an exam with the help of Mitch's co-workers. In the school spirit evaluation, the fraternity loses points when Frank, dressed as the school mascot, unsuccessfully jumps through a ring of fire.

Megan confronts Pritchard for reneging their deal, and the fraternity faces their final athletics challenge. A badly burned Frank gives an intense rhythmic gymnastics performance, Bernard manages to complete the rings routine, and Weensie, an obese member chosen by Pritchard, executes a perfect vault landing. The fraternity triumphs, but Pritchard gives them a failing score by accounting for the absence of the late Blue. Megan provides a tape recording of Pritchard admitting to bribery, and after a chase across campus, Frank recovers the tape.

Pritchard is arrested and fired, and the fraternity's charter is reinstated. They move into Pritchard's former residence. Nicole visits Mitch as he leaves the old fraternity house, revealing that she dumped Mark after catching him cheating. They reconcile, Mitch and Bernard returning to their everyday lives while Frank assumes fraternity leadership.

In a mid-credits scene, Mark drives off a bridge and lands on a fly-fishing Pritchard as the car explodes. Blue, who is in Heaven, plays "Dust in the Wind" on the piano. Frank meets Heidi, who invites him to a "get-together," and he enthusiastically accepts.

== Cast ==
- Luke Wilson as Mitch "The Godfather" Martin
- Will Ferrell as Frank "The Tank" Ricard
- Vince Vaughn as Bernard "Beanie" Campbell
- Jeremy Piven as Dean Gordon "Cheese" Pritchard
- Ellen Pompeo as Nicole
- Juliette Lewis as Heidi
- Leah Remini as Lara Campbell
- Perrey Reeves as Marissa Jones
- Craig Kilborn as Mark
- Elisha Cuthbert as Darcie Goldberg
- Harve Presnell as Mr. Springbrook
- Artie Lange as Booker
- Matt Walsh as Walsh
- Patrick Fischler as Michael
- Sara Tanaka as Megan Huang
- Sarah Shahi as Erica
- Seann William Scott as Peppers
- Todd Phillips as Gang Bang Guy
- Bryan Callen as Avi, the Waiter
- Snoop Dogg as himself
- James Carville as himself
- Warren G as himself
- Kokane as himself
- Terry O'Quinn as Goldberg (uncredited)
- Andy Dick as Oral Sex Instructor (uncredited)
- Bishop Don "Magic" Juan as himself
- Ashley Jones as Caterer
- Arthur Taxier as Professor
- The Dan Band as Wedding band

=== The pledges ===
- Patrick Cranshaw as Joseph "Blue" Pulaski
- Jerod Mixon as Weensie
- Rick Gonzalez as Spanish
- Matthew Carey as Hatch
- Simon Helberg as Jerry
- Abdul Goznobi as Abdul
- Eddie Pepitone as Archer
- Robert Corddry as Warren
- Charles Noland as Beav
- Raymond Ma as Mr. Ma
- Jesse Heiman as Budnick
- Jose Gonzales as Gonzo
- Patrick J. Adams as Patch
- Jake Jarvi as Jarvi

== Production ==
At the 1998 Sundance Film Festival, Todd Phillips premiered the documentary Frat House to acclaim, winning the Grand Jury Prize in the Documentary category with co-director Andrew Gurland. Ivan Reitman, who had produced the fraternity house comedy Animal House, saw the documentary and wanted to collaborate with Phillips to revive the frat comedy film genre. The first film from Reitman and Phillips's partnership was the 2000 DreamWorks comedy release Road Trip, which was also the first collaboration between screenwriter Scot Armstrong and Phillips. The success of Road Trip prompted Armstrong and Phillips to pitch Reitman on a fraternity-themed film centered around adult men instead of the usual college-aged kids. Said Armstrong, "There's a weird brotherhood that happens when you're in college were you're kind of finding yourself, and it was funny to think of old people doing it."

Old School was filmed in and around La Crescenta, California from January 7, 2002, until March 18, 2002. Filming locations included Palisades High School, UCLA, USC and Harvard University. The film is considered a forerunner to the Frat Pack since three of its stars—Ferrell, Vaughn, and Wilson—are core members of that group.

== Reception ==
=== Critical response ===
Old School received mixed reviews. On Rotten Tomatoes, the film has an approval rating of 60% based on reviews from 161 critics, with an average score of 5.8/10. The website's consensus states, "While not consistently funny, the movie does have its moments." On Metacritic, it has a score of 54 out of 100 based on reviews from 32 critics, indicating "mixed or average reviews". Audiences surveyed by CinemaScore gave the film a grade B+ on a scale of A to F.

Elvis Mitchell of The New York Times called it a "sloppy, dumb, though occasionally funny comedy," comparing it to "a half-empty glass of Coke that's been sitting out for a couple of days; sure, it looks like cola, but one sip tells you exactly what's missing." He called out both Phillips and co-executive producer Ivan Reitman for rehashing their previous works and accused the latter of self-plagiarism by saying that the film was "so derivative of Animal House (and, more specifically, its children) that it's like one of those by-the-numbers imitative movies Homer Simpson is so obsessed with." Mitchell added that Phillips "comes even closer than Mr. Reitman to stealing from himself." Mitchell praised Ferrell for using "his hilarious, anxious zealotry to sell the part" and Cuthbert who "hijacks the handful of scenes she has."

Roger Ebert gave the film one out of four stars and stated, "This is not a funny movie, although it has a few good scenes and some nice work by Ferrell as an apparently compulsive nudist." Variety called it "This year's kinder, gentler Animal House."

=== Box office ===
The film grossed $17,453,216 in 2,689 theaters in its opening weekend at the U.S. box office, opening at #2 behind Daredevil which was on its second week at the top spot. Old School grossed receipts of $75,585,093 in the U.S. and Canada and $11,550,427 in international markets for a total of $87,135,520 worldwide.

=== Awards ===
- Artios Awards (2003) - nominated for Best Casting for Feature Film
- MTV Movie Awards (2003) - nominated for Best Comedic Performance (for Will Ferrell, losing to Mike Myers for Austin Powers in Goldmember) and for Best On-Screen Team (Ferrell, Vaughn, Wilson)
- Taurus Awards (2003) - nominated for Best Fire Stunt
- Spike Guys' Choice Awards (2012) - won for Guy Movie Hall of Fame

== Home media ==
Old School was released on VHS and DVD in both rated and unrated versions on June 10, 2003, by DreamWorks Home Entertainment. It received a Japanese DVD release on June 23, 2004, via Geneon Universal Entertainment.

The unrated version of the film was released on Blu-ray, by Paramount Home Entertainment on December 16, 2008. The unrated Blu-ray was released in Australia on August 20, 2009. Paramount later added the film to their free streaming service Pluto TV.

== Soundtrack ==
At the Mitch-a-Palooza party, Snoop Dogg and Kokane perform "Paper'd Up", sampling Eric B & Rakim's track "Paid in Full". The soundtrack also includes "Fun Night" by Andrew W.K., "Dust in the Wind" by Kansas, "Hungry Like the Wolf", "The Farmer in the Dell", "Gonna Make You Sweat", "Louie Louie" by Black Flag, "Chariots of Fire", "Good Lovin' Gone Bad", "Master of Puppets" by Metallica, "Playground in My Mind" by Clint Holmes and "The Sound of Silence" by Simon & Garfunkel. The main song in this movie is "Here I Go Again" by Whitesnake, which is played when Will Ferrell's character is fixing his car and in the closing credits. Also, The Dan Band sings one of the famous songs of Bonnie Tyler, "Total Eclipse of the Heart" (with some interesting improvisational departures as to the cover's lyrics), and Styx's "Lady". During the introductory sequence Ryan Adams' "To Be Young (Is to Be Sad, Is to Be High)", co-written with David Rawlings, can be heard most memorably during the metal detector scene.

The film received no soundtrack album tie-in by DreamWorks Records or any other label.

== Canceled sequel ==
In 2006, a sequel, titled Old School Dos, was written by Scot Armstrong but was turned down by original stars, Will Ferrell and Vince Vaughn. The story concerned the aging fraternity going to spring break. While promoting Semi-Pro in 2008, Ferrell had this to say about the defunct project: "I read [the script]. Some super funny set pieces, but I don't know. I think Vince [Vaughn] had the same reaction. We’re just kind of doing the same thing again. It was like us going to Spring Break, but we’ve got to find this guy who's the head of a fraternity. Once again, funny things but it's just us once again back in a fraternity setting. It just felt like it was repeating. But watch, I'm over-thinking it."
