= Paper'd Up =

Song by Snoop Dogg featuring Kokane & Traci Nelson

from the album Paid tha Cost to Be da Bo$$
- Genre: West Coast hip-hop; Gangsta rap
- Length: 3:50
- Label: Doggystyle; Priority; Capitol
- Songwriters: Calvin Broadus; Dennis Lambert; Duane Hitchings; Eric Barrier; Franne Golde; Farid Nassar; William Griffin, Jr.; Jerry Long, Jr.; Traci Nelson
- Producer: Fredwreck

"Paper'd Up" is a song by American West Coast hip hop recording artist Snoop Dogg, taken from his six studio album, Paid tha Cost to Be da Bo$$ (2002). It was produced by Fredwreck and features guest appearances by Kokane and Traci Nelson. The beat, drum breaks and harmonies are heavily sampled from Dennis Edward's 1984 Disco Classic "Don't Look Any Further" featuring Siedah Garrett. The oriental vocal sample is from Ofra Haza's song Im Nin'alu. This combination of sample material was already employed by Eric B. & Rakim in 1987 for their dancefloor classic Paid In Full, which was made famous by Coldcut 's Seven Minutes of Madness Remix. The song was featured in the 2003 comedy film Old School, which Snoop Dogg and Kokane performing the song in Mitch's party scene.

== Charts ==
=== Weekly charts ===
Chart (2002)	Peak position
France (SNEP)	58
