= List of Billboard 200 number-one albums of 1998 =

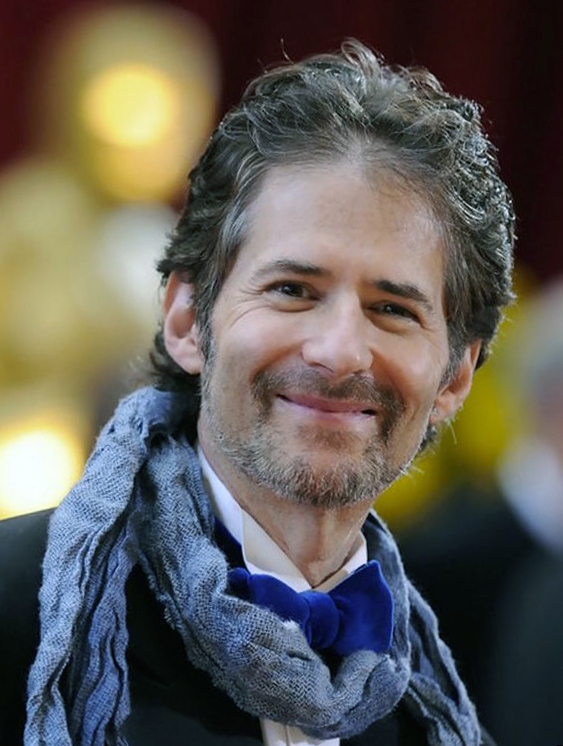
Titanic: Music from the Motion Picture by James Horner was the best-selling album of 1998, and the highest-selling primarily orchestral film score in Billboard history.

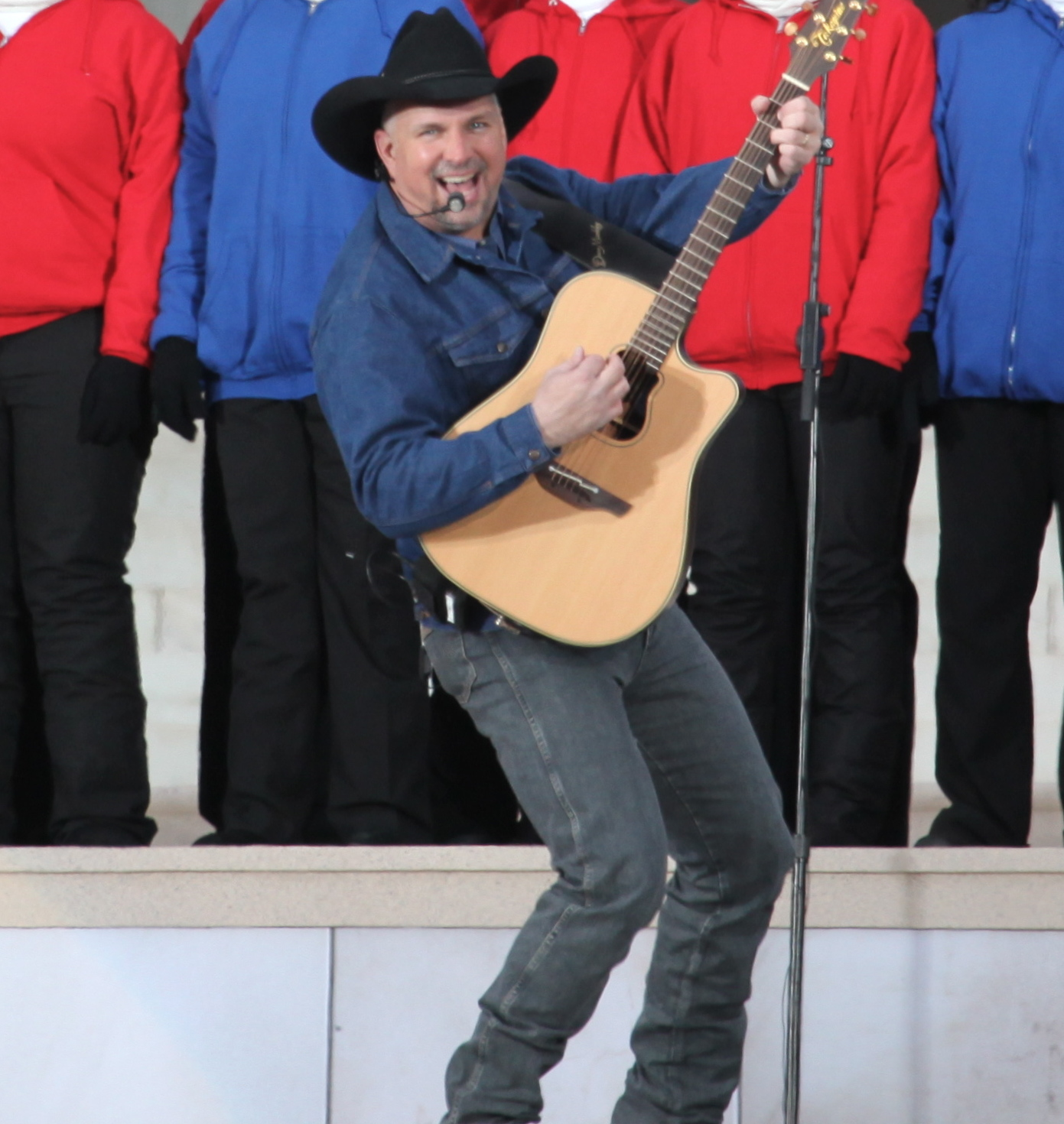
Double Live by Garth Brooks had the biggest sales week of 1998, selling over 1 million copies in its first week.

The Billboard 200, published in Billboard magazine, is a weekly chart that ranks the 200 highest-selling music albums and EPs in the United States. This data is compiled by Nielsen SoundScan from a universe of merchants that represents more than 90% of the U.S. music retail market. The sample includes music stores and the music departments at electronics and department stores, as well as direct-to-consumer transactions and internet sales.

== Chart history ==
Key
†	Indicates best performing album of 1998

Issue date	Album	Artist(s)	Label	Sales	Ref.
January 3	Sevens	Garth Brooks	Capitol	678,000	
January 10	Sevens	Garth Brooks	Capitol	684,000	
January 17	Let's Talk About Love	Celine Dion	550 Music	284,000	
January 24	Titanic: Music from the Motion Picture †	James Horner / Soundtrack	Sony Classical	243,000	
January 31	Titanic: Music from the Motion Picture †	James Horner / Soundtrack	Sony Classical	419,000	
February 7	Titanic: Music from the Motion Picture †	James Horner / Soundtrack	Sony Classical	664,500	
February 14	Titanic: Music from the Motion Picture †	James Horner / Soundtrack	Sony Classical	582,500	
February 21	Titanic: Music from the Motion Picture †	James Horner / Soundtrack	Sony Classical	588,000	
February 28	Titanic: Music from the Motion Picture †	James Horner / Soundtrack	Sony Classical	847,500	
March 7	Titanic: Music from the Motion Picture †	James Horner / Soundtrack	Sony Classical	562,000	
March 14	Titanic: Music from the Motion Picture †	James Horner / Soundtrack	Sony Classical	505,000	
March 21	Titanic: Music from the Motion Picture †	James Horner / Soundtrack	Sony Classical	477,511	
March 28	Titanic: Music from the Motion Picture †	James Horner / Soundtrack	Sony Classical	448,000	
April 4	Titanic: Music from the Motion Picture †	James Horner / Soundtrack	Sony Classical	454,000	
April 11	Titanic: Music from the Motion Picture †	James Horner / Soundtrack	Sony Classical	476,000	
April 18	Titanic: Music from the Motion Picture †	James Horner / Soundtrack	Sony Classical	390,000	
April 25	Titanic: Music from the Motion Picture †	James Horner / Soundtrack	Sony Classical	410,000	
May 2	Titanic: Music from the Motion Picture †	James Horner / Soundtrack	Sony Classical	268,000	
May 9	Titanic: Music from the Motion Picture †	James Horner / Soundtrack	Sony Classical	184,000	
May 16	Before These Crowded Streets	Dave Matthews Band	RCA	421,000	
May 23	The Limited Series	Garth Brooks	Capitol	372,410	
May 30	The Limited Series	Garth Brooks	Capitol	190,000	
June 6	It's Dark and Hell Is Hot	DMX	Ruff Ryders	251,391	
June 13	City of Angels	Soundtrack	Warner Sunset	165,000	
June 20	MP Da Last Don	Master P	No Limit	495,000	
June 27	MP Da Last Don	Master P	No Limit	217,000	
July 4	City of Angels	Soundtrack	Warner Sunset	169,000	
July 11	City of Angels	Soundtrack	Warner Sunset	145,000	
July 18	Armageddon: The Album	Soundtrack	Columbia	184,000	
July 25	Armageddon: The Album	Soundtrack	Columbia	236,000	
August 1	Hello Nasty	Beastie Boys	Grand Royal	681,572	
August 8	Hello Nasty	Beastie Boys	Grand Royal	315,000	
August 15	Hello Nasty	Beastie Boys	Grand Royal	244,000	
August 22	Da Game Is to Be Sold Not to Be Told	Snoop Dogg	No Limit	519,000	
August 29	Da Game Is to Be Sold Not to Be Told	Snoop Dogg	No Limit	246,000	
September 5	Follow the Leader	Korn	Immortal	268,000	
September 12	The Miseducation of Lauryn Hill	Lauryn Hill	Ruffhouse	422,624	
September 19	The Miseducation of Lauryn Hill	Lauryn Hill	Ruffhouse	265,000	
September 26	The Miseducation of Lauryn Hill	Lauryn Hill	Ruffhouse	214,000	
October 3	Mechanical Animals	Marilyn Manson	Nothing	223,000	
October 10	The Miseducation of Lauryn Hill	Lauryn Hill	Ruffhouse	168,000	
October 17	Vol. 2... Hard Knock Life	Jay-Z	Roc-A-Fella	352,000	
October 24	Vol. 2... Hard Knock Life	Jay-Z	Roc-A-Fella	208,000	
October 31	Vol. 2... Hard Knock Life	Jay-Z	Roc-A-Fella	186,000	
November 7	Vol. 2... Hard Knock Life	Jay-Z	Roc-A-Fella	189,000	
November 14	Vol. 2... Hard Knock Life	Jay-Z	Roc-A-Fella	174,000	
November 21	Supposed Former Infatuation Junkie	Alanis Morissette	Maverick	469,054	
November 28	Supposed Former Infatuation Junkie	Alanis Morissette	Maverick	268,000	
December 5	Double Live	Garth Brooks	Capitol	1,085,000	
December 12	Double Live	Garth Brooks	Capitol	649,496	
December 19	Double Live	Garth Brooks	Capitol	423,332	
December 26	Double Live	Garth Brooks	Capitol	450,906	

== See also ==
- 1998 in music
- List of number-one albums (United States)
