= G Bedtime Stories =

Single by Snoop Dogg

from the album No Limit Top Dogg
- Released: February 6, 1999
- Recorded: 1998
- Genre: West Coast hip-hop; gangsta rap; G-funk
- Length: 2:14
- Label: No Limit
- Songwriter: Calvin Broadus
- Producer: Meech Wells

Snoop Dogg singles chronology
| "Unify" (1998) | "G Bedtime Stories" (1999) | "Cali Chronic" (1999) |

"G Bedtime Stories" is a song by American rapper Snoop Dogg. It was released on February 6, 1999, as the first single of his fourth studio album No Limit Top Dogg, with the record label No Limit Records.

== Music video ==
The music video was directed by Gee Bee.

== Track listing ==
- CD single
1. G Bedtime Stories (Radio Version) — 3:23
2. G Bedtime Stories (Instrumental) — 3:23

== Personnel ==
- Snoop Dogg - primary artist
- Meech Wells - producer
- Master P - executive producer
