= Rollin' wit Dana Dane =

Studio album by Dana Dane
- Released: March 28, 1995
- Recorded: 1994–1995
- Studio: Track Record Studios (North Hollywood, CA); Backroom Studios (Burbank, CA); Milagro Studios (Glendale, CA); Red Zone Studio (Burbank, CA)
- Genre: Hip hop
- Length: 47:52
- Label: Maverick
- Producer: 3rd Rail; DJ Battlecat; Smash Money

Dana Dane chronology
Dana Dane 4 Ever (1990)	Rollin' wit Dana Dane (1995)	Best of Dana Dane (2002)

Singles from Rollin' wit Dana Dane
- 1. "Record Jock" Released: November 29, 1994; 2. "Rollin' Wit Dane" Released: March 21, 1995; 3. "Chester" Released: July 5, 1995

Rollin' wit Dana Dane is the third and final studio album by the American rapper Dana Dane. It was released on March 28, 1995 via Maverick Records. Recording sessions took place at Track Record Studios in North Hollywood, Backroom Studios in Burbank and Milagro Sound Recorders in Glendale, with additional recording at Red Zone Studio in Burbank. Production was handled by DJ Battlecat, 3rd Rail and Smash Money.

The album debuted at number 42 on the US Top R&B/Hip-Hop Albums. It was supported with three singles: "Record Jock", "Rollin' wit Dane" and "Chester". Its lead single, "Record Jock", peaked at No. 61 on the Hot R&B/Hip-Hop Songs and No. 11 on the Hot Rap Songs. The album's second single, "Rollin' wit Dane", made it to No. 77 on the Hot R&B/Hip-Hop Songs and No. 25 on the Hot Rap Songs. The third single from the album, "Chester", a song about child sexual abuse, was not charted.

== Critical reception ==
Professional ratings
Review scores
Source	Rating
AllMusic	3/5 stars
The Charlotte Observer	2/4 stars
Pittsburgh Post-Gazette	2.5/4 stars
RapReviews	5/10

The Pittsburgh Post-Gazette wrote that Dane's "brand of softcore is imaginative at times, but suffers from fragile, home-grown synth beats that lack the verve of real instruments". The Charlotte Observer thought that "Dana's trippin' on wax now, searching for a beat, and even Battlecat (the dude that produced Domino and 2Pac) couldn't help him regain his seat".

== Track listing ==
No.	Title	Writer(s)	Producer(s)	Length
1.	"Dedication"		DJ Battlecat	2:09
2.	"Once Again"	Dana McCleese; Devin Copeland; Kevin Gilliam	DJ Battlecat	3:55
3.	"In da Mix"	McCleese; Eric Black; P. Foster	3rd Rail	4:17
4.	"Rollin' Wit Dane"	McCleese; Gilliam; Rick James	DJ Battlecat	4:21
5.	"Booty Call"	McCleese	DJ Battlecat	1:33
6.	"Record Jock"	McCleese; Gilliam; Greyson Salmon; Howard Williams Johnson	DJ Battlecat	4:06
7.	"Ain't No Love (Interlude)"		3rd Rail	0:44
8.	"Chester"	McCleese; Gilliam	DJ Battlecat; Dana Dane (co.)	3:51
9.	"Nina"	McCleese; Gilliam; Roy Daheny	DJ Battlecat	4:27
10.	"Mama Told Me"	McCleese; Foster; J. Wright	Smash Money	4:52
11.	"Show Me Love"	McCleese; Gilliam	DJ Battlecat	4:00
12.	"Fort Greene (S)Killz"	McCleese; Lady Terra; Foster; Ike Capone; Gap Da Ripper; Black	3rd Rail	5:07
13.	"Ain't No Love"	McCleese; Michael Harris; Black	3rd Rail	4:30
Total length:				47:52

Sample credits

- Track 2 contains samples from "Nightmares" and "Cinderfella" performed by Dana Dane.
- Track 11 contains elements from the composition "Wait for Me" written by Mark Adams, Steve Arrington, Charles Carter and Daniel Webster.

== Personnel ==
- Dana "Dane" McCleese – vocals, co-producer (track 8), arrangement & mixing (tracks: 2–4, 6, 8–13), executive producer, sleeve notes
- Michael Maggoty – backing vocals (tracks: 2, 9)
- Mikey Young – backing vocals (track 2)
- Sang Banton – backing vocals (track 2)
- Howard Johnson – backing vocals (tracks: 8, 11, 13), album coordinator, A&R assistant
- Lil Dana Dane – backing vocals (track 11)
- Cymoen Simien – additional backing vocals (track 8)
- Heather Larson – additional backing vocals (track 8)
- Tiffany Schirmer – additional backing vocals (track 8)
- William "Overdose" Moore – guitar & drum programming (track 3)
- Stan "The Guitar Man" Jones – guitar (tracks: 4, 11, 12), bass (tracks: 4, 11)
- David Cochrane – flute (track 4)
- Leonard Jones – midi programming (tracks: 3, 12, 13)
- Kevin "DJ BattleCat" Gilliam – producer (tracks: 1, 2, 4–6, 8, 9, 11), mixing (tracks: 2, 4, 6, 8, 9, 11)
- 3rd Rail – producer (tracks: 3, 7, 12, 13), mixing (tracks: 12, 13)
- Smash Money – producer (track 10)
- Ulysses Noriega – recording (track 2), recording assistant (tracks: 4, 8, 10, 11)
- Eric White – recording (track 2), recording assistant (tracks: 4, 8, 10, 11)
- Lance Pierre – recording (track 2), recording assistant (tracks: 4, 8, 10, 11)
- Audie C. – recording (track 2), recording assistant (tracks: 4, 8, 10, 11)
- Todd Elhart – recording (track 3)
- George Gallegos – recording (tracks: 4, 6, 8, 9, 10, 11)
- Ovis – recording (tracks: 12, 13)
- Rob Chiarelli – mixing (tracks: 2–4, 6, 8–10, 13)
- Paul Arnold – mixing (tracks: 11, 12)
- Manny Marroquin – additional mixing (track 12)
- John Matousek – mastering
- Lydia Harris – executive producer, A&R, sleeve notes
- Andre Harris – executive producer
- Kevin Hosmann – art direction
- Tim Alexander – photography
- Oscar Williams – production coordinator

== Charts ==
Chart (1995)	Peak position
US Top R&B/Hip-Hop Albums (Billboard)	42
