= Just Dippin' =

Song by Snoop Dogg featuring Dr. Dre and Jewell

from the album No Limit Top Dogg
- Released: 1999
- Genre: West Coast hip-hop; gangsta rap; G-funk
- Length: 4:03
- Label: No Limit; Priority
- Songwriters: Calvin Broadus; Andre Young; Jamarr Stamps; Ricardo Brown; Brian Bailey; Jewell Caples
- Producers: Dr. Dre; Master P (exec.)

"Just Dippin'" is song by American West Coast hip-hop recording artist Snoop Dogg, taken from his fourth studio album, No Limit Top Dogg (1999). It was produced by Dr. Dre and features guest appearances by Dr. Dre and Jewell. This is the first time they collaborated since Doggystyle and Dr. Dre's The Chronic.

== Track listing ==
- CD single
1. Just Dippin' (Radio Version) (featuring Dr. Dre and Jewell) — 4:02
2. Just Dippin' (Instrumental Version) — 4:03
- Vinyl Remix
1. Just Dippin' (Remix) (Radio Version) — 3:51
2. Just Dippin' (Remix) (Instrumental Version) — 4:15
3. Just Dippin' (Remix) (Club Mix) — 4:15
4. Just Dippin' (Remix) (A Cappella Version) — 4:13
