= Snoopafella =

Song by Snoop Dogg

from the album No Limit Top Dogg
- Released: 1999
- Genre: West coast hip hop, gangsta rap, southern rap
- Length: 5:22
- Label: No Limit
- Songwriter(s): Calvin Broadus
- Producer(s): Ant Banks

"Snoopafella" is a song by American rapper Snoop Dogg, taken from Snoop Dogg's fourth studio album No Limit Top Dogg (1999). The song was written by Snoop Dogg, with production handled by Ant Banks. The song heavily samples "Cinderfella Dana Dane" by Dana Dane, which in turn heavily samples "Dazz" by Brick.

== Charts ==
Chart (1999)	Peak position
US Bubbling Under R&B/Hip-Hop Singles (Billboard)	16
