= Still a G Thang =

1998 single by Snoop Dogg

Single by Snoop Dogg

from the album Da Game Is to Be Sold, Not to Be Told
- Released: August 18, 1998
- Recorded: 1997
- Genre: G-funk
- Length: 4:20
- Label: No Limit; Priority
- Songwriter: Calvin Broadus
- Producer: Meech Wells

Snoop Dogg singles chronology
"Only in California" (1997)	"Still a G Thang" (1998)	"Come and Get with Me" (1998)

Music video
- "Still a G Thang" on YouTube

"Still a G Thang" is a song by American rapper Snoop Dogg. It was released on August 18, 1998 as the first single of his third studio album Da Game Is to Be Sold, Not to Be Told, with the record labels; No Limit Records and Priority Records. It was produced by Meech Wells. It is the sequel to the 1992 hit single "Nuthin' but a 'G' Thang", which appears on Dr. Dre's debut solo album, The Chronic (1992).

== Music video ==
The video is also the soundtrack for Snoop Dogg's 1998 short film Da Game of Life. The video features rapper Master P and scenes from the motion picture, with both the film and video directed by Michael Martin.

The single contains the edited radio version and the "street version" of the song, as well as the instrumental and a bonus track called "Full Fledged Pimpin".

== Lyrics ==
Parts of the song are reminiscent of the earlier song, "Nuthin' but a 'G' Thang", and has a part where Snoop Dogg parodies a part of the song with the lyrics from Nuthin' but a 'G' Thang, "Death Row is the label that pays me" is recited, but replaced with "No Limit is the label that pays me", to update his new record label, No Limit Records and other parts of the song contain subtle references to "Nuthin' but a 'G' Thang".

== Charts ==
=== Weekly charts ===
Chart (1998)	Peak position
US Billboard Hot 100	19
US Hot R&B/Hip-Hop Songs (Billboard)	16
US Hot Rap Songs (Billboard)	3
US Rhythmic Airplay (Billboard)	36

=== Year-end charts ===
Chart (1998)	Peak position
US R&B/Hip-Hop Songs (Billboard)	99
