= Bitch Please =

1999 single by Snoop Dogg featuring Xzibit and Nate Dogg

Single by Snoop Dogg featuring Xzibit & Nate Dogg

from the album No Limit Top Dogg
- Released: April 29, 1999
- Recorded: 1998
- Genre: West Coast hip-hop; gangsta rap; G-funk
- Length: 3:54
- Label: No Limit; Priority
- Songwriters: Calvin Broadus; Alvin Joiner; Nathaniel Hale
- Producer: Dr. Dre

Snoop Dogg singles chronology
"Cali Chronic" (1999)	"Bitch Please" (1999)	"Chin Check" (1999)

Xzibit singles chronology
"Pussy Pop" (1999)	"Bitch Please" (1999)	"Game Don't Wait" (1999)

Nate Dogg singles chronology
"Pussy Pop" (1999)	"Bitch Please" (1999)	"Game Don't Wait" (1999)

Music video
- "Bitch Please" on YouTube

"Bitch Please", also known as "Trick Please" for the amended radio version, or "B**** Please" and "B Please" for clean versions, is a song by Snoop Dogg featuring Nate Dogg and Xzibit from his fourth album, No Limit Top Dogg. Its music video was directed by Dr. Dre and Phillip Atwell. A sequel song, "Bitch Please II", was for Eminem's third studio album, The Marshall Mathers LP and featured all previous artists in addition to Dr. Dre and Eminem.

There were three edited versions of the song based on the content with radio stations to choose between playing "Trick Please" or the edited version of "Bitch Please", one had amended lyrics, and another had the profanity muted as well as the sex moaning background sound and the second half of the word "doggystyle" in Snoop Dogg's 2nd verse. In addition, the original clean album version had the profanity backmasked since "Trick Please" wasn't released until The Best of Snoop Dogg album in 2006.

== Charts ==
=== Weekly charts ===
Chart (1999)	Peak position
Switzerland (Schweizer Hitparade)	48
US Billboard Hot 100	77
US Hot R&B/Hip-Hop Songs (Billboard)	26
US Rhythmic Airplay (Billboard)	30

=== Year-end charts ===
Chart (1999)	Peak position
US R&B/Hip-Hop Songs (Billboard)	98

== Certifications ==
Region	Certification	Certified units/sales
New Zealand (RMNZ)	Platinum	30,000^{‡}
^{‡} Sales+streaming figures based on certification alone.
