= Paid tha Cost to Be da Boss =

2002 studio album by Snoop Dogg

Studio album by Snoop Dogg
- Released: November 26, 2002
- Recorded: 2001–2002
- Studios: Doggystyle Records Studio, Diamond Bar, Los Angeles, California
- Genre: Hip-hop
- Length: 78:58
- Labels: Doggy Style; Priority
- Producers: Bigg Snoop Dogg (exec.); Battlecat; Daz Dillinger; DJ Premier; E-Swift; Fredwreck; Hi-Tek; Keith Clizark; Jelly Roll; Josef Leimberg; Just Blaze; L.T. Hutton; Meech Wells; The Neptunes

Snoop Dogg chronology
Death Row: Snoop Doggy Dogg at His Best (2001)	Paid tha Cost to Be da Boss (2002)	The Hard Way (2004)

Singles from Paid tha Cost to Be da Boss
- 1. "From tha Chuuuch to da Palace" Released: October 15, 2002; 2. "Beautiful" Released: January 21, 2003

Paid tha Cost to Be da Boss (stylized as Paid tha Cost to Be da Bo$$) is the sixth studio album by American rapper Snoop Dogg. It was released on November 26, 2002, by his Doggy Style Records label and it was distributed by Priority Records. This is first album following his departure from No Limit Records. The album was supported by two singles, both featuring Pharrell: "From tha Chuuuch to da Palace" and "Beautiful", the latter also featuring Charlie Wilson.

The album debuted at number 12 on the US Billboard 200, selling 174,000 copies in its first week, and received platinum certification by the Recording Industry Association of America (RIAA). To date, it has sold over 1,500,000 copies worldwide.

== Music ==
This album marked the beginning of Snoop's long-lasting association with Pharrell and The Neptunes. The album's lead single "From tha Chuuuch to da Palace", produced by The Neptunes and featuring an uncredited guest appearance from Pharrell, was released on October 15, 2002. The song's music video was directed by Diane Martel, under the alias Bucky Chrome.

The album's second single, "Beautiful" featuring Pharrell and Charlie Wilson, also produced by The Neptunes, was released on January 28, 2003. The music video for "Beautiful", which featured Pharrell but omitted Charlie Wilson, was directed by Chris Robinson in Brazil, which helped the single to become a hit on the Billboard's charts. In a retrospective critique on the song, Pharrell would later admit he didn't think the song would be a hit. "[Snoop] really loved ‘Beautiful.’ I didn’t get ‘Beautiful,’ mainly because I was singing on there flat as fuck and I just didn’t hear it. I thought it was a fun record. And then we put Charlie Wilson on it and I was like man Charlie sounding amazing on this, and this feels good to me, but no one is ever going to go for this."

== Release ==
It was announced to be re-packaged for the album, with six of these pre-released versions of different album covers, but only several tracks were not to be included on each. Snoop's also contains two-disc's DVD, called Boss Playa: A Day in the Life of Bigg Snoop Dogg; including the first disc featuring three music videos for "Boss Playa", "Pimp Slapp'd" (where both of them, were directed by Pook Brown), and "That's the Shit"; the second disc is a DVD, named "Doggystyle Porn", which features the song, titled "You Like Doin It Too". However, these tracks were later featured in an unreleased project version of the album.

== Critical reception ==
Professional ratings
Aggregate scores
Source	Rating
Metacritic	76/100
Review scores
Source	Rating
AllMusic	4.5/5 stars
Blender	4/5 stars
Entertainment Weekly	A−
Los Angeles Times	3/4 stars
NME	8/10
RapReviews	8.5/10
Rolling Stone	3/5 stars
Spin	8/10
Stylus	A−
Vibe	3/5 stars

- Rolling Stone - 3 stars out of 5 - "Snoop stretches his silky flow over tracks by underground ace Hi-Tek and the unstoppable Neptunes."
- Spin - 8 out of 10 - "The most spirited pop record of his career....Paid Tha Cost is Snoop unleashed."
- Entertainment Weekly - "Snoop is reborn, a gangsta rap granddaddy in recline." - Rating: A−
- Uncut - 3 stars out of 5 - "He treads a line between loving monogamy and club bangers, emphasizing accessibility throughout."
- Vibe - 3.5 out of 5 - "His wordplay is still as nimble and quick as ever, giving the beats a beat down with newfound urgency."

== Commercial performance ==
Paid tha Cost to Be da Boss debuted at number 12 on the US Billboard 200, selling 174,000 copies in its first week. In November 2004, the album sales, where it has sold 1,210,000 copies in the United States.

== Controversy ==
On March 24, 2003, a lawsuit was filed against Snoop Dogg by a man who claimed that his life was endangered after the rapper had included a 50-second phone message featuring the plaintiff's voice on the album's last track, "Pimp Slapp'd", a diss track directed at then-Death Row Records CEO Suge Knight. The man, identified only as John Doe for security reasons, had left the voice message for Snoop Dogg in October 2002, unaware of the intention of its inclusion on the album. John Doe, who was identified on the answering machine as "Jim Bob", insisted the album be recalled and cancelled for distribution in its current form, and stated in court papers that he had been threatened verbally several times and feared for his and his mother's lives due to Knight's Mob Piru Bloods affiliation and close proximity, as both he and Knight resided in Compton, California, at the time.

On February 3, 2004, the lawsuit was dismissed for common law appropriation of voice and intentional infliction of emotional distress, under the ruling that privacy cannot be maintained while leaving a message on another's recording device.

== Track listing ==
No.	Title	Writer(s)	Producer(s)	Length
1.	"Don Doggy"			0:42
2.	"Da Bo$$ Would Like to See You"	Calvin Broadus, Jr.; Eric Brooks; Nickolas Ashford; Valerie Simpson	E-Swift	1:59
3.	"Stoplight"	Broadus, Jr.; David "Jelly Roll" Drew; George Worrell, Jr.; William Collins; George Clinton, Jr.	Jelly Roll	4:26
4.	"From tha Chuuuch to da Palace" (featuring Pharrell)	Broadus, Jr.; Pharrell Williams; Chad Hugo; Robert Kelly	The Neptunes	4:40
5.	"I Believe in You" (featuring LaToiya Williams)	Broadus, Jr.; LaToiya Williams; Tony Cottrell	Hi-Tek	4:34
6.	"Lollipop" (featuring Jay-Z, Nate Dogg, and Soopafly)	Broadus, Jr.; Shawn Carter; Nathaniel Hale; Priest Brooks; Justin Smith	Just Blaze	3:48
7.	"Ballin'" (featuring The Dramatics and Lil' ½ Dead)	Broadus, Jr.; Larry Reynolds; Ron Banks; Tony Hester; Donald "Lil' ½ Dead" Smith; Kevin Gilliam	DJ Battlecat	5:19
8.	"Beautiful" (featuring Pharrell and Charlie Wilson)	Broadus, Jr.; Williams; Charlie Wilson; Hugo	The Neptunes	4:58
9.	"Paper'd Up" (featuring Kokane and Traci Nelson)	Broadus, Jr.; Jerry Long, Jr.; Traci Nelson; Farid Nassar; Dennis Lambert; Duane Hitchings; Franne Golde; Eric Barrier; William Griffin, Jr.	Fredwreck	3:49
10.	"Wasn't Your Fault"	Broadus, Jr.; Lenton Hutton; James Harris III; Terry Lewis	L.T. Hutton	4:30
11.	"Bo$$ Playa"	Broadus, Jr.; Nassar; Clarence Satche; Donald Campbell; Tyrone Crum; Keith Harrison; Ralph Aikens; Robert Neal, Jr.; Roger Parker; Shy Felder	Fredwreck	5:53
12.	"Hourglass" (featuring Kokane and Goldie Loc)	Broadus, Jr.; Long, Jr.; Keiwan Spillman; Drew; Gregory Johnson; Larry Blackmon	Jelly Roll	4:20
13.	"The One and Only"	Broadus, Jr.; Christopher Martin; Clinton, Jr.; Alvin Joiner; Andre Young; Brian Bailey; Charles Glenn; David Axelrod; David Spradley; Eric Sadler; François de Roubaix; Garry Shider; Keith Boxley; Leo Graham; Lorenzo Patterson; Melvin Bradford; O'Shea Jackson; Tracy Marrow	DJ Premier	3:49
14.	"I Miss That Bitch" (featuring E-White)	Broadus, Jr.; Eric White; Cottrell; Jerry Butler; Marvin Yancy	Hi-Tek	3:12
15.	"From Long Beach 2 Brick City" (featuring Redman, Nate Dogg, and Warren G)	Broadus, Jr.; Reggie Noble; Hale; Warren Griffin III; Nassar; Harry Wayne Casey; Tom Browne; Adrian Sear	Fredwreck	3:43
16.	"Suited n Booted"	Broadus, Jr.; Keith "Clizark" Clark; Cecil Womack, Jr.; Mallia Franklin	Keith Clizark; Meech Wells (co.)	3:16
17.	"You Got What I Want" (featuring Goldie Loc, Ludacris, and Charlie Wilson)	Broadus, Jr.; Spillman; Christopher Bridges; Wilson; Drew	Jelly Roll	3:36
18.	"Batman & Robin" (featuring The Lady of Rage and RBX)	Broadus, Jr.; Robin Allen; Eric Collins; Martin; Neal Hefti	DJ Premier	5:02
19.	"A Message 2 Fat Cuzz"			1:40
20.	"Pimp Slapp'd"	Broadus, Jr.; Josef Leimberg; Bernard Edwards; Nile Rodgers; Worrell, Jr.; Collins; Clinton, Jr.; David Blake; Norman Durham	Leimberg	5:42
Total length:				78:58

France edition bonus track
No.	Title	Writer(s)	Producer(s)	Length
21.	"Mission Cleopatra" (featuring Jamel Debbouze)	Broadus, Jr.; Jamel Debbouze; Delmar Arnaud	Daz Dillinger	3:51

=== Sample credits ===
- "Da Bo$$ Would Like to See You" contains a sample from "It's My House" as performed by Diana Ross.
- "Stoplight" contains a sample from "Flashlight" as performed by Parliament.
- "From tha Chuuuch to da Palace" contains a sample from "Buffalo Gals" as performed by Malcolm McLaren.
- "Ballin'" contains a sample from "Fell for You" as performed by The Dramatics.
- "Paper'd Up" samples "Paid in Full" as performed by Eric B. & Rakim, and "Don't Look Any Further" as performed by Dennis Edwards.
- "Wasn't Your Fault" contains a sample from "I Didn't Mean to Turn You On" as performed by Cherrelle.
- "Bo$$ Playa" contains a sample from "Riding High" as performed by Faze-O.
- "Hourglass" contains a sample from "I Just Want to Be" as performed by Cameo.
- "The One and Only" contains a sample from "It's You, It's You" as performed by Tyrone Davis.
- "I Miss That Bitch" contains a sample from "I'm Your Mechanical Man" as performed by Jerry Butler.
- "From Long Beach 2 Brick City" contains a sample from "Wikka Wrap" as performed by The Evasions.
- "Batman & Robin" contains a sample from "Batman" as performed by TeeVee Toons, Inc.
- "Pimp Slapp'd" samples "Rapper's Delight" as performed by Sugarhill Gang, "Tonite" as performed by DJ Quik, "Flashlight" as performed by Parliament, and "Streets Is Watching" as performed by Jay-Z.

== Personnel ==
Credits adapted from AllMusic.

- Dave Aron - engineer, mixing
- B-Real - congas
- DJ Battlecat - producer
- Daniel Betancourt - assistant
- Joe Ceballos - coloring
- Keith Clark - producer
- Andrew Coleman - engineer
- Snoopy Collins - background vocals
- Hi-Tek - producer
- DJ Premier - producer
- Nate Dogg - vocals
- The Dramatics - vocals
- E-Swift - producer
- Shy Felder - background vocals, vocals
- Warren G - vocals
- Brian Gardner - mastering
- Goldie Loc - vocals
- Mamie Gunn - background vocals
- Robin Hill - sample clearance
- Brian Horton - flute
- Chad Hugo - instrumentation
- Richard Huredia - mixing
- L.T. Hutton - producer
- Jay-Z - vocals
- Jelly Roll - background vocals, mixing, producer
- Eric Johnson - bass
- Just Blaze - producer
- Ronnie King - hammond organ
- The Lady of Rage - vocals
- Josef Leimberg - producer
- Ken Lewis - mixing
- Lil' ½ Dead - vocals
- Quazedelic - background vocals
- Ludacris - vocals
- Anthony Mandler - photography
- Kokane - vocals
- Fredwreck - fender rhodes, flute, mixing, moog synthesizer, producer, sequencing
- Traci Nelson - background vocals, vocals
- The Neptunes - producer
- James Rainey - sample clearance
- RBX - vocals
- Redman - vocals
- Eric Roinestad - art direction
- Eddie Sancho - mixing
- Chris Sholar - guitar
- Snoop Dogg - primary artist, sequencing
- Soopafly - vocals
- Nancie Stern - sample clearance
- Dexter Thibou - assistant engineer
- Patrick Viala - mixing
- Meech Wells - producer
- LaToiya Williams - vocals
- Marlon Williams - guitar
- Pharrell Williams - instrumentation, vocals
- Charlie Wilson - vocals
- Christian Olde Wolbers - bass
- The Redd Brothers (Dwayne & Daniel) - mixing

== Charts ==
=== Weekly charts ===
Weekly chart performance for Paid tha Cost to Be da Boss
Chart (2002–2003)	Peak position
Australian Albums (ARIA)	55
Australian Urban Albums (ARIA)	11
Belgian Albums (Ultratop Flanders)	48
Canadian Albums (Nielsen SoundScan)	34
Canadian R&B Albums (Nielsen SoundScan)	8
Danish Albums (Hitlisten)	27
Dutch Albums (Album Top 100)	50
French Albums (SNEP)	17
German Albums (Offizielle Top 100)	46
New Zealand Albums (RMNZ)	27
Swiss Albums (Schweizer Hitparade)	48
UK Albums (Official Charts Company)	64
UK R&B Albums (Official Charts Company)	14
US Billboard 200	12
US Top R&B/Hip-Hop Albums (Billboard)	3

=== Year-end charts ===
2002 year-end chart performance for Paid tha Cost to Be da Boss
Chart (2002)	Position
Canadian R&B Albums (Nielsen SoundScan)	46
Canadian Rap Albums (Nielsen SoundScan)	23

2003 year-end chart performance for Paid tha Cost to Be da Boss
Chart (2003)	Position
US Billboard 200	60
US Top R&B/Hip-Hop Albums (Billboard)	20

== Certifications ==
Region	Certification	Certified units/sales
Canada (Music Canada)	Gold	50,000^{^}
France (SNEP)	Gold	100,000^{*}
United Kingdom (BPI)	Gold	100,000^{^}
United States (RIAA)	Platinum	1,210,000
^{*} Sales figures based on certification alone.^{^} Shipments figures based on certification alone.
