= Dana Dane 4 Ever =

Studio album by Dana Dane
- Released: 1990
- Recorded: 1990
- Genre: Hip hop
- Label: Profile
- Producers: Hurby Luv Bug; the Invincibles; Stevie "O" the Boy Wonda

Dana Dane chronology
| Dana Dane with Fame (1987) | Dana Dane 4 Ever (1990) | Rollin' Wit Dana Dane (1995) |

Dana Dane 4 Ever is the second album by the rapper Dana Dane. It was released in 1990 on Profile Records.

The album was not as successful as Dane's debut, peaking at No. 150 on the Billboard 200 and No. 23 on the Top R&B/Hip-Hop Albums.

== Production ==
The album contains production from Hurby Luv Bug, the Invincibles, and Stevie "O" the Boy Wonda.

== Critical reception ==
Professional ratings
Review scores
| Source | Rating |
|---|---|
| AllMusic | 3/5 stars |
| The Encyclopedia of Popular Music | 3/5 stars |
| The Rolling Stone Album Guide | 3/5 stars |

The Rolling Stone Album Guide deemed "What Dirty Minds U Have" probably Dane's best song, calling it a "blithe burlesque of risque rap that ribs both 2 Live Crew and its critics." Vibe called the album "mediocre."

== Track listing ==
1. "Dedication 2" - 0:46
2. "Dana Dane to It" - 3:52
3. "A Little Bit of Dane Tonight" - 5:12
4. "Tales from the Dane Side" - 5:16
5. "What Dirty Minds U Have" - 3:50
6. "Makes Me Wanna Sing" - 4:39
7. "Dana Dane 4-Ever" - 3:25
8. "Lonely Man" - 5:05
9. "Johnny the Dipper" - 4:15
10. "Something Special" - 4:50
11. "Bedie Boo" - 2:22
12. "Just Here to Have Fun" - 4:18

== Samples ==
A Little Bit of Dane Tonight

- "Get on the Good Foot" by James Brown
- "Impeach the President" by the Honey Drippers
- "Funky President" by James Brown
- "A Little Bit of Jazz" by Nick Straker Band

Tales from the Dane Side

- "Impeach the President" by the Honey Drippers
- "If You Want Me to Stay" by Sly & the Family Stone
