= Jewell (singer) =

American R&B singer and songwriter (1968–2022)

- Born: Jewel Lynn Caples; June 12, 1968; Chicago, Illinois, U.S.
- Died: May 6, 2022 (aged 53) New Rochelle, New York, U.S.
- Genres: R&B, West Coast hip-hop
- Occupation: Singer
- Instrument: Voice
- Years active: 1991–2022
- Label: Death Row

Jewel Lynn Caples (June 12, 1968 – May 6, 2022), professionally known as Jewell (jew-ELL), was an American singer and songwriter best known for her work with Death Row Records in the 1990s, including collaborations with artists including Dr. Dre, Snoop Dogg, and Tupac Shakur, for which she was regarded the "First Lady of Death Row Records". As a solo artist, Jewell gained success on the Billboard Hot 100 charts with her 1994 cover of "Woman to Woman".

== Career ==
=== 1992–1997: Early career and breakthrough ===
From 1992 to 1997, Jewell provided vocals on albums from various Death Row artists such as Dr. Dre (The Chronic), Snoop Dogg (Doggystyle), and 2Pac (All Eyez on Me), in addition to motion picture soundtracks produced by the label. Her biggest solo success was her 1994 cover of Shirley Brown's song "Woman to Woman", which peaked at #72 on the Billboard Hot 100 and #16 on the Hot R&B/Hip-Hop Songs chart.

=== 1998–2022: Departure from Death Row, My Blood My Sweat My Tears and final years ===
Jewell was among many artists who departed Death Row between 1998 and 1999 due to financial and legal issues involving CEO Suge Knight, and her singing career wound down in the 2000s. In October 2011, she published the memoir My Blood My Sweat My Tears, in which she claimed that her past association with Knight prevented her from gaining another recording deal. An accompanying soundtrack to the book was released.

== Health issues and death ==
Caples was hospitalized in 2019 after she stopped breathing and collapsed while shopping at a Walmart, with the cause not made public. In an October 2021 interview, she said that she was given six months to live, and hurried to release her final album, Love + Pain = Musik, as a result. Caples was hospitalized twice in March 2022 due to a self-described "lung injury illness", during which she had eight pounds of fluid removed from her heart, legs and lungs. She died at age 53 on May 6, 2022.

== Discography ==
=== Studio albums ===
Title	Album details	Peak chart positions	
Title	Album details	US 200	US R&B
Black Diamond	Released: November 22, 2011; Label: WIDEawake Entertainment/Death Row; Format: CD	—	—
Jewell	Released: 2011; Label: Death Row; Format: CD	—	—
Love + Pain = Musik	Released: October 2021; Label: So, Let's Talk Ltd; Format: Digital download	—	—
	"—" denotes releases that did not chart or receive certification.		

=== Compilation albums ===
Title	Album details	Peak chart positions	
Title	Album details	US 200	US R&B
My Blood My Sweat My Tears: The Soundtrack	Released: October 25, 2011; Label: WIDEawake Entertainment; Format: CD	—	—
	"—" denotes releases that did not chart or receive certification.		

=== Singles ===
==== As lead artist ====
Year	Single	Chart positions		Album
Year	Single	US	US R&B	Album
1992	"Love or Lust"	—	—	Deep Cover
1994	"Woman to Woman"	72	16	Murder Was the Case
1994	"Gonna Give It To Ya" (featuring Aaron Hall)	—	—	Above the Rim
"—" denotes releases that did not chart or receive certification.

==== As featured artist ====
Title	Year	Album
"For the Love of Money" (Yomo & Maulkie featuring Jewell)	1991	Are U Xperienced?
"Let Me Ride" (Dr. Dre featuring Snoop Dogg and Jewell)	1992	The Chronic
"Foe tha Love of $" (Bone Thugs-n-Harmony featuring Eazy-E and Jewell)	1994	Creepin on ah Come Up
"Thug Passion" (2Pac featuring Outlawz, Jewell and Storm)	1996	All Eyez on Me
"Body and Soul" (O.F.T.B. featuring Jewell)	1997	Gridlock'd
"Just Dippin'" (Snoop Dogg featuring Dr. Dre and Jewell)	1999	No Limit Top Dogg
"I Love TNO" (Won-G featuring Jewell [as Ju-L])	2001	No Better than This
