= From tha Chuuuch to da Palace =

Single by Snoop Dogg

from the album Paid tha Cost to Be da Boss
- Released: October 15, 2002
- Recorded: 2002
- Genre: G-funk
- Length: 4:40
- Label: Priority; Capitol
- Songwriters: Calvin Broadus; Pharrell Williams; Robert Kelly
- Producer: The Neptunes

Snoop Dogg singles chronology
"The Streets" (2002)	"From tha Chuuuch to da Palace" (2002)	"Beautiful" (2003)

Pharrell singles chronology
"When the Last Time" (2002)	"From tha Chuuch to da Palace" (2002)	"Beautiful" (2003)

Music video
- "From tha Chuuuch to da Palace" on YouTube

"From tha Chuuuch to da Palace" is a song by American rapper Snoop Dogg featuring Pharrell Williams from the former's sixth studio album Paid tha Cost to Be da Bo$$ (2002). Produced by The Neptunes (Williams and Chad Hugo), it contains re-sung elements from "Contagious" performed by The Isley Brothers. The song lyrics reference their lead singer Ron Isley. The music video was directed by Diane Martel and includes cameo appearances by Tony Cox, Tommy Davidson, Lauren London and rappers Soopafly, Goldie Loc, Uncle Junebug, Daz Dillinger and Warren G. The song was featured in the films Malibu's Most Wanted (which features a cameo appearance by Snoop Dogg himself) & 50 First Dates and video game MTV Music Generator 3.

== Music video ==
Two music videos were produced for the song, with the second one being the most common.

- In the first video, Snoop Dogg is seen performing the song at a house party.
- In the second video, a young Snoop Dogg fan (Malcolm David Kelley) gets a new Snoop Dogg action figure. His whole room is full of Snoop relics. As he opens the box and grabs the doll, its eyes begin sparkling, after which he drops it to the floor. Meanwhile, the real Snoop Dogg drives a car, but as the doll hits the ground he falls to the street from nowhere. It turns out that the toy is a real voodoo doll. As he starts to play with it and moves its arms, the real Snoop Dogg does the same. He first meets a group of ladies and unwillingly smacks and grabs at them. He then enters a barber shop in which the hairdresser (Soopafly) greets him, but as the fan keeps rotating the action figures arms. the real Snoop Dogg turns the room into a mess and cuts everyone's hair in a funny style. This is followed by an interlude where Snoop Dogg leaves the barber shop and confronts Harvey the policeman (played by Tommy Davidson) who wants to give him a parking ticket. They almost agree to let Snoop get away without a ticket when a midget officer arrives (Tony Cox) and orders the other officer to put Snoop Dogg in handcuffs. He hits him on his knees with a nightstick (the clean version has this moment cut out and filled the gap with Snoop falling on his knees in slow motion). Suddenly, a girl (Lauren London) walks by and attracts the attention of the officers, while Snoop Dogg escapes in his car. The interlude has music reference to "Nuthin' But a "G" Thang" and a snippet from the upcoming single "Beautiful". The child makes Snoop crash his car into a tree coincidentally next to the boy's house. Snoop Dogg's friends are already having a barbecue party in a nearby park and he joins them. The fan, who has seen the car crash, runs down to see what happened, and plays with the doll, which once again, causes trouble. Both Snoop and the fan realize that the doll is responsible for the troubles and Snoop takes it from him, and admires the doll's qualities ("This is sharp! I like this!"), then sends the kid on his way. In the outro members of the Snoop Dogg entourage give him shout-outs according to the repeated chorus "Snoop Dogg!".

== Charts ==
Chart (2002–03)	Peak position
Denmark (Tracklisten)	19
Germany (GfK)	75
Netherlands (Single Top 100)	97
Scottish Singles Sales (Official Charts)	36
UK Hip Hop/R&B (Official Charts)	8
UK Singles (Official Charts)	27
US Billboard Hot 100	77
US Hot R&B/Hip-Hop Songs (Billboard)	23
US Hot Rap Songs (Billboard)	16
US Hot Singles Sales (Billboard)	24
US Rhythmic Airplay (Billboard)	27
