= Beautiful (Snoop Dogg song) =

Single by Snoop Dogg featuring Pharrell and Uncle Charlie Wilson

from the album Paid tha Cost to Be da Boss
- Released: January 27, 2003
- Genre: Hip-hop
- Length: 4:58 (album version); 4:04 (radio edit)
- Label: Priority; Capitol
- Songwriters: Calvin Broadus; Pharrell Williams; Chad Hugo
- Producer: The Neptunes

Snoop Dogg singles chronology
"From tha Chuuuch to da Palace" (2002)	"Beautiful" (2003)	"It Blows My Mind" (2003)

Pharrell singles chronology
"From tha Chuuuch to da Palace" (2002)	"Beautiful" (2003)	"Excuse Me Miss" (2003)

Music video
- "Beautiful" on YouTube

"Beautiful" is a song by American rapper Snoop Dogg featuring American singers Pharrell Williams and Uncle Charlie Wilson. It was released on January 27, 2003, as the second single from Snoop Dogg's sixth studio album, Paid tha Cost to Be da Boss. The song was written by Snoop Dogg alongside producers the Neptunes (Williams and Chad Hugo). "Beautiful" reached number six on the US Billboard Hot 100 and number two on the Billboard Hot Rap Tracks chart. It was also successful in other countries such as Australia and New Zealand, peaking at number four in both countries. The music video was filmed in Rio de Janeiro, Brazil.

In 2024, the song appeared on Williams' soundtrack album Piece by Piece (Original Motion Picture Soundtrack).

== Music video ==
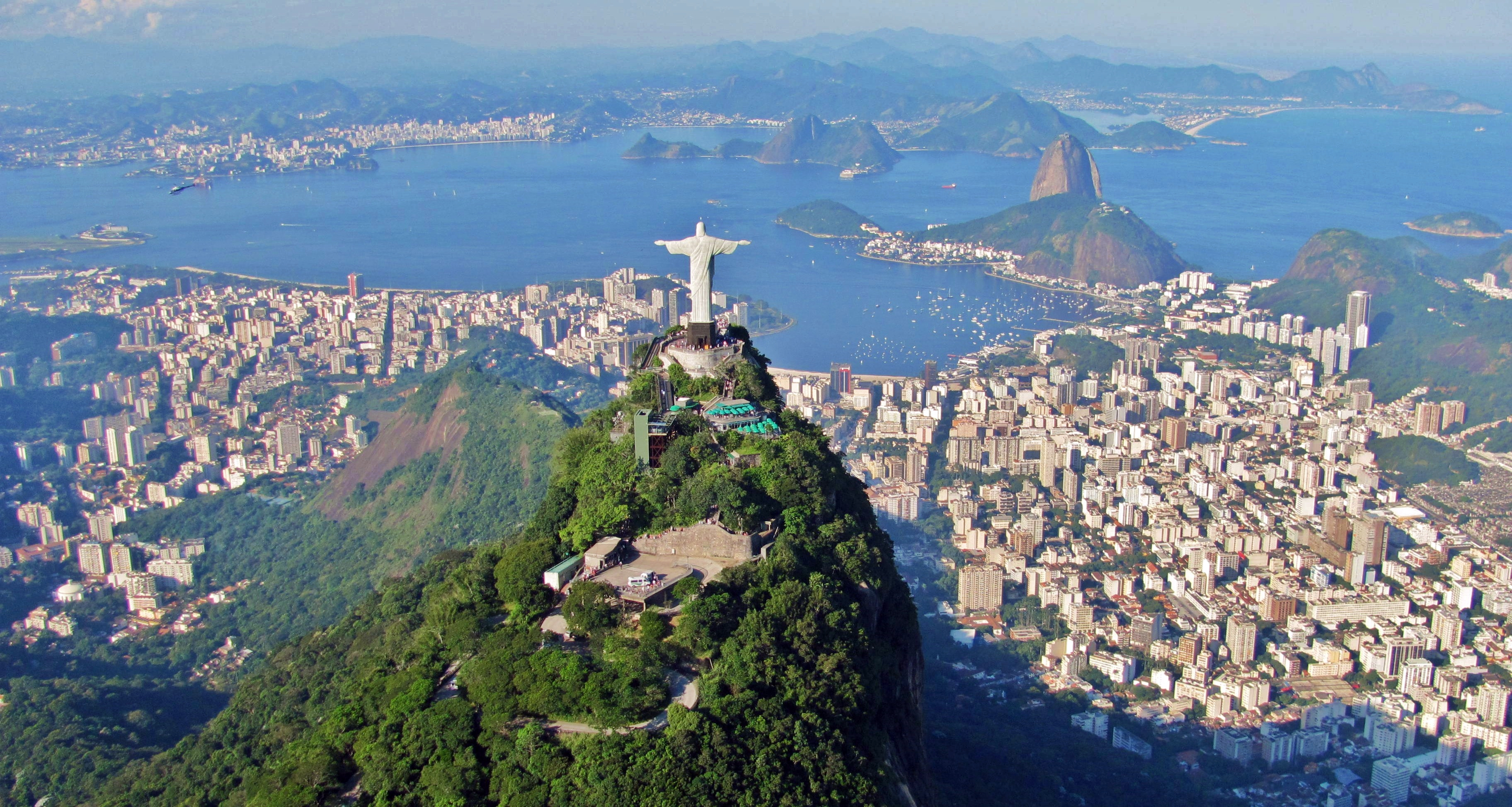
The music video was filmed in Rio de Janeiro.

The song "Beautiful"'s music video was directed by Chris Robinson of Partizan Entertainment, was produced by Karen Gainer and the production manager was Renata Chuquer. It reached the 6th spot on the LAUNCH Music Videos Top 100.

The first video set took place in Escadaria Selarón, Lapa district, Rio de Janeiro. The Brazil-colored yellow-green-blue stairways were fabricated by Selarón who started to upgrade the 125 metre, 215-step upwards street in 1990 and it had not been finished until the very day of the shooting. This stairway links the Rua Joaquim Silva in Lapa to the Rua Pinto Martins in Santa Teresa.

The second one is in Parque Lage in the grounds of a 1920s mansion between the Lagoa and the Botanic Gardens, at the base of the Corcovado. The scene features Brazilian actress/model, Michelle Martins as Snoop Dogg's love interest. Snoop is surrounded by a group of drummers, who play a long drum interlude that is not included in any radio, album or explicit edit of the song.

The third scene is on the Copacabana where Snoop is surrounded by the massive crowd of his fans in one of the segments while in another he and his friends are leaning on to his car and observing the local girls passing by.

During the video, Snoop Dogg wears a #31 Priest Holmes Chiefs jersey and a Lance Alworth jersey number 19.

== Awards ==
Grammy

Category	Genre	Song	Year	Result
Producer of the Year, Non-Classical (for The Neptunes)	Production and engineering	"Beautiful"	2004	Won
Best Rap Song (Snoop Dogg with Chad Hugo and Pharrell Williams)	Rap	"Beautiful"	2004	Nominated
Best Rap/Sung Collaboration (Snoop Dogg with Pharrell Williams and Charlie Wilson)	Rap	"Beautiful"	2004	Nominated

Other

Nominated for

- 2004 MVPA Video Awards
  - Best Hip-Hop Video
- 2003 MTV Video Music Awards
  - Best Hip-Hop Video
- 2003 Vibe Awards
  - Reelest Video
  - Hottest Hook
  - Coolest Collaboration

== Track listing ==
- CD single
1. "Beautiful" (Radio Edit) (featuring Pharrell & Uncle Charlie Wilson) — 4:04
2. "Beautiful" (Instrumental) — 4:21
3. "Ballin'" (Clean Version) (featuring The Dramatics & Lil' Half Dead) — 5:19
4. "Beautiful" (Vídeo) (Directed By Chris Robinson) — 5:27

=== Remixes ===
- A solo remix with Charlie Wilson was a part of Snoop Dogg's 2003 Welcome 2 tha Chuuuch Mixtape Vol. 2.
- A remix with 50 Cent and Lloyd Banks can be found on the 2003 mixtape G-Unit Radio Pt. 1: Smokin' Day 2.
- A freestyle used by Rick Ross to Atlanta rapper T.I. It can be found on YouTube.

== Personnel ==
- Produced by The Neptunes
- Recorded by Andrew Coleman
- Mixed by Pat Viala for Pat 'em Down Music
- Written by Calvin Broadus, Pharrell Williams, Chad Hugo
- Published by Chad Chase Music/EMI-Blackwood Music (ASCAP)/Waters of Nazareth Publishing/EMI-Blackwood Music (BMI); My Own Chit Music/EMI Blackwood Inc. (BMI)
- Pharrell appears courtesy of Virgin Records

== Charts ==
=== Weekly charts ===
Chart (2003)	Peak position
Australia (ARIA)	4
Australian Urban (ARIA)	2
Austria (Ö3 Austria Top 40)	19
Belgium (Ultratip Bubbling Under Wallonia)	14
Canada (Nielsen SoundScan)	47
Canada CHR (Nielsen BDS)	11
Denmark (Tracklisten)	14
France (SNEP)	39
Germany (GfK)	27
Ireland (IRMA)	41
Italy (FIMI)	17
Netherlands (Dutch Top 40)	12
Netherlands (Single Top 100)	13
New Zealand (Recorded Music NZ)	4
Switzerland (Schweizer Hitparade)	19
Scotland Singles (OCC)	37
UK Singles (OCC)	23
UK Hip Hop/R&B (OCC)	8
US Billboard Hot 100	6
US Hot R&B/Hip-Hop Songs (Billboard)	3
US Hot Rap Songs (Billboard)	2
US Pop Airplay (Billboard)	24
US Rhythmic Airplay (Billboard)	6

=== Year-end charts ===
Chart (2003)	Position
Australia (ARIA)	37
Netherlands (Dutch Top 40)	60
Netherlands (Single Top 100)	64
New Zealand (RIANZ)	9
Switzerland (Schweizer Hitparade)	72
UK Singles (OCC)	177
UK Urban (Music Week)	13
US Billboard Hot 100	42
US Hot R&B/Hip-Hop Singles & Tracks (Billboard)	15
US Hot Rap Tracks (Billboard)	12
US Rhythmic Top 40 (Billboard)	26

== Certifications ==
Region	Certification	Certified units/sales
Australia (ARIA)	Gold	35,000^{^}
New Zealand (RMNZ)	2× Platinum	60,000^{‡}
United Kingdom (BPI)	Gold	400,000^{‡}
^{^} Shipments figures based on certification alone.^{‡} Sales+streaming figures based on certification alone.

== Release history ==
Region	Date	Format(s)	Label(s)	Ref.
United States	January 27, 2003	Urban contemporary radio	Doggystyle; Priority; Capitol	
United Kingdom	March 24, 2003	12-inch vinyl; CD	Doggystyle; Priority	
Australia	March 31, 2003	CD	Doggystyle; Priority	

== See also ==
- List of Billboard Hot 100 top 10 singles in 2003
