= Da Game Is to Be Sold, Not to Be Told =

1998 studio album by Snoop Dogg

Studio album by Snoop Dogg
- Released: August 4, 1998
- Recorded: 1997–1998
- Genres: West Coast hip-hop; gangsta rap; G-funk
- Length: 79:28
- Labels: No Limit; Priority
- Producers: Master P (exec.); Beats by the Pound; DJ Pooh; Meech Wells; Snoop Dogg; Keith Clizark; Soopafly

Snoop Dogg chronology
Tha Doggfather (1996)	Da Game Is to Be Sold, Not to Be Told (1998)	No Limit Top Dogg (1999)

Singles from Da Game Is to Be Sold Not to Be Told
- 1. "Still a G Thang" Released: August 18, 1998; 2. "Woof" Released: October 26, 1998; 3. "Slow Down" Released: December 14, 1998

Da Game Is to Be Sold, Not to Be Told is the third studio album by American rapper Snoop Dogg (his first without Doggy in the middle of his name). It was released on August 4, 1998, by No Limit Records and Priority Records. It is his first album following his departure from Death Row Records in January 1998. It is the first Snoop Dogg album to have notable affiliates such as Dr. Dre, Nate Dogg, Warren G and others absent. It was also his first album to be released under a slight change to his stage name "Snoop Dogg" for contractual reasons.

== Background ==
In September 1996, shortly before the release of Snoop's second album Tha Doggfather, his friend and label-mate at Death Row Records, Tupac Shakur, was murdered in a drive-by shooting that many fans and other rappers believed to be a part of rising tensions between the East and West Coast hip-hop scenes.

In March 1997, noted East Coast rapper The Notorious B.I.G., popularly known as "Biggie Smalls", was also murdered in a drive-by shooting which was attributed by fans to the tensions between the coastal hip-hop scenes.

Snoop Dogg began to fear for his own safety due to the murders of Tupac and Biggie and also because Death Row Records was acknowledged by its artists in retrospect to be an unprofessional place during this time, with label founder Suge Knight incarcerated and many people with criminal pasts associated with the label.

In 1997, No Limit rapper Mystikal invited Snoop to be on his record Unpredictable on a song called "Gangstas" with label head Master P.

Snoop developed a good relationship with the No Limit rappers, and after another guest appearance on No Limit artist Silkk the Shocker's LP, Snoop was reported to have been signed to No Limit by Master P in March 1998. "Snoop Dogg is universal so he can fit into any camp-especially a camp that knows how to handmake shit," Snoop said at the time. "And, No Limit hand makes material. They make material fittin' to the artist and they know what type of shit Snoop Dogg is supposed to be on. That's why it's so tight."

== Singles ==
The lead single, "Still a G Thang," was released on July 3, 1998. It was produced by Meech Wells. It is the sequel to the 1992 hit single "Nuthin' but a 'G' Thang", which appears on Dr. Dre's debut solo album, The Chronic (1992). The song debuted at number 26 on the US Billboard Hot 100, marking the first Hot 100 entry as lead artist by Snoop since "Gin and Juice," in 1994. The song peaked at number 19 on the chart.

The second single, "Woof," featuring Mystikal and Fiend peaked at number 62 on the Billboard Hot 100.

== Critical reception ==
Professional ratings
Review scores
Source	Rating
AllMusic	1.5/5 stars
E! Online	B+
Entertainment Weekly	C
FFWD	2/5 stars
Iowa State Daily	3.5/5 stars
Los Angeles Times	3/4 stars
Robert Christgau	C+
Rolling Stone	2/5 stars
The Source	3.5/5 stars
Spin	5/10

The album featured mostly No Limit artists and was a departure from Snoop Dogg's first two albums which were strictly West Coast. Unlike his two previous two studio albums, Da Game Is to Be Sold, Not to Be Told received generally negative to moderate reviews with some noting it as one Snoop Dogg’s weaker albums. Q gave the album 3 out of 5 stars, saying, "Dogg's vocals can actually verge on the sublime....in glorious slow motion, and the undercurrent vibe is distinctly soulful."

Elliott Wilson of The Source gave it 3.5 mics out of 5, saying, "[f]ew MCs from the West have ever gotten as much acceptance and acclaim from outside regions... No Limit's latest soldier isn't trying to rock the boat with his third album... the vibrant vocalist is very happy to be with rap's top squad."

Anthony DeCurtis of Rolling Stone gave the album 2 out of 5 stars, saying that Snoop's work lacked the confidence and originality displayed on his earlier albums.

== Commercial performance ==
Da Game Is to Be Sold, Not to Be Told debuted at number one on the US Billboard 200 chart, selling 520,000 copies in its first week. It is Snoop Dogg's third consecutive number-one album in the United States. In its second week, the album remained at top on the Billboard 200, selling 246,000 copies. The album spent five consecutive weeks on the top ten of the Billboard 200. The album was certified 2× Platinum on October 22, 1998. On November 18, 1998, the album had sold 2.5 million copies in the United States, ranking as the 39th best-selling album of the year. As of March 2008, the album had sold over 4.4 million copies in the United States, making it the second best-selling album by Snoop Dogg in the country, behind only Doggystyle (1993).

== Track listing ==
No.	Title	Writer(s)	Producer(s)	Length
1.	"Snoop World" (featuring Master P)	C. Broadus; P. Miller; C.S. Lawson	KLC	5:20
2.	"Slow Down" (featuring Mia X)	C. Broadus; M. Young; O. Vickers; A. Thomas; J. Eugene; C. McIntosh; S. Nichol	O'Dell	4:10
3.	"Woof!" (featuring Mystikal and Fiend)	C. Broadus; R. Jones; M. Tyler	Craig B; Master P	4:22
4.	"Gin & Juice II"	C. Broadus	Carlos Stephens	3:36
5.	"Show Me Love"	C. Broadus; C. Wilson; M. Jordan	DJ Pooh	3:53
6.	"Hustle & Ball"	C. Broadus	O'Dell	3:26
7.	"Don't Let Go"	C. Broadus	DJ Darryl	3:47
8.	"Tru Tank Dogs" (featuring Mystikal)	C. Broadus; M. Tyler; C.S. Lawson	KLC	3:55
9.	"Whatcha Gon Do?" (featuring Master P)	C. Broadus; P. Miller	Master P	2:37
10.	"Still a G Thang"	C. Broadus	Meech Wells	4:20
11.	"20 Dollars to My Name" (featuring Fiend, Master P, Silkk the Shocker, and Soulja Slim)	C. Broadus; R. Jones; P. Miller; V. Miller; J. Tapp	Master P	4:09
12.	"D.O.G.'s Get Lonely 2" (featuring Jon B)	C. Broadus; T. Kelley; B. Robinson; J.D. Buck; M. Wells	Meech Wells; Snoop Dogg	3:15
13.	"Ain't Nut'in Personal" (featuring C-Murder and Silkk the Shocker)	C. Broadus; C. Miller; A. Sausa; V. Miller; C. Bazile	Craig B	3:37
14.	"DP Gangsta" (featuring C-Murder and Eddie Griffin)	C. Broadus; C. Miller; E. Griffin; C. Bazile; S. Arrington; L. Bonner; C.C. Carter; B. Hank; O. Jackson; R. Middlebrooks; W. Morrison; B. Napier; A. Noland; R. Parker; L. Patterson; M. Pierce; G. Webster; E. Wright; A. Young	Craig B	4:53
15.	"Game of Life" (featuring Steady Mobb'n)	C. Broadus; A. Sausa; C. Stephens	Carlos Stephens	3:52
16.	"See Ya When I Get There" (featuring C-Murder and Mystikal)	C. Broadus; C. Miller; M. Tyler; K. Clizark; M. Wells	Meech Wells; Keith Clizark	3:20
17.	"Pay for Pussy" (featuring Big Pimpin')	C. Broadus; D. Williams	Snoop Dogg	1:43
18.	"Picture This" (featuring Mia X)	C. Broadus; M. Young; C. Bazile	Craig B	2:31
19.	"Doggz Gonna Get Ya" (featuring Mac)	C. Broadus; M. Phipps; C.S. Lawson; A. Colandreo; L. Parker	KLC	4:59
20.	"Hoes, Money & Clout"	C. Broadus	Soopafly	3:21
21.	"Get Bout It & Rowdy" (featuring Master P)	C. Broadus; P. Miller; C.S. Lawson	KLC	4:22
Total length:				79:28

== Charts ==
=== Weekly charts ===
Chart (1998)	Peak position
Australian Albums (ARIA)	14
Austrian Albums (Ö3 Austria)	34
Canadian Albums (Billboard)	4
Canadian R&B Albums (SoundScan)	1
French Albums (SNEP)	44
German Albums (Offizielle Top 100)	24
New Zealand Albums (RMNZ)	11
Dutch Albums (Album Top 100)	39
Scottish Albums (Official Charts)	75
Swedish Albums (Sverigetopplistan)	34
Swiss Albums (Schweizer Hitparade)	50
UK Albums (Official Charts)	28
UK R&B Albums (OCC)	4
US Billboard 200	1
US Top R&B/Hip-Hop Albums (Billboard)	1

=== Year-end charts ===
Chart (1998)	Position
Canadian Albums (SoundScan)	121
Canadian R&B Albums (SoundScan)	17
US Billboard 200	42
US Top R&B/Hip-Hop Albums (Billboard)	12

== Certifications ==
Region	Certification	Certified units/sales
Canada (Music Canada)	Platinum	100,000^{^}
United Kingdom (BPI)	Silver	60,000^{^}
United States (RIAA)	2× Platinum	2,085,000
^{^} Shipments figures based on certification alone.

== See also ==
- Number-one albums of 1998 (U.S.)
- List of number-one R&B albums of 1998 (U.S.)
