= Dana Dane =

American rapper (born 1965)

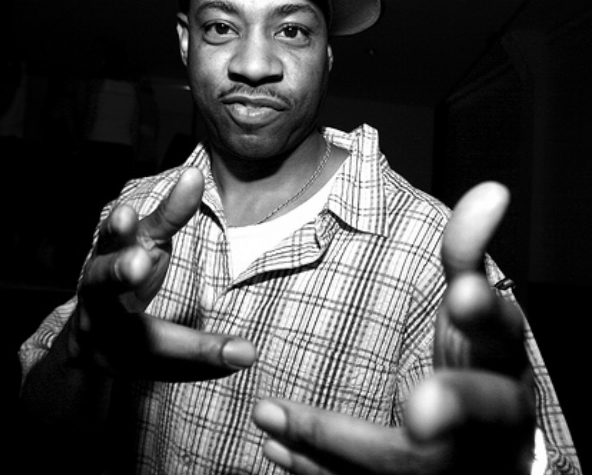
- Dane in September 2005

Background information
- Born: Dana McCleese; September 6, 1965 (age 60); Brooklyn, New York City, U.S.
- Genres: East Coast hip-hop
- Instrument: Rapping
- Years active: 1985–present
- Labels: Profile; Arista; BMG; Maverick; Warner Bros.

Dana McCleese (born September 6, 1965), better known by his stage name Dana Dane, is an American rapper known for performance of humorous lyrics and for his fashion sense.

== Early life ==
Dana was born in the Walt Whitman housing project in Fort Greene, Brooklyn, New York City, New York.

== Career ==
=== Recording artist ===
Dana Dane's career began as part of the Kangol Crew with fellow rapper Slick Rick, to whom he sounded markedly similar, although Slick Rick's English lilt was actually genuine, while Dana Dane's was an affectation. Dana Dane appeared in the video for Slick Rick's 1988 single "Teenage Love". After graduating from high school, he signed with Profile Records in 1985.

Dana Dane's debut album, Dana Dane with Fame, peaked at No. 46 on the Billboard album chart and was certified gold. His debut single was "Nightmares". His biggest hit in the United States was "Cinderfella Dana Dane", which peaked at No. 11 on Billboard magazine's R&B charts in 1987. Cheryl Green from Queens, NY sang backup. He was among Profile Records's core artists, then recorded briefly for Rap-A-Lot Records but did not release anything on that label. He released his last album, Rollin' Wit Dana Dane, in 1995 on Maverick Records.

=== Other activities ===
Dane operated a clothing boutique in New York City in the late 1980s and early 1990s. For six years, he was an on-air host for Sirius/XM Satellite Radio on its classic hip-hop channel LL Cool J's Rock the Bells radio (formerly BackSpin).

He makes a cameo appearance as himself in the 2002 film Brown Sugar.

In 2009, he released his first novel, Numbers (One World/Ballantine/Random House).

== Discography ==
=== Studio albums ===
List of albums, with selected chart positions
Title	Album details	Peak chart positions		Certifications
Title	Album details	US	US R&B /HH	Certifications
Dana Dane with Fame	Released: May 22, 1987; Label: Profile; Formats: CD, LP, cassette	46	2	RIAA: Gold
Dana Dane 4 Ever	Released: October 11, 1990; Label: Profile; Formats: CD, LP, cassette	150	23	
Rollin' wit Dana Dane	Released: March 28, 1995; Label: Maverick/Warner Bros. Records; Formats: CD, LP, cassette	—	42	
"—" denotes a recording that did not chart or was not released in that territory.

=== Compilation albums ===
List of compilation albums
Title	Album details
Best of Dana Dane	Released: March 26, 2002; Label: BMG Special Products; Formats: CD
Profile Singles	Released: July 31, 2020; Label: RCA; Formats: Digital download, streaming

=== Singles ===
List of singles, with selected chart positions
Title	Year	Peak chart positions			Album
Title	Year	US Bub.	US R&B	US Rap	Album
"Nightmares"	1985	—	21	—	Dana Dane with Fame
"Delancey Street"	1986	—	44	—	Dana Dane with Fame
"This be the Def Beat"	1987	—	30	—	Dana Dane with Fame
"Cinderfella Dana Dane"	1987	—	11	—	Dana Dane with Fame
"Dana Dane with Fame"	1987	—	—	—	Dana Dane with Fame
"Love at First Sight"	1988	—	—	—	Dana Dane with Fame
"Little Bit of Dane Tonight"	1990	—	53	17	Dana Dane 4 Ever
"Tales from the Dane Side"	1991	—	—	—	Dana Dane 4 Ever
"Record Jock"	1994	15	61	11	Rollin' wit Dana Dane
"Rollin' wit Dana Dane"	1995	18	77	25	Rollin' wit Dana Dane
"Chester"	1995	—	—	—	Rollin' wit Dana Dane
"Think Twice"	1997	—	—	—	Non-album singles
"What Up Love?"	1999	—	—	—	Non-album singles
"—" denotes a recording that did not chart or was not released in that territory.
