= Meech Wells =

American record producer

Meech Wells (born Cecil Demetrius Womack Jr.) is an American record producer. He works primarily on hip hop music, and has produced or co-produced for Snoop Dogg, Lil Romeo and Shaquille O'Neal.

== Biography ==
Before becoming Snoop's producer of choice during the late 1990s and early 2000s, Wells began his career as part of a funk band, Trey Lewd, that also featured Tracey Lewis, George Clinton's son; this provided Wells with the opportunity to work with Clinton himself. By 1993, Wells found himself working alongside Def Jef; the two's production on Shaquille O'Neal's "I Got Skillz" earned them some credentials. Throughout the mid-1990s, Wells continued to hone his craft, working on a number of remix projects before eventually being introduced to Snoop through a friend. Before long, the two were working together, beginning with "Still a G Thang," one of the songs on Snoop's Da Game Is to Be Sold, Not to Be Told. Wells produced a few No Limit songs featuring Snoop — Tru's "It's a Beautiful Thang," Silkk the Shocker's "Get It Up" — before playing a major role in bringing a West Coast sound to Snoop's No Limit Top Dogg album in 1999. In 2000, Wells reprised his role as one of Snoop's producers of choice, producing tracks for Tha Eastsidaz' self-titled debut and Doggy's Angels' Pleezbalevit, as well as on two tracks on Snoop's own Tha Last Meal ("Go Away," "Issues"). His mother was Motown Records singer Mary Wells

== Produced songs and collaborations ==
- "I Got Skillz" by Shaquille O'Neal (co-produced with Def Jef)
- 3/21 tracks on Da Game Is to Be Sold Not to Be Told by Snoop Dogg
- 6/22 tracks on No Limit Top Dogg by Snoop Dogg
- 4/22 tracks on Snoop Dogg Presents Tha Eastsidaz by Tha Eastsidaz
- 3/20 tracks on Duces 'N Trayz: The Old Fashioned Way by Snoop Dogg
- 2/19 tracks on Pleezbaleevit! by Doggy's Angels
- 2/19 tracks on Tha Last Meal by Snoop Dogg
- 2/17 tracks on Executive Decision by Bad Azz
- "Wanna Be Gangsta" by The Comrads Featuring Soul
- "Innocent Man" (West Coast Remix) by Mark Morrison ft. DMX, Eastwood & Kokane

== Filmography ==
- Unsung: Mary Wells (#6.11) (2011) TV Episode [Actor .... Himself]
- King's Ransom (2005) [Soundtrack] (writer: "Worst Nightmare")
- Hollywood Homicide (2003) [Soundtrack] (writer: "Bang This")
- What's the Worst That Could Happen? (2001) [Soundtrack] (writer: "F**k What They Say", "In-A-Zone Drama") (performer: "In-A-Zone Drama")

== Projects ==
- 1993 NBA Jam Session Various Artists Producer
- 1993 Shaq Diesel Shaquille O'Neal Producer
- 1994 Above the Rim Original Soundtrack Remixing
- 1996 Best of Shaquille O'Neal Shaquille O'Neal Producer
- 1997 It's a Groove (Jump, Stomp, Pomp, Romp) Hot Motion Mixing, Producer
- 1997 Bootyrama Hot Motion Mixing, Producer, Multi Instruments
- 1998 Da Game Is to Be Sold, Not to Be Told [Clean] Snoop Dogg Producer
- 1998 Game Is to Be Sold Not to Be Told Snoop Dogg Producer
- 1998 Black Mafia Steady Mobb'n Producer
- 1998 No Limit Soldiers Compilation: We Can't Be Stopped Various Artists Producer
- 1999 P.J.'s [Clean] Original TV Soundtrack Producer
- 1999 No Limit Top Dogg [Clean] Snoop Dogg Producer
- 1999 Who U Wit? No Limit All Stars Producer
- 1999 Da Crime Family Tru Producer
- 1999 Da Crime Family [Clean] Tru Producer
- 1999 Thicker Than Water Original Soundtrack Producer
- 1999 Thicker Than Water [Clean] Original Soundtrack Producer
- 1999 Hempin' Ain't Easy B-Legit Engineer, Producer
- 1999 Hempin' Ain't Easy B-Legit Producer, Engineer, Composer
- 2000 Tha Eastsidaz Snoop Dogg Producer
- 2000 Tha Eastsidaz Snoop Dogg Composer, Producer
- 2000 Tha Eastsidaz [Clean] Snoop Dogg Producer
- 2000 Wake Up & Ball The Comrads Producer
- 2000 Pleezbalevit Snoop Dogg Producer
- 2000 Tha Last Meal Snoop Dogg Producer
- 2000 Tha Last Meal Snoop Dogg Producer
- 2000 Tha Last Meal Snoop Dogg Producer, Composer
- 2000 Tha Last Meal Snoop Dogg Composer
- 2000 Tha Last Meal [Clean] Snoop Dogg Producer
- 2001 Oz Original TV Soundtrack Producer
- 2001 Brothers [2001] Original Soundtrack Producer, Keyboards
- 2001 Brothers [2001] Original Soundtrack Producer, Composer, Keyboards
- 2001 What's the Worst That Could Happen? Original Soundtrack A&R, Drum Programming, Instrumentation, Engineer, Producer
- 2001 Duces n' Trays: The Old Fashioned Way Tha Eastsidaz Producer
- 2001 Duces n' Trays: The Old Fashioned Way Tha Eastsidaz Producer
- 2001 Duces n' Trays: The Old Fashioned Way [Clean] Tha Eastsidaz Producer
- 2001 Chase the Cat Too Short Producer, Keyboards, Drum Programming
- 2002 Best of Nas Nas Remixing
- 2002 From Illmatic to Stillmatic: The Remixes [EP] Nas Remixing
- 2002 Snoop Dogg Presents Doggy Style Allstars: Welcome to tha House, Vol. 1 [Clean] Snoop Dogg Producer
- 2002 General's List Big Tray Deee Producer
- 2002 General's List [Clean] Big Tray Deee Producer
- 2002 Paid tha Cost to Be Da Bo$$ Snoop Dogg Producer
- 2002 Paid tha Cost to Be da Bo$$ [Clean] Snoop Dogg Producer
- 2003 DPGC: U Know What I'm Throwin' Up Daz Dillinger Composer, Producer
- 2003 DPGC: U Know What I'm Throwin' Up [Clean] Daz Dillinger Composer, Producer
- 2003 Executive Decision Bad Azz Producer
- 2004 Bugzy Bugzy Producer
- 2004 City 2 City Various Artists Producer
- 2004 Parallel Chico & Coolwadda Producer
- 2005 Best of Snoop Dogg Snoop Dogg Producer, Composer
- 2005 Best of Snoop Dogg Snoop Dogg Composer, Producer
- 2005 Best of Snoop Dogg [Clean] Snoop Dogg Producer
- 2006 Club Bangers Various Artists Producer
- 2007 G-Party [Circuit City Exclusive] Various Artists Composer
- 2011 Doggumentary Snoop Dogg Producer
- 2011 Doggumentary Snoop Dogg Producer
- 2011 Doggumentary [Clean] Snoop Dogg Producer
