= WC discography =

This is the discography of American rapper WC.

== Albums ==
=== Studio albums ===
List of albums, with selected chart positions
Title	Album details	Peak chart positions		
Title	Album details	US	US R&B	US Rap
The Shadiest One	Released: April 28 ,1998; Label: Payday, FFRR; Format: CD, LP, cassette, digital download	19	2	—
Ghetto Heisman	Released: November 12, 2002; Label: Def Jam; Format: CD, LP, cassette, digital download	46	7	—
Guilty by Affiliation	Released: August 14, 2007; Label: Lench Mob; Format: CD, digital download	49	6	5
Revenge of the Barracuda	Released: March 8, 2011; Label: E1 Music; Format: CD, digital download	132	40	20
"—" denotes a recording that did not chart.

=== Collaborative albums ===
Title	Album details
West Coast Gangsta Shit (with Daz Dillinger)	Released: June 19, 2013; Label: Dilly, Bigg Swang; Format: CD, digital download

== Mixtapes ==
Title	Mixtape details
West Side Heavy Hitter	Released: February 8, 2005; Label: Self-released; Format: Digital download

== Singles ==
=== As lead artist ===
List of singles, with selected chart positions, showing year released and album name
Title	Year	Peak chart positions					Album
Title	Year	US	US R&B	US Rap	IRE	UK	Album
"Just Clownin'"	1997	56	18	3	—	—	The Shadiest One
"Better Days" (featuring Ron Banks or Jon B.)	1998	64	33	4	—	—	The Shadiest One
"The Streets" (featuring Snoop Dogg and Nate Dogg)	2002	81	43	20	38	48	Ghetto Heisman
"Flirt" (featuring Case)	2003	—	97	—	—	—	Ghetto Heisman
"That's What I'm Talking About"	2010	—	—	—	—	—	Revenge of the Barracuda
"You Know Me" (featuring Ice Cube and Young Maylay)	2011	—	—	—	—	—	Revenge of the Barracuda
"—" denotes a recording that did not chart or was not released in that territory.

== Guest appearances ==
List of non-single guest appearances, with other performing artists, showing year released and album name
Title	Year	Other artist(s)	Album
"Color Blind"	1991	Ice Cube, Threat, Kam, Coolio, J-Dee	Death Certificate
"Quick Way Out"	1992	The MAAD Circle	Trespass (soundtrack)
"My Skin Is My Sin"	1994	Ice Cube	Bootlegs & B-Sides
"U Know Hoo!"	1994	Coolio	It Takes a Thief
"Get Up Get Down"	1995	Coolio, Malika, 40 Thievz, Shorty, Ras Kass	Gangsta's Paradise
"Hard Knox"	1997	J-Dubb, Otis, Shug	Big Thangs
"Walk With Me"	1997	CJ Mac	Southwest Riders
"Give It Up"	1997	—N/a	The Lawhouse Experience, Volume One
"510 / 213"	1997	Spice 1, Big Syke	The Black Bossalini
"Gang Related"	1997	CJ Mac, Daz Dillinger, Tray-Dee	Gang Related (soundtrack)
"Ridin' High"	1998	Daz Dillinger, CJ Mac	Retaliation, Revenge and Get Back
"Hoo-Ride 'N'"	1998	Binky Mac, Squeaky Ru, Boo Kapone, CJ Mac, Gangsta, K-Mac	Allfrumtha I
"Whatcha Gonna Do?" (Remix)	1998	Jayo Felony, Mack 10, Redman	Whatcha Gonna Do?
"My Hoodlumz & My Thugz"	1998	E-40, Mack 10	The Element of Surprise
"#1 Crew In the Area"	1998	Mack 10, K-Mac, Techniec, MC Eiht, CJ Mac, Boo Kapone, Binky Mac, Thump, G-Luv, Swamp Rat	The Recipe
"Militia" (Remix)	1998	Guru, Rakim	Belly (soundtrack)/Full Clip: Best of Gang Starr
"Hea"	1999	CJ Mac, Fat Joe	Platinum Game
"Ends"	1999	CJ Mac, Finale	Platinum Game
"Let It Reign"	1999	Ice Cube, Mack 10	Thicker than Water (soundtrack)
"Survival of the Fittest"	1999	Dresta, Young Shade	Thicker than Water (soundtrack)
"Fa Shiesty Cats"	1999	D.B.A., Kurupt	Doing Business As...
"Hell Yeah"	2000	Snoop Dogg	WWF Aggression
"Return of the Real Niggaz"	2000	Celly Cel	Deep Conversation
"Ride Till We Die"	2000	C-Bo	Enemy of the State
"In the Ghetto"	2000	T.W.D.Y., G-Stack, Otis, Shug	Lead the Way
"Get Your Walk On" (Remix)	2001	Xzibit, Daz Dillinger	N/A
"Fo' All Y'all"	2001	Caviar	Exit Wounds (soundtrack)
"Connectin' the Plots"	2001	Layzie Bone	Thug by Nature
"Dey Trippin'"	2001	Mr. Short Khop	Da Khop Shop
"Paper Trippin'"	2001	Nate Dogg	Rush Hour 2 (soundtrack)
"It's All the Same"	2001	D-Shot, Suga-T, B-Legit, E-40, Birdman	Money & Muscle
"Connected"	2001	Shaquille O'Neal, Nate Dogg	Shaquille O'Neal Presents His Superfriends, Vol. 1
"Young Locs Slow Down"	2001	Warren G, Butch Cassidy	The Return of the Regulator
"Connected for Life"	2001	Mack 10, Ice Cube	Bang or Ball
"Pop Lockin' II"	2002	Daz Dillinger, E-40, Goldie Loc, Master P, Silkk the Shocker, Snoop Dogg	West Coast Bad Boyz, Vol. 3: Poppin' Collars
"It's On"	2002	Koupsta	West Coast Bad Boyz, Vol. 3: Poppin' Collars
"I Ain't the One"	2002	Scarface	The Fix
"MJ Anthem"	2002	Montell Jordan	Montell Jordan
"N Full Motion"	2003	Boo-Yaa T.R.I.B.E.	West Koasta Nostra
"When the Guns Come Out"	2004	E-40, Christ Bearer	Blade: Trinity (soundtrack)
"Coast to Coast Gangstas"	2004	DJ Kay Slay, Joe Budden, Sauce Money, Killer Mike, Bun B& Hak Ditty	The Streetsweeper, Vol. 2
"Kill Game"	2004	Kokane	Mr. Kane, Pt. 2
"On Me"	2004	Kokane, Gangsta	Mr. Kane, Pt. 2
"Fly Like an Eagle"	2004	Snoop Dogg, Game	You Know What It Is, Vol. 2: Throwin' Rocks At the Throne
"Superstar (Amnesia)"	2005	Mitchy Slick	Urban Survival Syndrome
"Whip Yo' Ass"	2005	Nelly	The Longest Yard (soundtrack)
"Twist a Corner"	2005	King Tee	San Andreas: The Original Mixtape
"We Are the Streets"	2005	Papoose, Bun B, Maino	A Bootlegger's Nightmare
"All I Need"	2005	Game	You Know What It Is, Vol. 3
"My Lowrider"	2006	Techniec, E-40, Crooked I, Chingy, Lil Rob, Paul Wall, Game, Ice Cube	Stop Snitchin', Stop Lyin'
"L.A.N.Y."	2006	Smiley the Ghetto Child	The Antidote
"Chrome & Paint"	2006	Ice Cube	Laugh Now, Cry Later
"Spittin' Pollaseeds"	2006	Ice Cube, Kokane	Laugh Now, Cry Later
"If It Ain't Ruff"	2007	—N/a	Straight Outta Compton: 20th Anniversary Edition
"Reppin My Block (West Coast Mix)"	2007	Rob G	Reppin My Block: The Mixtape
"G Shit"	2007	Ice Cube	DJ Crazy Toones: The CT Experience
"Roll On 'Em"	2007	Xzibit, Young Maylay, MC Ren	DJ Crazy Toones: The CT Experience
"The Wait Is Over" (Remix)	2007	Damani	DJ Crazy Toones: The CT Experience
"This Life"	2007	Snoop Dogg	DJ Crazy Toones: The CT Experience
"It's Going Down"	2007		DJ Crazy Toones: The CT Experience
"We See You Niggas"	2007	Jayo Felony, Young Maylay	DJ Crazy Toones: The CT Experience
"Rock the Beat"	2008	Young Maylay	The Real Coast Guard
"Every Thang Is Gonna Be Alright"	2008	Young Maylay, Traci Nelson	The Real Coast Guard
"Get Used to It"	2008	Ice Cube, Game	Raw Footage
"We Don't Give a Fuck"	2008	Ralph Myerz, J. Wells, Nam	Ralphorama! Appetite For Selfdestruction
"Mind of a Madman"	2009	Tha Realest, Yukmouth	Wirness tha Realness
"Frontline"	2010	—N/a	Crazy Tonne's Mix Blog
"Life In California"	2010	Ice Cube, Jayo Felony	I Am the West
"Y'all Know How I Am"	2010	Ice Cube, OMG, Doughboy, Young Maylay	I Am the West
"Too West Coast"	2010	Ice Cube, Young Maylay	I Am the West
"Live & Die"	2011	Tha K.I.D., Payde	N/A
"Don't U Eva 4 Get"	2011	Daz Dillinger, Soopafly	D.A.Z.
"International Papers"	2011	Young Maylay	Rhythm & Passion
"Jetlag"	2012	L.O.C., U$O	Prestige, Paranoia, Persona, Vol. 1
"I Grew Up"	2012	Peter Jackson	No Talking
"To właśnie jest rap"	2012	Familia HP	Misja
"187"	2012	C-Bo	Orca
"Still Westsidin'"	2012	Vicky Chand	More Than a Mixtape
"Can't Hold Me"	2013	Big Dave, Necro	Self Made
"Ask About Me"	2013	Celly Cel, C-Bo	Morphine
"West to the Dam"	2013	Brainpower	The Collabs
"I See Ya"	2014	Black Knights	Every Night Is Still a Black Knight
"Hate Around Da Corner "	2014	C-Siccness	West Coast Lunaticz
"Can't Hold Us"	2015	Spice 1, Bossolo	Haterz Nightmare
"Search Warrant"	2015	Paris, E-40, Kam, Tha Eastsidaz	Pistol Politics
"The Roof Is On Fire"	2016	Trick-Trick, Xzibit	Outlaw
"Gotta Get Mine"	2016	Koache	Game Point
"Bang Bang"	2016	Diirty OGz, Gangsta	We Got Now and Next
"Represent Like This"	2017	MC Eiht	Which Way Iz West
"Bonafide"	2021	Bossolo	Thug Therapy II
"Legendary Gee Shid"	2022	Bossolo	Boss Status
"Bounce"	2022	Dezzy Hollow	In The Funk

== See also ==
- Low Profile discography
- WC and the Maad Circle discography
- Westside Connection discography
