= Featuring... Ice Cube =

Compilation album by Ice Cube
- Released: December 16, 1997
- Genre: Gangsta rap
- Length: 50:38
- Label: Priority
- Producer: Scott Young

Ice Cube chronology
Bootlegs & B-Sides (1994)	Featuring... Ice Cube (1997)	Greatest Hits (2001)

Professional ratings
Review scores
Source	Rating
AllMusic	2.5/5 stars

Featuring... Ice Cube is the second compilation album by American rapper and record producer Ice Cube. It was released on December 16, 1997 via Priority Records. The compilation consists of twelve selected collaborative songs that had been previously released, with the exception of the opening track, "Bend a Corner wit Me", which is exclusive to this album. Cube's collaborators include Dr. Dre, Scarface, WC and the Maad Circle, Westside Connection, Chuck D, Das EFX, George Clinton, Ice-T, Kool G Rap, Mr. Mike, Mr. Short Khop and Yo-Yo.

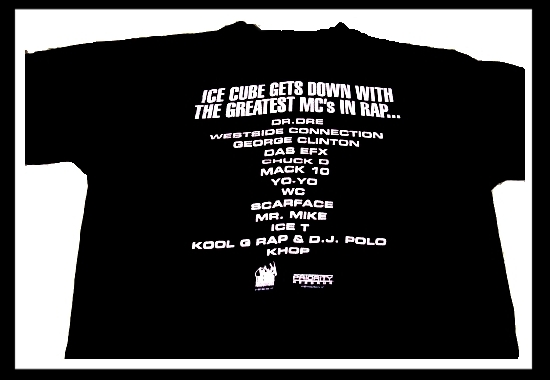
Promotional T-shirt for the Featuring... Ice Cube compilation album

In the United States, the album peaked at number 116 on the Billboard 200 and number 32 on the Top R&B/Hip-Hop Albums charts.

== Track listing ==
No.	Title	Writer(s)	Album / year	Length
1.	"Bend a Corner wit Me" (featuring Mr. Short Khop)	O'Shea Jackson; T. Anderson	℗ 1997	4:00
2.	"Natural Born Killaz" (featuring Dr. Dre)	Jackson; Andre Young	from Murder Was the Case ℗ 1994	4:49
3.	"Bow Down" (performed by Westside Connection)	Jackson; Dedrick Rolison; William Calhoun; Stephen Anderson	from Bow Down ℗ 1996	3:31
4.	"Bop Gun (One Nation)" (featuring George Clinton)	Jackson; George Clinton, Jr.; Quincy Jones III; Garry Shider; Walter Morrison; William Collins	from Lethal Injection ℗ 1993	4:50
5.	"Check Yo Self" (featuring Das EFX)	Jackson; Lawrence Muggerud; Edward Fletcher; Melvin Glover; Sylvia Robinson	from The Predator ℗ 1993	3:56
6.	"Endangered Species (Tales from the Darkside)" (featuring Chuck D)	Jackson; Eric Sadler	from AmeriKKKa's Most Wanted ℗ 1990	3:24
7.	"Trespass" (featuring Ice-T)	Jackson; Tracy Marrow	from Trespass ℗ 1992	2:56
8.	"It's a Man's World" (featuring Yo-Yo)	Jackson; Yolanda Whitaker; Anthony Wheaton	from AmeriKKKa's Most Wanted ℗ 1990	5:29
9.	"West Up!" (featuring WC and the Maad Circle)	Jackson; W. Calhoun; Lamar Calhoun; Rolison; George Duke; Byron Miller; Leon Chancler; Charles Foster Johnson	from Curb Servin' ℗ 1995	4:47
10.	"Game Over" (featuring Scarface and Dr. Dre)	Jackson; Brad Jordan; Young; Richard Vick	from The Untouchable ℗ 1997	4:03
11.	"Wicked Wayz" (featuring Mr. Mike)	Jackson; Mike Walls; Tristan Jones	from Wicked Wayz ℗ 1996	4:07
12.	"Two to the Head" (featuring Kool G Rap & D.J. Polo)	Jackson; Nathaniel Wilson; Jordan; Richard Shaw; Wheaton; Eddie Hazel; Clinton, Jr.	from Live and Let Die ℗ 1992	4:46
Total length:				50:38

Sample credits

- Track 4 contains an interpolation of "One Nation Under a Groove" written by George Clinton, Jr., Garry Shider, Walter Morrison and William Collins.
- Track 5 contains a sample from "The Message" written by Edward Fletcher, Melvin Glover and Sylvia Robinson as performed by Grandmaster Flash.
- Track 8 contains an interpolation of "It's a Man's Man's Man's World" written by James Brown and Betty Jean Newsome.
- Track 9 contains a sample from "Reach for It" written and performed by George Duke.
- Track 12 contains a sample from "Mommy, What a Funkadelic" written by George Clinton, Jr. and Eddie Hazel.

== Personnel ==
- O'Shea "Ice Cube" Jackson – executive producer
- Scott Young – compilation producer
- Monica Jean – project coordinator
- Maggie Magarian – art direction, design
- Darren Bradley – A&R director
- Greg Danylyshyn – A&R coordinator
- Joel Bechtolt – additional A&R

== Charts ==
Chart (1998)	Peak position
US Billboard 200	116
US Top R&B/Hip-Hop Albums (Billboard)	32
