= Gangstas Make the World Go Round =

Single by Westside Connection

from the album Bow Down
- Released: February 15, 1997
- Recorded: 1996
- Genre: West Coast hip hop; gangsta rap; g-funk
- Length: 4:33
- Label: Priority
- Songwriters: O'Shea Jackson; Dedrick Rolison; William Calhoun, Jr.
- Producers: Ice Cube; Cedric Samson (co.)

Westside Connection singles chronology
"Bow Down" (1996)	"Gangstas Make the World Go Round" (1997)	"Gangsta Nation" (2003)

Music video
- "Gangstas Make the World Go Round" on YouTube

"Gangstas Make the World Go Round" is the second single by Westside Connection from the debut studio album, Bow Down, which was released on February 15, 1997.

== Track listing ==
- CD Single
1. Gangstas Make the World Go Round (Album Version) — 4:36
2. Gangstas Make the World Go Round (Clean) — 4:37
3. Gangstas Make the World Go Round (Instrumental) — 4:38
4. Bow Down (Ice Cube's Gangsta Mix) — 4:32

== Charts ==
Chart (1997)	Peak position
US Billboard Hot 100	40
US Hot R&B/Hip-Hop Songs (Billboard)	30
US Hot Rap Songs (Billboard)	10
