= Bow Down (disambiguation) =

Bow Down is the debut studio album by Westside Connection.

Bow Down may also refer to:

- Bow Down, a 1977 chamber opera by Harrison Birtwistle
- "Bow Down" (Westside Connection song), 1996
- "Bow Down/I Been On", a Beyoncé song later reworked to become "Flawless" (2013)
- "Bow Down", a song by Chvrches from the 2015 album Every Open Eye
- "Bow Down", a song by KSI and Randolph from the 2019 album New Age
- "Bow Down" (I Prevail song), 2019
- "Bow Down", a song by Australian musician Barkaa, from her 2021 album Blak Matriarchy
- "Bow Down", a song by Geese from the 2025 album Getting Killed

== See also ==
- Bowing, a gesture of respect, greeting, gratitude, or apology in many cultures.
- Down bow, a type of stroke used when bowing a musical instrument
