= Hallway Productionz =

American music production duo

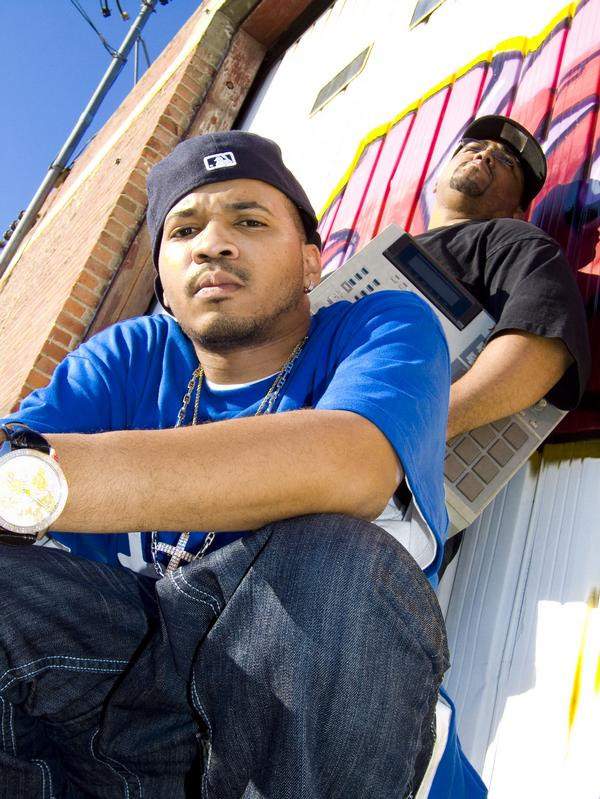
- Dee Underdue (left) and Teak Underdue (right)

Background information
- Origin: Stockton, California, U.S.
- Genres: Hip hop
- Occupation: Record producers
- Years active: 2002–present
- Labels: Hallway; Lench Mob
- Members: Teak Underdue; Dee Underdue

Hallway Productionz is a music production duo from Stockton, California, composed of Teak & Dee Underdue. They have been credited on albums for music industry artists mainly in hip hop and contemporary R&B, such as Ice Cube, WC, T-Bone, Angie Stone, Dave Hollister, and Mindless Behavior.

== Production discography ==
=== 2002 ===
- Blackalicious – Blazing Arrow (2002)

- Purest Love (piano, bass guitar, guitar, trumpet)

=== 2003 ===
- Dead Prez- Turn off the Radio: The Mixtape Vol. 2: Get Free or Die Tryin' (2003)

Coming of Age

- Lyrics Born-Later That Day (2003)

One Session (co-writer, keyboards)
Stop Complaining (trumpet, keyboards)

- MSN March Madness Basketball commercial (2003)

bass guitar, keyboards, trumpet, flugelhorn

- Lifesavas-Spirit in Stone (2003)

Soldierfied (Guitar)
Emerged (Bass guitar, Guitar)

=== 2004 ===
- Keak Da Sneak & Dopegame Presents Dope Game (2004)

Bring It Ta Ya pt. 1
G's Up featuring Allen Anthony
Gangsta Team featuring The Team
Bring It Ta Ya pt. 2

- Maroons-Ambush (2004)

Ambush
Matter of Time
If
Best of Me
Best of Me (Bonus Beat)
365
First Draw
(bass guitar, guitar, keyboards, trumpet)

- Diz – It's My Turn (2004)

It's My Turn featuring E-40

- Terrell Carter-Terrell" (2004)

Thinking About You

=== 2005 ===
- Ice Cube-xXx: State of the Union Soundtrack & Movie (2005)

Anybody Seen the Popo's?!

- T-Bone-Bone-A-Fide (2005)

Let That Thang Go
I Been Looking Around

- Blackalicious-The Craft (2005)

Supreme People
Powers
Your Move
Lotus Flower featuring George Clinton
Side to Side
Ego Sonic War Drums
-co-writer on these tracks. bass guitar & synths on the entire album

- Lyrics Born-Same !@#$ Different Day (2005)

Pack Up Remix featuring Evidence, Dilated Peoples, KRS-One
I'm Just Raw
Shake It Off (Bad Dreams Part II)
I Can't Wait For Your Love (Limited Time Offer)
bass guitar & Keyboards on these songs

- Rah Muzic Presents – Dope Game 2 (2005)

Dope Game Mobsters
In The Dope Game

- "BA-BA Sports" (2005)

Put Ya Ring Back on featuring Yukmouth, Allen Anthony, Keak Da Sneak

- Sophia Maria-Oh My My (2005)

Oh My My

=== 2006 ===
- Ice Cube – Laugh Now, Cry Later' (2006)

Child Support
The Game Lord
D**k Tease featuring Fat Man Scoop
Look Where You At (Unreleased)

- Lyrics Born – Overnite Encore: Lyrics Born Live (2006)

Knock Knock

- Yukmouth & Killa Klump-Killa Thugs (2006)

Aint No
Yada Yada Boyz
Get it Popin
Talkn Bout featuring Keak da Sneak
Cakin Up
New Circumstances
Talk Bout Me
Boss
Gunz Up
Aint No Love
Neck Straight

- "Waist Deep (soundtrack) & Waist Deep movie (2006)

Child Support by Ice Cube

- "Bear-The Bear Necessities" (2006)

Produced entire album except "Beautiful"

=== 2007 ===
- WC – Guilty by Affiliation (2007)

West Coast Voodoo featuring The Game & Ice Cube
Guilty By Affiliation
Crazy Toones 4 President
If You See A Bad Bitch
80's Babies featuring Ice Cube
Addicted To It

- "Mister Sniper-Freedom Writers" movie (2007)

Change featuring T-Bone

- "T-Bone-Bone-Appetit!"

Name Droppin featuring Eric Dawkin

- "Ice Cube-In The Movies" (2007)

Anybody Seen The Popos?!

=== 2008 ===
- Ice Cube – Raw Footage (2008)

Hood Mentality featuring Angie Stone
Why Me? featuring Musiq Soulchild
Cold Places
Thank God

- Ice Cube-The Essentials (2008)

Cold Places

- Young Maylay – The Real Coast Guard (2008)

Necklace Jumpin (West Or Nothin)
Rock The Beat
You Ain't Uh
Every Thang Is Gonna Be Alright featuring WC & Traci Nelson

- "Ren Da Heat Monsta of Doja Clik-"Da Mudville King" (Doja Clik Presents)" (2008)

Talkn About Me featuring Turf Talk & E-40
West Up feat. WC & Dj Crazy Toones
Reflections
Put It on Me featuring Too Short
Officer Down

- "The Tones-Dreamtalk (2008)

Searching

=== 2009 ===
- "Ledisi-Turn Me Loose" (2009)

Runnin' (bass guitar, guitar, synthesizers)
Grammy Nominated Album

- "Poison Pen-The Money Shot" (2009)

2nd Amendment featuring Immortal Technique
Finished

=== 2010 ===
- Y'Anna Crawley (2010)

"I Believe" & "Lookin' Towards Heaven"

- Lyrics Born-As U Were (2010)

"We Live by the Beat"

co-producers

- E-40 – Revenue Retrievin': Night Shift (2010)

Stilettos & Jeans featuring "Bobby V"

- Ice Cube – I Am The West (2010)

"Too West Coast" &
"All Day Everyday"

=== 2011 ===
- WC-Revenge of the Barracuda (2011)

"Revenge of the Barracuda (intro)"
"That's What I'm Talkin' Bout"
"You Know Me" featuring Ice Cube & Young Maylay
"Reality Show"

- Young Maylay (2011)

"Mic It" (producers)

- Ledisi-Pieces of Me

"One Step Ahead" (iTunes Bonus track)
Bass Guitar, Keyboards

- Mindless Behavior Interscope (2011)

"Can I Be Yours" (unreleased)
"My Girl Remix" featuring Ciara, Lil Twist, Tyga & Akon
"Christmas with My Girl"
"Ms. Right Club/Dance Remix" featuring Chipmunk

- Professor Break Speed

"Toy Jack Pot"
multi instrumentalist

- Soopafly- Best Kept Secret

"Best Kept Secret" featuring Goldie Loc, Maylay & Kokane
- Bass guitar & additional instrumentation

=== 2012 ===
- Nick Hagelin "Ex Games"

all music & programming.
with Walter Millsap III

- Turf Talk (2012)

multiple tracks
"Do Me Right" feat. R.O.D.

- Young Maylay (2012)

multiple tracks

- The Chicken Hill Project (2012)

Produced and Mixed

- Mindless Behavior

"Hello" video dance break

- Mr & Mrs. Fresh

producers
"My Baby"
"Fit You in My Plans"
"Fresh Everything"
"Haterism" featuring Issa Thompson (unreleased)

- Miguel

"Every Minute You're Gone (torture)- demo
written by Diane Warren
-producer

- Jacob Latimore

"Repeat" (demo)
written by Diane Warren
-producer

- Brandy- Put It Down featuring Chris Brown (Dance Remix)

(unreleased)
-producer

=== 2013 ===
- Mindless Behavior- All Around the World

producers with Walter Millsap III, programing
"All Around The World"
"AllAround The World (Remix)"
"Lose it (Lean)" featuring Soulja Boy
"Pretty Girl" featuring Lil Twist & Jacob Latimore
"Girl Like You" (additional drum programing)

- Ledisi – Loud Speaker – Something About Us (TBA)

producers, multi instrumentalist

=== 2014 ===
- Fifth Harmony

Tour set music & Programming.

- Keri Hilson

"XOXO" (unreleased)

- Ice Cube – Everythang's Corrupt

"Take What We Want"
"Non Believers"
"Respect Your Elders"
"Ye Without Sin (unreleased)"

- DJ SN1 -

"Rachet Love"

- Gerald Haddon -

"Awesome God" (additional programming)

- Danetra Moore

"All I Can Do Is Pray"(composer/producer. Co-produced by Puretonez Productions)

- Turf Talk

"P---- Wasn't That Bomb" (unreleased)

- Allday (featured in the film All Cheerleaders Die )

"Everday"
"Nom Nom Nom"
"Medication"

- Tinashe-Jimmy Kimmel Live Performance

"2 On" Live performance set (bass, keyboards, drum programming, engineering)
"Pretend" Live performance set (bass, keyboards, drum programming, engineering)

- Brandy Norwood- BET HipHop Awards 2014 Live performance set (bass, additional keyboards, drum programming)

"I Wanna Be Down Remix" featuring Queen Latifah, MC Lyte, Yo-Yo

- Tinashe-Live set Producer

Soultrain Awards Performance
Songs- Pretend, Pretend (Dance Version), 2 On- All Live Instruments by Hallway Productionz

=== 2015 ===
- Tinashe- LIVE set Producer

"All Hands On Deck"- (All Instruments (Bass, guitar, keys, synths, Drum programming) except Live drums)

The Conan O' Brien Show
Good Morning America
Powerhouse LA
Nicki Minaj's Pinkprint Tour

- Tinashe

"Aquarius"-Live Tour/Show Intro

All Instruments (Bass, guitar, keys, synths, Drum programming) except Live drums

- Blackalicious-Imani Vol. 1

"Blacka"-Bass

"On Fire Tonight"-(Bass, Guitar, Keys)

"The Sun"-(Bass & Synths)

"Inspired By" featuring Bosko - Producer with Chief Xcel, Bass, synths, guitar

"We Did It Again"- (Bass, Keys, Synths)

"I Like The Way You Talk"- (Bass, Guitar, Keys, Synths)

"Twist Of Time"- (Co-writer, Bass, Piano, Synths)

"The Blow Up"- (Bass, Guitar, Keys, Synths)

"Love's Gonna Save The Day"- (Bass, Piano, Keys, Synths)

"Alpha And Omega"- (Synths)

"The Hour Glass"- (Bass, Guitar, Keys, Synths)

- E-40-Poverty and Prosperity

"The End" featuring Krizz Kaliko & Jubu Smith

producer. All instruments by Hallway.
solo guitar by Jubu Smith

- Angie Stone-Dream

"Clothes Don't Make A Man"

co-producer with Walter Millsap III
All Instruments by Hallway

"Dream"

co-producer with Walter Millsap III
All Instruments by Hallway

"2 Bad Habits"

co-producer with Walter Millsap III
All Instruments by Hallway

"Quits"

co-producer with Walter Millsap III
All Instruments by Hallway

"Forget About Me"

co-producer with Walter Millsap III
All Instruments by Hallway

"Didn't Break Me"

co-producer with Walter Millsap III
All Instruments by Hallway

All instruments: (bass, guitar, piano, organ, strings, synths, horn programming/Arrangement, percussion, drums, drum programming)

Kenex-Single
"No Bammer" featuring Nef The Pharaoh

=== 2016 ===
- Mindless Behavior- #OfficialMBMusic

"I Want Dat"

co-producer with Walter Millsap III
All music by Hallway

"Freaks Only"

co-producer with Walter Millsap III
All music by Hallway

"Blur"

co-producer with Walter Millsap III
All music by Hallway

"Come Up"

co-producer with Walter Millsap III
All music by Hallway

"Muzik"

co-producer with Walter Millsap III
All music by Hallway

"11s"

co-producer with Walter Millsap III
All music by Hallway

"My Bad"

co-producer with Walter Millsap III
All music by Hallway

- David Hollister

The Manuscript

"Receipts"

"Oh Ya Ya"

"One Great Love"

"Barbershop"

"Geometry"

All music & instruments played & produced by Teak Underdue

- Brandy Norwood

Slayana World Tour
Tour Music Producer:
"Bestfriend" (Trap version) (Brandy Album)
"Shoop" (Whitney Houston Tribute)
"Broken Hearted" (Brandy Album)
"I Thought" (Afrodisiac Album)
"Necessary" (Afrodisiac Album)

Destiny Rogers

Never Thought

=== 2017 ===
Jaheim-W.A.R. album 9 songs produced with Walter Millsap III

Huntar-Pony Remix feat Gucci Mane

Chicken Hill Project Two whole album produced, recorded, mixed by Teak & Dee

=== 2018 ===
- Ice Cube-Everythangs Corrupt

Super OG
Can You Dig It?
Non Believers

Billboard Bear-The Essentials

Tight Rope
What You Like feat Bueno
My Kind of Girl feat Rrari
GoodLife
Superstar feat Moonshyne Brown
First Luv
Seasons
Girlfriend feat Kenex
Heartbreak
Destiny
My Rose

Album Produced, Mix, Mastered, Recorded & All Instruments By Teak & Dee

Kenex-Iconic

Iconic
Genesis 1:3
Every Week feat Slimmy B SOB X RBE & Yelly

Co-produced by Teak

No Bammer feat Nef The Pharaoh & Samyell
Never Forget feat Complex
My Heart Pt2
Money On The Table feat Jayrah Gibson & Layzie Bone
We In The Money
Patience

Album Co-Executive Produced, Produced, Arranged, Mix, Mastered by Teak & Dee

=== 2019 ===
Dee Hallway Productionz-The Definition Entire Album Mix, Mastered, Produced by Teak & Dee

- Angie Stone-Full Circle

"Gonna Have To Be You"

co-producer with Walter Millsap III
All Instruments by Hallway except electric guitar & brass horns

- Angie Stone-Full Circle

"Dinosaur"

co-producer with Walter Millsap III
All Instruments by Hallway

=== 2020 ===
- Toni Braxton

"Do It Remix"

- DoorDash- Blackalicious Commercial

=== 2021 ===
- Ice Cube-"Trying To Maintain"

Trying To Maintain

producer

- Redman-TBA
- Candice Nelson-TBA
- Lyrics Born-Album co-producer
- Young Maylay
- Latoya London

Silly

=== 2023 ===
- E-40-Rule Of Thumb

"The Bay"

- Angie Stone-Love Language

"The Gym" Featuring Music Soulchild
"Good man"

- Ruben Studdard-The Way I Remember It

"Masterpiece"
"Gretzky"

- George Clinton

"Atomic Dog Que Dog Edition"

=== 2024 ===
- Lyrics Born- Goodbye Sticky Rice

-All 8 Songs Produced, Arranged & all Instruments by Teak Underdue Except: “It Might Not Be Love & Beautiful Dj.”

- Redman (rapper)-Muddy Waters Too

”Im On Dat Bullshit”
”Intro” (unreleased)

- Ice Cube-Man Down

”Scary Movie”

- Vanessa Bell Armstrong-Today

”Today” (producer with Walter Millsap III)

All Instruments by Teak Underdue

=== 2025 ===
- Ice Cube-Man Up

”Before Hip Hop” (single)

”Before Hip Hop PreMix”

Featuring LL Cool J & Chuck D

- NBA All Star Weekend-

”Welcome To The Bay” Commercial

- Okwerdz

“Out The Way”(single)

- RBL Posse Presents Joe Fresco-MAPA’s In The House

(Album producer)

- Okwerdz

“Shut Up”(single)

- RBL Posse Presents-MAPA Crew

”Str8 Lacin No Chasin-Side A
(Album Producer)

- RBL Posse Presents-MAPA Crew

”Str8 Lacin No Chasin-Side B
(Album Producer)

=== 2026 ===
- Black C RBL Posse

”Romeo & Juliet” (single)

- Turf Talk & Work Dirty-

”Evils Of Money”(single)

- E-40 Sick Wid It Compilation
- Natalie Nunn-Album TBA
- Brandon Leake-Intimacy

”I’ve Got”
”Shine”
”Don’t Count Me Out”
”In Real Life”
-producer, bass, piano, guitar, keyboards, drum programming

== Other media appearances ==
=== Video games ===
year	Video game	Song
2007	Tony Hawk's Proving Ground	"Blackalicious-Your Move"
2008	Midnight Club: Los Angeles	WC-West Coast Voodoo featuring The Game & Ice Cube

=== Television ===
year	TV Show	Song
2007	Gossip Girl Pilot	Lyrics Born-Knock Knock
2008	The Real World: Brooklyn Episode 1	"J McCoy-What U Trippn For"
varies	Vh1, MTV	2 songs
2008	McDonald's Corporation Commercial	musician
2010	Target Corporation Christmas Commercial	Professor Break Speed – "Toy Jack Pot"
2010	AT&T U-verse Commercial	musician

== Filmography ==
Year	Movie	Song
2005	xXx: State of the Union	Ice Cube-Anybody Seen The Popo's?!
2006	Waist Deep	Ice Cube-Child Support
2007	Freedom Writers	Mister Sniper-Change featuring T-Bone
2013	All Around The World	Mindless Behavior-All Around The World
2014	All Cheerleaders Die	AllDay-Everyday, Nom Nom Nom & Medication
2017	xXx: Return of Xander Cage	Ice Cube-Thank God

== Awards and nominations ==
Year	Award	Album
2007	Grammy Nomination for Best Rap/Rock Gospel Album of the year	Bone-A-Fide
2008	Dove Award Winner for Rap/Hip Hop Song of The Year	Bone-Appetit!
2009	Grammy Nomination for Best R&B Album	Ledisi-Turn Me Loose
2012	Grammy Nomination for Best R&B Album	Ledisi-Pieces of Me
