= Go to Church =

Single by Ice Cube featuring Snoop Dogg and Lil Jon

from the album Laugh Now, Cry Later
- Released: June 1, 2006
- Recorded: 2006
- Genre: Crunk
- Length: 4:00
- Label: Lench Mob; Virgin; EMI
- Songwriters: O'Shea Jackson; Calvin Broadus; Jonathan Smith
- Producer: Lil Jon

Ice Cube singles chronology
"Why We Thugs" (2006)	"Go to Church" (2006)	"Steal the Show" (2006)

Snoop Dogg singles chronology
"Cali Iz Active" (2006)	"Go to Church" (2006)	"Gangsta Walk" (2006)

Lil Jon singles chronology
"Act a Fool" (2006)	"Go to Church" (2006)	"That's Right" (2007)

"Go to Church" is the second official single from Ice Cube's album Laugh Now, Cry Later. The song features Snoop Dogg and Lil Jon. The song is also produced by Lil Jon and a music video was released for the song. In the edited version, instead of "mothafucka," Ice Cube says "mothamotha".

== Music video ==
The music video features Lil Jon playing an electronic organ and Ice Cube and Snoop Dogg riding on lowrider bikes. It was directed by Marcus Raboy. Some of the lyrics in the chorus, for example, "mothafucka," were blanked completely. Don "Magic" Juan, The Clipse, Bubba Sparxxx, WC, Ying Yang Twins, DJ Crazy Toones, Billie Joe Armstrong and Katt Williams made cameo appearances. The music video first premiered on Making the Video one week after the release of the CD.

== Chart positions ==
Chart	Position
Israel Top 20 Hip Hop Chart	16
US Bubbling Under Hot 100 (Billboard)	21
US Hot R&B/Hip-Hop Songs (Billboard)	67
US Hot Rap Songs (Billboard)	25
