= Terrorist Threats =

Studio album by Westside Connection
- Released: December 9, 2003
- Recorded: 2002–2003
- Genres: West Coast hip hop; gangsta rap
- Length: 51:24
- Labels: Hoo-Bangin'; Capitol
- Producers: Big Tank; Damizza; DJ Jamal; Fredwreck; Megahertz; Midi Mafia; Pockets; Rashad Coes; Ron "Neff-U" Feemster; Sir Jinx; Young Tre

Westside Connection chronology
Bow Down (1996)	Terrorist Threats (2003)

Mack 10 chronology
Ghetto, Gutter & Gangsta (2003)	Terrorist Threats (2003)	Hustla's Handbook (2005)

Ice Cube chronology
War & Peace Vol. 2 (The Peace Disc) (2000)	Terrorist Threats (2003)	Laugh Now, Cry Later (2006)

WC chronology
Ghetto Heisman (2002)	Terrorist Threats (2003)	Guilty by Affiliation (2007)

Singles from Terrorist Threats
- 1. "Gangsta Nation" Released: October 14, 2003

Professional ratings
Review scores
Source	Rating
AllMusic	3/5 stars
laut.de	3/5 stars
Now	3/5
Pitchfork	5.9/10
RapReviews	8/10
Robert Christgau	(1-star Honorable Mention)
The Guardian	2/5 stars
USA Today	3/4 stars
Vibe	3/5 marks

Terrorist Threats is the second and final studio album by American West Coast hip hop supergroup Westside Connection. It was released on December 9, 2003, through Hoo-Bangin' Records and Capitol Records. Production was handled by Young Tre, Bruce Waynne, Dirty Swift, Pockets, Rashad Coes, Big Tank, Damizza, DJ Jamal, Fredwreck, Megahertz, Neff-U, and Sir Jinx, with Ice Cube and Mack 10 serving as executive producers. It features guest appearances from K-Mac, Butch Cassidy, Young Soprano (p.k.a. Deviossi), Knoc-turn'al, Nate Dogg, Skoop Delania, and Keith David, who voiced the intro track "Threat to the World", and parts of "Potential Victims" and "Gangsta Nation". The album debuted at number 16 on the Billboard 200 with first-week sales of 136,000 copies sold in the US. It has since sold 679,000 records in the US and has been certified Gold by the RIAA on January 12, 2004.

== Track listing ==
No.	Title	Writer(s)	Producer(s)	Length
1.	"A Threat to the World" (Intro)			1:14
2.	"Call 9-1-1"	O'Shea Jackson; Dedrick Rolison; William Calhoun; Treyvon Green	Young Tre	3:44
3.	"Potential Victims"	Jackson; Rolison; Calhoun; Green	Young Tre	3:02
4.	"Gangsta Nation" (featuring Nate Dogg)	Jackson; Rolison; Calhoun; Nathaniel Hale; Farid Nassar	Fredwreck	4:53
5.	"Get Ignit"	Jackson; Rolison; Calhoun; Theron Feemster	Ron "Neff-U" Feemster	4:11
6.	"Pimp the System" (featuring Butch Cassidy)	Jackson; Rolison; Calhoun; Danny Means; Claudio Robles; Rashad Coes	Pockets; Rashad Coes	4:45
7.	"Don't Get Outta Pocket" (featuring K-Mac)	Jackson; Rolison; Calhoun; Kelly Garmon; Green	Young Tre	3:51
8.	"Izm"	Jackson; Rolison; Calhoun; Waynne Nugent; Kevin Risto	Bruce Waynne; Dirty Swift	4:05
9.	"So Many Rappers In Love"	Jackson; Rolison; Calhoun; Robles; Coes	Pockets; Rashad Coes	4:13
10.	"Lights Out" (featuring Knoc-turn'al)	Jackson; Rolison; Calhoun; Royal Harbor; Damion Young; Howard Hersh	Damizza	3:43
11.	"Bangin' at the Party" (featuring K-Mac, Skoop Delania and Young Soprano)	Jackson; Rolison; Calhoun; Garmon; Jimmy Tucker; Andrew Price II; Anthony Wheaton; J. Hill	Sir Jinx; DJ Jamal #9	3:12
12.	"You Gotta Have Heart"	Jackson; Rolison; Calhoun; Nugent; Risto	Bruce Waynne; Dirty Swift	3:52
13.	"Terrorist Threats"	Jackson; Rolison; Calhoun; Derryck Thornton	Big Tank	2:28
14.	"Superstar (Double Murder = Double Platinum)"	Jackson; Rolison; Calhoun; Dorsey Wesley	Megahertz	4:14
Total length:				51:24

Notes

- Tracks 1, 3 and 4 featured vocals by Keith David
- Tracks 8 and 12 featured additional vocals by Bruce Waynne
- Track 11 featured additional vocals by Mr. Holloway and Spider Loc

Sample credits

- Track 5 contains a sample from the video "Bum Fights"
- Track 6 contains a sample from the movie American Pimp
- Track 8 contains elements from the song "Gangster of Love" written by David Byrne, Chris Frantz, Jerry Harrison and Tina Weymouth and performed by Talking Heads

== Personnel ==
- Dedrick "Mack 10" Rolison – main performer, executive producer, A&R
- O'Shea "Ice Cube" Jackson – main performer, executive producer
- William "WC" Calhoun Jr. – main performer
- Nathaniel "Nate Dogg" Hale – featured artist (track 4)
- Danny "Butch Cassidy" Means – featured artist (track 6)
- Kelly "K-Mac" Garmon – featured artist (tracks: 7, 11)
- Royal "Knoc-turn'al" Harbor – featured artist (track 10)
- Jimmy "Skoop Delania" Tucker – featured artist (track 11)
- Andrew "Deviossi"/"Young Soprano" Price II – featured artist (track 11)
- Keith David – additional vocals (tracks: 1, 3, 4)
- Waynne "Bruce Waynne" Nugent – additional vocals & producer (tracks: 8, 12)
- Mr. Holloway – additional vocals (track 11)
- Curtis "Spider Loc" Williams – additional vocals (track 11)
- Treyvon "Young Tre" Green – producer (tracks: 2, 3, 7)
- Farid "Fredwreck" Nassar – producer (track 4)
- Theron "Neff-U" Feemster – producer (track 5)
- Claudio "Pockets" Robles – producer (tracks: 6, 9)
- Rashad Coes – producer (tracks: 6, 9)
- Kevin "Dirty Swift" Risto – producer (tracks: 8, 12)
- Damion "Damizza" Young – producer (track 10)
- Anthony "Sir Jinx" Wheaton – producer (track 11)
- J. "DJ Jamal" Hill – producer (track 11)
- Derek "Big Tank" Thornton – producer (track 13)
- Dorsey "Megahertz" Wesley – producer (track 14)
- Andrew Shack – co-executive producer, A&R
- Brian "Big Bass" Gardner – mastering
- Naoto Ikeda – photography
- Kevin Faist – A&R
- Candyce Handley – A&R

== Charts ==
=== Weekly charts ===
Chart (2003–2004)	Peak position
Australian Albums (ARIA)	62
Belgian Albums (Ultratop Flanders)	94
Canadian Albums (Nielsen SoundScan)	40
Canadian R&B Albums (Nielsen SoundScan)	7
French Albums (SNEP)	119
US Billboard 200	16
US Top R&B/Hip-Hop Albums (Billboard)	3

=== Year-end charts ===
Chart (2004)	Position
US Billboard 200	94
US Top R&B/Hip-Hop Albums (Billboard)	18

== Certifications ==
Region	Certification	Certified units/sales
Canada (Music Canada)	Gold	50,000^{^}
United States (RIAA)	Gold	679,000
^{^} Shipments figures based on certification alone.
