= The Shadiest One =

Studio album by WC
- Released: April 28, 1998
- Recorded: 1997–1998
- Studio: Backroom Studios (Glendale, CA); Echo Sound (Los Angeles, CA); Skip Saylor Recording (California); Bad Ass Beat Lab (Antioch, CA); Infinite Studios (Alameda, CA); The Crackhouse; Urban House Studios, Inc.; Can-Am Recorders (Tarzana, CA)
- Genre: West Coast hip hop; gangsta rap; g-funk
- Length: 59:19
- Label: Payday; FFRR
- Producer: DJ Crazy Toones (also exec.); WC (also exec.); Ant Banks; Barr 9 Productions; Daz Dillinger; DJ Battlecat; Douglas Coleman; Mo-Suave-A; Rick "Dutch" Cousin; Stu-B-Doo; Young Tre

WC chronology
The Shadiest One (1998)	Ghetto Heisman (2002)

Singles from The Shadiest One
- 1. "Just Clownin'" Released: November 11, 1997; 2. "Better Days" Released: September 29, 1998

The Shadiest One is the debut solo studio album by American rapper WC. It was released on April 28, 1998, via Payday/FFRR Records. The recording sessions took place at Backroom Studios in Glendale, at Echo Sound in Los Angeles, at Skip Saylor Recording in California, at Bad Ass Beat Lab in Antioch, at Infinite Studios in Alameda, at The Crackhouse, at Urban House Studios, Inc., and at Can-Am Recorders in Tarzana. The production was handled by DJ Battlecat, Stu-B-Doo, Ant Banks, Barr 9 Productions, Daz Dillinger, Douglas Coleman, Mo-Suave-A, Rick "Dutch" Cousin, Young Tre, DJ Crazy Toones and WC (the latter two also served as executive producers). It features guest appearances from CJ Mac, Daz Dillinger, E-40, Ron Banks, Too $hort, and Westside Connection. The album peaked at number 19 on the Billboard 200 and at number 2 on the Top R&B/Hip-Hop Albums in the United States. Both of its singles, "Just Clownin'" and "Better Days", made it to the Billboard Hot 100 landing at number 56 and 64, respectively.

== Critical reception ==
Professional ratings
Review scores
Source	Rating
AllMusic	3/5 stars
The Source	4/5 stars

The Los Angeles Times said that the album "marries slick, funked-out beats with an unpretentious, silver-tongued flow—he sounds like a West Coast version of Queens MC Kool G. Rap."

== Track listing ==
No.	Title	Writer(s)	Producer(s)	Length
1.	"Hog"	William Calhoun; Kevin Gilliam	DJ Battlecat	4:24
2.	"Where Y'All From" (Skit)		DJ Battlecat	1:10
3.	"Fuckin' wit Uh House Party"	W. Calhoun; Gilliam; Lamar Dupre Calhoun; Frank Waddy; George Clinton, Jr.; William Earl Collins	DJ Battlecat; DJ Crazy Toones (co.)	4:49
4.	"The Shadiest One" (featuring CJ Mac)	W. Calhoun; Bryan Ross; Anthony Banks	Ant Banks	4:26
5.	"Can't Hold Back" (featuring Ice Cube)	W. Calhoun; Stuart Craig Bullard; David Porter	Skooby Doo	3:34
6.	"Keep Hustlin'" (featuring E-40 and Too $hort)	W. Calhoun; Earl Stevens; Todd Shaw; Treyvon Green; Norman Anthony Durham; Oliver Augusta Scott; Ronnie James Wilson; Woody Cunningham	Young Tre	3:39
7.	"Just Clownin'"	W. Calhoun; Gilliam; Walter "Junie" Morrison	DJ Battlecat	3:59
8.	"The Autobiography"	W. Calhoun; L. Calhoun; Anthony Henderson	DJ Crazy Toones	1:21
9.	"Worldwide Gunnin'"	W. Calhoun; Bullard	Skooby Doo	3:25
10.	"Like That" (featuring Ice Cube, Daz Dillinger and CJ Mac)	W. Calhoun; O'Shea Jackson; Delmar Arnaud; Ross; Antonio Hardy; Marlon Williams	Daz Dillinger	4:29
11.	"Call It What You Want"	W. Calhoun; L. Calhoun; Grover Washington Jr.; Ross	DJ Crazy Toones	4:29
12.	"Rich Rollin'"	W. Calhoun; Rick Cousins	Rick "Dutch" Cousin	3:40
13.	"Cheddar" (featuring Ice Cube and Mack 10)	W. Calhoun; Tristan Jones; L. Calhoun	Mo-Suave-A	4:12
14.	"Bank Lick" (Interlude)		WC	0:49
15.	"It's All Bad"	W. Calhoun; Gilliam; Bullard; Bernie Worrell; Clinton, Jr.; Collins	DJ Battlecat	4:15
16.	"Better Days" (featuring Ron Banks)	W. Calhoun; Jay Williams; Maurice Thompson; Frankie Beverly	Barr Nine Productions	3:53
17.	"The Outcome"	W. Calhoun; Douglas Coleman	Douglas Coleman	2:45
Total length:				59:19

== Charts ==
Chart (1998)	Peak position
US Billboard 200	19
US Top R&B/Hip-Hop Albums (Billboard)	2
