= Ghetto Heisman =

Studio album by WC
- Released: November 12, 2002
- Recorded: 2002
- Studio: Paramount Recording Studios (Los Angeles, CA); Ameraycan Studios (Los Angeles, CA); Criteria Studios (Miami Beach, FL); Larrabee Sound Studios (Los Angeles, CA)
- Genre: West Coast hip hop; gangsta rap; g-funk
- Length: 56:26
- Label: Def Jam
- Producer: Tina Davis (exec.); Kevin Liles (exec.); WC (exec.); Crazy Toones (also exec.); Tony Pizarro; Flip; DJ Battlecat; Buckwild; Derek Jackson; Neckbones; Rick Rock; Scott Storch

WC chronology
The Shadiest One (1998)	Ghetto Heisman (2002)	Guilty by Affiliation (2007)

Singles from Ghetto Heisman
- 1. "The Streets" Released: July 23, 2002

Professional ratings
Review scores
Source	Rating
AllMusic	2/5 stars
HipHopDX	4/5
RapReviews	7.5/10
The Source	3.5/5 stars

Ghetto Heisman is the second solo studio album by American rapper WC. It was released on November 12, 2002 via Def Jam Recordings. Recording sessions took place at Paramount Recording Studios, at Ameraycan Studios, and at Larrabee Sound Studios in Los Angeles, and at Criteria Studios in Miami Beach. Production was handled by several record producers, including Tony Pizarro, DJ Battlecat, Crazy Toones, Buckwild, Rick Rock and Scott Storch. It features guest appearances from Butch Cassidy, Case, Kokane, MC Ren, Nate Dogg, Scarface, Snoop Dogg and Westside Connection among others.

The album peaked at number 46 on the US Billboard 200 and at number seven on the US Billboard Top R&B/Hip-Hop Albums chart.

Upon the album's release, it was discovered that the first pressings were issued with a noticeable skip on the track "Tears of a Killa".

== Track listing ==
No.	Title	Writer(s)	Producer(s)	Length
1.	"Highlight Reel (Intro)" (performed by Double E)			0:55
2.	"Bellin" (featuring Kokane)	William Calhoun; Jerry Long; Brian Wilson	Brian Wilson	3:55
3.	"The Streets (Re-Twist)" (featuring Snoop Dogg and Nate Dogg)	W. Calhoun; Calvin Broadus; Nathaniel Hale; Scott Storch	Scott Storch	3:47
4.	"Fake Niggas (Skit)" (performed by Bubba Loc)			1:12
5.	"So Hard" (featuring Scarface)	W. Calhoun; Brad Jordan; Anthony Best; Lawrence Parker; Scott Sterling; Domenic Troiano; Shawne Jackson	Buckwild	4:15
6.	"Flirt" (featuring Case)	W. Calhoun; Eric Williams; Ricardo Thomas	Rick Rock	3:45
7.	"187 Um Burgers" (Skit)			0:32
8.	"Walk" (performed by Westside Connection)	W. Calhoun; O'Shea Jackson; Dedrick Rollins; Kevin Gilliam	Battlecat	3:58
9.	"Tears of a Killa" (featuring Butch Cassidy)	W. Calhoun; Danny Means; Gilliam	Battlecat	4:11
10.	"Da Get Together" (featuring Butch Cassidy)	W. Calhoun; Means; Tony Pizarro; Floyd Wilcox	Tony Pizarro; Flip	4:12
11.	"Throw Ya Hood Up" (featuring Toofpick)	W. Calhoun; Chaz Cable; Michael Cable; Pizarro; Wilcox	Tony Pizarro; Flip	3:19
12.	"Wanna Ride" (featuring Ice Cube and MC Ren)	W. Calhoun; Lorenzo Patterson; O. Jackson; Pizarro; Wilcox	Tony Pizarro; Flip	4:19
13.	"Bang Loose" (featuring Dr. Stank, Lady T and Dauville)	W. Calhoun; Pizarro; Wilcox; A. Irvin; T. Williams; D. Milhouse; George Clinton, Jr.; Garry Shider; Bernie Worrell	Tony Pizarro; Flip	4:20
14.	"Get Out"	W. Calhoun; William Warner; Jules Batiste	Da Neckbones	3:18
15.	"Let's Make a Deal" (featuring Gangsta and Lina)	W. Calhoun; Lamar Calhoun; A. Holmes	Crazy Toones	5:17
16.	"Something 2 Live 4"	W. Calhoun; Derek Jackson; Mark Batson	Derek Jackson	5:11
Total length:				56:26

Notes

- Track 2 features additional vocals by Deidre Oliphant
- Track 9 features additional vocals by Maurice Hill and Shawndell Rosa
- Track 13 features additional vocals by Traci Nelson
- Track 14 features additional vocals by Black Chill and DJ Crazy Toones

Sample credits

- Track 1 contains samples from the Brides of Frankenstein recording of "Disco to Go" (written by George Clinton Jr. and William Earl Collins)
- Track 5 contains interpolations from "The Bridge Is Over" (written by Lawrence Parker and Scott La Rock), an interpolation of "Heads High" (written by Smith & Browne), and elements from "Can't Make It Without Me" performed by Shawne Jackson
- Track 13 contains elements from "Atmosphere" performed by Funkadelic

== Charts ==
Chart (2002)	Peak position
US Billboard 200	46
US Top R&B/Hip-Hop Albums (Billboard)	7
