= That's What I'm Talking About (disambiguation) =

That's What I'm Talking About is a 2004 album by Australian singer Shannon Noll.

"That's what I'm talking about" may also refer to:

- "That's What I'm Talking About", a song from the 2002 album Livin' Right by Steve Forde and the Flange
- "That's What I'm Talking About", a 2010 song from rapper WC
- That's What I'm Talking About, a 2010 autobiography by Australian footballer Shane Crawford
- That's What I'm Talking About, a 2013 comedy album by Bob Saget
- Everybody Wants Some!!, a 2016 film with the working title That's What I'm Talking About
