= West Up! =

Single by WC and the Maad Circle

from the album Curb Servin'
- Released: August 15, 1995
- Studio: Echo Sound Studios (Los Angeles, California)
- Genre: West Coast hip-hop
- Label: London
- Songwriters: William Calhoun, Jr.; O'Shea Jackson; Dedrick Rolison; Lamar Calhoun; George Duke; Byron Miller; Leon Chancler; Charles Foster Johnson
- Producer: DJ Crazy Toones

WC and the Maad Circle singles chronology
"Ghetto Serenade" (1992)	"West Up!" (1995)	"The One" (1996)

Music video
- "West Up" on YouTube

Professional ratings
Review scores
Source	Rating
AllMusic	2.5/5 stars

"West Up!" is a song performed by American West Coast hip-hop group WC and the Maad Circle featuring fellow Californian rappers and future Westside Connection members Ice Cube and Mack 10. It was recorded at Echo Sound Studios in Los Angeles and released on August 15, 1995, via PayDay/London Records as the lead single from WC and the Maad Circle's second studio album Curb Servin'. Production was handled by member DJ Crazy Toones, who utilized a sample from George Duke's "Reach for It".

The single peaked at number 88 on the Billboard Hot 100, number 50 on the Hot R&B/Hip-Hop Songs chart, and number 16 on the Hot Rap Songs chart in the United States.

== Track listing ==
12" vinyl
No.	Title	Length
1.	"West Up!" (Radio Version)
2.	"West Up!" (Street Version)
3.	"West Up!" (Instrumental)
4.	"West Up!" (Acapella)

Cassette single
No.	Title	Length
1.	"West Up!" (Street Version)
2.	"West Up!" (Instrumental)

CD single
No.	Title	Length
1.	"West Up!" (Street Version)
2.	"West Up!" (Instrumental)
3.	"Hit the Ground"
4.	"Hit the Ground" (Instrumental)

== Personnel ==
- William "WC" Calhoun Jr. – songwriter, vocals, executive producer
- O'Shea "Ice Cube" Jackson – songwriter, vocals, engineering, executive producer
- Dedrick "Mack 10" Rolison – songwriter, vocals
- Lamar "DJ Crazy Toones" Calhoun – songwriter, producer, executive producer
- Keston Wright – engineering
- Edward O'Dowd – artwork
- Leslie Sokolow – photography
- George Duke – songwriter
- Byron Miller – songwriter
- Leon "Ndugu" Chancler – songwriter
- Charles "Icarus" Johnson – songwriter

== Charts ==
Chart (1995)	Peak position
US Billboard Hot 100	88
US Hot R&B/Hip-Hop Songs (Billboard)	50
US Hot Rap Songs (Billboard)	16
