= Ain't a Damn Thang Changed =

Studio album by WC and the Maad Circle
- Released: September 17, 1991
- Recorded: 1990–1991
- Genres: West Coast hip hop; gangsta rap
- Length: 49:49
- Label: Priority
- Producers: DJ Crazy Toones; Sir Jinx; WC; Chilly Chill

WC and the Maad Circle chronology
Ain't a Damn Thang Changed (1991)	Curb Servin' (1995)

Singles from Ain't a Damn Thang Changed
- 1. "Dress Code" Released: August 4, 1991

Ain't a Damn Thang Changed is the debut studio album by the American rap group WC and the Maad Circle, released in 1991. The songs on the album describe life in Los Angeles as experienced by African Americans in the early 1990s.

Professional ratings
Review scores
Source	Rating
AllMusic	3/5 stars

The album peaked at No. 52 on the Top R&B/Hip-Hop Albums chart.

== Track listing ==
No.	Title	Producer(s)	Length
1.	"Intro"	Crazy Toones; Sir Jinx	1:07
2.	"Ain't a Damn Thang Changed"	Sir Jinx; WC; Chilly Chill (co.); Crazy Toones (co.)	3:32
3.	"The Break Up (Skit)" (featuring Cassanova Jeff)		0:27
4.	"Behind Closed Doors" (featuring Dawn Silva, Jackie Simley & M.L. Davis)	Sir Jinx; WC; Chilly Chill (co.); Crazy Toones (co.)	4:47
5.	"Out on a Furlough" (featuring Cassanova Jeff, Jazzy D & Mike)	Sir Jinx; WC; Crazy Toones (co.)	5:18
6.	"A Crazy Break" (featuring J-Dee)	Crazy Toones	0:56
7.	"Caught n a Fad"	Sir Jinx; WC; Chilly Chill (co.)	3:57
8.	"Fuck My Daddy" (featuring Foe Doe Taylor & Lil' Dee)	Sir Jinx; WC	3:58
9.	"Back on the Scene"	Crazy Toones	1:06
10.	"Get Up on That Funk" (featuring Jazzy D)	Sir Jinx; WC	3:50
11.	"Gettin' Looped / Dress Code"	Sir Jinx; WC; Chilly Chill (co.); Crazy Toones (co.)	4:01
12.	"Smokers La La Bye" (featuring Kaeco)	Crazy Toones; Sir Jinx	1:16
13.	"You Don't Work, U Don't Eat" (featuring J-Dee, MC Eiht & Ice Cube)	Chilly Chill; Crazy Toones; Sir Jinx	4:27
14.	"Grandma Locked Out (Skit)"	Sir Jinx	0:37
15.	"Ghetto Serenade"	Sir Jinx; WC; Crazy Toones (co.)	4:04
16.	"Back to the Underground"	Sir Jinx; WC	3:41
17.	"A Soldiers Story" (featuring Dawn Silva, Jackie Simley & M.L. Davis)	Sir Jinx	2:45
Total length:			49:49

== Personnel ==
- Sir Jinx - producer (tracks 1, 2, 4–5, 7–8, 10–17)
- Big Gee - additional vocals (tracks 5, 8, 10–11)
- Chilly Chill - producer (track 13), co-producer (tracks 2, 4, 7, 11)
- Dino Paredes - artwork
- Crazy Toones - producer (tracks 1, 6, 9, 12–13), co-producer (tracks 2, 4, 5, 11, 15), scratches
- Manuel Donayre - illustration (logo)
- Mike Miller - photography
- Ice Cube - additional vocals (track 13)
- WC - producer (tracks 2, 4–5, 7–8, 10–11, 15–16), rap vocals
- Coolio - rap vocals
