= Bone-A-Fide =

Studio album by T-Bone
- Released: September 27, 2005
- Studio: Digital Guest House; Bombay Digital Studios; The Embassy (Los Angeles); Hartman Way Sounds; Fred's Crib
- Genre: Christian hip hop
- Length: 51:36
- Label: Boneyard; Flicker
- Producer: Baby Dubb; Bosko; Buster & Shavoni; Fred Jerkins III; Fredwreck; Hallway Productionz; King Tech

T-Bone chronology
Gospel Alpha Mega Funky Boogie Disco Music (2002)	Bone-A-Fide (2005)	Bone-Appetit! (2007)

Professional ratings
Review scores
Source	Rating
Cross Rhythms	9/10

Bone-A-Fide is the sixth studio album by Christian hip hop artist T-Bone. It was released on September 27, 2005 via Bone Yard/Flicker Records. Recording sessions took place at Digital Guest House, Bombay Digital Studios, The Embassy in Los Angeles, Hartman Way Sounds and Fred's Crib. Production was handled by Buster & Shavoni, Bosko, Hallway Productionz, Fred Jerkins III, King Tech, Baby Dubb and Fredwreck. It features guest appearances from Chino XL, Lashawn Daniels, Mack 10, Patti LaBelle, Sway & King Tech and Tracy Lane. The album charted at #25 on the Billboard Christian albums chart and #44 on the Billboard Heatseakers chart. At the 49th Annual Grammy Awards, the album was nominated for a Grammy Award for Best Rock or Rap Gospel Album, but lost to Jonny Lang's Turn Around.

== Track listing ==
No.	Title	Writer(s)	Producer(s)	Length
1.	"Tha Rally"	Rene Sotomayor; Louis Earl Brown III	Buster	1:24
2.	"12 Years Ago"	Sotomayor; Bosko Kante	Bosko; Buster (co.); T-Bone (co.)	3:00
3.	"Hard Streets" (featuring Tracy Lane)	Sotomayor; Brown III; Warryn Campbell	Buster; Baby Dubb	4:18
4.	"Let That Thang Go"	Sotomayor; Deejan Underdue; Teak Underdue	Buster; Hallway Productionz	3:49
5.	"Can I Live" (featuring LaShawn Daniels)	Sotomayor; LaShawn Daniels; Fred Jerkins III	Uncle Freddie; Buster (co.); LaShawn Daniels (co.)	4:05
6.	"I Been Looking Around" (featuring Patti LaBelle)	Sotomayor; Brown III; D. Underdue; T. Underdue	Buster; Hallway Productionz	3:50
7.	"Follow T"	Sotomayor; Daniels; Jerkins III	Uncle Freddie; Buster (co.); LaShawn Daniels (co.)	4:05
8.	"Hasta la Victoria Siempre!"	Sotomayor; Brown III	Buster	0:46
9.	"A Few Good Men" (featuring Mack 10)	Sotomayor; Dedrick Rolison; Farid Nassar	Fredwreck	4:06
10.	"Shake Ya Body"	Sotomayor; Brown III; Scott Parker; Kante	Buster & Shavoni; Bosko	4:17
11.	"The Sanction" (featuring Sway & King Tech)	Sotomayor; Jonathan Calloway; Rod Sepand	King Tech	2:05
12.	"You Can't Win" (featuring Chino XL)	Sotomayor; Derek Barbosa; Sepand	King Tech	4:02
13.	"It's OK"	Sotomayor; Kante	Bosko; Buster (co.); T-Bone (co.)	4:04
14.	"Bounce"	Bosko; Brown III; Parker	Buster & Shavoni	3:52
15.	"Victory! Victory! Victory!"	Bosko; Brown III	Buster	3:53
Total length:				51:36
