= The Last Street Preacha =

Studio album by T-Bone
- Released: February 27, 2001
- Recorded: 2000
- Genre: West Coast hip hop; g-funk; Christian hip hop
- Length: 61:33
- Label: Boneyard; Flicker
- Producer: Chase

T-Bone chronology
Tha Hoodlum's Testimony (1997)	The Last Street Preacha (2001)	GospelAlphaMegaFunkyBoogieDiscoMusic (2002)

The Last Street Preacha is the fourth album by Christian hip hop artist T-Bone. It was released on February 27, 2001, via Bone Yard/Flicker Records. Production was handled entirely by Etienne "Chase" Clark. It features guest appearances from Dawkins & Dawkins and E. Doggie Montana. The album peaked at No 33 on the Billboard Heatseekers Albums chart and No 24 on the Top Contemporary Christian Albums chart in the United States. Unlike his previous 90s albums, this album sees T-Bone moving into a more West Coast sound with visible g-funk elements.

At the 44th Annual Grammy Awards, the album was nominated for a Grammy Award for Best Rock Gospel Album, but lost to DC Talk's Solo.

== Critical response ==
Professional ratings
Review scores
Source	Rating
AllMusic	3.5/5 stars

AllMusic's Adam Greenberg wrote: "Aside from a couple of forays into the territory of Bone (the Thugs-N-Harmony version) with four-part harmonies, and another thuggish run, the majority of the tracks feature a style that's primarily a poor man's Snoop Dogg. That's not to say T-Bone is bad in any way, though, just not Snoop himself -- the talent and ability are huge here, and the styles range widely from proper West Coast G-funk to high-speed Spanish rap in the reggaeton mold. It's rare to find an artist hidden away in Christian music with this sort of crossover talent, but T-Bone is likely to remain under-recognized by many listeners".

== Track listing ==
No.	Title	Writer(s)	Length
1.	"Intro"	Rene Sotomayor; Grant Nicholas; Etienne Clark	0:47
2.	"Nuttin' 2 Somethin'"	Sotomayor; Clark	3:43
3.	"Friends"	Sotomayor; Nicholas; Clark	4:10
4.	"Throw Ya Handz Up" (featuring Eric Dawkins)	Sotomayor; Eric Dawkins; Nicholas; Clark	3:31
5.	"Up on Game"	Sotomayor; Clark	4:03
6.	"Ride wit Me"	Sotomayor; Clark	3:54
7.	"Turn This Up"	Sotomayor; Nicholas	3:31
8.	"Wipe Your Tears"	Sotomayor; Nicholas; Clark	4:09
9.	"Conversion"	Sotomayor; Clark	2:53
10.	"Street Life"	Sotomayor; Nicholas; Clark	3:42
11.	"Last Street Preacha"	Sotomayor; Clark	4:01
12.	"My Dream"	Sotomayor; Nicholas; Clark	4:02
13.	"Tru 2 Life Playaz"	Sotomayor; Clark	3:34
14.	"Father Figure" (featuring Dawkins & Dawkins)	Sotomayor; Nicholas; Clark	4:53
15.	"U Don't Know"	Sotomayor; Clark	4:32
16.	"Livin' Lovely" (featuring E. Doggie Montana)	Sotomayor; Clark	4:01
17.	"Mami Linda"	Sotomayor; Nicholas; Clark	2:07
Total length:			61:33

== Personnel ==
- Rene "M.C. T-Bone" Sotomayor – vocals (tracks: 1–16)
- Eric Dawkins – vocals (tracks: 4, 14)
- Talayah A. Nicholas – backing vocals (track 11)
- Anson Dawkins – vocals (track 14)
- E. Doggie Montana – vocals (track 16)
- Grant "Lil Nick" Nicholas – keyboards (tracks: 1, 3, 4, 7, 8, 10, 12, 14)
- Etienne "Chase" Clark – percussion (tracks: 1–13, 15, 16), keyboards (tracks: 2–6, 9–16), drums (tracks: 2–13, 15, 16), producer
- Wali Ali Jr. – talkbox (track 6)
- Arnold Turner – photography
- Monica Fancher – art direction
- Bert Sumner – design
