= Why We Thugs =

Single by Ice Cube

from the album Laugh Now, Cry Later
- B-side: "Dick Tease"
- Released: April 13, 2006
- Recorded: 2005
- Genre: Gangsta rap
- Length: 3:44
- Label: Lench Mob; Virgin; EMI
- Songwriter: O'Shea Jackson
- Producer: Scott Storch

Ice Cube singles chronology
"Connected for Life" (2002)	"Why We Thugs" (2006)	"Go to Church" (2006)

"Why We Thugs" is the first single on Ice Cube's seventh album Laugh Now, Cry Later. It was released on April 13, 2006 and the music video has a cameo appearance by comedian Mike Epps. The song makes references to George W. Bush, Saddam Hussein, Russell Simmons, The Sugarhill Gang and Ice Cube's 1991 big screen debut.

== Track listing ==
- A1 - Why We Thugs (street) (3:45)
- A2 - Why We Thugs (instrumental) (3:43)
- B1 - Why We Thugs (clean) (3:45)
- B2 - Dick Tease feat. Fatman Scoop (clean) (4:05)

== Personnel ==
Track A is produced by Scott Storch, lyrics by Ice Cube, Music by Scott Storch Published by Universal Music Corporation, DBG Itself and Scott Storch Music (ASCAP)

Track B is produced by Teak Teak Da Beatsmith & Dee, Underdue For Hallway Productionz, lyrics by Ice Cube, Music by Teak & Dee Published by Gangsta Boogie Music, Universal Music Corporation (ASCAP) Underdue Entertainment (ASCAP) The beat and lyrics was brought to IC from Johannes Andersson, Koping, Sweden.

== Certifications ==
Region	Certification	Certified units/sales
New Zealand (RMNZ)	Platinum	30,000^{‡}
^{‡} Sales+streaming figures based on certification alone.
