= Revenge of the Barracuda =

Studio album by WC
- Released: March 8, 2011
- Recorded: 2009–11
- Genre: West Coast hip hop; gangsta rap
- Length: 47:37
- Label: eOne
- Producer: eQ; Flip; Fredwreck; Hallway Productionz; Jah Zilla; Jiggolo; THX; Trick-Trick

WC chronology
Guilty by Affiliation (2007)	Revenge of the Barracuda (2011)	West Coast Gangsta Shit (2013)

Singles from Revenge of the Barracuda
- 1. "That's What I'm Talking About" Released: July 27, 2010; 2. "You Know Me" Released: February 1, 2011

Professional ratings
Review scores
Source	Rating
HipHopDX	3/5
RapReviews	7.5/10

Revenge of the Barracuda is the fourth solo studio album by American rapper WC. It was released on March 8, 2011, via eOne. Production was handled by Hallway Productionz, Jahzilla, EQ, Fredwreck, Jiggolo, THX and Trick-Trick. It features guest appearances from Young Maylay, Bad Lucc, Daz Dillinger, Ice Cube, Juvenile, Kokane, Kurupt, Soopafly and Traci Nelson.

The album peaked at number forty on the Top R&B/Hip-Hop Albums, number twenty on the Top Rap Albums and number 48 on the Independent Albums in the United States.

== Singles ==
The first single from the album is "That's What I'm Talking About", which is also included in an EP with the same name, released on July 27, 2010, the track was produced by the duo Hallway Productionz, and written by them and WC.

The second single is "You Know Me", which features Ice Cube and Young Maylay, was released on iTunes on February 1, 2011. This song has also produced by Hallway Productionz, and was written by the duo, WC, Cube and Maylay, alongside Jaret Griffin-Black.

== Track listing ==
No.	Title	Writer(s)	Producer(s)	Length
1.	"Revenge of the Barracuda" (featuring Traci Nelson)	William Calhoun Jr.; Traci Nelson; Deejan Underdue; Teak Underdue	Hallway Productionz	2:39
2.	"You Know Me" (featuring Ice Cube and Young Maylay)	Calhoun Jr.; O'Shea Jackson; Christopher Bellard; Charles "Uncle Chucc" Hamilton; Jeret Griffin-Black; D. Underdue; T. Underdue	Hallway Productionz	3:55
3.	"Reality Show"	Calhoun Jr.; D. Underdue; T. Underdue	Hallway Productionz	3:46
4.	"What's Good" (featuring Kokane)	Calhoun Jr.; Jerry Long; Pernell Suber	Jah Zilla	5:03
5.	"Walkin' in My Taylors"	Calhoun Jr.; Edward Ogbonna	eQ; Flip Matrix (co.)	4:04
6.	"That's What I'm Talking About"	Calhoun Jr.; D. Underdue; T. Underdue	Hallway Productionz	4:04
7.	"Stickin' to the Script" (featuring Daz Dillinger, Kurupt, Bad Lucc and Soopafly)	Calhoun Jr.; Delmar Arnaud; David Williams; Terence Harden; Priest Brooks; Christopher Daniel Goodman	Chris "THX" Goodman	3:43
8.	"100% Legit"	Calhoun Jr.; Jackson; Harden	Jah Zilla	3:46
9.	"D Boy"	Calhoun Jr.; Amir Perry	Jiggolo	4:39
10.	"Hustla" (featuring Juvenile)	Calhoun Jr.; Farid Nassar; Erik Coomes	Fredwreck	4:53
11.	"The Spot" (featuring Young Maylay)	Calhoun Jr.; Bellard; Harden	Fredwreck	3:29
12.	"Dub C"	Calhoun Jr.; Christian Mathis	Trick-Trick	4:14
Total length:				47:37

iTunes Store bonus tracks
No.	Title	Producer(s)	Length
13.	"Dr. Mandingo"	Chris "THX" Goodman	4:13
14.	"Back to the Basics" (featuring All City and Double Gunnz)	George Clark; Robert Brown	3:45

Japanese bonus tracks
No.	Title	Producer(s)	Length
13.	"It's Official"	Young Maylay
14.	"Frontline"	Terrace Martin
15.	"Dr. Mandingo"	Chris "THX" Goodman
16.	"Back to the Basics" (featuring All City and Double Gunnz)	George Clark; Robert Brown

== Personnel ==
- William "WC" Calhoun Jr. – main artist, songwriter
- Traci Nelson – vocals & songwriter (track 1)
- Teak "Tha Beatsmith" Underdue – producer & songwriter (tracks: 1–3, 6)
- Deejon Underdue – producer & songwriter (tracks: 1–3, 6)
- Fingaz McGee – vocal arrangement (track 1)
- O'Shea "Ice Cube" Jackson – featured artist (track 2), songwriter (tracks: 2, 8)
- Christopher "Young Maylay" Bellard – featured artist & songwriter (tracks: 2, 11)
- Charles "Uncle Chucc" Hamilton – vocals & songwriter (track 2)
- Jeret "J Black" Griffin-Black – songwriter (track 2)
- Jerry "Kokane" Long – featured artist & songwriter (track 4)
- Pernell "Jahzilla" Suber – producer (tracks: 4, 8), songwriter (track 4)
- Edward "eQ" Ogbonna – producer & songwriter (track 5)
- Flip Matrix – co-producer (track 5)
- Delmar "Daz Dillinger" Arnaud – featured artist & songwriter (track 7)
- Priest "Soopafly" Brooks – featured artist & songwriter (track 7)
- Ricardo "Kurupt" Brown – featured artist (track 7)
- David "Roscoe" Williams – songwriter (track 7)
- Terence "Bad Lucc" Harden – featured artist (track 7), songwriter (tracks: 7, 8, 11)
- Christopher "THX" Goodman – producer & songwriter (track 7)
- Amir "Jiggolo" Perry – producer & songwriter (track 9)
- Terius "Juvenile" Gray – featured artist (track 10)
- Farid "Fredwreck" Nassar – producer (tracks: 10, 11), guitar, keyboards & songwriter (track 10)
- Erik "Baby Jesus" Coomes – bass, guitar & songwriter (track 10)
- Chris "Trick-Trick" Mathis – producer, songwriter & mixing (track 12)
- David Lopez – mixing (tracks: 1–7, 9–11), recording (track 6), additional vocal recording (track 12)
- Kenny McCloud – recording (track 7)
- Lamar "Crazy Toones" Calhoun – scratches, additional arrangement
- Pascal Kerouche – design
- Bob Perry – A&R
- Chris Herche – marketing
- Shawnte Crespo – product manager
- Marleny Dominguez – label manager
- Courtney Lowery – publicity
- Giovanna Melchiorre – publicity

== Charts ==
Chart (2011)	Peak position
US Top R&B/Hip-Hop Albums (Billboard)	40
US Top Rap Albums (Billboard)	20
US Independent Albums (Billboard)	48
