= Stress (music producer) =

Swedish musician

- Born: Can Canatan; March 29, 1979 (age 47); Solna, Sweden
- Origin: Sweden/Turkey
- Genres: Hip Hop, R&B, Pop
- Occupation: Record producer
- Years active: 1998–present
- Labels: Roc Nation, Soblue Music Management
- Website: rocnation.com/artists/stress/

Can Canatan (born March 29, 1979), better known by his stage name Stress, is a Swedish musician and music producer.

== Biography and career ==
Canatan was born and raised in Solna, Stockholm. He began his music career as a DJ at the age of 16. By the time he turned 18 he gained recognition in the Swedish hip hop industry as a hip hop producer. Stress is now signed to Rocnation Publishing and is working internationally.

== Discography ==
=== Albums ===
Year	Album	Peak positions
Year	Album	SWE
2011	Playlist	
2011	Playlist 2	
2020	Playlist 3	

=== Production ===
Sweden

Produced entirely by "Stress"

- 2007: Serhado — Xewna Jiyan (Hiphop bi Kurdî) (Studio album)
- 2012: Kartellen – Ånger och kamp (Studio album)
- 2013: Abidaz – In och ut (Studio album)
- 2013: Kartellen – Ånger och Kamp 2 (Studio album)

USA/Abroad

- 2005: Pretty Ricky – "Call Me"
- 2011: Nikos Ganos – "Break Me"
- 2012: K Koke – "Only One"
- 2013: Mindless Behavior – "I'm Fallin" from album All Around the World
