= Bone-Appetit! =

Greatest hits album by T-Bone
- Released: September 25, 2007
- Genre: Christian rap

T-Bone chronology
Bone-A-Fide (2005)	Bone-Appetit! (2007)

Bone-Appetit: Servin' Up Tha Hits is the ninth official album from Christian rapper, T-Bone. It is a combination of greatest hits from his past three albums plus some exclusives and hard-to-find fan favorites. It was released September 25, 2007. For this album he was nominated for two Grammy Awards.

== Track listing ==
1. Follow T
2. Ride Wit Me
3. Sing Your Praises [Featuring Natalie LaRue and Mark Stuart of Audio Adrenaline]
4. I Been Lookin' Around [Featuring Rachael Lampa] - produced by Hallway Productionz
5. Let That Thing Go [Featuring Mista Grimm] - produced by Hallway Productionz
6. Dippin'
7. Wipe Your Tears
8. Blazin' Microphones
9. Can I Live [Featuring LaShawn Daniels]
10. Turn This Up
11. Gospelalphamegafunkyboogiediscomusic [Featuring KRS-One]
12. Few Good Men [Featuring Mack 10]
13. Shake Your Body
14. Raised In Harlem [Featuring Michael Tait]
15. King Of My Life [Featuring Natalie LaRue]
16. Penecostal Horse Racing
17. Name Droppin' [Featuring Eric Dawkins] - produced by Hallway Productionz
18. Sing Your Praises (Spanish Version) [Featuring Natalie LaRue and Mark Stuart of Audio Adrenaline]
