= The Streets (song) =

Single by WC featuring Snoop Dogg and Nate Dogg

Single by WC featuring Snoop Dogg and Nate Dogg

from the album Ghetto Heisman
- Released: July 23, 2002
- Recorded: 2002
- Studio: Enterprise Studios (Los Angeles, California)
- Genre: West Coast hip hop; gangsta rap
- Length: 3:47
- Label: Def Jam
- Songwriters: William Calhoun Jr.; Calvin Broadus; Nathaniel Hale; Scott Storch
- Producer: Scott Storch

WC singles chronology
"Connected for Life" (2002)	"The Streets" (2002)	"Flirt" (2003)

Snoop Dogg singles chronology
"Undercova Funk (Give Up the Funk)" (2002)	"The Streets" (2002)	"From tha Chuuuch to da Palace" (2002)

Nate Dogg singles chronology
"Multiply" (2002)	"The Streets" (2002)	"Get Up" (2003)

Music video
- "The Streets" on YouTube

"The Streets" is a song by American rapper WC featuring fellow West Coast hip-hop recording artists Snoop Dogg and Nate Dogg. It was released on July 23, 2002, through Def Jam Recordings as the lead single from his second solo studio album Ghetto Heisman. Production was handled by Scott Storch. An official remix featuring rapper Xzibit was also released.

In the United States, the single peaked at number 81 on the Billboard Hot 100, number 43 on the Hot R&B/Hip-Hop Songs and number 20 on the Hot Rap Songs charts. It also made it to number 48 on the UK singles chart and number 13 on the Official Hip Hop and R&B Singles Chart in the United Kingdom.

== Music video ==
The music video, directed by Chris Robinson, was shot in the Los Angeles Memorial Coliseum and features a competition called the "Ghetto Olympics". It opens with WC running from the police while holding a torch, which he uses to light a flame signaling the beginning of the contest. While WC, Snoop Dogg and Nate Dogg perform, Ghetto Olympians participate in a race involving jumping over backyard fences, as well as competitions of crip walking, hair braiding, "pimp beauty", tattooing and Kool-Aid making. WC rolls a pair of dice in the finals.

== Track listing ==
US
No.	Title	Writer(s)	Producer(s)	Length
1.	"The Streets (Radio Version)" (featuring Nate Dogg)	William Calhoun Jr.; Nathaniel Hale; Scott Storch	Scott Storch
2.	"The Streets (LP Version)" (featuring Nate Dogg)	Calhoun Jr.; Hale; Storch	Scott Storch
3.	"The Streets (Instrumental)"		Scott Storch
4.	"Wanna Ride (Radio Version)" (featuring Ice Cube and MC Ren)	Calhoun Jr.; O'Shea Jackson; Lorenzo Patterson; Tony Pizarro; Floyd Wilcox	Tony Pizarro; Flip
5.	"Wanna Ride (LP Version)" (featuring Ice Cube and MC Ren)	Calhoun Jr.; Jackson; Patterson; Pizarro; Wilcox	Tony Pizarro; Flip
6.	"Wanna Ride (Instrumental)"

UK
No.	Title	Producer(s)	Length
1.	"The Streets (Radio Edit)" (featuring Snoop Dogg and Nate Dogg)	Scott Storch	4:07
2.	"The Streets (Instrumental)"	Scott Storch	4:06
3.	"Walk (Album Version) (Explicit)" (featuring Ice Cube and Mack 10)	DJ Battlecat	4:00
Total length:			12:13

== Charts ==
Chart (2002)	Peak position
US Billboard Hot 100	81
US Hot R&B/Hip-Hop Songs (Billboard)	43
US R&B/Hip-Hop Airplay (Billboard)	41
US Hot Rap Songs (Billboard)	20
US Rhythmic Airplay (Billboard)	21

Chart (2003)	Peak position
Ireland (IRMA)	38
UK Singles (Official Charts)	48
UK Hip Hop/R&B (Official Charts)	13
