= All Around the World (Mindless Behavior album) =

Studio album by Mindless Behavior
- Released: March 12, 2013
- Recorded: 2012–2013
- Genre: R&B; pop; hip hop
- Length: 42:27
- Label: Streamline; Interscope
- Producer: Walter Millsap III; Hallway Productionz; Jason Twist; Sean Garrett; Rob "T'RON" Wells; Team S. Dot; Stress

Mindless Behavior chronology
#1 Girl (2011)	All Around the World (2013)	#OfficialMBMusic (2016)

Singles from All Around the World
- 1. "Keep Her on the Low" Released: January 22, 2013; 2. "All Around the World" Released: March 1, 2013; 3. "Used to Be" Released: July 30, 2013

All Around the World is the second studio album by American boy band Mindless Behavior. It was released on March 12, 2013, by Streamline and Interscope Records. Like their previous album, this album contains the elements of pop and R&B in their music and focuses primarily on themes of love. This is also the last album to feature original members Prodigy, Roc Royal, and Ray Ray.

== Reception ==
The album rose to number 6 on the US Billboard 200, and reached at number one on the Top R&B/Hip-Hop Albums. In their first week, the album outsold the band's debut album, selling 37,000 in its first week. The album has sold 115,000 copies in the United States as of June 2016.

== Track listing ==
No.	Title	Producer(s)	Length
1.	"All Around the World"	Walter Millsap III; Hallway Productionz	4:08
2.	"Keep Her on the Low"	Sean Garrett; Team S. Dot; Jason Twist	3:08
3.	"Used to Be"	Walter W. Millsap III; Candice C. Nelson; Dewayne Swan; Lakeisha R. Gamble	3:55
4.	"I Lean" (featuring Soulja Boy)	Walter Millsap III; Hallway Productionz	4:41
5.	"Pretty Girl" (featuring Jacob Latimore and Lil Twist)	Walter Millsap III; Hallway Productionz	3:58
6.	"I'm Falling"	Ester Dean; Can "Stress" Canatan	4:00
7.	"Ready for Love"	Walter Millsap III; Marcus "Epidemik" Walker	3:23
8.	"Band-Aid"	Rob "T'RON" Wells; Rupert Gayle; Max Gousse; Ursula Yancy; Walter Millsap III; Candice C. Nelson; Lakeisha R. Gamble; Malik Sorey	3:15
9.	"Forever"	Walter W. Millsap III; Candice C. Nelson; Lakeisha R. Gamble; Gary Spriggs; Sean Marshall; Ericka Watson	3:51
10.	"Video"	Sean Garrett; Team S. Dot; Jason Twist	3:47
11.	"Brightside"	Walter Millsap III	4:21

Target Deluxe Edition
No.	Title	Length
12.	"Lookin for Ya"
13.	"Bang Bang Bang"
14.	"Your Favorite Song"
15.	"House Party"

== Charts ==
=== Weekly charts ===
Chart (2013)	Peak position
US Billboard 200	6
US Top R&B/Hip-Hop Albums (Billboard)	1

=== Year-end charts ===
Chart (2013)	Position
US Top R&B/Hip-Hop Albums (Billboard)	57
