= Laugh Now, Cry Later =

Studio album by Ice Cube
- Released: June 6, 2006
- Recorded: 2005–06
- Genres: West Coast hip-hop; gangsta rap; political hip-hop
- Length: 64:51
- Label: Lench Mob
- Producers: Lil Jon; Scott Storch; the Hitmen; Swizz Beatz; DJ Green Lantern; Emile; Warren G; Hallway Productionz; Bud'da; Sketch; Laylaw; D-Mac

Ice Cube chronology
Greatest Hits (2001)	Laugh Now, Cry Later (2006)	Raw Footage (2008)

Singles from Laugh Now, Cry Later
- 1. "Why We Thugs" Released: April 13, 2006; 2. "Go to Church" Released: June 1, 2006

Professional ratings
Review scores
Source	Rating
About.com	3.5/5 stars
AllHipHop	(7/10)
AllMusic	3.5/5 stars
HipHopDX	4/5 stars
Okayplayer	4.5/5 stars
RapReviews	(7.5/10)
Rolling Stone	3/5 stars
The Source	4/5 stars
USA Today	3/4 stars
Vibe	4/5 stars

Laugh Now, Cry Later is the seventh studio album by rapper Ice Cube, released on June 6, 2006. It was released on his independently owned record label Lench Mob Records. This album is his first studio album in six years since his previous album, War & Peace Vol. 2 (The Peace Disc). After spending the previous six years mainly doing movie projects, it could be considered a comeback album.

The album received generally positive reviews from critics and debuted at number four on the US Billboard 200 selling 144,000 copies in first week. The album was certified gold by the Recording Industry Association of America (RIAA) in August 2006.

== Background ==
Unlike Cube's previous album, Laugh Now, Cry Later features only a handful of collaborations. These include songs with West Coast rappers Snoop Dogg and WC, and Southern rapper Lil Jon. Laugh Now, Cry Later was preceded by the street single and accompanying video "Chrome & Paint". The first official single was the Scott Storch produced "Why We Thugs". The follow-up single, released in late June 2006, is the song "Go to Church", featuring Snoop Dogg and Lil Jon. The third single released from the album was the promo-only "Steal the Show".

In the song "Growin' Up" he talks about and honours his deceased friend and co-rapper Eazy-E who along with Ice Cube were members of rap group N.W.A. "Never thought I'd see Eazy in a casket, thanks for everything, that's on everything. I learnt a lot of game from you, I like your son, he's got his name from you".

In an interview taken during its release, Ice Cube said: "I want to make a record that was like a history book. I wanted to make a record that does what all good hip-hop does: it makes you feel good; it kind of pumps you up, but it also shows you a part of life that you might not have been paying attention to or might not even know exists".

== Release ==
The album was released independently on his Lench Mob Records on June 6, 2006. Five months later, Ice Cube re-released the album on October 31, 2006, under the name Laugh Now, Cry Later: O.G. Limited Edition. The DualDisc contains concert and backstage footage as well as a playable music video for each song. The artwork for this album contains a picture of Ice Cube holding a custom gold Colt Anaconda. A clean version of the album was also made. It replaces most of the profanities by repeating or using a sound effect.

== Commercial performance ==
Laugh Now, Cry Later debuted at number four on the US Billboard 200, selling 144,000 copies in its first week. This became Ice Cube's sixth US top-ten album. In its second week, the album dropped to number ten on the chart, selling an additional 64,000 copies. On August 25, 2006, the album was certified gold by the Recording Industry Association of America (RIAA) for sales of over 500,000 copies. As of August 2008, the album sold 547,000 copies in the United States.

== Track listing ==
No.	Title	Producer(s)	Length
1.	"Definition of a West Coast G (Intro)"		0:14
2.	"Why We Thugs"	Scott Storch	3:45
3.	"Smoke Some Weed"	Bud'da	3:46
4.	"Dimes & Nicks (A Call from Mike Epps)"		1:06
5.	"Child Support"	Hallway Productionz	4:01
6.	"2 Decades Ago (Insert)"		0:14
7.	"Doin' What It 'Pose 2Do"	Emile	4:07
8.	"Laugh Now, Cry Later"	Sean C	3:36
9.	"Stop Snitchin'"	Swizz Beatz	3:15
10.	"Go to Church" (featuring Snoop Dogg and Lil' Jon)	Lil' Jon	4:00
11.	"The Nigga Trapp"	DJ Green Lantern	3:48
12.	"A History of Violence (Insert)"		1:09
13.	"Growin' Up"	Laylaw; D-Mac	3:53
14.	"Click, Clack - Get Back!"	Emile	3:09
15.	"The Game Lord"	Hallway Productionz	4:09
16.	"Chrome & Paint" (featuring WC)	Bud'da	3:27
17.	"Steal the Show"	Scott Storch	4:12
18.	"You Gotta Lotta That" (featuring Snoop Dogg)	Lil Jon	4:06
19.	"Spittin' Pollaseeds" (featuring WC and Kokane)	Laylaw; D-Mac	5:04
20.	"Holla @ Cha' Boy"	Lil' Jon	3:30

iTunes bonus track
No.	Title	Producer(s)	Length
21.	"Pockets Stay Fat" (featuring Lil Scrappy)	DJ Green Lantern	3:55

Best Buy bonus tracks
No.	Title	Producer(s)	Length
21.	"Run"	J.R. Rotem	3:35
22.	"Race Card"	Warren G	3:57

Japanese bonus track
No.	Title	Producer(s)	Length
21.	"Dick Tease" (featuring Fatman Scoop)	Hallway Productionz	4:02

== Samples ==
- "Chrome & Paint" – contains a sample of "The Continental Walk" by Hank Ballard
- "Click, Clack - Get Back!" – contains a sample of "Captain Bobby Stout" by the Jerry Hahn Brotherhood
- "Spittin' Pollaseeds" – contains a sample of "Baby" by Brandy
- "A History of Violence" – contains a sample of "Memory Lane" by Minnie Riperton and a sample of "In the House – In a Heartbeat" by John Murphy
- "Child Support" – contains a sample of "Kick in the Door" by the Notorious B.I.G.
- "Growin' Up" – contains a sample of "Memory Lane" by Minnie Riperton
- "Laugh Now, Cry Later" – contains a sample of "Master Plan" by Alan Tew
- "Stop Snitchin'" – contains a sample of "Gangsta Gangsta" by N.W.A

== Charts ==
=== Weekly charts ===
Chart (2006)	Peak position
Australian Albums (ARIA)	46
French Albums (SNEP)	129
Canadian Albums (Billboard)	9
New Zealand Albums (RMNZ)	33
Swiss Albums (Schweizer Hitparade)	63
UK Albums (Official Charts)	152
UK R&B Albums (Official Charts)	11
US Billboard 200	4
US Top R&B/Hip-Hop Albums (Billboard)	2
US Top Rap Albums (Billboard)	2

=== Year-end charts ===
Chart (2006)	Position
US Billboard 200	137
US Top R&B/Hip-Hop Albums (Billboard)	36

== Certifications ==
Region	Certification	Certified units/sales
Canada (Music Canada)	Gold	50,000^{^}
United States (RIAA)	Gold	500,000^{^}
^{^} Shipments figures based on certification alone.
