= T-Bone (rapper) =

American rapper (born 1973)

- Also known as: Boney Bone Corleone, Bone Soprano, T
- Born: Rene Francisco Sotomayor; August 11, 1973 (age 53); San Francisco, California, US
- Genres: Christian hip hop
- Occupations: Rapper; activist
- Instruments: Rapping, beatboxing
- Years active: 1989–present
- Labels: Metro One; Flicker/Boneyard; Sony Provident; Canzion Group LP; Heaven Music Group
- Website: houseoftbone.com

Rene Francisco Sotomayor (born August 11, 1973), better known by his stage name T-Bone, is a Christian rapper. His father was Nicaraguan and his mother is Salvadoran. His name came from being called 'Bones' as a youngster because he was very skinny. The 'T' was "added to give the name a little slang edge."

== Career ==
T-Bone started rapping at the age of seven at parties and in rap battles. After opening for a rock group, he signed his first record deal.

He released three albums on the independent Metro One record label: Redeemed Hoodlum (1993), Tha Life of a Hoodlum(1995) and Tha Hoodlum's Testimony(1996). All three albums were characterized as gangsta rap albums, which was rare in Christian music at the time. In 1997, he released History of a Hoodlum, a compilation of hits from his first three albums, on the Metro One record label.

After a brief hiatus, T-Bone released his fourth album, and first on the Flicker Records music label, The Last Street Preacha, in 2001. It received critical acclaim, was nominated for the Rock Gospel Album Grammy Award, and saw T-Bone break into the contemporary Christian music market. It was the first rap album to debut at No. 7 on the Christian Contemporary Music charts.

In 2002, there was an increased exposure of T-Bone to both Christian and mainstream markets with the release of his fifth album, Gospelalphamegafunkyboogiediscomusic. The album was characterized by the guest appearance of hip-hop legend KRS-One on the title track – returning the favor of the controversial guest spot T-Bone had made on KRS-One's Spiritual Minded album earlier in the year.

In 2005, T-Bone released one of his most successful album, Bone-A-Fide. The cover controversially featured him in an image evoking Che Guevara, leading to concerns that he was promoting communist ideologies – charges he denied. Adding to the controversy were collaborations with two major secular rappers, Mack 10 and Chino XL.

Bone-A-Fide was his first album not to be produced by long-time collaborator Chase Dante, and saw T-Bone move away from the previous West Coast sound of his earlier albums to a smoother East Coast sound. In 2005, he was also featured as Jairus in the rock opera !Hero, along with Michael Tait of Tait and dc Talk, Rebecca St. James and Mark Stuart of Audio Adrenaline.

Bone-Appétit: Servin' Up tha Hits, a compilation set of hits from his last three albums, was released on September 25, 2007.

Pa mi Dios y Pa mi Gente (For My God and For My People) was released on April 7, 2017, and Broken English was released on March 15, 2018.

== Filmography ==
=== Film ===
T-Bone's first major film role was playing the role of Briggs, a rapping prisoner in the 2003 comedy-romance The Fighting Temptations (starring Cuba Gooding Jr. and Beyoncé Knowles). In the film, T-Bone performs the song "To da River" with secular artists Lil Zane and Montell Jordan. He also starred in Black Rose in 2003.

T-Bone co-starred in the 2006 MTV film, via Paramount Pictures, All You've Got. His other films include the Carman and Stephen Yake's R.I.O.T. (1995), The Rally (2009) and I'm in Love with a Church Girl (2013).

=== Television ===
- Real Videos (TBN): host 1997-2008
- TX 10 (JCTV): host beginning in 2006
- Hope and Glory (Gospel Music Channel)
- Hispanic College Quiz (NBC): co-host

== Works ==
=== Albums ===
Year	Title	Record label	Producer
1993	Redeemed Hoodlum	Metro One	LA Posse
1995	Tha Life of a Hoodlum	Metro One	LA Posse
1996	Tha Hoodlum's Testimony	Metro One	LA Posse
1997	History of a Hoodlum (compilation album)	Metro One	LA Posse
2001	Tha Last Street Preacha	Flicker/Boneyard	T-BONE
2001	The Boneyard Box Set (compilation album)	Metro One	LA Posse
2002	Gospelalphamegafunkyboogiediscomusic	Flicker/Boneyard	T-BONE
2005	Bone-A-Fide	Flicker/Boneyard/Provident/Sony/BMG	T-BONE
2007	Bone-Appétit: Servin' Up tha Hits (compilation album)	Boneyard/Provident-Integrity Distribution	T-BONE
2017	Pa mi Dios y Pa mi Gente	Canzion Group LP	T-BONE
2018	Broken English	Heaven Music Group	T-BONE

=== Collaborative works ===
- Appeared in the rock opera !Hero both on the recording and touring show.

=== Music videos ===
- "Lyrical Assassin" produced by Dough Green (1992)
- "Throwing Out tha Wicked" produced by Bill Boyde (1996)
- "Ride Wit' Me" produced by King Tech for Bolo Entertainment (2001)
- "Can I Live" produced by Kenn Michael for CODEKRAFT (2005)
- "Name Droppin'" (2007)
- "Volare" featuring Marcos Witt (2016)
- "Chuurch" (2018)
- "Ain't Ashamed" (2018)

=== Films ===
- Black Rose short film (2004)
- R.I.O.T. (Righteous Invasion of Truth) via Steven Yake Productions (1995)
- The Fighting Temptations via MTV Entertainment Studios & Paramount Pictures (2003)
- All You've Got via MTV Entertainment Studios & Paramount Pictures (2006)
- I'm in Love with a Church Girl via RGM Films LLC (2013)

=== Other ===
- Performer at 2004 GMA Gospel Music's Dove Awards (UPN, PAX)
- Featured performer at the 2003 MovieGuide Awards
- Featured performer/Presenter at the 2003 Arpa Awards (Telemundo/Univision)
- Presenter at 2001 Stellar Awards
- Featured performer at the 2000 ALMA Awards with Kirk Franklin
- Television appearances include "E!", "Live at the Apollo", "MTV's "The Cut" and "From the Church to the Charts", "LA TV", "Urban Latino", "Despierta America" (Univision), "Entertainment News" (Telemundo), "Entertainment News" (MGM Latin American Network), and "Keeping it Real" (Soundtrack Channel)

== Awards and nominations ==
=== Grammy Nominations ===
- Best Rock Gospel Album: Tha Last Street Preacha (2001)
- Best Rap/Rock Gospel Album of the Year: Bone-a-fide! (2007)
- Best Gospel Performance: "With Long Life" with Israel Houghton (2007)

=== Visionary Award Nominations ===
- Hip Hop/Rap Performer of the Year (2009)

== Dove Awards ==
2008:

- Winner of Rap/Hip-Hop Song of the Year "Name-Droppin"

2004:

- Winner of special event album (!Hero, a rock opera)
- Nomination for Rap/Hip-Hop Album (Gospelalphamegafunkyboogiediscomusic)
- Nomination for Rap/Hip-Hop Recorded Song (Raised in Harlem from !Hero)

2002:

- Nomination for Rap/Hip-Hop Album, (Tha Last Street Preacha)
- Nomination for Rap/Hip-Hop Recorded Song (Ride Wit Me)
- Nomination for Rap/Hip-Hop Recorded (King of My Life)

1997:

- Nomination for Rap/Hip Hop Album (Tha Hoodlums Testimony)
- Nomination for Rap/Hip Hop Recorded Song (Keep on Praising)

1995:

- Nomination for Rap/Hip-Hop Album (Tha Life of a Hoodlum)
- Nomination for Rap/Hip-Hop Recorded Song" (Throwing Out Tha Wicked)

1993:

- Nomination for Rap/Hip Hop Album (Redeemed Hoodlum)
- Nomination for Rap/Hip Hop Recorded Song (Lyrical Assassin)

== Collaborations ==
=== Songs ===
- "Alabemos" by Marcos Witt ( Sigues Siendo Dios )
- "Gospelalphamegafunkyboogiediscomusic" KRS-One
- "With Long Life" Israel & New Breed
- "Lonely Man" Audio Arenaline (Lift)
- "We're a Band" Audio Adrenaline (Live from Hawaii)
- "A Few Good Men" Mack 10
- "You Can't Win" Chino XL
- "1,2,3 Praise!" Virtue
- "Joy" Feat. Joi of Brownstone
- "The Slam" tobyMac
- "The Slam [d Dubb Remix]" tobyMac
- "Rubber House" Rachael Lampa
- "With Long Life" Israel & New Breed
- "To Da River" featuring Lil' Zane and Montell Jordan (from The Fighting Temptations)
- "I'm Thankful" by Yolanda Adams (from the album Believe)
- "With long life" by Israel Houghton and New Breed
- "Te Amo," by Israel and New Breed
- "I Can't Schleep" by J.C. Crew
- "Mi Dios es grande" by Josue Del Cid
- "Wrapped Up (Remix)" by Dawkins & Dawkins
- "What a Fool I've Been" by Crystal Lewis (also features J-Raw)

== Soundtracks ==
- "To Da River," featuring Montell Jordan and Lil' Zane from "The Fighting Temptations Soundtrack"
- "Raised in Harlem," featuring Michael Tait for !Hero
- "The Struggle Continues," featuring KRS-ONE for Spiritual Minded
- "I'm Thankful," featuring Yolanda Adams for Believe
- "Lonely Man," featuring Audio Adrenaline for Lift
- "My Story" and " God is Exalted," featuring Carman for R.I.O.T.
- "Little Jackie" and "What a Fool I've Been," featuring Crystal Lewis for Fearless
- "King of My Life," featuring Natalie LaRue for Soul Lift
- "Wrapped Up," featuring Dawkins and Dawkins for Focus
- "Sooner or Later," featuring Freedom of Soul for The 2 nd Coming
- "Watcha Gonna Do," featuring JC and the Boyz for Chill 4 A While
- "I Can't Schleep," featuring J.C. Crew for Serius Bizness
- "With Long Life," Featuring Israel and New Breed for A Deeper Level
- "Te Amo," featuring Israel and New Breed Jesus at the Center
- "Alabemos," featuring Marcos Witt (Album : Sigues Siendo Dios )

=== Producers ===
- Fredwreck (Dr. Dre, Snoop Dogg, Xzibit, Dogg Pound, Westside Connection, Mack 10)
- Warryn Campbell (Snoop Dogg, Missy Elliott, Mary Mary)
- Bosko (Kanye West, LiL Jon, E-40, Master P)
- Jimmy Jam and Terry Lewis (Janet Jackson, Michael Jackson, Prince, Whitney Houston)
- Darkchild (Destiny's Child, Brandy, Christina Aguilera, Brian McKnight, Mary J. Blige, Kirk Franklin)
- King Tech (Eminem, Sly Boogie, Chino XL, Common)
- Tommy Simms (Babyface, Eric Clapton, Carman)
- Rex Rideout (Mary J. Blige, Angie Stone, Luther Vandross, The Temptations)
- Buster and Shavoni (Yolanda Adams, Kirk Franklin, God's Property)
- Avila Bros. (Jessica Simpson, Janet Jackson, Usher, Mariah Carey, Macy Gray)
- Bobby "Bobcat" Ervin (2pac, Ice Cube, LL Cool J, Mack 10, Eazy E)
- Dwayne "Muffla" Simon (Run DMC, LL Cool J, King Tee)
- Chase (Dr. Dre, Az Yet, Rakeem, KRS-ONE, Mista Grimm)
- David Bannister (Carman, Cee-Cee Winans, Jaci Velasquez)

== Additional highlights ==
- Lifetime music sales exceed 800,000 units
- Selected to do commercials on MTV for "The Cut"
- Did four commercials on MTV with Beyonce and Mike Epps for "The Fighting Temptations"
- Partnered in 2008 with the Hands & Feet Project, started by Christian band Audio Adrenaline, to build churches and an orphanage in Nicaragua. T-Bone's parents will be moving to Nicaragua to run a children's village.
