= Better Days (WC song) =

1998 single by WC featuring Ron Banks

Single by WC

from the album The Shadiest One
- Released: September 29, 1998
- Genre: Gangsta rap; g-funk; West Coast hip hop
- Length: 3:53
- Label: Payday; FFRR
- Songwriter(s): William Calhoun Jr.; Jay Williams; Maurice Thompson; Frankie Beverly
- Producer(s): Barr Nine Productions

WC singles chronology
"Just Clownin'" (1997)	"Better Days" (1998)	"Connected for Life" (2002)

Music video
- "Better Days" on YouTube

"Better Days" is a song by American rapper WC and the second single from his debut studio album The Shadiest One (1998). Produced by Barr Nine Productions, it features Ron Banks of The Dramatics.

An alternative version of the song features American singer Jon B.

== Background ==
"Better Days" was one of several tracks from The Shadiest One which WC considered for a single following "Just Clownin'", along with "Keep Hustlin'", "Fuckin' wit Uh House Party" and "Can't Hold Back". It was later released as his second solo single on September 29, 1998.

== Charts ==
Chart (1998)	Peak position
US Billboard Hot 100	64
US Hot R&B/Hip Hop Songs (Billboard)	33
US Hot Rap Songs (Billboard)	4
