= Gangsta Nation =

- Gangsta Nation CD cover

Single by Westside Connection featuring Nate Dogg

from the album Terrorist Threats
- Released: October 14, 2003
- Genre: West Coast hip hop; gangsta rap
- Length: 4:04
- Label: Priority
- Songwriter(s): O'Shea Jackson; Dedrick Rolison; William Calhoun, Jr.; Nathaniel Hale; Farid Nassar
- Producer(s): Fredwreck

Westside Connection singles chronology
"It's the Holidaze" (2002)	"Gangsta Nation" (2003)

Nate Dogg singles chronology
"21 Questions" (2003)	"Gangsta Nation" (2003)	"Ooh Wee" (2003)

Music video
- "Gangsta Nation" on YouTube

"Gangsta Nation" is a song by American West Coast hip hop/gangsta rap supergroup Westside Connection featuring Nate Dogg. It was released on October 14, 2003 via Priority Records as the only single from the group's second studio album Terrorist Threats. Written by all the three members, Ice Cube, Mack 10 and WC, as well as Nate Dogg and Fredwreck, it was produced by the latter. Mike Epps made a cameo appearance in the music video, which was directed by Dave Meyers.

The single peaked at number 33 on the US Billboard Hot 100, number 66 in Australia and France, and number 89 in Germany.

== Track listing ==
No.	Title	Writer(s)	Producer(s)	Length
1.	"Gangsta Nation" (Clean Version)	O'Shea Jackson; Dedrick Rolison; William Calhoun; Nathaniel Hale; Farid Nassar	Fredwreck	4:44
2.	"Gangsta Nation" (Album Version)	Jackson; Rolison; Calhoun; Hale; Nassar	Fredwreck	4:44
3.	"Gangsta Nation" (Instrumental)	Jackson; Rolison; Calhoun; Hale; Nassar	Fredwreck	4:24
4.	"Get Ignit" (Clean Version)	Jackson; Rolison; Calhoun; Ron Feemster	Neff-U	4:32
5.	"Get Ignit" (Album Version)	Jackson; Rolison; Calhoun; Feemster	Neff-U	4:30
6.	"Get Ignit" (Instrumental)	Jackson; Rolison; Calhoun; Feemster	Neff-U	4:29

== Charts ==
=== Weekly charts ===
Chart (2003)	Peak position
Australia (ARIA)	66
France (SNEP)	66
Germany (GfK)	89
US Billboard Hot 100	33
US Hot R&B/Hip-Hop Songs (Billboard)	22
US Hot Rap Songs (Billboard)	9
US Rhythmic (Billboard)	7

=== Year-end charts ===
Chart (2004)	Position
US Hot R&B/Hip-Hop Songs (Billboard)	91

== Certifications ==
Certification for "Gangsta Nation"
Region	Certification	Certified units/sales
New Zealand (RMNZ)	Platinum	30,000^{‡}
^{‡} Sales+streaming figures based on certification alone.
