= Just Clownin' =

1997 single by WC

Single by WC

from the album The Shadiest One
- Released: November 11, 1997
- Genre: Gangsta rap; g-funk; West Coast hip hop
- Length: 3:59
- Label: Payday; FFRR
- Songwriter(s): William Calhoun Jr.; Kevin Gilliam; Walter "Junie" Morrison
- Producer(s): Battlecat

WC singles chronology
"Just Clownin'" (1997)	"Better Days" (1998)

Music video
- "Just Clownin'" on YouTube

"Just Clownin'" is a song by American rapper WC, released on November 11, 1997, as the lead single from his debut studio album The Shadiest One (1998). Produced by Battlecat, it is his highest-charting song as a solo artist, peaking at number 56 on the Billboard Hot 100.

== Content ==
In the song, WC details his history of life in the streets, mentioning successful acts of the time. In addition, he forewarns the young people not to test him since he is experienced.

== Charts ==
Chart (1997–98)	Peak position
US Billboard Hot 100	56
US Hot R&B/Hip Hop Songs (Billboard)	18
US Hot Rap Songs (Billboard)	3
