= Bow Down (Westside Connection song) =

1996 single by Westside Connection

Single by Westside Connection

from the album Bow Down
- B-side: "Hoo-Bangin'"
- Released: August 17, 1996
- Studio: Westside Studios (California)
- Genre: G-funk
- Length: 3:27
- Label: Priority
- Songwriters: O'Shea Jackson; Dedrick Rolison; William Calhoun
- Producer: Bud'da

Westside Connection singles chronology
"Bow Down" (1996)	"Gangstas Make the World Go Round" (1997)

Music video
- "Bow Down" on YouTube

"Bow Down" is a song by rap group Westside Connection. It was released as the lead single from their debut album of the same name.

The song became the most successful single released by the group, peaking at number 21 on the Billboard Hot 100, while also topping the rap chart at number one. As one of the more popular West Coast hip hop songs, it has appeared on numerous compilations, including Featuring...Ice Cube, The N.W.A Legacy, Vol. 1 and Ice Cube's 2001 Greatest Hits album, among others. It also appeared in the 2002 film, The Hot Chick.

This song is parodied in the comedy show Mind of Mencia, in which Carlos Mencia makes a sketch about 4 rappers making songs about their experiences behind bars.

The bonus song "Hoo Bangin" featured on this single is actually a Mack 10 song that features Ice Cube and was not released officially as Westside Connection material besides its appearance on this release. However, a remix of it appears on the full-length album.

== Track listing ==
1. Bow Down (Explicit)
2. Bow Down (T.V. Clean)
3. Bow Down (Clean)
4. Hoo Bangin' (Explicit)
5. Hoo Bangin' (Instrumental)
6. Hoo Bangin' (Clean)

== Chart history ==
=== Peak positions ===
Chart (1996)	Peak position
Billboard Hot 100	21
Billboard Hot R&B/Hip-Hop Singles & Tracks	19
Billboard Hot Rap Singles	1
Billboard Hot Dance Music/Maxi-Singles Sales	8
Billboard Rhythmic Top 40	39

=== Year-end charts ===
End of year chart (1996)	Position
Billboard Hot R&B/Hip-Hop Singles	98
Billboard Hot Rap Singles	18
