= Bow Down =

Studio album by Westside Connection
- Released: October 22, 1996
- Recorded: 1995–1996
- Studios: Westside (California); Treehouse (South Africa)
- Genres: West Coast hip-hop; gangsta rap; G-funk; hardcore hip-hop
- Length: 48:12
- Label: Priority
- Producers: Ice Cube (also exec.); Binky Mack; Bud'da; QDIII; Cedric Samson

Westside Connection chronology
Bow Down (1996)	Terrorist Threats (2003)

Singles from Bow Down
- 1. "Bow Down" Released: August 17, 1996; 2. "Gangstas Make the World Go Round" Released: January 24, 1997

Bow Down is the debut studio album by American West Coast hip-hop supergroup Westside Connection. It was released on October 22, 1996, through Priority Records. The recording sessions took place at Ice Cube's house studio, Westsiiiiide Studios, in California, except for the song "Gangstas Make the World Go Round", which was recorded at Treehouse Studios in South Africa. The production was handled by Bud'da, Quincy Jones III, Binky Mack, and Ice Cube, who also served as executive producer. It features guest appearances from Allfrumtha I and the Comrads.

The album peaked at number two on the Billboard 200 and topped the Top R&B/Hip-Hop Albums, shipping 145,000 units. It went on to sell 1.7 million copies in the United States receiving Platinum certification status by the Recording Industry Association of America on January 10, 1997. It was also certified Gold by Canadian Recording Industry Association for selling 50,000 units in Canada.

Its singles, the title track and "Gangstas Make the World Go Round", made it to the Billboard Hot 100, landing at number 21 and 40, respectively. The songs "King of the Hill", "Cross 'Em out and Put a 'K" and "Hoo Bangin' (WSCG Style)" are diss tracks towards hip hop group Cypress Hill, Q-Tip and rapper Common.

== Critical reception ==
Professional ratings
Review scores
Source	Rating
AllMusic	4/5 stars
Entertainment Weekly	C
Los Angeles Times	2/4 stars
Muzik	3.5/5 stars
RapReviews	9/10
Rolling Stone	3.5/5 stars
The Source	4.5/5 stars
The Village Voice	D+

The Indianapolis Star called the album "one of the strongest gauntlet-throw-downs on disc, but it may well be a last gasp from the gangsta style that is suffering from Tupac Shakur's murder."

== Track listing ==
No.	Title	Writer(s)	Producer(s)	Length
1.	"World Domination" (Intro)			1:16
2.	"Bow Down"	O'Shea Jackson; Dedrick Rolison; William Calhoun; Stephen Anderson	Bud'da	3:27
3.	"Gangstas Make the World Go Round"	Jackson; Rolison; Calhoun; Cedric Samson; Thom Bell; Linda Creed	Ice Cube; Cedric Samson (co.)	4:33
4.	"All the Critics in New York"	Jackson; Rolison; Calhoun; Ryan Garner	Binky Mack; Ice Cube (co.)	5:35
5.	"Do You Like Criminals?" (featuring K-Dee)	Jackson; Rolison; Calhoun; Darrell Johnson; S. Anderson	Bud'da	5:01
6.	"Gangstas Don't Dance" (Insert)		Binky Mack	0:22
7.	"The Gangsta, the Killa and the Dope Dealer"	Jackson; Rolison; Calhoun; S. Anderson; Trent Reznor	Bud'da	4:15
8.	"Cross 'Em Out and Put a 'K"	Jackson; Rolison; Calhoun; S. Anderson	Bud'da	4:56
9.	"King of the Hill"	Jackson; Rolison; Quincy Jones III	QDIII	4:17
10.	"3 Time Felons"	Jackson; Rolison; Calhoun; S. Anderson	Bud'da	5:10
11.	"Westward Ho"	Jackson; Rolison; Calhoun; Jones III	QDIII	5:12
12.	"The Pledge" (Insert)			0:14
13.	"Hoo-Bangin' (WSCG Style)" (featuring the Comrads, Allfrumtha I and K-Dee)	Jackson; Rolison; Calhoun; Kelly Garmon; Terrell Anderson; Garner; Marcus Moore; Johnson	Ice Cube	3:58
Total length:				48:12

Sample credits

- Track 3 contains an interpolation of "People Make the World Go Round" written by Thom Bell and Linda Creed
- Track 7 contains a sample from "Hurt" written by Trent Reznor as recorded by Nine Inch Nails
- Track 10 contains an interpolation of "With a Little Help from My Friends" written by Lennon-McCartney

== Personnel ==
- O'Shea "Ice Cube" Jackson – main performer, producer (tracks: 3, 13), co-producer (track 4), engineering, mixing, executive producer
- Dedrick "Mack 10" Rolison – main performer
- William "WC" Calhoun Jr. – main performer
- Kelly "K-Mac" Garmon – featured artist (track 13)
- Terrell "Gangsta" Anderson – featured artist (track 13)
- Ryan "Binky Mack" Garner – featured artist (track 13), producer (track 4)
- Marcus "Squeak Ru" Moore – featured artist (track 13)
- Darrell "K-Dee" Johnson - featured artist (tracks: 5, 13)
- Jonathan Hyde – vocals (track 1)
- Stephen "Bud'da" Anderson – producer (tracks: 2, 5, 7, 8, 10)
- Quincy Delight Jones III – producer (tracks: 9, 11)
- Cedric Samson – co-producer (track 3)
- Keston Wright – engineering
- Art Shoji – art direction, design
- Manuel J. Donayre – art direction, design
- Michael Miller – photography
- Steven Wills – logo artwork
- Marvin Watkins – A&R

== Charts ==
=== Weekly charts ===
Chart (1996)	Peak position
UK R&B Albums (OCC)	22
US Billboard 200	2
US Top R&B/Hip-Hop Albums (Billboard)	1

=== Year-end charts ===
Chart (1996)	Position
US Billboard 200	171
US Top R&B/Hip-Hop Albums (Billboard)	48

Chart (1997)	Position
US Billboard 200	64
US Top R&B/Hip-Hop Albums (Billboard)	36

== Certifications ==
Region	Certification	Certified units/sales
Canada (Music Canada)	Gold	50,000^{^}
United States (RIAA)	Platinum	1,000,000^{^}
^{^} Shipments figures based on certification alone.

== See also ==
- List of Billboard number-one R&B albums of 1996
