= Curb Servin' =

Studio album by WC and the Maad Circle
- Released: October 3, 1995
- Recorded: 1994–1995
- Studios: Encore (Los Angeles, CA); Echo (Los Angeles, CA)
- Genres: West Coast hip-hop; hardcore hip-hop; gangsta rap
- Length: 49:50
- Labels: PayDay; FFRR; London
- Producers: DJ Crazy Toones; Dr. Jam; Ice Cube; Madness 4 Real; Rhythm D

WC and the Maad Circle chronology
| Ain't a Damn Thang Changed (1991) | Curb Servin' (1995) |

Singles from Curb Servin'
- 1. "West Up!" Released: August 14, 1995; 2. "The One" Released: March 26, 1996

Curb Servin' is the second and final studio album by American West Coast hip-hop group WC and the Maad Circle. It was released on October 3, 1995, via PayDay/FFRR/London Records. The recording sessions took place at Encore Recording Studios and Echo Sound Studios in Los Angeles. The album was produced by DJ Crazy Toones, Dr. Jam, Madness 4 Real, Ice Cube, and Rhythm D.

In the United States, the album debuted at number 85 on the Billboard 200 and number 15 on the Top R&B/Hip-Hop Albums charts. It spawned two singles: "West Up!" and "The One". Its lead single, "West Up!", peaked at number 88 on the Billboard Hot 100, number 50 on the Hot R&B/Hip-Hop Songs, number 16 on the Hot Rap Songs. The second and final single off of the album, "The One", made it to number 76 on the Hot R&B/Hip-Hop Songs and number 40 on the Hot Rap Songs.

Former member Coolio, who had embarked on a successful solo career, appeared on one track. The group disbanded the following year. WC joined fellow West Coast rappers Ice Cube and Mack 10 eventually forming supergroup Westside Connection, before embarking solo career as well. DJ Crazy Toones got signed with Lench Mob Records as record producer and touring deejay, before dying on January 9, 2017.

== Critical reception ==
Professional ratings
Review scores
| Source | Rating |
|---|---|
| AllMusic | 3/5 stars |
| Muzik | 4/5 stars |

Neil Strauss of Trouser Press compared the album to those of former member Coolio, writing that the combination of classic samples and hard rhymes made for an "unwieldy" and "uninventive" record.

== Track listing ==
| No. | Title | Writer(s) | Producer(s) | Length |
|---|---|---|---|---|
| 1. | "Intro" | William Calhoun Jr.; Lamar Calhoun; George Clinton Jr.; Garry Shider; David Spradley | Crazy Toones | 1:38 |
| 2. | "West Up!" | Calhoun Jr.; O'Shea Jackson; Dedrick Rolison; Calhoun; George Duke; Byron Miller; Leon Chancler | Crazy Toones | 4:44 |
| 3. | "Granny Nuttin' Up" | | Crazy Toones | 0:22 |
| 4. | "The One" | Calhoun Jr.; Calhoun; Allen Toussaint | Crazy Toones | 3:52 |
| 5. | "A Crazy Break Pt. 2" | | Crazy Toones | 0:36 |
| 6. | "Put on tha Set" | Calhoun Jr.; Calhoun; Rasmus Berg; Lasse Bavngaard; Nicholas Kvaran; Jesper Dahl; Henrik Rasmussen | Madness 4 Real; Dr. Jam | 3:59 |
| 7. | "In a Twist" | Calhoun Jr.; Artis Ivey; Calhoun; Clinton Jr.; Bernie Worrell; William Collins | Crazy Toones | 4:19 |
| 8. | "Homesick" | Calhoun Jr.; Calhoun; Jackson; Clinton Jr.; Collins | Ice Cube | 4:29 |
| 9. | "Feel Me" | Calhoun Jr.; Calhoun; Berg; Bavngaard; Kvaran; Dahl; Rasmussen | Madness 4 Real; Dr. Jam | 4:25 |
| 10. | "Curb Servin'" | Calhoun Jr.; Calhoun; Jackson; Adrian Belew; Chris Frantz; Steven Stanley; Tina Weymouth; Clinton Jr.; Worrell; Collins | Crazy Toones; Ice Cube | 4:17 |
| 11. | "Stuckie Mack" | | Crazy Toones | 0:33 |
| 12. | "Wet Dream" | Calhoun Jr.; Calhoun; T. Rabb | Crazy Toones | 2:55 |
| 13. | "Taking Ova" | Calhoun Jr.; Calhoun; Berg; Bavngaard; Kvaran; Dahl; Rasmussen | Madness 4 Real; Dr. Jam | 3:39 |
| 14. | "Kill a Habit" | Calhoun Jr.; Calhoun; John Watson | Crazy Toones | 4:01 |
| 15. | "Reality Check" | | Crazy Toones | 0:49 |
| 16. | "The Creator" | Calhoun Jr.; Calhoun; David Weldon; Howard Hewett; Dana Meyers | Rhythm D. | 5:12 |
| Total length: | | | | 49:50 |

Sample credits

- Track 1 contains a sample from "Atomic Dog" written by George Clinton, Garry Shider and David Spradley as recorded by George Clinton.
- Track 2 contains a sample from "Reach for It" written by George Duke, Byron Miller, Leon Chancler and Charles Foster Johnson as recorded by George Duke.
- Track 4 contains a sample from "Girl Callin'" written by Allen Toussaint as recorded by Chocolate Milk.
- Track 7 contains a sample from "Aqua Boogie (A Psychoalphadiscobetabioaquadoloop)" written by George Clinton, Bernie Worrell and William Collins as recorded by Parliament.
- Track 8 contains an interpolation of "Can't Stay Away" written by George Clinton and William Collins.
- Track 9 contains a sample from "I Wanna Know Do You Feel It" written by Marvin Pierce, Gregory Webster, Bruce Napier, Ralph Middlebrooks, Leroy Bonner, Marshall Jones, Andrew Noland and Walter Morrison as recorded by the Ohio Players.
- Track 10 contains a sample from "Dr. Funkenstein" written by George Clinton, Bernie Worrell and William Collins as recorded by Parliament and "Genius of Love" written by Adrian Belew, Chris Frantz, Steven Stanley and Tina Weymouth as recorded by Tom Tom Club.
- Track 14 contains a sample from "Telephone Bill" written by John Watson Jr. as recorded by Johnny "Guitar" Watson.
- Track 16 contains an interpolation of "This Is for the Lover in You" written by Howard Hewett and Dana Meyers.

== Charts ==
| Chart (1995) | Peak position |
|---|---|
| US Billboard 200 | 85 |
| US Top R&B/Hip-Hop Albums (Billboard) | 15 |
