= Guilty by Affiliation =

Studio album by WC
- Released: August 14, 2007
- Recorded: 2006–07
- Studio: Lench Mob Studios (Los Angeles, CA)
- Genre: West Coast hip hop; gangsta rap
- Length: 52:18
- Label: Lench Mob
- Producer: Ice Cube (also exec.); D-Mac; Emile; Hallway Productionz; Jellyroll; Laylaw; Mr. Porter; Nottz; Rick Rock; The Legendary Traxster

WC chronology
Terrorist Threats (2003)	Guilty by Affiliation (2007)	Revenge of the Barracuda (2011)

Professional ratings
Review scores
Source	Rating
RapReviews	8.5/10

Guilty by Affiliation is the third-solo studio album by American rapper WC. It was released on August 14, 2007 via Lench Mob Records. Production was handled by Hallway Productionz, Emile, D-Mac, Jelly Roll, Laylaw, Mr. Porter, Nottz, Rick Rock, The Legendary Traxster, and Ice Cube, who served as co-producer and executive producer. It features guest appearances from Ice Cube, Butch Cassidy, Snoop Dogg and The Game. The album peaked at number 49 on the Billboard 200, at number six on the Top R&B/Hip-Hop Albums and at number five on the Top Rap Albums in the United States. The song "This Is Los Angeles" was used in David Ayer's 2008 film Street Kings.

== Track listing ==
No.	Title	Writer(s)	Producer(s)	Length
1.	"This Is Los Angeles" (featuring Ice Cube)	William Calhoun; O'Shea Jackson; David Drew	Jelly Roll; Ice Cube (co.)	3:05
2.	"West Coast Voodoo" (featuring The Game)	Calhoun; Jayceon Taylor; Deejan Underdue; Teak Underdue; Jackson	Hallway Productionz; Ice Cube (co.)	3:23
3.	"Jack and the Bean Stalk"	Calhoun; Dominick Lamb; Jackson	Nottz; Ice Cube (co.)	4:44
4.	"Paranoid" (featuring Ice Cube)	Calhoun; Jackson; Denaun Porter	Kon Artis; Ice Cube (co.)	4:10
5.	"Guilty by Affiliation" (featuring Ice Cube)	Calhoun; Jackson; D. Underdue; T. Underdue	Hallway Productionz; Ice Cube (co.)	4:08
6.	"Dodgeball" (featuring Snoop Dogg and Butch Cassidy)	Calhoun; Calvin Broadus; Danny Means; Emile Haynie; Jackson	Emile; Chris Rob (co.); Ice Cube (co.)	4:23
7.	"Keep It 100" (featuring Ice Cube)	Calhoun; Jackson; Larry Goodman; Derrick McDowell	Laylaw; D-Mac; Ice Cube (co.)	4:17
8.	"Crazy Toones 4 President"	Calhoun; D. Underdue; T. Underdue; Jackson	Hallway Productionz; Ice Cube (co.)	2:22
9.	"If You See a Bad Bitch" (featuring Ice Cube)	Calhoun; Jackson; D. Underdue; T. Underdue	Hallway Productionz; Ice Cube (co.)	3:47
10.	"Look at Me" (featuring Ice Cube)	Calhoun; Jackson; Ricardo Thomas	Rick Rock; Ice Cube (co.)	3:28
11.	"Side Dick"	Calhoun; Samuel Lindley	The Legendary Traxster	3:27
12.	"80's Babies" (featuring Ice Cube)	Calhoun; Jackson; D. Underdue; T. Underdue	Hallway Productionz; Ice Cube (co.)	3:38
13.	"Gang Injunctions"	Calhoun; Haynie; Jackson	Emile; Ice Cube (co.)	2:57
14.	"Addicted to It" (featuring Ice Cube)	Calhoun; Jackson; D. Underdue; T. Underdue	Hallway Productionz; Ice Cube (co.)	4:29
Total length:				52:18

== Charts ==
Chart (2007)	Peak position
US Billboard 200	49
US Top R&B/Hip-Hop Albums (Billboard)	6
US Top Rap Albums (Billboard)	5
