= Westside Connection =

American hip hop supergroup

- From left to right: WC, Ice Cube, Mack 10 in 2003

Background information
- Origin: Los Angeles, California, U.S.
- Genres: West Coast hip-hop; gangsta rap; G-funk
- Years active: 1995–2005
- Labels: Lench Mob; Priority; Hoo-Bangin'; Capitol
- Past members: Ice Cube; Mack 10; WC

Westside Connection was an American hip-hop supergroup formed by Ice Cube, Mack 10, and WC. The group's debut album, Bow Down, reached the number two position on the Billboard 200 in 1996 and was certified platinum that same year.

== History ==
Westside Connection began performing together in 1995, appearing on Mack 10's self-titled debut album, Mack 10, on the track "Westside Slaughterhouse". A few months later, the group reunited on WC's album, Curb Servin', with the song "West Up!". Around this time, they began working on their debut album, Bow Down, which was released on October 22, 1996.

Individually, Mack 10, WC, and Ice Cube continued to work on solo projects between group albums. As Westside Connection, they contributed several tracks to film soundtracks and compilations, including "Bangin'" (from West Coast Bad Boyz II), "Let It Reign" (from Thicker than Water), and "It's the Holidaze" (from Friday After Next).

On December 9, 2003, the group released their second album, Terrorist Threats, led by the single "Gangsta Nation", produced by Fredwreck and featuring Nate Dogg.

Mack 10 left the group in 2005 following a dispute with Ice Cube, leading to Westside Connection's disbandment. Despite the breakup, Ice Cube and WC continued collaborating, frequently appearing on each other's albums.

In 2008, HipHopDX reported that Ice Cube and WC were considering reviving the Westside Connection project, with The Game proposed as Mack 10's replacement. This plan followed The Game's appearance with WC on Ice Cube's album Raw Footage that same year. However, the rumored revival never materialized.

In a 2020 interview with VladTV, Mack 10 reflected that any reunion without his involvement would still require compensation, as he owns the trademark on the group's name. This ownership stems from their second album being released through his record label.

In 2023, Ice Cube dismissed the possibility of a reunion, citing unresolved issues with Mack 10. He described their conflict as "a violation that can't be overlooked."

== Discography ==
=== Studio albums ===
Title	Album details	Peak chart positions				Certifications
Title	Album details	US	US R&B	AUS	CAN	Certifications
Bow Down	Released: October 22, 1996; Label: Lench Mob, Priority; Format: CD, LP, cassette, digital download	2	1	—	45	RIAA: Platinum; MC: Gold
Terrorist Threats	Released: December 9, 2003; Label: Hoo-Bangin', Capitol; Format: CD, digital download	16	3	62	40	RIAA: Gold; MC: Gold

=== Compilation albums ===
Title	Album details
The Best of Westside Connection: The Gangsta, The Killa & The Dope Dealer	Released: November 30, 2007; Label: Priority; Format: CD, digital download

=== Singles ===
==== As lead artist ====
List of singles as lead artist, with selected chart positions, showing year released and album name
Title	Year	Peak chart positions				Album
Title	Year	US	US R&B	US Rap	AUS	Album
"Bow Down"	1996	21	19	1	—	Bow Down
"Gangstas Make the World Go Round"	1996	40	30	10	—	Bow Down
"It's the Holidaze"	2002	—	—	—	—	Friday After Next soundtrack
"Gangsta Nation"	2003	33	22	9	66	Terrorist Threats
"Concrete"	2022	—	—	—	—	Non-album single
"—" denotes a recording that did not chart.

==== As featured artist ====
List of singles as featured artist, with other performing artists and selected chart positions, showing year released and album name
Title	Year	Peak chart positions			Album
Title	Year	US	US R&B	US Rap	Album
"Irresistible" (Mariah Carey featuring Westside Connection)	2002	-	81	-	Charmbracelet

===== Promotional singles =====
List of promotional singles as featured artist, with other performing artists, showing year released and album name
Title	Year	Album
"Whatcha Gonna Do (Remix)" (Jayo Felony featuring Redman, Mack 10 and WC)	1998	Non-album single

=== Guest appearances ===
List of non-single guest appearances, with all performing artists, showing year released and album name
Title	Year	Other Performer(s)	Group performers	Album
"Bangin'"	1997	Master P	Ice Cube, Mack 10, WC	West Coast Bad Boyz II
"Westside Connect OG's"	1997	The Comrads, Allfrumtha I	Ice Cube, Mack 10, WC	The Comrads
"Maniac in the Brainiac"	1998	None	Ice Cube, Mack 10	Bulworth soundtrack
"Dopest on da Planet"	1998	Squeak Ru	Ice Cube, Mack 10	Allfrumtha I
"My Hoodlums & My Thugz"	1998	E-40	Mack 10, WC	The Element of Surprise
"Freestyle"	1998	Funkmaster Flex	Ice Cube, Mack 10	The Mix Tape, Vol. 3: 60 Minutes of Funk (The Final Chapter)
"Murderfest '99"	1999	Road Dawgs, MC Eiht, Boo Kapone, Boobie	Ice Cube, Mack 10	Don't Be Saprize
"You Ain't Know"	1999	Road Dawgs, Young Pretty, Q.S. Bandit	Ice Cube, Mack 10	Don't Be Saprize
"III tha Hood Way"	1999	MC Eiht	Ice Cube, Mack 10	Section 8
"Callin' All Hogs"	2000	Boo Kapone	Mack 10, WC	None
"Terrorist Threath"	2003	None	Ice Cube, Mack 10, WC	True Crime: Streets of LA soundtrack, Terrorist Threats
