= WC and the Maad Circle =

American hip hop group

- WC (middle), Big Gee (left) and DJ Crazy Toones (right)

Background information
- Origin: Los Angeles, California, U.S.
- Genres: West Coast hip-hop; political rap; G-funk
- Years active: 1990–1995
- Labels: Priority; Payday
- Past members: WC; Coolio (deceased); Big Gee; DJ Crazy Toones (deceased)

WC and the Maad Circle was an American hip hop group from Los Angeles, California that consisted of WC, Big Gee, Coolio and DJ Crazy Toones.

== History ==
Following the dissolution of Low Profile, the rapper WC formed the group and released the albums Ain't a Damn Thang Changed in 1991 and Curb Servin' in 1995. The albums spawned some popular singles, notably "Dress Code", "West Up!" and "The One".

WC would later leave the group and form the gangsta rap supergroup Westside Connection with Ice Cube and Mack 10. WC and Crazy Toones continued working together at Ice Cube's Lench Mob Records.

On January 9, 2017, Crazy Toones died at age 45 of a heart attack.

On September 28, 2022, Coolio was found unresponsive on a friend's bathroom floor and died of an apparent heart attack, later confirmed to be from an accidental overdose of fentanyl, heroin, and methamphetamine.

== Discography ==
=== Studio albums ===
Title	Release	Peak chart positions		
Title	Release	US	US R&B	US Heat
Ain't a Damn Thang Changed	1991	—	52	29
Curb Servin'	1995	85	15	—

=== Singles ===
Title	Release	Peak chart positions			Album
Title	Release	US	US Rap	US R&B	Album
"Dress Code"	1991	—	—	—	Ain't a Damn Thang Changed
"West Up!" (featuring Mack 10 and Ice Cube)	1995	88	16	50	Curb Servin'
"The One"	1996	—	40	76	Curb Servin'
"—" denotes a recording that did not chart.
