= WC (rapper) =

American rapper (born 1970)

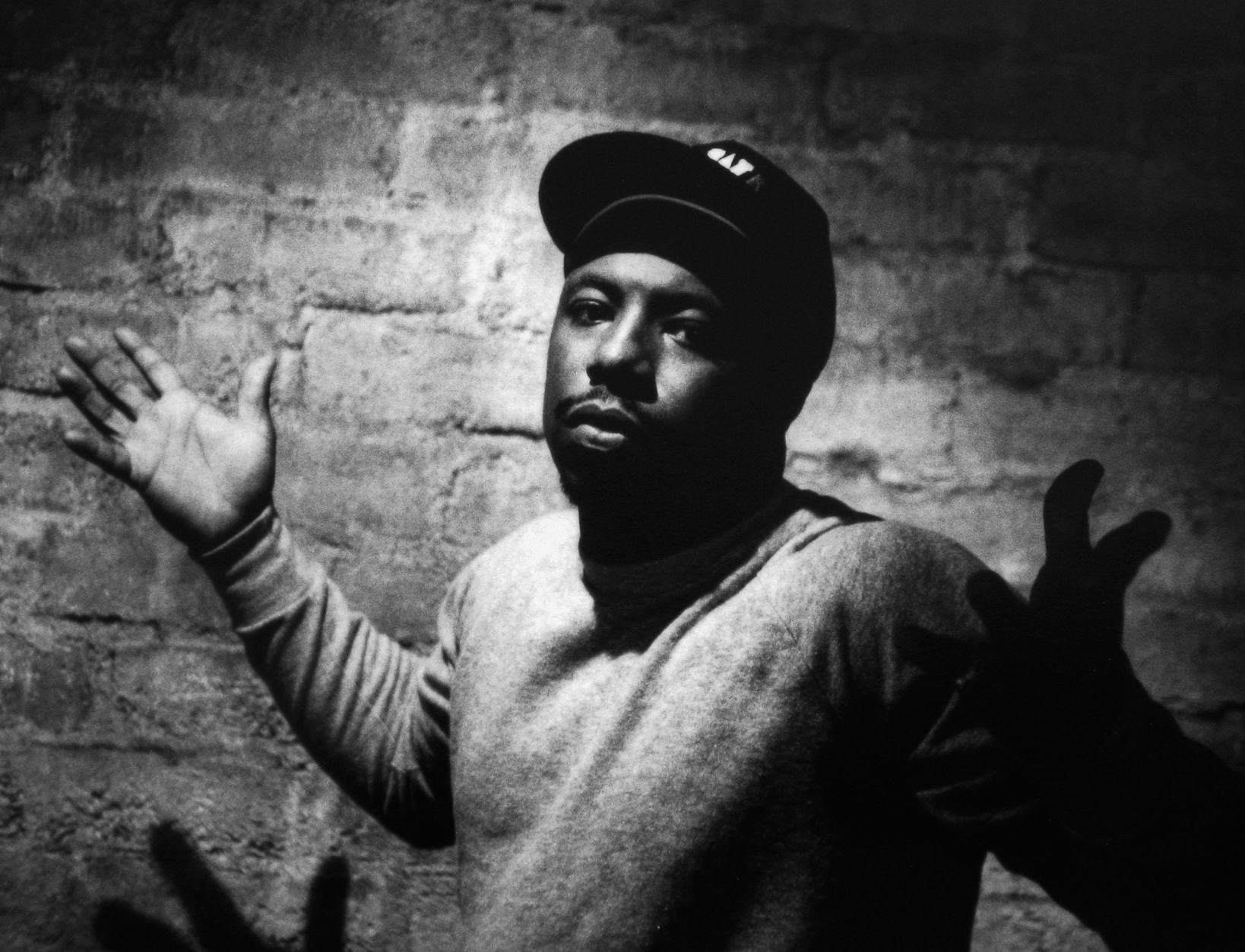
- WC in 1989

Background information
- Born: William Lashawn Calhoun Jr. February 3, 1970 (age 56); Houston, Texas, U.S.
- Origin: Los Angeles, California, U.S.
- Genres: West Coast hip-hop; gangsta rap; G-funk
- Occupations: Rapper; actor
- Works: WC discography
- Years active: 1987–present
- Labels: Payday; London; Def Jam; Lench Mob; MNRK; Priority
- Formerly of: Low Profile; WC and the Maad Circle; Westside Connection

William LaShawn Calhoun Jr. (born February 3, 1970), known professionally as WC (pronounced "dub-c"), is an American rapper and actor. He originally was a rapper of the group Low Profile and later formed his group WC and the Maad Circle, who first succeeded with the single "Ain't A Damn Thang Changed". He later started a solo career and has released four solo albums. He is also well known for being a member of the rap supergroup Westside Connection with fellow West Coast rappers Ice Cube and Mack 10.

== Personal life ==
William Calhoun, Jr., was born in Houston on February 3, 1970, and grew up in South Los Angeles. He is the older brother of DJ Crazy Toones. He served as a Los Angeles dialect coach for actor Damson Idris on the FX show Snowfall.

== Music career ==
=== Low Profile & WC and the Maad Circle ===
A longtime staple of the West Coast music scene, WC began his career pairing with DJ Aladdin in the group Low Profile in 1987. The group released one album called We're in This Together in 1989. He later formed WC and the Maad Circle, which included Big Gee, Coolio and DJ Crazy Toones. The group released two albums, Ain't a Damn Thang Changed in 1991 and Curb Servin' in 1995.

=== Solo career ===
WC's solo debut, The Shadiest One, followed in 1998, landing in the pop Top 20 in its first week of release. "Just Clownin'" and "Better Days" were moderate hits, and his second record, 2002's Ghetto Heisman, entered the pop charts as well. In 2007, he released his third solo album, Guilty by Affiliation on Lench Mob Records. Ice Cube, Snoop Dogg, and The Game all made an appearance on the album. He released his fourth solo album, Revenge of the Barracuda, on March 8, 2011. The album featured guests like Ice Cube, Young Maylay, Daz Dillinger, and Kokane.

=== Westside Connection ===
In 1996, WC formed Westside Connection with Ice Cube and Mack 10. The group's debut album, Bow Down, was released in 1996. The album reached the number 2 position on the Billboard 200 and was certified Platinum in 1996. "Bow Down", the single, reached number 21 on the Billboard Hot 100. The group released their second album, Terrorist Threats, in 2003, featuring the lead single "Gangsta Nation", which was produced by Fredwreck and featured Nate Dogg. In 2005, the group disbanded.

== Discography ==
Studio albums

- The Shadiest One (1998)
- Ghetto Heisman (2002)
- Guilty by Affiliation (2007)
- Revenge of the Barracuda (2011)

Collaborative albums

- We're in This Together (with Low Profile) (1989)
- Ain't a Damn Thang Changed (with WC and the Maad Circle) (1991)
- Curb Servin' (with WC and the Maad Circle) (1995)
- Bow Down (with Westside Connection) (1996)
- Terrorist Threats (with Westside Connection) (2003)
- West Coast Gangsta Shit (with Daz Dillinger) (2013)

== Filmography ==
- 1989: Wiseguy
- 1995: Friday
- 1996: Set It Off as Darnell
- 1997: The Jamie Foxx Show (with Westside Connection)
- 1998: Sister, Sister
- 1998: Da Game of Life
- 1999: The Breaks
- 1999: Thicker than Water as Trip
- 1999: Foolish
- 2000: Moesha
- 2001: Air Rage
- 2002: Stranded
- 2002: White Boy
- 2003: WC: Bandana Swangin – All That Glitters Ain't Gold
- 2006: It Ain't Easy
- 2008: Belly 2: Millionaire Boyz Club
- 2012: Something from Nothing: The Art of Rap
- 2015: The Street
- 2018: Snowfall as Dub C
