= Mack 10 discography =

- Studio albums: 8
- Soundtrack albums: 2
- Compilation albums: 2
- Singles: 22
- Music videos: 15
- Collaborations: 3

The discography of West Coast hip hop artist Mack 10 consists of eight studio albums, two compilation albums, twenty-two singles, and fifteen music videos. He has also collaborated on two albums and was featured in two soundtrack albums. After signing to Priority Records in 1995, Mack 10 released his self-titled debut album in June. The album, produced by fellow rapper Ice Cube, saw considerable commercial success and went Gold in the US. His prosperity continued when he released Based on a True Story, which peaked at number fourteen on the US Billboard 200. The rapper collaborated with Tha Dogg Pound to record "Nothin' But the Cavi Hit" which was released on the Rhyme & Reason soundtrack. Mack 10's 1998 release, The Recipe, was the rapper's third and final album to be certified Gold in the US by RIAA. Mack 10's album sales began to decline after his first compilation album release, Hoo-Bangin': The Mix Tape, Vol. 1. His fourth studio album, The Paper Route (2000), debuted at number nineteen on the Billboard 200; however, it failed to earn the rapper any RIAA certifications.

Mack 10 left Priority Records after The Paper Route, and his next album, Bang or Ball (2001), was released through Cash Money and Universal Records. His album sales continued to decelerate with his 2003 album, Ghetto, Gutter & Gangsta, which was released through Bungalo Records. In 2005, he released Hustla's Handbook under Capitol Records. The album did significantly better than his previous, peaking at number sixty-five on the Billboard 200—forty places above Ghetto, Gutter & Gangsta. His most recent solo album, Soft White (2009), was released through Fontana Distribution and at number 141, it is his lowest charting album on the Billboard 200.

== Albums ==
=== Studio albums ===
Year	Album details	Peak chart positions					Certifications
Year	Album details	US	US R&B/HH	US Heat.	US Ind.	US Rap	Certifications
1995	Mack 10: Released: June 20, 1995; Label: Priority; Format: CD, LP, cassette, digital download	33	2	12	—	—	RIAA: Gold
1997	Based on a True Story: Released: September 16, 1997; Label: Priority; Format: CD, LP, cassette, digital download	14	5	—	—	—	RIAA: Gold
1998	The Recipe: Released: October 6, 1998; Label: Hoo-Bangin', Priority; Format: CD, LP, cassette, digital download	15	6	—	—	—	RIAA: Gold
2000	The Paper Route: Released: September 5, 2000; Label: Hoo-Bangin', Priority; Format: CD, LP, cassette, digital download	19	4	—	—	—	
2001	Bang or Ball: Released: December 4, 2001; Label: Cash Money, Universal; Format: CD, LP, cassette, digital download	48	4	—	—	—	
2003	Ghetto, Gutter & Gangsta: Released: July 22, 2003; Label: Hoo-Bangin', Bungalo; Format: CD, digital download	105	28	—	—	—	
2005	Hustla's Handbook: Released: September 27, 2005; Label: Hoo-Bangin', Capitol; Format: CD, LP, digital download	65	13	—	—	9	
2009	Soft White: Released: September 29, 2009; Label: Hoo-Bangin', Fontana; Format: CD, digital download	141	14	—	21	5	
"—" denotes a recording that did not chart or was not released in that territory.

=== Collaborative albums ===
Year	Album details	Chart positions		
Year	Album details	US	U.S. R&B/HH	US Ind.
1997	In tha Beginning...There Was Rap: Collaboration with various artists; Released: November 25, 1997; Label: Priority; Format: CD, LP, cassette, digital download	—	—	—
2002	Mack 10 Presents da Hood: Collaboration with Da Hood; Released: July 23, 2002; Label: D3, Riviera; Format: CD, digital download	40	9	2
2011	Money Music: Collaboration with Glasses Malone; Released: April 12, 2011; Label: Hoo-Bangin'; Format: CD, digital download	—	—	—
"—" denotes a recording that did not chart or was not released in that territory.

=== Compilation albums ===
Year	Album details	Chart positions
Year	Album details	U.S. R&B/HH
1999	Hoo-Bangin': The Mix Tape, Vol. 1: Released: August 24, 1999; Label: Hoo-Bangin', Priority; Format: CD, cassette	87
2007	Foe Life: The Best of Mack 10: Released: December 4, 2007; Label: Priority; Format: CD	—
"—" denotes a recording that did not chart or was not released in that territory.

=== Soundtrack albums ===
Year	Album details	Chart positions		
Year	Album details	US	U.S. R&B/HH	U.S. Sound.
1997	Rhyme & Reason: Released: January 14, 1997; Label: Priority; Format: CD, LP, cassette	16	1	—
1999	Thicker than Water: Released: October 5, 1999; Label: Hoo-Bangin', Priority; Format: CD, LP, cassette	64	8	14
"—" denotes a recording that did not chart or was not released in that territory.

== Singles ==
Year	Song	Chart position					Album
Year	Song	US	US R&B/HH Songs	US R&B/HH Air	US Rhythm	US Dance	Album
1995	"Foe Life" (featuring Ice Cube)	71	42	54	—	42	Mack 10
1995	"On Them Thangs" (featuring the Mary Jane Girls)	105	74	—	—	—	Mack 10
1995	"Westside Slaughterhouse"	—	—	—	—	—	Mack 10
1996	"Hoo Bangin'" (with Ice Cube)	—	—	—	—	—	The Substitute (soundtrack)
1996	"Nothin' But the Cavi Hit" (with Tha Dogg Pound)	38	24	62	—	9	Rhyme & Reason (soundtrack)
1997	"Backyard Boogie"	37	23	45	23	—	Based on a True Story
1997	"Only in California" (featuring Ice Cube and Snoop Dogg)	—	—	52	37	—	Based on a True Story
1998	"Let the Games Begin" (featuring Fat Joe and Big Punisher)	—	—	—	—	—	The Recipe
1998	"Money's Just a Touch Away" (featuring Gerald Levert)	54	31	71	—	—	The Recipe
2000	"From tha Streetz"	—	78	74	—	—	The Paper Route
2000	"Tight to Def" (featuring T-Boz)	—	65	55	—	—	The Paper Route
2001	"Do tha Damn Thing"	—	—	—	—	—	Bang or Ball
2001	"Hate in Yo Eyes"	—	98	—	—	—	Bang or Ball
2002	"Connected for Life"	—	57	56	—	—	Bang or Ball
2003	"Lights Out"	—	61	—	—	—	Ghetto, Gutter & Gangsta
2005	"Like This" (featuring Nate Dogg)	—	—	—	—	—	Hustla's Handbook
2005	"The Testimony"	—	—	—	28	—	Hustla's Handbook
2008	"Big Balla" (featuring Glasses Malone & Red Cafe/Birdman)	—	—	—	—	—	Soft White
2009	"So Sharp" (featuring Jazze Pha, Lil Wayne & Rick Ross)	—	80	—	—	—	Soft White
"—" denotes a recording that did not chart or was not released in that territory.

== Guest appearances ==
Year	Title	Artist	Album
1994	"What Can I Do" (Westside Remix)	Ice Cube	Non-album single
1994	"Cut Throats" (Priority Records)	Da Lench Mob	Planet of da Apes
1995	"West Up!"	WC and the Madd Circle, Ice Cube	Curb Servin'
1995	"Take a Hit"	—N/a	Friday (soundtrack)
1997	"Get Your Bang On"	Comrads	The Comrads
1997	"Can't Stop"	Ant Banks, E-40	Big Thangs
1997	"Get Yo Bang On"	—N/a	Gang Related – The Soundtrack
1997	"Fetty Chico and the Mack"	Spice 1	The Black Bossalini
1998	"Ghetto Fabulous"	Ras Kass, Dr. Dre	Rasassination
1998	"Yeah 'Em, Yeah 'Em"	Pras	Ghetto Supastar
1998	"Maniac in the Brainiac"	Ice Cube	Bulworth (soundtrack)
1998	"The Curse of Money"	Ice Cube	War & Peace Vol. 1 (The War Disc)
1998	"Freestyle over 'MGM'"	Funkmaster Flex, Ice Cube	The Mix Tape, Vol. III
1998	"My Hoodlumz & My Thugs"	E-40, WC	The Element of Surprise
1998	"Finna Shit on Em"	Jayo Felony	Whatcha Gonna Do
1998	"It's Goin Down" (remix)	Celly Cel, E-40, Rappin' 4-Tay, B-Legit	The G Filez
1998	"Get Your Bang ON"	Allfrumtha I	Allfrumtha I
1998	"Make You Dance"	Allfrumtha I, Soutre	Allfrumtha I
1998	"Dopest on the Planet"	Allfrumtha I, Ice Cube	Allfrumtha I
1999	"III tha Hood Way"	MC Eiht, Ice Cube	Section 8
1999	"I Want It All"	Warren G	I Want It All
1999	"Gang Bang"	Road Dawgs, Squeak Ru	Thicker than Water (soundtrack)
1999	"Who Got Some Gangsta"	Bad Azz, CJ Mac, Binky, Road Dawgs	Thicker than Water (soundtrack)
1999	"Gngsta Gangsta"	—N/a	Thicker than Water (soundtrack)
1999	"Hoo Bangin' C.O.G. Style"	Chilldrin of da Ghetto, MC Eiht	Chilldrin of da Ghetto
1999	"You Ain't Know"	Road Dawgs, Ice Cube, Young Pretty	Don't Be Saprize
1999	"Senorita"	The Delinquents, Yukmouth	Bosses Will Be Bosses
1999	"Good Friday"	Big Tymers, Lil Wayne	Next Friday (soundtrack)
2000	"You Can Do It"	Ice Cube	Next Friday (soundtrack)/War & Peace Vol. 2 (The Peace Disc)
2000	"Thugz"	—N/a	Romeo Must Die (soundtrack)
2000	"Where My Gangsta's At"	B-Legit, Kurupt	Hempin' Ain't Easy
2000	"Nigga Shit"	E-40, The Click, Levitti	Loyalty and Betrayal
2000	"Milk & Honey"	Cash Money Millionaires	Baller Blcokin' (soundtrack)
2000	"Shine"	Lil' Wayne	Lights Out
2001	"Steady Grinding"	Juvenile, Lil Wanye, Turk, Birdman	Exit Wounds (soundtrack)
2001	"Yes We Do"	Turk, Lil' Wayne, B.G.	Young & Thuggin'
2001	"Pay Day"	Big Syke, Krayzie Bone, Young Noble	Thug Law: Thug Life Outlawz Chapter 1
2002	"Stack Bangin"	Shade Sheist	Informal Introduction
2002	"Get Yours"	MC Eiht	Underground Hero
2002	"Walk"	WC, Ice Cube	Ghetto Heisman
2003	"Bang On"	Boo-Yaa T.R.I.B.E.	West Koasta Nostra
2005	"Nobody Move"	Insane Clown Posse	Forgotten Freshness Volume 4
2005	"Balla"	—N/a	Coach Carter (soundtrack)
2005	"A Few Good Men"	T-Bone	Bone-A-Fide
2007	"Dope Man" (remix)	N.W.A	Straight Outta Compton: 20th Anniversary Edition
2009	"Infliltration"	J. Wells	Digital Master
2009	"Off Safety"	Glasses Malone	Beach Cruiser
2009	"Chickn Talkn"	Triple C's	Custom Cars & Cycles
2014	"Bicken Back Being Bool" (Remix)	YG, Big Wy, DJ Quik	Blame It on the Streets
2014	Sellin' Dope Ain't Fun	E-40	Sharp on All 4 Corners: Corner 2
2014	"The Conduct"	DJ Quik	The Midnight Life
2018	"Wolf Life"	Red Cafe, Vince Tega	Less Talk, More Hustle
2019	"Wanna Be a Gangsta"	The Norf	Nothing Over Real Family

== Music videos ==
Year	Song	Director(s)
1995	"Foe Life"	Ice Cube, John Simmons
1995	"On Them Thangs"	John Simmons
1995	"Westside Slaughterhouse"	—
1997	"Backyard Boogie"	Thomas Ferguson
1997	"Only in California"	Paul Hunter
1998	"Let The Games Begin"	K.C. Amos
1998	"Money's Just a Touch Away"	Christopher Erskin
1999	"Nothin' But the Cavi Hit"	Vincent E. Toto
2000	"From da Streetz"	Dave Meyers
2000	"Tight To Def"	Dave Meyers
2000	"Thugz"	n/a
2001	"Do tha Damn Thang"	Bille Woodruff
2001	"Hate in Yo Eyes"	Matthew Libatique
2002	"Connected for Life"	Bille Woodruff
2003	"Lights Out"	—
2005	"Like This"	Benny Boom
2008	"Big Balla"	—
2009	"So Sharp"	K.C. Amos
2009	"Mirror, Mirror"	K.C. Amos
2010	"Hood Famous"	—
2011	"Winning"	K.C. Amos
2011	"Extra Extra"	—
2011	"Dear D.E.A."	Chia-Yu Chen
"—" denotes an unknown director due to lack of reliable sources.

== See also ==
- Westside Connection discography
