= Platinum Game =

Studio album by CJ Mac
- Released: August 31, 1999
- Genres: West Coast hip hop; gangsta rap
- Length: 44:21
- Labels: Hoo-Bangin'; Priority
- Producers: Mack 10 (exec.); Ant Banks; DJ Battlecat; DJ Crazy Toones; Johnny "J"; Mad; Young Tre

CJ Mac chronology
| True Game (1995) | Platinum Game (1999) |

Singles from Platinum Game
- 1. "Imagine That" Released: 1999

Professional ratings
Review scores
| Source | Rating |
|---|---|
| AllMusic | 2.5/5 stars |
| The Source | 3/5 stars |

Platinum Game is the second studio album by American rapper CJ Mac. It was released on August 31, 1999, through Hoo-Bangin'/Priority Records. Production was handled by Young Trey, Mad, DJ Crazy Toones, Ant Banks, DJ Battlecat and Johnny "J", with Mack 10 serving as executive producer. It features guest appearances from WC, Big Pimpin' Delemond, Fat Joe, Finale, Soultre, Too Short, TQ, La' Reece and Barbara Wilson. The album peaked at number 77 on the Billboard Top R&B/Hip-Hop Albums and at number 42 on the Billboard Heatseekers Albums.

Along with a single, a music video was released for the song "Imagine That" and has a cameo appearance by MC Eiht. The songs "King of L.A." & "Hate" were later used in Richard Cummings Jr.'s 1999 film Thicker than Water, and were also included on the soundtrack.

== Track listing ==
| No. | Title | Producer(s) | Length |
|---|---|---|---|
| 1. | "Hea" (featuring Fat Joe and WC) | Mad | 3:14 |
| 2. | "Imagine That" (featuring TQ) | Young Tre | 3:31 |
| 3. | "Interlude 1" | | 0:35 |
| 4. | "King of L.A." | DJ Crazy Toones | 3:26 |
| 5. | "Gangsta Bitch" (featuring Barbara Wilson) | Johnny "J" | 3:47 |
| 6. | "Hating Game (Interlude)" | | 2:19 |
| 7. | "Hate" (featuring Barbara Wilson) | Young Tre | 4:03 |
| 8. | "Ends" (featuring Finale and WC) | DJ Battlecat | 4:30 |
| 9. | "Gangsta" (featuring Soultre) | Young Tre | 4:03 |
| 10. | "Playa" (featuring La' Reece) | DJ Crazy Toones | 3:37 |
| 11. | "Champagne Dreams" (featuring La' Reece) | Mad | 4:10 |
| 12. | "Interlude 2" | | 1:08 |
| 13. | "Cha Cha" (featuring Too $hort) | Ant Banks | 2:18 |
| 14. | "Big Pimpin'" (featuring Big Pimpin Delemond) | Young Tre | 3:40 |
| Total length: | | | 44:21 |

== Personnel ==
- Bryaan "CJ Mac" Ross – main artist, rap vocals
- William "WC" Calhoun Jr. – featured artist (tracks: 1, 8)
- Joseph "Fat Joe" Cartagena – featured artist (track 1)
- Terrence "TQ" Quaites – featured artist (track 2)
- Barbara Wilson – backing vocals (tracks: 5, 7)
- Derek "Finale" Cooper – featured artist (track 8)
- Soultre – featured artist (track 9)
- Lareece – backing vocals (tracks: 10, 11)
- Todd "Too $hort" Shaw – featured artist (track 13)
- Delemond "Big Pimpin Delemond" Williams – featured artist (track 14)
- Clement "Mad" Burnette – producer (tracks: 1, 11)
- Treyvon "Young Tre" Green – producer (tracks: 2, 7, 9, 14)
- Lamar "DJ Crazy Toones" Calhoun – producer (tracks: 4, 10)
- Johnny Lee Jackson – producer (track 5)
- Kevin "DJ Battlecat" Gilliam – producer (track 8)
- Anthony Banks – producer (track 13)
- Dedrick "Mack 10" Rolison – mixing, executive producer
- Carlos Warlick – mixing
- Brian Gardner – mastering
- Jason Clark – artwork
- Ken Hollis – photography
- David Green – A&R

== Chart history ==
| Chart (1999) | Peak position |
|---|---|
| US Top R&B/Hip-Hop Albums (Billboard) | 77 |
| US Heatseekers Albums (Billboard) | 42 |
