= List of former Priority Records artists =

This is a list of former artists who have recorded for Priority Records.

== 0–9 ==
- 415
- 5th Ward Boyz
- 504 Boyz

== A ==
- Al Kapone
- Anotha Level
- Ant Banks
- Armored Saint

== B ==
- Bad Azz
- Big Ed
- Big L
- Big Mello
- Big Mike
- Big Moe
- Black Moon
- Blac Monks
- Black Star
- Bobby Jimmy & The Critters
- Bongo Logic
- Boot Camp Clik
- Brotha Lynch Hung
- Bushwick Bill

== C ==
- C-Murder
- The California Raisins
- Carole King
- Cheb Mami
- Choclair
- Choice
- Christopher Cross
- Christopher Franke
- CJ Mac
- Cocoa Brovaz
- Company Flow
- The Comrads
- The Conscious Daughters
- Curtis Salgado
- Cutty Ranks
- Cypress Hill

== D ==
- Da Lench Mob
- Dame Grease
- Daz Dillinger
- The Delinquents
- DJ Dara
- DJ Spinna
- DMG
- Dr. Dre

== E ==
- E.S.G.
- Easy Mo Bee
- Eazy-E
- Edward II
- Engines of Aggression
- EPMD

== F ==
- Fates Warning
- Fiend
- Foreigner
- Full Blooded
- Funkadelic

== G ==
- Gambino Family
- Ganksta NIP
- Gary B.B. Coleman
- Ghetto Commission
- Get Low Playaz
- Geto Boys
- Goo Goo Dolls
- Grip Inc.
- Gwar
- Godhead (band)

== H ==
- Heltah Skeltah
- The High & Mighty
- Hi-Tek

== I ==
- Ice Cube
- Ice-T
- The Itals

== J ==
- Jay-Z
- Johnny Clegg & Savuka
- JT The Bigga Figga
- Juluka

== K ==
- Kane & Abel
- Killarmy

== L ==
- Lil Italy
- Lil' Romeo
- Lil Soldiers
- Lil' Zane
- Lil' Toney
- Low Profile

== M ==
- Mac
- Magic
- Magnapop
- Mark May
- Master P
- MC Ren
- The Memphis Horns
- Mercedes
- Mercyful Fate
- Mia X
- Michel'le
- Mo B. Dick
- Mos Def
- Mr. Marcelo
- Mr. Mike
- Mr. Serv-On
- Mack 10
- MC Eiht

== N ==
- N.W.A
- Nice & Smooth
- No Good But So Good

== O ==
- O.G. Style
- Odd Squad
- Organized Konfusion
- Originoo Gunn Clappaz
- Ozzy Osbourne

== P ==
- Paris
- Pauly Shore
- Pharoahe Monch
- Prime Suspects

== R ==
- Ras Kass
- Ray Luv

== S ==
- Sam Kinison
- San Quinn
- Sauce Money
- Sarina Paris
- Scarface
- Seagram
- Silkk The Shocker (Priority/No Limit)
- Shyheim
- Skrew
- Zoran Milanovic
- Skrilla
- Skull Duggery
- Smut Peddlers
- Snoop Dogg (Priority/No Limit)
- Sons of Elvis
- Sons of Funk
- Soulja Slim
- Steady Mobb'n
- Stephen Simmonds
- Svala

== T ==
- Tha Dogg Pound
- Too Much Trouble
- Trinity Garden Cartel
- TRU

== U ==
- U-God

== W ==
- WC and the Maad Circle
- Westside Connection
- Wu-Syndicate
- Wu-Tang Killa Bees

== Y ==
- Y&T
- Young Bleed
