= Wake Up & Ball =

Studio album by The Comrads
- Released: June 27, 2000
- Genre: West Coast hip hop; gangsta rap
- Length: 48:32
- Label: Hoo-Bangin' Records; Priority Records
- Producer: Mack 10 (exec.); Binky Mack; Fredwreck; Gangsta; Young Tre; DJ Battlecat; Meech Wells; Keith Clizark; Ant Banks; VMF

The Comrads chronology
The Comrads (1997)	Wake Up & Ball (2000)

Professional ratings
Review scores
Source	Rating
AllMusic	2/5 stars

Wake Up & Ball is the second and final studio album by American West Coast hip hop duo The Comrads. It was released on June 27, 2000, via Hoo-Bangin'/Priority Records. Production was handled by Binky Mack, Fredwreck, Young Tre, DJ BattleCat, Meech Wells, Keith Clizark, Ant Banks, VMF and the Comrads' Terrell "Gangsta" Anderson. It features guest appearances from Krayzie Bone, Mack 10, MC Eiht and Snoop Dogg. The album peaked at #153 on the Billboard 200 albums chart in the United States.

== Track listing ==
No.	Title	Writer(s)	Producer(s)	Length
1.	"Intro"			1:07
2.	"That There"	T. Anderson; K. Garmon; K. Gilliam	Battlecat	4:16
3.	"Speak on It" (featuring Snoop Dogg)	T. Anderson; K. Garmon; C. Broadus; T. Green; M. Cenac	Young Tre	4:16
4.	"Wanna B Gangsta"	T. Anderson; K. Garmon; K. Clizark; M. Wells	Keith Clizark Meech Wells	3:58
5.	"Thug Niggaz" (featuring Mack 10)	T. Anderson; K. Garmon; D. Rollison; A. Banks	Ant Banks	3:54
6.	"The Examination"			0:23
7.	"Eazy Breezy"	T. Anderson; K. Garmon; J. Wilder	Fredwreck	4:16
8.	"Streets Is Talkin'"	T. Anderson; K. Garmon	Gangsta	4:16
9.	"Murder Murder" (featuring Krayzie Bone)	T. Anderson; K. Garmon; A. Henderson; R. Garner	Binky Mack	4:06
10.	"Dem Comrads"	T. Anderson; K. Garmon; F. Nassar	Fredwreck	4:16
11.	"Click Click Bang"	T. Anderson; K. Garmon; S. White; L. Harrison	VMF Productions	3:16
12.	"All Nighter"	T. Anderson; K. Garmon	Gangsta	3:31
13.	"Bom Bom" (featuring MC Eiht)	T. Anderson; K. Garmon; A. Tyler; R. Garner	Binky Mack	3:33
14.	"Copped and Dropped"	T. Anderson; K. Garmon; T. Green	Young Tre	3:24
Total length:				48:32

== Charts ==
Chart (2000)	Peak position
US Billboard 200	153
US Top R&B/Hip-Hop Albums (Billboard)	28
US Heatseekers Albums (Billboard)	8
