= Straight Outta Compton: N.W.A 10th Anniversary Tribute =

1998 tribute album by various artists

Compilation album by various artists
- Released: November 3, 1998
- Recorded: 1997–1998, except "Compton's N the House (Live)" recorded in 1989
- Genre: Hip-hop
- Length: 49:21
- Label: Priority
- Producer: Andrew M. Shack (exec.); Marvin Watkins (exec.); Ant Banks; Craig B.; DJ Yella; Dr. Dre; Krayzie Bone

Various artists chronology
Greatest Hits (1996)	Straight Outta Compton: N.W.A 10th Anniversary Tribute (1998)	The N.W.A Legacy, Vol. 1: 1988–1998 (1999)

Professional ratings
Review scores
Source	Rating
AllMusic	2.5/5 stars

Straight Outta Compton: N.W.A 10th Anniversary Tribute is a tribute album to the American hip-hop group N.W.A, released through Priority Records in 1998 on the tenth anniversary of the group's debut studio album Straight Outta Compton.

The album is composed of twelve of the thirteen songs in the order identical to the original, with "Something 2 Dance 2" being the only song not included despite a version performed by Compton's Most Wanted being recorded. The album is covered by N.W.A. members' affiliates, such as Ice Cube's Westside Connection groupmates WC and Mack 10 along with Hoo-Bangin' Records labelmates Allfrumtha I, Boo Kapone, MC Eiht and The Comrads, Eazy-E's protégés Gangsta Dresta and Bone Thugs-n-Harmony, and Dr. Dre's long time partner Snoop Dogg with Snoop's allies C-Murder and Silkk the Shocker, and Aftermath Ent. signee King Tee, as well as several other fellow rappers, including Ant Banks, Jayo Felony, J Dubb, Mr. Mike, Big Pun, Cuban Link and Fat Joe. Production was mostly handled by Ant Banks, as well as Craig B. of Beats by the Pound, Krayzie Bone, Dr. Dre and DJ Yella, with Andrew M. Shack and Marvin Watkins served as executive producers. The album peaked at number 142 on the Billboard 200 and 31 on the Top R&B/Hip-Hop Albums chart in the United States. A Music video was shot for the title track and the Silkk the Shocker version of "Express Yourself" was released as a single.

== Track listing ==
No.	Title	Writer(s)	Producer(s)	Length
1.	"Straight Outta Compton" (performed by MC Eiht, King T and Dre'sta)	O'Shea Jackson; Lorenzo Patterson; Eric Wright; Andre Young	Ant Banks	4:11
2.	"Fuck tha Police" (performed by Bone Thugs-n-Harmony)	Jackson; Patterson; Young	Krayzie Bone	5:01
3.	"Gangsta Gangsta" (performed by Snoop Dogg and C-Murder)	Jackson; Patterson; Wright; Young; Greg Webster; Andrew Noland; Leroy Bonner; Ralph Middlebrooks; Walter Morrison; Marshall Jones; Marvin Pierce; Norman Napier; Roger Parker; Steve Arrington; Charles Carter; Wayne Hankerson	Craig B	4:39
4.	"If It Ain't Ruff" (performed by WC)	Patterson; Young	Ant Banks	3:43
5.	"Parental Discretion Iz Advised" (performed by The Comrads, Allfrumtha I and Boo Kapone)	Jackson; Patterson; Wright	Ant Banks	4:18
6.	"8 Ball" (performed by Jayo Felony)	Jackson; Young	Ant Banks	4:24
7.	"Something Like That" (performed by J Dubb and Ant Banks)	Patterson; Young	Ant Banks	3:14
8.	"Express Yourself" (performed by Silkk the Shocker)	Charles Wright; Jackson	Ant Banks; Craig B	4:22
9.	"Compton's N the House (Live)" (performed by Dr. Dre and MC Ren)	Jackson; Patterson; Young	Dr. Dre; DJ Yella	2:01
10.	"I Ain't tha 1" (performed by Mr. Mike)	Jackson; Randy Muller	Ant Banks	5:28
11.	"Dopeman" (performed by Mack 10)	Jackson; Young; Webster; Noland; Bonner; Middlebrooks; Morrison; Jones	Ant Banks	4:00
12.	"Quiet on Tha Set" (performed by Big Punisher, Fat Joe and Cuban Link)	Patterson; Young	Ant Banks	4:00
Total length:				49:21

== Charts ==
Chart (1998)	Peak position
US Billboard 200	142
US Top R&B Albums (Billboard)	31
