= Chilldrin of da Ghetto =

Studio album by Chilldrin of da Ghetto
- Released: October 12, 1999
- Genre: Hip hop; gangsta rap
- Length: 58:48
- Label: Hoo-Bangin'; Priority
- Producer: Mack 10 (exec.); Goldiiz

Singles from Chilldrin of da Ghetto
- 1. "Wild Side" Released: March 23, 1999; 2. "Luv at First Sight" Released: August 3, 1999

Chilldrin of da Ghetto is the lone studio album by American rap group Chilldrin of da Ghetto (COG). It was released October 12, 1999 through Hoo-Bangin' Records with distribution via Priority Records. Production was handled entirely by COG member Goldiiz, with Mack 10 serving as executive producer. The album features guest appearances from Mack 10, Soultre, MC Eiht, Juvenile, B.G., and Barbara Wilson. It peaked at number 158 on the Billboard 200, at number 24 on the Top R&B/Hip-Hop Albums, and at number 8 on the Heatseekers Albums in the United States.

The album spawned two singles: "Wild Side" and "Luv at First Sight", the latter peaked at number 67 on the Billboard Hot R&B/Hip-Hop Songs and at number 6 on the Billboard Rap Songs. Along with a single, a music video was released for the song "Wild Side" with cameo appearances by MC Eiht and Mack 10. Songs "It's Time to Roll" and "Drug Lord" were originally heard in the 1999 film Thicker than Water and were also released on the film's soundtrack.

Chilldrin of da Ghetto is composed of Quentin "Goldiiz" Brown, Prentice "Bad Seed" Brown and Datqunn "P-Child" Sawyer. The group formed on the West Side of Chicago, in the Austin neighborhood on the section known as "L-Town", which is basically an area where within a mile all the north and south streets start the letter L.

== Critical reception ==
Professional ratings
Review scores
Source	Rating
AllMusic	3/5 stars
The Source	3.5/5 stars

Keith Farley of AllMusic - "...an intriguing hip-hop album chocked with the trio's intricate speed-raps and freestyling. The production...provides an excellent accompaniment to the raps on highlight tracks like "Intention to Kill" and "Wild Side".

The Source (11/99, p. 224) "...these three possess that country-twanged, tongue-twisting rhyming ability that has gained the Midwest its notoriety...the majority of the beats are original and provide the right amount of head nod to complement each quickened rhyme..."

== Aftermath ==
On April 5, 2012, Chilldrin of da Ghetto member Datqunn "P-Child" Sawyer was sentenced to 50 years in prison for coercing underage girls and vulnerable women into prostitution. In addition to the constant physical and sexual abuse his victims suffered, "P-Child" also "branded" his victims with new names that began with the letter "P" (in homage to his stage moniker) and gave them "P-Child" tattoos. Some of his victims were only 12 years old at the time. The sentence was the harshest penalty ever handed down to a convicted sex trafficker in the federal court of Chicago.

== Track listing ==
All music is composed by Quentin "Goldiiz" Brown.

No.	Title	Length
1.	"Intro"	1:23
2.	"Intention to Kill" (featuring Soultre)	5:12
3.	"Wild Side" (featuring Mack 10)	4:30
4.	"Luv at First Sight" (featuring Soultre)	4:59
5.	"Better Days"	4:03
6.	"It's Time to Roll" (featuring Mack 10)	5:22
7.	"Drug Lord" (featuring Barbara Wilson)	4:31
8.	"Celebration"	0:40
9.	"Party"	3:17
10.	"Across the Street"	4:23
11.	"Choke On" (featuring Barbara Wilson)	4:36
12.	"Lonely" (featuring B.G. & Juvenile)	4:49
13.	"Mistake"	4:42
14.	"Hoo Bangin' C.O.G. Style" (featuring Mack 10 & MC Eiht)	4:39
15.	"Outro"	1:42
Total length:		58:48

== Chart history ==
Chart (1999)	Peak position
US Billboard 200	158
US Top R&B/Hip-Hop Albums (Billboard)	24
US Heatseekers Albums (Billboard)	8
