= Nothin' But the Cavi Hit =

1996 single by Mack 10 and Tha Dogg Pound

Single by Mack 10 and Tha Dogg Pound

from the album Rhyme & Reason (soundtrack)
- B-side: "Is There a Heaven 4 a Gangsta?" (Master P)
- Released: November 23, 1996
- Recorded: 1996
- Genre: West Coast hip-hop; gangsta rap; G-funk
- Length: 4:03
- Label: Priority
- Songwriters: Delmar Arnaud; Ricardo Brown; Dedrick Rolison
- Producer: Dat Nigga Daz

Mack 10 singles chronology
"On Them Thangs" (1995)	"Nothin' But the Cavi Hit" (1996)	"Backyard Boogie" (1997)

Tha Dogg Pound singles chronology
"Let's Play House" (1995)	"Nothin' But the Cavi Hit" (1996)

Music video
- "Nothin' But the Cavi Hit" on YouTube

"Nothin' But the Cavi Hit" is a single by Mack 10 and Tha Dogg Pound from the Rhyme & Reason soundtrack. It was produced by a Dogg Pound member, Dat Nigga Daz and Master P's "Is There a Heaven 4 a Gangsta?" served as the single's B-side.

The song was a top-40 hit, reaching No. 38 on the Billboard Hot 100, becoming Tha Dogg Pound's only single to crack the top-40 and the first of two for Mack 10. In addition to the Rhyme & Reason soundtrack, "Nothin' But the Cavi Hit" has also appeared on several compilations, including The N.W.A Legacy, Vol. 1: 1988–1998, Foe Life: The Best of Mack 10 and The West Coast Blueprint.

The single was featured in the 2013 video game, Grand Theft Auto V on the radio station, West Coast Classics.

== Single track listing ==
=== A-side ===
1. "Nothin' But the Cavi Hit" (original explicit) – 4:03
2. "Nothin' But the Cavi Hit" (original clean) – 4:03
3. "Nothin' But the Cavi Hit" (original instrumental) – 4:04
4. "Nothin' But the Cavi Hit" (remix instrumental) – 3:51

=== B-side ===
1. "Is There a Heaven 4 a Gangsta?" (explicit) – 4:52
2. "Is There a Heaven 4 a Gangsta?" (clean) – 4:19
3. "Is There a Heaven 4 a Gangsta?" (instrumental) – 5:46

== Charts ==
=== Weekly charts ===
Chart (1997)	Peak position
US Billboard Hot 100	38
US Hot R&B/Hip-Hop Songs (Billboard)	24
US Hot Rap Songs (Billboard)	3
US Dance Club Songs (Billboard)	27
US Dance Singles Sales (Billboard)	9
