= CJ Mac =

American rapper and actor (born 1966)

- Born: Bryan Ross; Los Angeles, California, U.S.
- Genre: Hip hop
- Occupations: Rapper; actor
- Years active: 1990–present
- Labels: Rap-A-Lot; Hoo-Bangin'

Bryan Ross, known professionally as CJ Mac, is an American rapper and actor.

== Early life ==
CJ Mac was born and raised in Los Angeles, California.

== Music career ==
He released his independent debut EP, Color Me Funky, in 1991, under the name "CJ Mack." The disc is out of print. He returned in 1995 and released his debut album, True Game on Rap-A-Lot Records with producer Mad, the duo billed as Mad CJ Mac.

He appeared in the movie Thicker than Water with Mack 10 and Fat Joe, playing a drug lord called Gator.

His second album, Platinum Game (1999), was released through Mack 10's Hoo-Bangin' Records. It featured various rappers and peaked at number 77 on the R&B/Hip-hop album chart.

CJ Mac also directed a documentary called On the C-Walk (2003). He is also known for working with Death Row Records in late 2000 with his song "I Ain't Fuccin Wit' Cha" (from Too Gangsta for Radio), in which he insulted Dr. Dre for leaving the label and declaring gangsta rap dead.

== Discography ==
=== Studio albums ===
Title	Album details	Peak chart positions		
Title	Album details	US	US R&B	US Rap
True Game	Released: May 23, 1995; Label: Rap-A-Lot, Noo Trybe; Format: CD, LP, cassette	—	41	—
Platinum Game	Released: August 31, 1999; Label: Hoo-Bangin', Priority; Format: CD, LP, cassette	—	77	—

=== Extended plays ===
Title	EP details
Color Me Funky	Released: 1991; Label: Hard Way; Format: CD, LP, cassette

=== Guest appearances ===
Title	Release	Other artist(s)	Album
"Friday Night"	1995	Scarface	Friday soundtrack
"Who's the Biggest"	1995	Bushwick Bill	Phantom of the Rapra
"Make Money"	1997	Ant Banks, K-Dee	Big Thangs
"You Want Me Back"	1997	Ant Banks, Audrian, J-Dubb	Big Thangs
"Walk With Me"	1997	WC	Southwest Riders
"Gang Related"	1997	WC, Daz Dillinger, Big Tray Deee	Gang Related soundtrack
"Hoo-Ride 'N'"	1998	Allfrumtha I, Boo Kapone,The Comrads, WC	Allfrumtha I
"The Shadiest One"	1998	WC	The Shadiest One
"Like That"	1998	WC, Ice Cube, Daz Dillinger	The Shadiest One
"The Recipe"	1998	Mack 10, Boo Kapone, Techniec, Binky Mack	The Recipe
"Get a Lil Head"	1998	Mack 10, Boo Kapone, Techniec, Binky Mack	The Recipe
"#1 Crew in the Area"	1998	Mack 10, WC, K-Mac, Binky Mack, Boo Kapone, Techniec, Thump, MC Eiht, Road Dawgs	The Recipe
"On the Reala"	1999	T.W.D.Y., Agerman	Derty Werk
"King of L.A."	1999		Thicker than Water soundtrack
"Hate"	1999		Thicker than Water soundtrack
"Who Got Some Gangsta Shit"	1999	Mack 10, Bad Azz, Binky Mack, Road Dawgs, K-Mac and Techniec	Thicker than Water soundtrack
"CJ Mac (Interlude)"	1999	Ice-T	Seventh Deadly Sin
"Pounds On It"	1999	D.B.A., Kam	Doing Business As... The Album
"L.A. to the Bay"	1999	Homicide, Celly Cel, WC	The Plantation
"C and the Mac"	2000	C-Bo	Enemy of the State
"I Ain't Fuckin' Wit Cha"	2000		Too Gangsta for Radio
"Wired Up"	2000	T.W.D.Y., Yukmouth, Dru Down	Lead the Way
"Smile"	2001	Yukmouth, C-Bo	Thug Lord: The New Testament
"Undadawgs"	2002	C-Bo, Gangsta Dresta	Life as a Rider
"Jewel Lick"	2026	Ice-T	Criminal Migraine
