= Only in California =

1997 single by Mack 10 featuring Ice Cube and Snoop Doggy Dogg

Single by Mack 10 featuring Ice Cube and Snoop Doggy Dogg

from the album Based on a True Story
- Released: December 13, 1997
- Recorded: 1997
- Genre: West Coast hip-hop; gangsta rap; g-funk; hardcore hip-hop
- Length: 4:40
- Label: Priority
- Songwriters: Dedrick Rolison; O'Shea Jackson; Calvin Broadus; Delmar Arnaud; Priest Brooks
- Producers: Soopafly; Mack 10

Mack 10 singles chronology
"Backyard Boogie" (1997)	"Only in California" (1997)	"Let the Games Begin" (1998)

Ice Cube singles chronology
"Men of Steel" (1997)	"Only in California" (1997)	"We Be Clubbin'" (1997)

Snoop Doggy Dogg singles chronology
"We Just Wanna Party with You" (1997)	"Only in California" (1997)	"Still a G Thang" (1998)

Music video
- "Only in California" on YouTube

"Only in California" is a song by American rapper Mack 10 featuring Ice Cube and Snoop Doggy Dogg. It was the second and final single from Mack 10's studio album Based on a True Story.

== Live performances ==
Mack 10, Ice Cube, and Snoop Doggy Dogg performed the song live on The Keenen Ivory Wayans Show in 1997.

== Charts ==
=== Weekly charts ===
Chart (1997–1998)	Peak position
US Hot R&B/Hip-Hop Songs (Billboard)	52
