= Thicker than Water (soundtrack) =

Soundtrack album by Various artists
- Released: October 5, 1999
- Recorded: 1998–1999
- Genre: Hip hop
- Length: 2:01:02
- Labels: Hoo-Bangin'; Priority
- Producers: Mack 10 (also exec.); Binky Mack; Crazy Toones; DJ Battlecat; Goldiiz; Black Hole; Blaqthoven; Darryl Sloan; Don Juan; Gangsta; Greg Royal; Ish; J!; Jaz-O; Meech Wells; Nottz; Quincy Jones III; Russ Prez; Saukrates; Slej Tha Ruffedge; SPK; T-Mix; Wildstyle; Young Tre

Professional ratings
Review scores
Source	Rating
AllMusic	2.5/5 stars

Thicker than Water is a soundtrack to Richard Cummings Jr.'s 1999 film Thicker than Water. It was released on October 5, 1999 via Priority Records and consisted of two discs of hip hop music. The soundtrack peaked at number 64 on the Billboard 200 albums chart and number 8 on the Top R&B/Hip-Hop Albums chart. "Let It Reign" by the Westside Connection was released as a single.

== Track listing ==
Disc 1
No.	Title	Producer(s)	Length
1.	"Let It Reign" (performed by Westside Connection)	Crazy Toones	3:27
2.	"LB 2000" (performed by Techniec & Soultre)	Binky Mack	3:49
3.	"Live Life 2 tha Fullest" (performed by Memphis Bleek)	Big Jaz	3:58
4.	"Gang Bang Shit" (performed by Road Dawgs, Mack 10 & Squeak Ru)	Greg Royal	4:51
5.	"Thicker than Blood" (performed by Terror Squad)	Darryl Sloan; Nottz	4:07
6.	"The Belly of the Beast" (performed by Eightball & Big Duke)	T-Mix	4:52
7.	"Thicker than Water" (performed by MC Eiht & Val Young)	Black Hole	4:30
8.	"I Don't Wanna Die" (performed by King T)	SLEJ Da Ruff Edge	4:47
9.	"It's Time to Roll" (performed by Chilldrin of da Ghetto & Mack 10)	Goldiiz	5:21
10.	"King of L.A." (performed by CJ Mac)	Crazy Toones	3:28
11.	"Who Got Some Gangsta Shit" (performed by Mack 10, Bad Azz, CJ Mac, Binky Mack, Road Dawgs, K-Mac & Techniec)	Binky Mack	4:01
12.	"Survival of the Fittest" (performed by Dresta, WC & Young Shane)	Blaqthoven	4:09
13.	"Planet Rock" (performed by Tech N9NE)	Don Juan; Quincy Jones III	4:52

Disc 2
No.	Title	Producer(s)	Length
1.	"Wanna Be Gangsta" (performed by The Comrads & Soultre)	Keith Clizark & Meech Wells	4:04
2.	"Me & My Bitch" (performed by MC Eiht & Techniec)	Binky Mack	4:19
3.	"Half a Million" (performed by Soultre)	Ish; J!	4:54
4.	"Flagrant" (performed by Choclair)	Saukrates	4:33
5.	"Hate" (performed by CJ Mac)	Young Tre	4:05
6.	"Drug Lord" (performed by Chilldrin of da Ghetto)	Goldiiz	4:42
7.	"Partners in Crime" (performed by Mr. Mike)	DJ Battlecat; Mr. Mike (co.)	4:17
8.	"Do You Wanna Get with This" (performed by Soultre & Techniec)	Binky Mack	4:23
9.	"Police Rush the Spot" (performed by Thugged Out, Noreaga, Maze & Musolini)	SPK	4:18
10.	"Gangsta Gangsta" (performed by Mack 10)	Mack 10	4:59
11.	"Flex with You" (performed by Mechalie Jamison & Wildstyle)	Ralph "Wildstyle" Leverston	4:25
12.	"Blue Liquid" (performed by Beefy Loc & Swoop G)	DJ Battlecat	4:10
13.	"Mashin'-N-Smashin'" (performed by Boo Kapone & Techniec)	Binky Mack	3:46
14.	"U Know" (performed by Gangsta)	Gangsta	3:55
15.	"Freeze" (performed by MMO)	Russell "Russ Prez" Pressley	3:50
Total length:			2:01:02

== Personnel ==
- Damon Garrett Riddick – synthesizer (track 1), keyboards (track 21)
- Barbara Wilson – backing vocals (track 19)
- Kevin Gilliam – mixing (track 1)
- James Hoover – mixing (track 6)
- Mark Jordan – mixing (track 8)
- Joe Quinde – mixing (track 22)
- Brian Gardner – mastering
- Eddy Schreyer – mastering (track 4)
- Dedrick D'Mon Rolison – executive producer
- Art Shoji – art direction
- Michael Miller – photography
- Soultre’ - Nanci Fletcher|Indira Tyler|Mia Bell

== Charts ==
Chart (1999)	Peak position
US Billboard 200	64
US Top R&B/Hip-Hop Albums (Billboard)	8
