= Allfrumtha I (album) =

AllFrumTha I

Studio album by AllFrumTha I
- Released: April 21, 1998
- Recorded: 1997–1998
- Genre: West Coast hip hop; gangsta rap
- Length: 41:55
- Label: Priority
- Producer: Mack 10 (exec.); AllFrumTha I; Rick "Dutch" Cousin; Dâm-Funk

AllFrumTha I chronology
AllFrumTha I (1998)	Uncut (2001)

Singles from Allfrumtha I
- 1. "Fill My Cup (To tha Rim)" Released: 1998; 2. "County Jail" Released: 1998

AllFrumTha I (pronounced "All-From-The-Eye") is the debut studio album by American West Coast hip hop duo Allfrumtha I. It was released on April 21, 1998, through Priority Records. The production was handled by Allfrumtha I, Dâm-Funk and Rick "Dutch" Cousin, with Mack 10 serving as executive producer. It features guest appearances from Mack 10, Boo Kapone, CJ Mac, Ice Cube, Road Dawgs, Soultre, the Comrads, and WC. The album peaked at number 168 on the Billboard 200, at number 6 on the Billboard Top Heatseekers and at number 32 on the Billboard Top R&B/Hip-Hop Albums.

Along with singles, music videos were released for the songs: "County Jail" and "Fill My Cup". The video for "County Jail" features cameo appearances by Westside Connection, CJ Mac, The Comrads and Daz Dillinger.

The song "Get Yo Bang On" was originally heard in the film Gang Related and was also included in the film's soundtrack.

== Critical reception ==
Professional ratings
Review scores
Source	Rating
AllMusic	3/5 stars
The Source	3.5/5 stars
XXL	L (3/5)

Allfrumtha I received positive reviews from music critics. AllMusic's Leo Stanley thought the duo had an "enormous potential", adding that the album "appears to fulfill the potential of their cameos". Charlie Braxton of The Source thought the group "serve[s] up a scrumptious musical meal for fans to devour". He called Allfrumtha I a "solid LP", commending Squeak Ru's vocal performance, but criticized the album's second part. A reviewer for Vibe wrote: "Allfrumtha I is [...] just something to band while on the west side of your town". Richard Louissaint of XXL thought the group "follow[s] in Mack 10's footsteps by providing funk-filled beats and the usual gangstafied fanfare". He believed the strongest parts of the album were its "battle-oriented and braggadocio joints".

== Track listing ==
No.	Title	Producer(s)	Length
1.	"Gangsta's Prayer"	Dâm-Funk	1:18
2.	"Hoo-Ride 'N'" (featuring Boo Kapone, CJ Mac, The Comrads & WC)	Binky Mack	3:51
3.	"Fill My Cup (To Tha Rim)"	Rick "Dutch" Cousin	3:41
4.	"County Jail" (Insert)		0:35
5.	"County Jail"	AllFrumTha I	3:34
6.	"Get Yo Bang On" (featuring Mack 10)	Binky Mack	3:03
7.	"Caps" (featuring Road Dawgs)	AllFrumTha I	4:18
8.	"Guess Who"	AllFrumTha I	3:14
9.	"Tha Joke" (Insert)		0:26
10.	"Unthinkable"	Rick "Dutch" Cousin	3:52
11.	"Make You Dance" (featuring Mack 10 & Soultre)	Binky Mack	3:31
12.	"Dopest on Tha Planet" (featuring Mack 10 & Ice Cube)	Binky Mack	3:50
13.	"My Niggas" (Insert)		2:28
14.	"Rollin' Wit Connect"	Binky Mack	4:14
Total length:			41:55

Notes

- "County Jail" contains a sample from "So Ruff So Tuff", written by R. Troutman and L. Troutman
- "Make You Dance" contains an interpolation of "I Can Make You Dance", written by R. Troutman and L. Troutman

== Charts ==
Chart (1998)	Peak position
US Billboard 200	168
US Top R&B/Hip-Hop Albums (Billboard)	32
US Heatseekers Albums (Billboard)	6
