= Money's Just a Touch Away =

1998 single by Mack 10 featuring Gerald Levert

Single by Mack 10 featuring Gerald Levert

from the album The Recipe
- Released: December 15, 1998
- Genre: Hip hop
- Length: 4:33
- Label: Priority; Hoo-Bangin'
- Songwriters: Dedrick Rolison; Gerald Levert; Steven Wade; David Weldon; Frederick Jackson; Barry Eastmond
- Producers: Slice; Rhythm D

Mack 10 singles chronology
"Let the Games Begin" (1998)	"Money's Just a Touch Away" (1998)	"I Want It All" (1999)

Gerald Levert singles chronology
"Taking Everything" (1998)	"Money's Just a Touch Away" (1998)	"Breakin' My Heart" (1999)

Music video
- "Money's Just a Touch Away" on YouTube

"Money's Just a Touch Away" is a song by American rapper Mack 10, released as the second single from his third studio album The Recipe (1998) on December 15, 1998. It features American R&B singer Gerald Levert. Produced by Slice and Rhythm D, the song contains an interpolation of "Love Is Just a Touch Away" by Freddie Jackson and sample of "Please Listen to My Demo" by EPMD.

Nathan Rabin of AllMusic called the song a "too-slick attempt at radio-friendly crossover success".

== Charts ==
Chart (1998)	Peak position
US Billboard Hot 100	54
US Hot R&B/Hip-Hop Songs (Billboard)	31
US Hot Rap Songs (Billboard)	5
