= Backyard Boogie =

1997 single by Mack 10

Single by Mack 10

from the album Based on a True Story
- B-side: "Only in California"
- Released: July 22, 1997
- Recorded: 1996
- Genre: West Coast hip-hop; gangsta rap; g-funk
- Length: 4:19
- Label: Priority
- Songwriter(s): Bobby Ervin, Mack 10
- Producer(s): DJ Bobcat

Mack 10 singles chronology
"Nothin' But the Cavi Hit" (1996)	"Backyard Boogie" (1997)	"Only in California" (1997)

Music video
- "Backyard Boogie" on YouTube

"Backyard Boogie" is the lead single released from Mack 10's second album, Based on a True Story. The song was produced by Bobby "DJ Bobcat" Ervin and mixed by Ant Banks.

Released just prior to the release of Based on a True Story, "Backyard Boogie" became Mack 10's biggest hit on the Billboard Hot 100, reaching a peak of number 37. It became his second and final solo top-40 hit, after the previous year's "Nothin' But the Cavi Hit", a duet with Tha Dogg Pound. It also peaked at number 5 on the Hot Rap Songs chart, now known as the Rap Songs chart. It is one of the rapper's most successful songs to date. The song helped the album debut at number 14 on the Billboard 200 and get certified gold by the Recording Industry Association of America. On the single version of "Backyard Boogie", its follow-up single, "Only in California" featuring Ice Cube and Snoop Dogg, is also included. It never charted but was included on Based on a True Story.

== Single track listing ==
1. "Backyard Boogie" – 4:11
2. "Backyard Boogie" (Instrumental) – 4:29
3. "Only In California" – 4:30 (featuring Ice Cube and Snoop Dogg)
4. "Only In California" (Instrumental) – 4:30

== Charts ==
=== Peak positions ===
Chart (1997)	Peak position
Billboard Hot 100	37
Billboard Hot R&B/Hip-Hop Singles & Tracks	23
Billboard Hot Rap Singles	5

=== Year-End charts ===
End of year chart (1997)	Position
Billboard Hot R&B/Hip-Hop Singles & Tracks	99
Billboard Hot Rap Singles	33
