= Mack 10 (album) =

Studio album by Mack 10
- Released: June 20, 1995
- Recorded: 1994–1995
- Genre: West Coast hip-hop; gangsta rap; G-funk
- Length: 47:53
- Label: Priority
- Producer: Ice Cube; the 88X Unit; Crazy Toones; Dr. Jam; Madness 4 Real

Mack 10 chronology
Mack 10 (1995)	Based on a True Story (1997)

Singles from Mack 10
- 1. "Foe Life" Released: April 29, 1995; 2. "On Them Thangs" Released: July 22, 1995; 3. "Westside Slaughterhouse" Released: December 16, 1995

Mack 10 is the debut solo studio album by American rapper Mack 10. It was released on June 20, 1995, via Priority Records. The album was produced by Ice Cube, the 88X Unit, Dr. Jam, Madness 4 Real, and Crazy Toones. It features guest appearances from Ice Cube, WC, and K-Dee.

The album peaked at number 33 on the Billboard 200 and went Gold by the Recording Industry Association of America on September 12, 1995. The song "Foe Life" was used in the 1997 film Anaconda, starring producer Ice Cube.

== Critical reception ==
Professional ratings
Review scores
Source	Rating
AllMusic	3/5 stars
Chicago Tribune	2.5/5 stars
RapReviews	7.5/10

The Chicago Tribune noted that Mack 10's "crime is that his rhymes do little to elucidate the pathos of living with violence as a viable—if not necessary—option... Although Mack 10 has his mentor's sneer and a funkier sound, he has little of Cube's vitality."

== Track listing ==
No.	Title	Writer(s)	Producer(s)	Length
1.	"Mickey D's Lick" (Intro)			0:51
2.	"Foe Life"	Mack 10; Ice Cube	Ice Cube	4:14
3.	"Wanted Dead"	Mack 10	Ice Cube	3:57
4.	"On Them Thangs"	Mack 10	The 88X Unit	5:07
5.	"Pigeon Coup"			0:31
6.	"Chicken Hawk"	Mack 10	Dr. Jam	4:23
7.	"Here Comes the G"	Mack 10	Crazy Toones	4:12
8.	"Westside Slaughterhouse" (featuring WC and Ice Cube)	Mack 10; Ice Cube; WC	Madness 4 Real	4:58
9.	"Niggas Dog Scraping"			0:34
10.	"Armed & Dangerous"	Mack 10	Ice Cube	3:08
11.	"H-O-E-K" (featuring K-Dee)	Mack 10; K-Dee	Ice Cube	3:38
12.	"10 Million Ways"	Mack 10	Ice Cube	4:22
13.	"Mozi-Wozi"	Ice Cube	Ice Cube	4:39
14.	"Mack 10's the Name"	Mack 10	The 88X Unit	3:19
Total length:				47:53

Sample credits

- Track 4 contains an interpolation of "Mary Jane" written and performed by Rick James
- Track 7 contains a sample from "Remind Me" written and performed by Patrice Rushen
- Track 10 contains samples from "Devotion" written by Maurice White & Philip Bailey and performed by Earth, Wind & Fire, and "Flashlight" written by George Clinton, William Collins & Bernie Worrell and performed by Parliament
- Track 12 contains a sample from "A.J. Scratch" written and performed by Kurtis Blow
- Track 13 contains an interpolation of "Devotion" written by Maurice White & Philip Bailey and performed by Earth, Wind & Fire

== Charts ==
=== Weekly charts ===
Chart (1995)	Peak position
US Billboard 200	33
US Top R&B/Hip-Hop Albums (Billboard)	2

=== Year-end charts ===
Chart (1995)	Position
US Top R&B/Hip-Hop Albums (Billboard)	46

== Certifications ==
Region	Certification	Certified units/sales
United States (RIAA)	Gold	500,000^{^}
^{^} Shipments figures based on certification alone.
