= The Recipe (album) =

Studio album by Mack 10
- Released: October 6, 1998
- Genre: Gangsta rap
- Length: 1:05:41
- Label: Priority; Hoo-Bangin'
- Producer: Mack 10 (also exec.); Binky Mack; Clint "Payback" Sands; DJ U-Neek; KLC; Rhythm D; Rick "Dutch" Cousin; Slice; Snoop Dogg; Young Tre

Mack 10 chronology
Based on a True Story (1997)	The Recipe (1998)	The Paper Route (2000)

Singles from The Recipe
- 1. "Let the Games Begin" Released: September 27, 1998; 2. "Money's Just a Touch Away" Released: December 15, 1998

Professional ratings
Review scores
Source	Rating
AllMusic	3/5 stars
Los Angeles Times	3/4 stars
The Source	4/5 stars

The Recipe is the third solo studio album by American rapper Mack 10. It was released October 6, 1998, via Priority Records and Mack 10's Hoo-Bangin' Records. The album was produced by Mack 10, Young Tre, Binky Mack, DJ U-Neek, Rhythm D, Rick "Dutch" Cousin, Slice, Clint "Mr. Payback" Sands, KLC, and Snoop Dogg. It features guest appearances from Big Pun, Tray Deee, Boo Kapone, Buckshot, CJ Mac, Eazy-E, Fat Joe, Foxy Brown, Gerald Levert, Jayo Felony, Jermaine Dupri, Master P, MC Eiht, Mystikal, Ol' Dirty Bastard, Road Dawgs, Snoop Dogg, Techniec, Thump da Hooddwella, KoЯn, and all the members of Allfrumtha I, the Comrads, and Westside Connection.

The album debuted at number 15 on the Billboard 200, number 6 on the Top R&B/Hip-Hop Albums, and was certified Gold by the Recording Industry Association of America on December 3, 1998, for shipments and sales of over 500,000 copies in America. Two singles were released from the album: "Let the Games Begin" and "Money's Just a Touch Away", the latter of which peaked at number 54 on the Billboard Hot 100. Music videos were produced for both singles.

== Track listing ==
No.	Title	Writer(s)	Producer(s)	Length
1.	"Intro"			1:02
2.	"The Recipe" (featuring Boo Kapone, Techniec, Binky Mack and CJ Mac)	Dedrick Rolison; Joseph Johnson; David Williams, Jr.; Ryan Garner; Bryaan J. Ross	Binky Mack	4:59
3.	"You Ain't Seen Nothin'" (featuring Jermaine Dupri and Foxy Brown)	Rolison; Jermaine Dupri; Inga Marchand; Treyvon Green; Edward Irons; Reggie Hargis; Raymond Ransom	Young Trey	3:58
4.	"Made Niggaz" (featuring Master P and Mystikal)	Rolison; Percy Miller; Michael Tyler; Craig Stephen Lawson	KLC	3:18
5.	"Get Yo' Ride On" (featuring Eazy-E and MC Eiht)	Rolison; Eric Wright; Aaron Tyler; S. Wade; David Weldon	Mack 10; Slice; Rhythm D	3:37
6.	"Money's Just a Touch Away" (featuring Gerald Levert)	Rolison; Gerald Levert; Wade; Weldon; Frederick Jackson; Barry Eastmond	Slice; Rhythm D	4:34
7.	"Suck Down" (Insert)			0:29
8.	"Get a Lil Head" (featuring Boo Kapone, Techniec, Binky Mack and CJ Mac)	Rolison; Johnson; Williams, Jr.; Garner; Ross; Rick Cousin; Harry Wayne Casey	Rick "Dutch" Cousin	4:29
9.	"For the Money" (featuring Ol' Dirty Bastard and Buckshot)	Rolison; Russell Jones; Kenyatta Blake; Green; Robert Steven Belew; Steven Stanley; Martina Weymouth; Chris Frantz	Mack 10; Young Trey	4:33
10.	"Ghetto Horror Show" (featuring Ice Cube and Jayo Felony)	Rolison; O'Shea Jackson; James Savage; Tim Middleton	Mack 10; DJ U-Neek	4:46
11.	"LBC and the ING" (featuring Snoop Dogg)	Rolison; Calvin Broadus; Kenton Nix	Mack 10; Snoop Dogg	4:36
12.	"Radio Insert: Funk Master Flex" (featuring Funkmaster Flex)			0:18
13.	"Let the Games Begin" (featuring Fat Joe and Big Punisher)	Rolison; Joseph Cartagena; Christopher Rios; Green	Young Trey	3:37
14.	"#1 Crew in the Area" (featuring WC, K-Mac, CJ Mac, Binky Mack, Boo Kapone, Techniec, Thump, MC Eiht and Road Dawgs)	Rolison; William Calhoun; Kelly Garmon; Ross; Garner; Johnson; Williams, Jr.; Thump; Jonte Ray; Christopher Norwood; Middleton	DJ U-Neek	5:07
15.	"Gangsta Shit's Like a Drug" (featuring Tray Deee and Squeak Ru)	Rolison; Tracy Davis; Marcus Moore; Clinton Sands	Mr. Payback	3:57
16.	"The Letter"	Rolison; Garner	Binky Mack	3:50
17.	"Should I Stay or Should I Go" (featuring Ice Cube and KoЯn)	Rolison; Jackson; Nicholas Headon; Michael Jones; Paul Simonon; John Strummer	Rick "Dutch" Cousin	4:09
18.	"Outro"			0:22
Total length:				1:05:41

Sample credits

- Track 3 contains an interpolation of "Dazz" written by Edward Irons, Reggie Hargis and Raymond Ransom and performed by Brick
- Track 6 contains an interpolation of "Love Is Just a Touch Away" written by Freddie Jackson and Barry Eastmond and performed by Freddie Jackson
- Track 8 contains an interpolation of "Get Down Tonight" written by Harry Wayne Casey and performed by KC and the Sunshine Band
- Track 9 contains a sample from "Genius of Love" written by Adrian Belew, Steven Stanley, Tina Weymouth and Chris Frantz and performed by Tom Tom Club
- Track 11 contains a sample from "Heartbeat" written by Kenton Nix and performed by Taana Gardner
- Track 17 contains elements of "Should I Stay or Should I Go" written by Nicholas Headon, Michael Jones, Paul Simonon and John Strummer and performed by the Clash

== Charts ==
Chart (1998)	Peak position
US Billboard 200	15
US Top R&B Albums (Billboard)	6

== Certifications ==
Region	Certification	Certified units/sales
United States (RIAA)	Gold	500,000^{^}
^{^} Shipments figures based on certification alone.
