= Based on a True Story (Mack 10 album) =

Studio album by Mack 10
- Released: September 16, 1997
- Recorded: 1996–1997
- Genre: West Coast hip-hop; gangsta rap; G-funk
- Length: 50:08
- Label: Priority
- Producer: Ant Banks; Binky Mack; Bobcat; Ice Cube; Mack 10; Soopafly; Young Tre

Mack 10 chronology
Mack 10 (1995)	Based on a True Story (1997)	The Recipe (1998)

Singles from Based on a True Story
- 1. "Backyard Boogie" Released: July 22, 1997; 2. "Only in California" Released: December 13, 1997

Professional ratings
Review scores
Source	Rating
AllMusic	4/5 stars
Christgau's Consumer Guide	(choice cut)
The Source	4/5 stars

Based on a True Story is the second solo studio album by American rapper Mack 10. It was released on September 16, 1997, through Priority Records. The album was produced by Ant Banks, Binky Mack, DJ Bobcat, Young Tre, Ice Cube, Soopafly, and Mack 10. It features guest appearances from Ice Cube, Allfrumtha I, E-40, Snoop Dogg, the Comrads, and Too $hort. The album debuted at number 14 on the Billboard 200, number 5 on the Top R&B/Hip-Hop Albums, and was certified Gold by the Recording Industry Association of America on October 21, 1997.

Along with singles, music videos were produced for two songs: "Backyard Boogie" and "Only in California" featuring Ice Cube and Snoop Dogg. Ice Cube makes a cameo appearance in "Backyard Boogie".

The song "Can't Stop" was previously released on Ant Banks' compilation album Big Thangs. "Dopeman", a cover version of the 1987 N.W.A song of the same name, was later included on two Priority Records compilations In tha Beginning...There Was Rap and Straight Outta Compton: N.W.A 10th Anniversary Tribute.

== Track listing ==
No.	Title	Writer(s)	Producer(s)	Length
1.	"Mack Manson (Intro)" (featuring Ice Cube)			0:54
2.	"Chicken Hawk II" (featuring Ice Cube)	Dedrick Rolison; Treyvon Green	Young Trey	2:43
3.	"Mack 10, Mack 10" (featuring Allfrumtha I and The Comrads)	Rolison; Ryan Garner; Marcus Moore; Kelly Garmon; Terrell Anderson	Binky Mack	4:00
4.	"Bangin Gears (Insert)" (featuring Ice Cube)			0:48
5.	"Backyard Boogie"	Rolison; Bobby Ervin	Bobcat	4:19
6.	"Can't Stop" (featuring E-40)	Rolison; Earl Stevens; Anthony Banks	Ant Banks	4:25
7.	"Tonight's the Night" (featuring Squeak Ru)	Rolison; Banks	Ant Banks	3:16
8.	"Aqua Boogie" (Insert)			0:57
9.	"The Guppies" (featuring Ice Cube)	Rolison; O'Shea Jackson; Garner	Binky Mack	4:52
10.	"Inglewood Swangin'"	Rolison; Ervin	Bobcat; Mack 10	3:59
11.	"Dopeman"	Rolison; Jackson; Banks	Ant Banks	4:03
12.	"What You Need? (Dopeman '97)"	Rolison; Garner	Binky Mack	3:24
13.	"Only in California" (featuring Ice Cube and Snoop Doggy Dogg)	Rolison; Jackson; Calvin Broadus; Delmar Arnaud; Priest Brooks	Soopafly; Mack 10	4:40
14.	"Gangster Poem" (Insert)			0:53
15.	"W/S foe Life"	Rolison; Jackson; Garner	Binky Mack; Ice Cube	2:40
16.	"Based on a True Story" (featuring Too $hort)	Rolison; Banks	Ant Banks	4:15
Total length:				50:08

Sample credits

- Track 3 contains a sample from "Roxanne, Roxanne" written by Jeffrey Campbell, Shiller Shaun Fequiere, Fred Reeves, Curt Bedeau, Gerry Charles, Hugh Junior Clark, Brian "B-Fine" George, Paul Anthony George and Lucien George and performed by UTFO
- Track 7 contains a sample from "Buffalo Gals" written by Trevor Horn, Malcolm McLaren and Anne Dudley and performed by Malcolm McLaren & the World's Famous Supreme Team
- Track 10 contains an interpolation of "Hollywood Swinging" written by Robert "Kool" Bell, Ronald Bell, George M. Brown, Robert "Spike" Mickens, Claydes Charles Smith, Dennis R. Thomas and Rick A. Westfield and performed by Kool & the Gang

== Personnel ==
- Dedrick "Mack 10" Rolison – main artist, producer (tracks: 10, 13)
- O'Shea "Ice Cube" Jackson – vocals (tracks: 1, 2, 4, 9, 13), producer (track 15)
- Ryan "Binky Mack" Garner – vocals (track 3), producer (tracks: 3, 9, 12, 15)
- Marcus "Squeak Ru" Moore – vocals (tracks: 3, 7)
- Kelly "K-Mac" Garmon – vocals (track 3)
- Terrell "Gangsta" Anderson – vocals (track 3)
- Earl "E-40" Stevens – vocals (track 6)
- Calvin "Snoop Dogg" Broadus – vocals (track 13)
- Todd "Too $hort" Shaw – additional vocals (track 16)
- James "Tre" Rabb – guitar (track 6)
- Treyvon "Young Tre" Green – producer (track 2)
- Bobby "Bobcat" Ervin – producer (tracks: 5, 10)
- Anthony "Ant" Banks – producer (tracks: 6, 7, 11, 16)
- Priest "Soopafly" Brooks – producer (track 13)
- Carlos Warlick – engineering, mixing
- Brian "Big Bass" Gardner – mastering
- Art "Shō-G" Shoji – artwork
- Michael Miller – photography
- Marlene C. Durio – A&R
- Marvin Watkins – A&R

== Charts ==
=== Weekly charts ===
Chart (1997)	Peak position
US Billboard 200	14
US Top R&B Albums (Billboard)	5

=== Year-end charts ===
Chart (1997)	Position
US Top R&B/Hip-Hop Albums (Billboard)	95

== Certifications ==
Region	Certification	Certified units/sales
United States (RIAA)	Gold	500,000^{^}
^{^} Shipments figures based on certification alone.
