= The Substitute (soundtrack) =

Soundtrack album by Various artists
- Released: April 9, 1996
- Recorded: 1995–1996
- Genre: Hardcore hip hop; gangsta rap
- Length: 44:48
- Label: Priority
- Producer: Andrew Shack (exec.); Sharal Churchill (exec.); Binky Mack; Courtney Branch; Fredwreck; Ice Cube; Jay Leopardie; Kenneth "K-Phlx" Manning; KLC; Michael "Flip" Barber; Mo B. Dick; Organized Konfusion; Prodeje; Ras Kass; Rhythm D; Tracy Kendrick

Professional ratings
Review scores
Source	Rating
AllMusic	3/5 stars

The Substitute: Original Motion Picture Soundtrack is the original soundtrack to Robert Mandel's 1996 crime film The Substitute. It was released on April 9, 1996, via Priority Records and consisted entirely of hip hop music. The album peaked at #90 on the Billboard 200 chart and #18 on the Top R&B/Hip-Hop Albums chart.

== Track listing ==
No.	Title	Producer(s)	Length
1.	"Hoo-Bangin'" (performed by Mack 10)	Ice Cube	3:36
2.	"Licorice Stiks" (performed by Intense Method)	Rhythm D	4:15
3.	"Danger" (performed by Road Dawgs & Allfrumtha I)	Binky Mack	3:03
4.	"Miami Life" (performed by Ras Kass)	Ras Kass; Michael "Flip" Barber	4:08
5.	"Bring It On" (performed by Organized Konfusion)	Organized Konfusion	4:19
6.	"Bang 'Em Up" (performed by TRU & Mr. Serv-On)	KLC	3:03
7.	"Head Up" (performed by Young Murder Squad & Sh'killa)	Prodeje; Tomie Mundy (co.)	4:12
8.	"I Got That Cream" (performed by Master P)	Mo B. Dick	5:06
9.	"Hood Life" (performed by Lil' ½ Dead)	Courtney Branch; Kenneth "K-Phlx" Manning; Tracy Kendrick	4:49
10.	"Money, Power & Women" (performed by G-Spot-Geez)	Fredwreck	5:00
11.	"All of Puerto Rico" (performed by Afro-Rican)	Jay Leopardie; Afro-Rican (co.)	3:17
Total length:			44:48
