= Foe Life =

Single by Mack 10

from the album Mack 10
- Released: April 29, 1995
- Studio: Lench Mob Studios
- Genre: West Coast hip hop; gangsta rap; g-funk
- Length: 4:14
- Label: Priority
- Songwriters: Dedrick Rolison; O'Shea Jackson
- Producer: Ice Cube

Mack 10 singles chronology
"Foe Life" (1995)	"On Them Thangs" (1995)

Music video
- "Foe Life" on YouTube

"Foe Life" is a hip hop song by American gangsta rapper Mack 10. It was released in April 1995 through Priority Records as the lead single from his debut studio album, Mack 10 (1995). The recording sessions took place at Lench Mob Studios with the production was handled by Ice Cube. The single peaked at numbers 71 and 80 on the US Billboard Hot 100 and Cash Box Top 100 charts.

An accompanying music video showed Mack 10 cruising through the 'Wood in his custom Cadillac coupe lowrider, which would become part of his album artwork. The video shows the rapper spoofing the Menace II Society opening, knocking off a rim shop, and fighting his case before a judge. Ice Cube made a cameo appearance in the video, playing Mack's getaway driver at one heist. After breaking from the courtroom on foot, Mack jumps from the roof of the city building.

The song can be heard in Luis Llosa's 1997 film Anaconda.

== Track listing ==
No.	Title	Length
1.	"Foe Life" (LP Version)	4:14
2.	"Foe Life" (Radio)	4:04

== Personnel ==
- Dedrick "Mack 10" Rolison – songwriter, vocals
- O'Shea "Ice Cube" Jackson – songwriter, producer, engineering
- Keston Wright – mixing

== Charts ==
Chart (1995)	Peak position
US Billboard Hot 100	71
US Cash Box Top 100	80
