= Paper Route =

A paper route or newspaper route (paper round or newspaper round in British English) is the subscription list of a paperboy typically following a fixed route every day.

Paper Route may also refer to:

- Paper Route (band), an indie band from Nashville, Tennessee
- "Paper Route", a 2019 song by Hooligan Hefs
- The Paper Route, a 2000 album by rapper Mack 10

== See also ==
- Paper Route Frank, a forthcoming posthumous 2022 album by Young Dolph
