= Rhyme & Reason (soundtrack) =

Rhyme & Reason (Original Motion Picture Soundtrack)

Soundtrack album by Various artists
- Released: January 14, 1997
- Recorded: 1996
- Studio: Various: Track Records (Los Angeles, CA); Flipmode Recording Studios (New York, NY); Ultimate Sounds Studio (Houston, TX); Real Life Recordings (Brooklyn, NY); Bass Hit Studios (New York, NY); Chicago Recording Company (Chicago, IL); The Mob Shop (Vallejo, CA); 36 Chambers Studio (Manhattan, NY); Cherokee Studios (Hollywood, CA); D&D Studios (New York, NY); Hollywood Sound Recorders (Hollywood, CA); Firehouse Studio (Brooklyn, NY); The Green Room (Atlanta, GA); Soundcastle (Los Angeles, CA); No Limit Studios
- Genre: Hip-hop
- Length: 1:04:40
- Label: Priority
- Producer: Andrew M. Shack (exec.); Happy Walters (exec.); Peter Spirer (co-exec.); Charles X Block (co-exec.); Big Dex; Blac Earl; Busta Rhymes; Craig B; Crazy C; Daz Dillinger; E-40; Fabian Hamilton; GuRu; KLC; KRS-One; MC Eiht; Mo B. Dick; O.G. Style; Clever Kisum; Studio Ton; The Ummah; Tony "Touch" Isaac; True Master; Wildstyle; RZA (co.)

Singles from Rhyme & Reason
- 1. "Nothin' But the Cavi Hit" Released: November 23, 1996

Professional ratings
Review scores
Source	Rating
AllMusic	3/5 stars

Rhyme & Reason (Original Motion Picture Soundtrack) is the soundtrack to Peter Spirer's 1997 documentary film Rhyme & Reason. It was released on January 14, 1997 through Priority Records. The album found a great deal of success, peaking at #16 on the Billboard 200 and #1 on the Top R&B/Hip-Hop Albums chart in the United States.

== Track listing ==
No.	Title	Writer(s)	Producer(s)	Length
1.	"Nothin' But the Cavi Hit" (performed by Mack-10 & Tha Dogg Pound)	D. Rolison; D. Arnaud; R. Brown	Dat Nigga Daz	4:03
2.	"Wild Hot" (performed by Busta Rhymes & A Tribe Called Quest)	J. Davis; T. Smith	The Ummah; Busta Rhymes	3:03
3.	"Reason for Rhyme" (performed by 8Ball & MJG)	M. Goodwin; P. Smith; S. Cullins	Crazy C	5:01
4.	"Uni-4-Orm" (performed by Ras Kass, Heltah Skeltah & Canibus)	G. Williams; J. Bush; J. Austin; S. Price; F. Hamilton; D. Owen	Fabian Hamilton	4:44
5.	"Bogus Mayn" (performed by Crucial Conflict)	C. Johnson; W. Martin; M. King; R. Leverston	Ralph "Wildstyle" Leverston	4:44
6.	"Every Year" (performed by E-40)	E. Stevens; E. Hurd; M. Whitemon	Studio Ton; E-40	3:59
7.	"Tragedy" (performed by RZA)	R. Diggs; D. Harris	True Master; RZA (co.)	3:47
8.	"Represent" (performed by MC Eiht)	A. Tyler	MC Eiht	4:49
9.	"Niggaz Don't Want It" (performed by Lost Boyz)	T. Kelly; R. Rogers	Big Dex	4:55
10.	"Bring It Back" (performed by KRS-One)	L. Parker	KRS-One	5:04
11.	"Is There a Heaven 4 a Gangsta?" (performed by Master P)	P. Miller	Craig B; KLC; Mo B. Dick	3:35
12.	"Liquor Store Run" (performed by Volume 10)	D. Hawkins	Clever Kisum	4:38
13.	"The Way It Iz" (performed by GuRu, KaiBee & Lil' Dap)	K. Elam; K. Graham; J. Heath	GuRu	4:01
14.	"Business First" (performed by Nyoo & DeCoca)	D. McLaughlin; D. Heard; S. Blagmon	Blac Earl	4:15
15.	"No Identify" (performed by Delinquent Habits)	K. Thomas; I. Martin; A. Martines	O.G. Style	4:02
Total length:				1:04:40

Sample credits

- Track 2 contains elements from "The Human Fly" as performed by Lalo Schifrin
- Track 9 contains elements from "Go Stetsa I" as performed by Stetsasonic
- Track 10 contains samples of "Don't Play That Song (You Lied)" as performed by Ben E. King and of "Ya Slippin'" as performed by KRS-One
- Track 12 contains a sample from "More Bounce to the Ounce" by Zapp and an interpolation of "Flashlight" by Parliament

== Charts ==
=== Weekly charts ===
Chart (1997)	Peak position
US Billboard 200	16
US Top R&B/Hip-Hop Albums (Billboard)	1

=== Year-end charts ===
Chart (1997)	Position
US Top R&B/Hip-Hop Albums (Billboard)	69

== Certifications ==
Region	Certification	Certified units/sales
United States (RIAA)	Gold	500,000^{^}
^{^} Shipments figures based on certification alone.

== See also ==
- List of Billboard number-one R&B albums of 1997
