= The Comrads (album) =

Studio album by The Comrads
- Released: July 8, 1997
- Genre: West Coast hip hop; gangsta rap
- Length: 40:46
- Label: Street Life Records
- Producer: Mack 10 (exec.); Gangsta; "Big Jess" Willard; Young Tre; Bub; Binky Mack; Ant Banks

The Comrads chronology
The Comrads (1997)	Wake Up & Ball (2000)

Singles from The Comrads
- 1. "Homeboyz" Released: 1997; 2. "Die Hard" Released: 1997; 3. "Get at Me (Call Me)" Released: September 9, 1997

Professional ratings
Review scores
Source	Rating
AllMusic	3/5 stars

The Comrads is a self-titled debut studio album by American West Coast hip hop duo The Comrads. It was released on July 8, 1997 via Street Life Records. Production was handled by "Big Jess" Willard, Young Tre, Bub, Binky Mack, Ant Banks and the Comrads' Terrell "Gangsta" Anderson. It features guest appearances from Westside Connection and AllFrumTha I. The album peaked at #113 on the Billboard 200 albums chart in the United States. Its single "Homeboyz" was also charted on the Billboard charts.

== Track listing ==
No.	Title	Writer(s)	Producer(s)	Length
1.	"Intro"	T. Anderson; K. Garmon	Gangsta	1:01
2.	"Die Hard"	T. Anderson; K. Garmon	Gangsta	3:13
3.	"Game Recognize Game" (featuring Mack 10)	T. Anderson; K. Garmon; D. Rollison; J. Willard	"Big Jess" Willard; Carlos Warlick (co.)	3:36
4.	"Get at Me (Call Me)"	T. Anderson; T. Green; L. Troutman; R. Waller; R. Troutman	Young Tre	4:18
5.	"Candyland" (featuring Lil' Jess)	T. Anderson; J. Willard	Jess "Big Jess" Willard; Gangsta	1:38
6.	"Playa Hata"	T. Anderson; K. Garmon	Gangsta; Bub	3:12
7.	"Bitch Made Niggaz"	T. Anderson; K. Garmon; T. Green; A. Young; B. Worrell; G. Clinton, Jr.; L. Patterson; T. Curry; W. Collins	Young Tre	4:05
8.	"Car" (Interlude)	T. Anderson; K. Garmon	Gangsta; Bub	0:33
9.	"Homeboyz"	T. Anderson; K. Garmon	Gangsta; Bub	3:14
10.	"Bustas"	T. Anderson; K. Garmon	Gangsta	3:22
11.	"Big Ballers"	T. Anderson; K. Garmon; R. Garner	Binky Mack	3:38
12.	"Dear Bitch" (Interlude)	T. Anderson; K. Garmon; R. Garner	Ant Banks	0:35
13.	"Hey You"	T. Anderson; K. Garmon; A. Banks; J. Nyx; M. Gaye	Ant Banks	4:16
14.	"Westside Connect OG's" (featuring AllFrumTha I and Westside Connection)	T. Anderson; K. Garmon; D. Rollison; O. Jackson; W. Calboun; M. Moore	Gangsta	4:05
Total length:				40:46

== Charts ==
Chart (1997)	Peak position
US Billboard 200	113
US Top R&B/Hip-Hop Albums (Billboard)	33
US Heatseekers Albums (Billboard)	2
