= Connected for Life =

Single by Westside Connection featuring Butch Cassidy

from the album Bang or Ball and Music From and Inspired by the Motion Picture xXx: A New Breed of Secret Agent
- Released: May 28, 2002
- Recorded: 2001
- Studio: Sugar Hill Studios (Houston, Texas); PatchWerk Recording Studios (Atlanta, Georgia); Sony Music Studios (New York, New York)
- Genre: Hip-hop
- Length: 9:05
- Label: Cash Money; Universal
- Songwriter(s): Dedrick Rolison; O'Shea Jackson; William Calhoun; Byron Thomas
- Producer(s): Mannie Fresh

Mack 10 singles chronology
"Hate in Yo Eyes" (2001)	"Connected for Life" (2002)	"It's the Holidaze" (2002)

Ice Cube singles chronology
"$100 Bill Y'all" (2001)	"Connected for Life" (2002)	"It's the Holidaze" (2002)

WC singles chronology
"Connected" (2001)	"Connected for Life" (2002)	"The Streets" (2002)

Butch Cassidy singles chronology
"Tarantula" (2002)	"Connected for Life" (2002)	"Talk to Me" (2004)

Music video
- "Connected For Life" on YouTube

"Connected for Life" is a song performed by American West Coast hip-hop trio Westside Connection. It was released on May 28, 2002 via Cash Money/Universal Records as the third and final single from Mack 10's fifth solo studio album Bang or Ball. Recording sessions took place at Sugar Hill Studios in Houston, PatchWerk Recording Studios in Atlanta and Sony Music Studios in New York. Produced by Mannie Fresh, it features vocals from fellow American singer Butch Cassidy. In the United States, the single peaked at number 57 on the Hot R&B/Hip-Hop Songs and number 56 on the R&B/Hip-Hop Airplay charts. The song also appeared in Music From and Inspired by the Motion Picture xXx: A New Breed of Secret Agent.

== Track listing ==
12" vinyl
No.	Title	Length
1.	"Connected for Life" (Album Version)
2.	"Connected for Life" (Main/Clean Version)
3.	"Connected for Life" (Instrumental)
4.	"Connected for Life" (Acappella)

CD single
No.	Title	Length
1.	"Connected for Life" (Clean Album)	4:34
2.	"Connected for Life" (Main/Clean)	4:31
Total length:		9:05

== Personnel ==
- Dedrick "Mack 10" Rolison – vocals
- O'Shea "Ice Cube" Jackson – vocals
- William "WC" Calhoun Jr. – vocals
- Danny "Butch Cassidy" Means – vocals
- Byron "Mannie Fresh" Thomas – producer, recording, mixing
- Brian "Big Bass" Gardner – mastering
- Ronald "Slim" Williams – executive producer
- Bryan "Birdman" Williams – executive producer
- Dino Delvaille – A&R
- Adrienne Muhammad – A&R

== Charts ==
Chart (2002)	Peak position
US Hot R&B/Hip-Hop Songs (Billboard)	57
US R&B/Hip-Hop Airplay (Billboard)	56
