= Kanary Diamonds =

American rapper

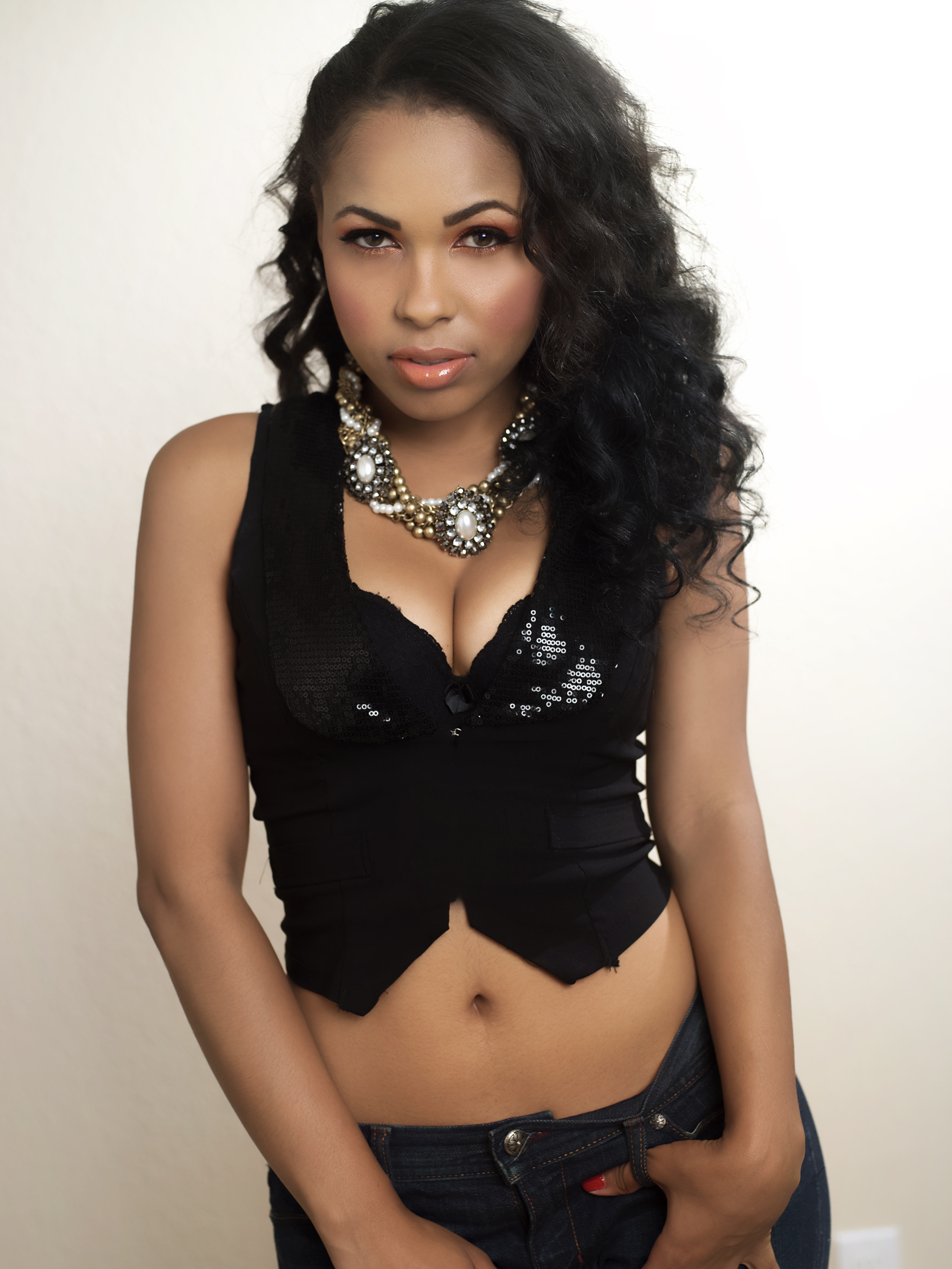

Background information
- Born: Johnean Jimenez; September 2, 1989 (age 36); Watts, Los Angeles, California, United States
- Genres: Hip hop
- Occupations: Rapper, entertainer
- Label: EMPIRE Fontana
- Website: www.kanarydiamonds.com

Kanary Diamonds, born September 2, 1989, as Johnean Jimenez in Watts, California, is an American rapper and entertainer. Diamonds worked as a dancer in videos and after becoming a member of a Destiny's Child-styled group that never made it off the ground, Diamonds got her big break when she landed a guest spot on Mack 10's 2005 album, Hustla's Handbook with the song “By the Bar.” She made an appearance on Chingy's Hoodstar album and then her song was in the movie and on the soundtrack to the film Waist Deep. Her songs have been on the soundtracks for TV shows like MTV's Making the Band, The Real World, and Road Rules, while her collaboration with Tatyana Ali was featured on the 2007 reggaeton compilation Puro Fuego. She has been featured on The Game's mixtape "The Red Room” and has also joined forces with Colby O'Donis, Yo-Yo, Glasses Malone, Kam, Lady of Rage, and others.

== Career ==
Kanary Diamonds has had numerous placements both as features on records and in TV and film. Diamonds' songs have been placed in various television shows on MTV, CBS, Oxygen, VH1, Showtime, BET and more. Television shows and films she has had music placed in are Kimora: Life in the Fab Lane, Bad Girls Club, Code Name the Cleaner starring Lucy Liu and Cedric the Entertainer, and Waist Deep starring Tyrese Gibson, Meagan Good, The Game, and Lorenz Tate. The video, “Mirror, Mirror” was featured on BET’s The Deal. She has performed at Comedy Union, Rhythm Lounge, Magic Johnson’s Mardi Gras, and NBA All-Star Events, not to mention opening for KRS-One. Kanary Diamonds' second project, No Gravity, which includes soulful production and is full of variety and hard-hitting lyrics was such a success, it was featured on WorldStarHipHop.com as DatPiff's mixtape pick #2.

== TV and film placements ==
Kanary Diamonds' music has been placed in television (Love and Hip Hop Atlanta, Teen Wolf, 90210, Melrose Place, Glee, CSI Miami, Bad Girls Club, Jersey Shore, Love Games, Hit the Floor, MADE, True Justice, The Real L Word, Men of a Certain Age, The Real World Las Vegas, Born to Dance, Chicago Code, The Hard Times of RJ Berger, The Challenge, Fly Girl, Blue Mountain State, Insatiable and Gigantic) and films (Like Mike 2: Streetball, Waist Deep, Codename: The Cleaner, Made and Super Swag).

== Filmography ==
=== Film ===
Slumber Party	Lead Role	Image Entertainment
Mamas Foot	Supporting Role	Image Entertainment
Unemployment	Supporting Role	Lionsgate Video Distribution

=== Commercials ===
Coca-Cola	Supporting Role
Double Dutch	Co-Star with Shannen Doherty (Japan)

=== Music videos ===
Kendrick Lamar “She Needs Me”	Lead	Interscope Records
The Game “Let’s Ride”	Supporting Role	Interscope Records
The Game “Cherry Kool Aide”	Supporting Role	Interscope Records
The Game “It Must Be Me”	Lead	Interscope Records
Gwen Stefani “Luxurious”	Supporting Role	Interscope Records

== Discography ==
- Mirror Mirror - EP (2009)
- No Gravity (2013)
- Kanary Diamonds (2013)
