= Hustla's Handbook =

Studio album by Mack 10
- Released: September 27, 2005
- Recorded: 2005
- Studio: Hoo Bangin Studios
- Genre: West Coast hip hop; gangsta rap
- Length: 58:07
- Label: Hoo-Bangin'; Capitol
- Producer: Mack 10 (exec.); Fredwreck (also exec.); Deviossi; DL; J Classic; Lil Sin; MD Productions; Midi Mafia; MyGuyMars; Rance; Ron "Neff-U" Feemstar; Young Tre

Mack 10 chronology
Ghetto, Gutter & Gangsta (2003)	Hustla's Handbook (2005)	Soft White (2009)

Singles from Hustla's Handbook
- 1. "Like This" Released: August 4, 2005

Professional ratings
Review scores
Source	Rating
AllMusic	3/5 stars
RapReviews	7/10

Hustla's Handbook is the seventh solo studio album by American rapper Mack 10. It was released on September 27, 2005, via Hoo-Bangin'/Capitol Records. Production was handled by Bruce Waynne, Dirty Swift, DL, Fredwreck, J Classic, Ron "Neff-U" Feemstar, Lil' Sin, MD Productions, MyGuyMars, Rance, Young Soprano (p.k.a. Deviossi), and Young Tre. It features guest appearances from Wanted, Butch Cassidy, Bigga Brown, B-Real, Bre Perry, Chingy, DJ, DL, Kanary Diamonds, Nate Dogg, Pastor Steven Hamilton, Red Café, Ruka Puff and Traci Nelson. The album debuted at number 65 on the Billboard 200 and number 13 on the Top R&B/Hip-Hop Albums in the United States. Its lead single, "Like This", was an underground success and was also used in the soundtrack for Vondie Curtis-Hall's 2006 film Waist Deep.

== Track listing ==
No.	Title	Writer(s)	Producer(s)	Length
1.	"Like This" (featuring Nate Dogg)	Dedrick D'Mon Rolison; Nathaniel Hale; Andre Taylor; Louis Harden	Music Doctorz Productions	3:50
2.	"Da Bizness"	Rolison; Andrew Price II	Young Soprano	4:10
3.	"Pop" (featuring Red Café and Wanted)	Rolison; Jermaine Denny; Jimmy Tucker; Price II; Lamar Edwards; Larrance Dopson	MyGuyMars; Rance	4:12
4.	"Dome Shot" (featuring Young Soprano)	Rolison; Price II; Deshaun Taylor	DL	2:49
5.	"Don't Hate Me" (featuring DL, Wanted and Traci Nelson)	Rolison; D. Taylor; Tucker; Price II; Theron Feemster	Ron "Neff-U" Feemster	4:06
6.	"The Testimony" (featuring Young Soprano and Pastor Steven Hamilton)	Rolison; Price II; Feemster	Ron "Neff-U" Feemster	3:59
7.	"Step Yo Game Up" (featuring B-Real, DJ and Traci Nelson)	Rolison; Louis Freese; Farid Nassar	Fredwreck	3:42
8.	"So Gangsta" (featuring Butch Cassidy)	Rolison; Danny Means; Kevin Risto; Waynne Nugent; Curtis Mayfield	Midi Mafia	3:13
9.	"I'm a Star" (featuring Ruka Puff and Bigga Brown)	Rolison; Byron Waters; Jay Anthony Robert Brown; Sherman Houston	Lil' Sin	3:57
10.	"My Chucks"	Rolison; Jeremy Cranon; Shaheim Smith	J Classic	3:20
11.	"Keep It Hood" (featuring Bre Perry)	Rolison; Bre Perry; Risto; Nugent	Midi Mafia	4:24
12.	"Cognac & Doja" (featuring Butch Cassidy and Young Soprano)	Rolison; Means; Price II; Treyvon Green	Young Tre	3:47
13.	"By the Bar" (featuring Kanary Diamonds and Wanted)	Rolison; Johnean Jimenez; Tucker; Price II; Cranon; Smith	J Classic	3:56
14.	"Mack Sinatra" (Skit)	Rolison; Nassar		0:39
15.	"Livin Just to Ball" (featuring Lashann Dendy, Nikisha Grier and Traci Nelson)	Rolison; Nassar	Fredwreck	4:23
16.	"Ride Out" (featuring Chingy)	Rolison; Howard Bailey; D. Taylor	DL	3:40
Total length:				58:07

Notes

- Tracks 5, 7 and 15 features vocals from Traci Nelson
- Track 12 features backing vocals from Isaac Reese
- Track 15 features vocals from Lashann Dendy and Nikisha Grier
- Track 16 is listed as a bonus track

Sample credits

- Track 8 contains samples from "Man's Temptation" written by Curtis Mayfield and performed by Isaac Hayes

== Personnel ==
- Dedrick "Mack 10" Rolison – main performer, executive producer
- Nathaniel "Nate Dogg" Hale – featured artist (track 1)
- Andrew "Deviossi"/"Young Soprano" Price II – featured artist (tracks: 3–6, 12, 13), producer (track 2)
- Jimmy "Skoop Delania" Tucker – featured artist (tracks: 3, 5, 13)
- Jermaine "Red Café" Denny – featured artist (track 3)
- Deshaun "DL" Taylor – featured artist (track 5), producer (tracks: 4, 16)
- Pastor Steven Hamilton – featured artist (track 6)
- Louis "B-Real" Freese – featured artist (track 7)
- DJ – featured artist (track 7)
- Danny "Butch Cassidy" Means – featured artist (tracks: 8, 12)
- Byron "Ruka Puff" Waters – featured artist (track 9)
- Jay "Bigga Brown" – featured artist (track 9)
- Bre Perry – featured artist (track 11)
- Johnean "Kanary Diamonds" Jimenez – featured artist (track 13)
- Howard "Chingy" Bailey Jr. – featured artist (track 16)
- Traci Nelson – vocals (tracks: 5, 7, 15)
- Lashann Dendy – vocals (track 15)
- Nikisha Grier – vocals (track 15)
- Isaac Reese – backing vocals (track 12)
- Farid "Fredwreck" Nassar – keyboards (tracks: 2, 7, 15), flute (track 7), guitar (track 15), producer (tracks: 7, 15), recording (track 1), mixing (tracks: 1–12, 15), executive producer
- Erick Todd Coomes – bass & guitar (track 7)
- The Velvet Orchestra – strings (track 7)
- Andre Taylor – producer (track 1)
- Louis Harden – producer (track 1)
- Lamar "MyGuyMars" Edwards – producer (track 3)
- Larrance "Rance" Dopson – producer (track 3)
- Theron "Neff-U" Feemster – producer (tracks: 5, 6)
- Waynne "Bruce Waynne" Nugent – producer (tracks: 8, 11)
- Kevin "Dirty Swift" Risto – producer (tracks: 8, 11)
- Sherman "Lil Sin" Houston – producer (track 9)
- Jeremy Cranon – producer (tracks: 10, 13)
- Shaheim Smith – producer (tracks: 10, 13)
- Treyvon "Young Tre" Green – producer (track 12)
- Ken Koroshetz – recording (tracks: 2–13, 15, 16), mixing (tracks: 13, 16)
- Brian "Big Bass" Gardner – mastering
- Andrew Shack – co-executive producer
- Rob Abeyta – design
- Estevan Oriol – photography
- Candyce Handley – A&R
- Kevin Faist – A&R

== Charts ==
Chart (2005)	Peak position
US Billboard 200	65
US Top R&B/Hip-Hop Albums (Billboard)	13
