= True Game =

Studio album by Mad CJ Mac
- Released: May 23, 1995
- Recorded: 1994–1995
- Studios: The Crack House (Richmond, Virginia); Master Sounds Studios (Richmond, Virginia); One Up Studio; Echo Sound (Los Angeles, California); Digital Services (Houston, Texas)
- Genres: West Coast hip hop; gangsta rap; g-funk
- Length: 50:34
- Labels: Rap-A-Lot; Noo Trybe
- Producers: J. Prince (exec.); CJ Mac; Mad

CJ Mac chronology
Color Me Funky (1991)	True Game (1995)	Platinum Game (1999)

Singles from True Game
- 1. "Come and Take a Ride" Released: May 20, 1995; 2. "Powda Puff" Released: 1995

Professional ratings
Review scores
Source	Rating
AllMusic	3/5 stars
RapReviews	7.5/10

True Game is the only album by American hip hop duo Mad CJ Mac. It was released on May 23, 1995 via Rap-A-Lot Records and Noo Trybe Records. Recording sessions took place at the Crack House and at Master Sounds Studios in Richmond, Virginia, at One Up Studio, at Echo Sound in Los Angeles, and at Digital Services in Houston. Production was handled by members Mad and CJ Mac, with J. Prince serving as executive producer. It features guest appearances from Poppa LQ, SexC, Tré Unique and J. Prince. The album peaked at number 41 on the US Billboard Top R&B/Hip-Hop Albums.

Along with singles, music videos were released for the songs "Come and Take a Ride" and "Powda Puff".

== Track listing ==
All tracks are written by Bryan Ross and Clement Burnette, except for the track 4 written with Kenneth Green.

No.	Title	Length
1.	"Intro"	1:59
2.	"Let My Niggas Out Tha Pen"	4:45
3.	"True Game"	3:17
4.	"Come and Take a Ride" (featuring Poppa LQ)	4:04
5.	"Realism"	2:58
6.	"Powda Puff"	4:56
7.	"Losin' My Mind"	5:56
8.	"Can't Cee Thee Ahh!"	4:02
9.	"Tryina Survive"	3:40
10.	"Trust No"	4:41
11.	"Dead Man Walkin'"	5:07
12.	"Moment of Silence"	0:18
13.	"I Can't Stand a Rat"	4:51
Total length:		50:34

== Personnel ==
- Bryaan "CJ Mac" Ross – main artist, songwriter, producer
- Clement "Mad" Burnette – main artist, songwriter, producer
- Clement Burnette, Sr. – electric guitar
- D.J. Will – scratches (track 3)
- SexC – backing vocals (tracks: 3, 4)
- Kenneth "Poppa LQ" Green – featured artist, vocals & songwriter (track 4)
- Chris Beasley – electric guitar (track 6)
- Tré Unique – backing vocals (track 11)
- James Smith – voice (track 12), executive producer
- James Hoover – engineering, mixing
- Mike Dean – engineering, mixing
- John Moran – mastering
- Jason Clark – art direction, design
- Ken Hollis – photography

== Chart history ==
Chart (1995)	Peak position
US Top R&B Albums (Billboard)	41
