= Ghetto, Gutter & Gangsta =

Studio album by Mack 10
- Released: July 22, 2003
- Recorded: 2003
- Studio: Hoo Bangin Studios
- Genre: West Coast hip hop; gangsta rap
- Length: 1:13:14
- Label: Bungalo; Hoo-Bangin'; Universal
- Producer: Mack 10 (exec.); Young Tre; Damizza; Droop-E; King Tech

Mack 10 chronology
Mack 10 Presents da Hood (2002)	Ghetto, Gutter & Gangsta (2003)	Hustla's Handbook (2005)

Singles from Ghetto, Gutter & Gangsta
- 1. "Lights Out" Released: May 16, 2003

Professional ratings
Review scores
Source	Rating
RapReviews	5.5/10

Ghetto, Gutter & Gangsta is the sixth studio album by the American gangsta rapper Mack 10. It was released on July 22, 2003, via Hoo-Bangin'/Bungalo Records with distribution by Universal Music. Recording sessions took place at Hoo Bangin Studios. Production was handled by Young Tre, Damizza, Droop-E, King Tech and E. Lamore, with Mack 10 serving as executive producer. It features contributions from Be Brazy, Butch Cassidy, Cousteau, Deviossi, E-40, Fat Joe, J-Man, K-Mac, Knoc-turn'al, Money Grip, Reservoir Dogs, Skoop Delania, The Mossie, Turf Talk, Westside Connection and Young Hoggs. The album peaked at No. 105 on the Billboard 200 albums chart in the United States.

== Track listing ==
Ghetto, Gutter & Gangsta CD
No.	Title	Writer(s)	Producer(s)	Length
1.	"Intro"		Young Tre	0:07
2.	"Lights Out" (performed by Westside Connection and Knoc-turn'al)	Dedrick D'Mon Rolison; O'Shea Jackson; William Loshawn Calhoun Jr; Damion Young	Damizza	3:26
3.	"K to the M.A.C." (performed by K-Mac)	Kelly Garmon; Treyvon Green	Young Tre	3:35
4.	"Please Believe It" (performed by Mack 10, Skoop Delania, Deviossi, K-Mac and Money Grip)	Rolison; Jimmy Tucker; Andrew Price II; Garmon; Money Grip; Green	Young Tre	4:03
5.	"Get Yo Ride On" (performed by Hoo-Bangin' Gangstas)	Rolison; Kenric Dion Frelix; Green	Young Tre	3:51
6.	"Promise to Be a Hustla" (performed by Mack 10, Skoop Delania, Deviossi, K-Mac and Cousteau)	Rolison; Tucker; Price II; Garmon; Cousteau; Green	Young Tre	4:20
7.	"Figaro Rida" (performed by B-Brazy)	Bruce Anthony Parrish Jr; Green	Young Tre	3:57
8.	"Ain't Got a Penny to Give" (performed by Young Hoggs)	Lionell J. Tillman; Royce C. Mims; Green	Young Tre	3:44
9.	"The Big Bang Theory (Insert)" (performed by Mack 10)		Young Tre	1:27
10.	"S.O.O. W.O.O. (Remix)" (performed by Mack 10 and Reservoir Dogs)	Rolison; Frelix; John C. Johnson; Rod Sepand	King Tech	4:35
11.	"Dirt" (performed by Mack 10, Fat Joe and Damizza)	Rolison; Joseph Cartagena; Young	Damizza	4:06
12.	"Gather 'Round" (performed by Young Hoggs)	Tillman; Mims; Anthony L. Johnson; Kareem Cormier; Shante Snow; James Williams; Green	Young Tre	3:54
13.	"Gangsta" (performed by Young Hoggs, Money Grip and Young Tre)	Nutso; Taboo; Money Grip; Green	Young Tre	4:04
14.	"The Weed Song" (performed by Young Hoggs, Skoop Delania and Deviossi)	Tillman; Mims; A. Johnson; Cormier; Snow; Williams; Tucker; Price II; Green	Young Tre	5:09
15.	"Look at Us Now" (performed by Mack 10, Skoop Delania, Deviossi, Cousteau and Butch Cassidy)	Rolison; Tucker; Price II; Cousteau; Danny Elliott Means II; Green	Young Tre	3:41
16.	"Live Wire" (performed by Young Hoggs)	Tillman; Mims; A. Johnson; Cormier; Snow; Williams; Green	Young Tre	3:19
17.	"Page I" (performed by Reservoir Dogs)	Frelix; J. Johnson; B. Sims; Green	Young Tre	3:48
18.	"Double Fisted" (performed by E-40 and The Mossie)	Earl Stevens; Dulon Stevens; Kevin Davis; E. Lamore	E. Lamore	3:45
19.	"In the Heart of the Ghetto" (performed by Turf Talk)	Demar Bernstine; Earl Stevens Jr	Droop-E	4:28
20.	"Rule the World" (performed by J-Man)	James Ransom; Green	Young Tre	3:42
21.	"Outro" (performed by Mack 10)			0:13
Total length:				1:13:14

Ghetto, Gutter & Gangsta DVD
No.	Title	Length
1.	"On & Crackin'"
2.	"Hoo Bangin'"
3.	"Live @ the House of Blues"
4.	"Connect Game"
5.	"Earth Is My Turf"
6.	"40"
7.	"Bang or Ball"
8.	"Echo Studios"
9.	"Da Hood"
10.	"For My Niggas" (featuring The Comrads)
11.	"Da Hood Is Mine" (featuring MC Eiht and Techniec)
12.	"Money Just a Touch Away" (featuring Gerald Levert)
13.	"Thicker Than Water" (featuring MC Eiht and Val Young)
14.	"Credits"

== Charts ==
Chart (2003)	Peak position
US Billboard 200	105
US Top R&B/Hip-Hop Albums (Billboard)	28
US Independent Albums (Billboard)	2
