= Bang or Ball =

Studio album by Mack 10
- Released: December 4, 2001
- Recorded: 2000–01
- Genres: West Coast hip-hop; gangsta rap
- Length: 1:11:04
- Labels: Cash Money; Universal
- Producers: Dr. Dre; Mannie Fresh; Quincy Jones III; Ron

Mack 10 chronology
The Paper Route (2000)	Bang or Ball (2001)	Mack 10 Presents da Hood (2002)

Singles from Bang or Ball
- 1. "Hate In Yo Eyes" Released: September 3, 2001; 2. "Connected for Life" Released: November 9, 2001; 3. "Do the Damn Thang" Released: December 11, 2001

Professional ratings
Review scores
Source	Rating
AllMusic	3.5/5 stars
HipHopDX	3.5/5
Los Angeles Times	3/4 stars
RapReviews	7/10
The Source	3.5/5 stars

Bang or Ball is the fifth solo studio album by American rapper Mack 10. It was released on December 4, 2001, through Cash Money Records with distribution via Universal Records. The album was produced by Mannie Fresh, Dr. Dre, Ron, and Quincy Jones III, with Ronald "Slim" Williams and Birdman serving as executive producers. It features guest appearances from Big Tymers, B.G., Mikkey, Butch Cassidy, E-40, Lac & Stone, Lil Wayne, Scarface, Skoop Delania, Turk, Xzibit, and Westside Connection. The album peaked at number 48 on the Billboard 200 and number 4 on the Top R&B/Hip-Hop Albums.

== Track listing ==
No.	Title	Writer(s)	Producer(s)	Length
1.	"Intro"			0:50
2.	"Hate in Yo Eyes"	Dedrick Rolison; Andre Young; Barry Gibb; Maurice Gibb; Robin Gibb	Dr. Dre	5:13
3.	"Let the Thugs in the Club" (featuring Lil Wayne and B.G.)	Rolison; Dwayne Carter; Christopher Dorsey; Byron Thomas	Mannie Fresh	4:54
4.	"So Serious" (featuring Big Tymers and Mikkey)	Rolison; Bryan Williams; Mikkel Nance; Thomas	Mannie Fresh	5:08
5.	"Connected for Life" (performed by Westside Connection and Butch Cassidy)	Rolison; O'Shea Jackson; William Calhoun; Thomas	Mannie Fresh	4:23
6.	"Dominoes"			0:58
7.	"That Bitch Is Bad" (featuring Big Tymers)	Rolison; Thomas	Mannie Fresh	5:03
8.	"Do the Damn Thing"	Rolison; Thomas	Mannie Fresh	5:06
9.	"King Pin Dream" (featuring Mikkey and Big Tymers)	Rolison; Nance; Williams; Thomas	Mannie Fresh	5:08
10.	"Work"	Rolison; Theron Feemster	Ron	4:21
11.	"No Dick" (Skit)			1:02
12.	"No Dick at All" (featuring Skoop Delania and E-40)	Rolison; Earl Stevens; Thomas	Mannie Fresh	4:45
13.	"Mathematics"	Rolison; Williams; Nance; Thomas	Mannie Fresh	4:15
14.	"Let It Be Known" (featuring Scarface and Xzibit)	Rolison; Brad Jordan; Alvin Joiner; Thomas	Quincy Jones III	4:39
15.	"Announcement" (Skit)			0:52
16.	"We Can Never Be Friends" (featuring Big Tymers, Lac & Stone)	Rolison; Williams; Kedrick Moore; Alvin Nelson; Thomas	Mannie Fresh	5:21
17.	"Dog About It" (featuring B.G.)	Rolison; Dorsey; Thomas	Mannie Fresh	4:55
18.	"Murder" (featuring Turk and Big Tymers)	Rolison; Thomas	Mannie Fresh	4:11
Total length:				1:11:04

Sample credits

- Track 2 contains an interpolation of "Stayin' Alive" written by Barry Gibb, Maurice Gibb and Robin Gibb and performed by the Bee Gees.
- Track 3 contains a sample of "More Bounce to the Ounce" written by Roger and Larry Troutman and performed by Zapp.
- Track 5 contains an interpolation of "Niggaz 4 Life" by N.W.A.

== Charts ==
Chart (2001)	Peak position
US Billboard 200	48
US Top R&B/Hip-Hop Albums (Billboard)	4
