= The Paper Route =

Studio album by Mack 10
- Released: September 5, 2000
- Recorded: 2000
- Genre: West Coast hip hop; gangsta rap
- Length: 48:56
- Label: Hoo-Bangin'; Priority
- Producer: Mack 10 (also exec.); Beatballers; Caviar; Easy Mo Bee; Leslie Brathwaite; Mark Twayne; Overdose; Rick Rock; Timbaland; Young Tre

Mack 10 chronology
The Recipe (1998)	The Paper Route (2000)	Bang or Ball (2001)

Singles from The Paper Route
- 1. "From tha Streetz" Released: August 13, 2000; 2. "Tight to Def" Released: October 17, 2000

Professional ratings
Review scores
Source	Rating
AllMusic	3/5 stars
HipHopDX	3/5
Los Angeles Times	2.5/4 stars

Paper Route is the fourth solo studio album by American rapper Mack 10. It was released on September 5, 2000, through Hoo-Bangin'/Priority Records. The album was produced by Rashad Coes, Beatballers, Caviar, Easy Mo Bee, Leslie Brathwaite, Mark Twayne, Overdose, Rick Rock, Timbaland, and Young Tre. It features guest appearances from Techniec, Big Gipp, Caviar, Jazze Pha, Kokane, Pinky, Skoop Delania, T-Boz, Too $hort, Xzibit, YoungBloodZ, and Westside Connection. The album debuted at number nineteen on the U.S. Billboard 200 chart, with 47,000 copies in its first-week of sales.

== Track listing ==
No.	Title	Writer(s)	Producer(s)	Length
1.	"Intro" (Parody of Frosty the Snowman)	D'Mon Dedrick Rolison; Walter E. "Jack" Rollins; Steve Edward Nelson		0:20
2.	"From tha Streetz"	Rolison; Treyvon Green; Jalil Hutchins; Drew Carter; John Fletcher; Lawrence Smith	Young Tre; Mack 10 (co.)	3:23
3.	"Nobody" (featuring Westside Connection and Timbaland)	Rolison; O'Shea Jackson; William Calhoun; Timothy Mosley	Timbaland	5:11
4.	"I'm Special" (Skit)			0:24
5.	"I'm Dope"	Rolison; Rashad Coes; Terrell Anderson	Rashad Coes	4:08
6.	"Pimp or Die" (featuring Techniec and Too $hort)	Rolison; David Williams III; Todd Shaw; Dennis Johnson; S. Gold	Beat Ballers	4:11
7.	"Tight to Def" (featuring T-Boz)	Rolison; Tionne Watkins; Coes; Dino Hawkins; Nick Vidal; Eric Vidal; Roger Troutman; Michael Alford	Rashad Coes; Mack 10 (co.); T-Boz (co.)	4:59
8.	"Pop X" (featuring Techniec, Caviar, Xzibit, Skoop Delania and Pinky)	Rolison; Williams III; Jimmy Tucker; Coes	Rashad Coes	4:03
9.	"Keep It Gangsta" (featuring Jazze Pha)	Rolison; Phalon Alexander; Ricardo Thomas	Rick Rock	4:03
10.	"Hustle Game"	Rolison; Osten Harvey	Easy Mo Bee	3:51
11.	"Spousal Abuse" (featuring Techniec and Kokane)	Rolison; Williams III; Jerry Long; Kannon Cross; William Moore	Caviar; Overdose	4:07
12.	"For Sale" (featuring YoungBloodZ, Big Gipp and Techniec)	Rolison; Jeffrey Raymond Grigsby; Sean Paul Ryan Joseph; Cameron Gipp; Williams III	Mark Twayne	3:57
13.	"Tha Weekend" (featuring Ice Cube and Techniec)	Rolison; Jackson; Williams III; Leslie Brathwaite	Leslie Brathwaite	6:33
Total length:				48:56

== Charts ==
Chart (2000)	Peak position
US Billboard 200	19
