= Mack 10 Presents Da Hood =

Studio album by Da Hood
- Released: July 23, 2002
- Recorded: 2002
- Genre: West Coast hip-hop; gangsta rap
- Length: 46:06
- Label: D3 Entertainment; Riviera Entertainment; Hoo Bangin'
- Producer: Mack 10 (exec.); Leslie Brathwaite; Lil' Jon; Rashad Coes; Timbaland; Young Tre

Mack 10 chronology
Bang or Ball (2001)	Mack 10 Presents Da Hood (2002)	Ghetto, Gutter & Gangsta (2003)

Singles from Da Hood
- 1. "L.A. Fo' Ya" / "Hittin' Switches" Released: April 25, 2002

Professional ratings
Review scores
Source	Rating
AllMusic	2.5/5 stars
HipHopDX	3/5
RapReviews	5/10
Vibe	2/5

Mack 10 Presents Da Hood is the only collaborative studio album by American rappers Mack 10, Deviossi (deceased), Skoop Delania, K-Mac, Cousteau and Techniec (together known as Da Hood). It was released July 23, 2002, through D3 Entertainment and Hoo Bangin' with distribution via Riviera Entertainment. Production was handled by Young Tre, Leslie Brathwaite, Lil' Jon, Rashad Coes and Timbaland, with Mack 10 serving as executive producer. It features guest appearances from Ice Cube, Lil' Jon, Cash Money Millionaires, and Timbaland. The album peaked at number 40 on the Billboard 200, at number 9 on the Top R&B/Hip-Hop Albums, and at number 2 on the Independent Albums in the United States.

Along with a single, a music video was released for the song "Hittin' Switches" and features cameo appearances by Stacey Dash and Layzie Bone.

== Track listing ==
No.	Title	Writer(s)	Producer(s)	Length
1.	"Intro"			0:07
2.	"Welcome to the Hood"	Dedrick D'Mon Rolison; Andrew Price II; Jimmy Tucker; Kelly Garmon; Cousteau	Leslie Brathwaite	4:34
3.	"L.A. Fo Ya"	Rolison; Price II; Tucker; Garmon; Cousteau; Treyvon Green	Young Trey	3:45
4.	"Everyday" (featuring Lil' Jon)	Rolison; Price II; Garmon; Cousteau; David Keith Williams III; Jonathan H. Smith	Lil' Jon	4:38
5.	"Get Yo Ride On" (Skit)			0:17
6.	"Hittin' Switches"	Rolison; Price II; Tucker; Garmon; Cousteau	Young Trey	3:34
7.	"We Ain't Playin"	Rolison; Price II; Tucker; Garmon; Cousteau	Young Trey	4:04
8.	"Pimpin Ken" (Skit)			1:05
9.	"Please"	Rolison; Price II; Tucker; Garmon	Leslie Brathwaite	4:03
10.	"Pay Back"	Williams III	Rashad Coes	3:32
11.	"Put It Down"	Rolison; Price II; Tucker; Garmon; Cousteau	Young Trey	3:07
12.	"What You Gone Do?" (featuring Ice Cube)	Williams III; O'Shea Jackson	Young Trey	3:47
13.	"Life as a Gangsta" (featuring Birdman and TQ)	Rolison; Price II; Tucker; Garmon; Cousteau; Williams III; Timothy Mosley	Timbaland	4:30
14.	"Nobody Hoo Bangin' Style" (featuring Timbaland)	Rolison; Price II; Tucker; Garmon; Cousteau; Mosley	Timbaland	5:03
Total length:				46:06

== Charts ==
Chart (2002)	Peak position
US Billboard 200	40
US Top R&B/Hip-Hop Albums (Billboard)	9
US Independent Albums (Billboard)	2
