= Soft White =

Studio album by Mack 10
- Released: September 29, 2009
- Recorded: 2008–09
- Genre: West Coast hip hop; gangsta rap
- Length: 46:09
- Label: Hoo-Bangin'; Fontana
- Producer: DJ Green Lantern; Don Vito; Dow Jones; Ervin "EP" Pope; Fingazz; Fredwreck; Honorable C.N.O.T.E.; Mike City; SouthBoy; Young Tre

Mack 10 chronology
Hustla's Handbook (2005)	Soft White (2009)	Money Music (2011)

Singles from Soft White
- 1. "Big Balla" Released: September 23, 2008; 2. "So Sharp" Released: July 7, 2009; 3. "Mirror, Mirror" Released: September 15, 2009

Professional ratings
Review scores
Source	Rating
AllMusic	3.5/5 stars
HipHopDX	3/5

Soft White is the eighth solo studio album by American rapper Mack 10. It was released on September 29, 2009, through Hoo-Bangin' Records with distribution via Fontana. The album was produced by Don Vito, Ervin "EP" Pope, DJ Green Lantern, Dow Jones, Fingazz, Fredwreck, Honorable C.N.O.T.E., Mike City, SouthBoy, and Young Tre, with Roland Pole and Mack 10 serving as executive producers. It features guest appearances from Glasses Malone, Akon, Anthony Hamilton, Birdman, Jazze Pha, J. Holiday, Lil Wayne, Red Café, and Rick Ross. The album debuted at number 141 on the Billboard 200, selling 3,900 copies.

The first single, "Big Balla" featuring Birdman and Glasses Malone was released September 23, 2008, but due to its lackluster reviews and chart performance it was used as a promotional single instead. "So Sharp" featuring Jim Jones and Lil Wayne was set to be a single and was released through iTunes on April 14, 2009, but Jim Jones' label did not clear his name to be used on the album. In an effort to keep the song as his first single, Mack 10 changed the lineup, adding Rick Ross and Jazze Pha. The lead single "So Sharp" featuring Lil' Wayne, Rick Ross and Jazze Pha became available for digital download on July 7, 2009.

== Track listing ==
No.	Title	Producer	Length
1.	"Big Balla" (featuring Birdman and Glasses Malone)	Ervin "EP" Pope	4:11
2.	"So Sharp" (featuring Lil' Wayne, Rick Ross and Jazze Pha)	Don Vito	4:08
3.	"Hoo-Bangin' II" (featuring Glasses Malone)	Dow Jones	3:04
4.	"Mirror, Mirror"	Fredwreck	3:33
5.	"Hood Famous" (featuring J. Holiday)	Fingazz	3:07
6.	"It's Your Life" (featuring Anthony Hamilton)	Ervin "EP" Pope	3:55
7.	"Street Shit" (featuring Glasses Malone)	Mike City	4:03
8.	"Clack Clack" (featuring Akon and Red Café)	DJ Green Lantern	3:30
9.	"Pushin'"	Young Tre	4:19
10.	"Tonight"	SouthBoy	3:49
11.	"Dedication (To the Pen)"	Honorable C.N.O.T.E.	3:59
12.	"Dope Boy"	Don Vito	4:26
Total length:			46:09

== Charts ==
Chart (2009)	Peak position
US Billboard 200	141
US Independent Albums (Billboard)	21
