= Express Yourself =

Express Yourself may refer to:

- Express Yourself (album), a 2004 album by Erik van der Luijt
- "Express Yourself" (Charles Wright & the Watts 103rd Street Rhythm Band song), 1970, from the album of the same name
- "Express Yourself" (Labrinth song), 2012
- "Express Yourself" (Madonna song), 1989
- "Express Yourself" (N.W.A song), 1989
- "Express Yourself", a song from the 2012 EP by Diplo featuring Nicky da B
- "Express Yourself", a song by Danny Brown released ahead of his 2013 album Old
