= Hoo-Bangin' Records =

American record label

- Parent company: EMI
- Founded: 1996
- Founder: Mack 10
- Distributor: Priority Records
- Genre: Hip-hop
- Country of origin: United States
- Location: 6430 Sunset Boulevard, Los Angeles, California, U.S.

Hoo-Bangin' Records is a record label founded by Dedrick "Mack 10" Rolison in 1996. Its name is derived from the namesake song by his group Westside Connection, which was released that same year. The label operated as an imprint of Priority and Capitol Records until 2000, and later Fontana Distribution after the label's 2011 re-launch.

== History ==
=== 1996 — 1999 ===
On October 6, 1998, Mack 10 released his third studio album, The Recipe. A top 15 charting album on the U.S. Billboard 200, the album went on to be certified Gold by the RIAA. It was the lone release from Hoo-Bangin' that year.

=== 2011 - Present ===
In 2011, it was announced that Mack 10 has revived Hoo Bangin'. Mack has signed a new distribution with Fontana, and revealed that he has a new lineup of respected veteran MCs, most notably Xzibit. The platinum artist Xzibit will be joined by his former Strong Arm Steady band-mate Mitchy Slick, Oakland's Richie Rich, Glasses Malone and former Snoop Dogg group, The LBC Crew - with includes original Hoo Bangin' MC Techniec.

The first release for Hoo Bangin' would be Mack 10 and Glasses Malone's collaborative release, Mack/Malone, on April 12. The long-delayed release will be Glasses' first retail album, while his Universal/Cash Money solo debut, Beach Cruiser released August 30.

In a statement, Mack 10 said the following: "The Mack/Malone project is the perfect way to let folks know that Hoo Bangin' is coming back strong. We have been working really hard to make this release a memorable project for our fans. I want Hoo Bangin' to become the home of the best on the west."

In August, Mack 10 re-signed Los Angeles quintet the Young Hoggs. The group worked extensively on Mack's 2003 project, Ghetto, Gutter & Gangsta. Reports that the Hoggs' debut album, The Hottest Around, will features appearances by Julio G, Dre'sta tha Gangsta and Big Wy of The Relativez.

== Discography ==
1998

- Mack 10 - The Recipe

1999

- CJ Mac - Platinum Game
- C.O.G. - Chilldrin of da Ghetto
- MC Eiht - Section 8
- Various Artists - Hoo-Bangin':The Mixtape, Vol. 1
- Various Artists - Thicker than Water (soundtrack)

2000

- The Comrads - Wake Up & Ball
- Mack 10 - The Paper Route
- MC Eiht - N' My Neighborhood

2002

- Da Hood - Da Hood

2003

- Mack 10 - Ghetto, Gutter & Gangsta
- Westside Connection - Terrorist Threats

2005

- Mack 10 - Hustla's Handbook

2009

- Mack 10 - Soft White

2011

- Mack & Malone - Money Music
- Glasses Malone - Beach Cruiser

== Roster ==
=== Current artists ===
- Mack 10
- Glasses Malone
- Ya Boy
- Richie Rich
- The LBC Crew (Bad Azz, Techniec, Lil' C-Style)
- Mitchy Slick

=== Former artists ===
- Allfrumtha I (Binky Mack & Squeak Ru)
- Bad Azz
- CJ Mac
- The Comrads (Gangsta & K-Mac)
- Da Hood (Cousteau, Deviossi, K-Mac, Mack 10, Skoop Delania & Techniec)
- MC Eiht
- Red Café
- Road Dawgs (G-Luv & Swamp Rat)
- Techniec
- Westside Connection (Mack 10, WC & Ice Cube)
- Xzibit
- Soultre' (Nanci Fletcher, Mia Bell, Indira Tyler)

== Film Production ==
- Thicker than Water (1999)
- WWF Aggression
  - Entrance themes.
