= Allfrumtha I =

American rap duo

- Binky Mack & Squeak Ru

Background information
- Origin: Inglewood, California, U.S.
- Genres: West Coast hip hop; gangsta rap
- Years active: 1995–present
- Labels: Hoo-Bangin'; Priority
- Members: Binky Mack; Squeak Ru
- Website: https://web.archive.org/web/20110207130512/http://allfrumthaimusic.com/

Allfrumtha I was an American rap duo from Inglewood, California that consisted of rappers Binky Mack and Squeak Ru. They first appeared together on Westside Connection's 1996 debut album, Bow Down. Before dropping their self-titled debut album on Priority Records in 1998, they appeared together on several Priority Records soundtracks and compilations, including: The Substitute, West Coast Bad Boyz II, Big Thangs, Gang Related, Straight Outta Compton: N.W.A 10th Anniversary Tribute, and Thicker Than Water.

== Background ==
Binky Mack and Squeak Ru picked up that creative perspective from Westside Connection, the West Coast supergroup composed of Ice Cube, Mack 10 and WC. After their impressive work on Bow Down, Allfrumtha I was signed by Mack 10 to his then-fledgling Hoo-Bangin' Records, and in 1998 released its self-titled debut album. The album peaked at number 168 on the Billboard 200, at number 6 on the Billboard Top Heatseekers and at number 32 on the Billboard Top R&B/Hip-Hop Albums. Along with singles, music videos were released for the songs: "County Jail", and "Fill My Cup (To the Rim)", making the duo one of the West Coast's hottest new groups.

In 2001, Allfrumtha I returned with Uncut and then took some time off before reconvening in 2004 to work on another album. "We've been going through a music phase, seeing what was going on and listening to everybody else," Binky Mack explains. "We were listening to some of the music that wasn't hot and decided to get back on. During the layoff, I was just doing beats and listening to other people's music. We were studying the game."

In 2008, Squeak Ru released his debut solo album, Fatworld, on The Oglio Entertainment Group. The album features guest performances by Ice Cube, MC Eiht, Damani and G-Luv.

== Trivia ==
Squeak Ru was a member of the Inglewood Neighborhood Piru Bloods.

== Discography ==
=== Studio albums ===
- Allfrumtha I (1998)
- Uncut (2001)
- Larger Than Life (2005)

=== Video albums ===
- Road Kings (2003)

=== Extended plays ===
- Theme Frum ThaBlack Hole (2014)

=== Solo projects ===
- Binky Mack – Held Hostage (EP) (2007)
- Squeak Ru – Fatworld (2008)
- Squeak Ru – Digital Fatworld (2008)
- Binky Mack – The Black Republican Mixtape (2012)

=== Guest appearances ===
- 1996: "Hoo-Bangin' (WSCG Style)" (from the Westside Connection album Bow Down)
- 1996: "Danger" (from the Priority Records soundtrack The Substitute)
- 1997: "Got Tha Best Hand" (from the No Limit Records compilation West Coast Bad Boyz II)
- 1997: "Fien" (from the Ant Banks album Big Thangs)
- 1997: "Mack 10 Mack 10" (from the Mack 10 album Based on a True Story)
- 1997: "Get Yo Bang On" (from the Death Row Records soundtrack Gang Related)
- 1997: "Westside Connect OG's" (from The Comrads album The Comrads)
- 1998: "The Players Anthem" (from the Ghostt album Ghostt)
- 1998: "Parental Discretion Iz Advised" (from the N.W.A album Straight Outta Compton: N.W.A 10th Anniversary Tribute)
- 1998: "Make Room" (from the Bombay compilation The Golden Bay)
- 1999: "Make You Dance (Joker Dream Team Remix)" (from the Aphrodite compilation Urban Jungle)
- 1999: "Ain't No Love" (from the DJ U-Neek compilation album, Ghetto Street Pharmacist)

== Filmography ==
- 1999 : Thicker Than Water
