= The Comrads =

American gangsta rap duo

- Origin: Lynwood, California
- Genres: West Coast hip hop
- Years active: 1996–2000
- Labels: Street Life; Hoo-Bangin'
- Members: K-Mac; Gangsta

The Comrads was American gangsta rap duo from Lynwood, California, composed of Kelly "K-Mac" Garmon and Terrell "Gangsta" Anderson. The pair made a major splash in the Los Angeles area in the summer of 1997 with the single "Homeboyz" from their self-titled debut album. The duo signed with Mack 10's Hoo-Bangin' Records and released their sophomore studio album Wake Up & Ball in 2000.

After the group split, K-Mac joined Mack 10's supergroup Da Hood to release Mack 10 Presents da Hood in 2002. Gangsta has released his solo album Penitentiary Chances via Heat Rocc Entertainment in 2003.

== Discography ==
=== Albums ===
Year	Title	Chart positions	
Year	Title	Billboard 200	Top R&B/Hip-Hop Albums
1997	The Comrads	113	33
2000	Wake Up & Ball	153	28

=== Singles ===
Year	Title	Chart positions	Album
Year	Title	Hot 100	Album
1997	"Homeboyz"	102	The Comrads
1997	"Die Hard"	—	The Comrads
1997	"Get at Me (Call Me)"	—	The Comrads

=== Guest appearances ===
List of non-single guest appearances, with all performing artists, showing year released and album name
Title	Release	Performers	Album
"Hoo-Bangin' (WSCG Style)"	1996	Westside Connection, AllFrumTha I	Bow Down
"Mack 10, Mack 10"	1997	Mack 10, AllFrumTha I	Based on a True Story
"Hoo-Ride 'N'"	1998	AllFrumTha I, Boo Kapone, CJ Mac, WC	AllFrumTha I
"Parental Discretion Iz Advised"	1998	AllFrumTha I, Boo Kapone	Straight Outta Compton: N.W.A 10th Anniversary Tribute
"Addicted to Crime"	1998	Bad Azz	Word on tha Streets
"Bang or Ball"	1998	Mack 10, AllFrumTha I, Road Dawgs	I Got the Hook-Up soundtrack
"Thugz"	2000	Mack 10	Romeo Must Die soundtrack
"And Ahh"	2001	AllFrumTha I, MC Eiht	Uncut
