= Thicker than Water (1999 film) =

1999 film directed by Richard Cummings Jr.

- Theatrical release poster
- Directed by: Richard Cummings Jr.
- Written by: Ernest Nyle Brown
- Produced by: Andrew Shack; Darryl Taja
- Starring: Mack 10; Fat Joe; MC Eiht; Kidada Jones; Big Pun; Ice Cube
- Cinematography: Robert Benavides
- Edited by: Danny Rafic
- Music by: Tyler Bates; Quincy Jones III
- Production companies: First Write Productions; Hoo-Bangin'; Marsmedia; Priority Films
- Distributed by: Palm Pictures
- Release date: October 29, 1999
- Running time: 91 minutes
- Country: United States
- Language: English

Thicker than Water is a 1999 American crime drama film directed by Richard Cummings Jr. and starring a host of rappers and urban entertainers such as Fat Joe, Mack 10, Ice Cube, MC Eiht, and Big Pun. The film showcases rappers from both the East and the West Coast, as it was made after the end of the East Coast-West Coast feud.

== Plot ==
In Los Angeles, two rival gang leaders are also trying to be music producers. When DJ's (Mack 10) equipment shorts out and Lonzo (Fat Joe) is cut out of the action by a record producer, the two join forces, which also requires a tentative peace between gangs. With backing from Gator (CJ Mac), a smooth New Orleans drug king, DJ and Lonzo start drug dealing, organizing their gangs into pushers. Just as their finances are looking up, one of Gator's team pulls a double cross and two of DJ and Lonzo's gang bangers start a shooting war. Can the erstwhile music producers salvage anything of their bond or their plans?

== Cast ==
- Mack 10 as Darius "DJ" Stone
- Fat Joe as Charles "Lonzo" Medina
- Ice Cube as Fred "Slink" Stone
- MC Eiht as Lil' Ant
- CJ Mac as Gator
- Big Pun (as Big Punisher) as Punny
- K-Mack as Tyree
- Tom'ya Bowden as Leyla
- Kidada Jones as Brandy
- Krayzie Bone as Man on Plane
- Flesh-N-Bone as Man on Plane
- Bad Azz as Badass
- B-Real

== Soundtrack ==
A soundtrack containing hip hop music was released on October 5, 1999, by Priority Records. It peaked at #64 on the Billboard 200 and #8 Top R&B/Hip-Hop Albums. It spawned a single in "Let It Reign" by Westside Connection.
