= Mack 10 =

American rapper (born 1971)

- Born: Dedrick D'Mon Rolison; August 9, 1971 (age 55); Inglewood, California, U.S.
- Education: Inglewood High School
- Genres: West Coast hip-hop; gangsta rap
- Occupations: Rapper; songwriter; actor; record producer; record executive
- Works: Mack 10 discography
- Years active: 1992–present
- Labels: Fontana; Hoo-Bangin'; Capitol; Universal; Cash Money; Priority
- Formerly of: Da Hood; Westside Connection
- Spouse: Tionne Watkins (m. 2000; div. 2004)
- Children: 4

Dedrick D'Mon Rolison (born August 9, 1971), known professionally as Mack 10, is an American rapper, songwriter, record producer, and record executive. He was a member of hip hop supergroup Westside Connection along with WC and Ice Cube and has sold nearly 11 million records between his solo and group works. His stage name is a reference to the Ingram MAC-10 submachine gun. As a record executive, Mack 10 is the founder and CEO of Hoo-Bangin' Records.

== Early life ==
Mack 10 was born and raised in Inglewood, California, and attended Inglewood High School.

== Career ==
Mack 10 made his first appearance on Ice Cube's Bootlegs & B-Sides compilation on the track "What Can I Do? (Remix)".

His debut album Mack 10 was released in 1995 by Priority Records and was certified Gold by the RIAA. The album included the hit single, "Foe Life," which peaked at number 33 on the Billboard 200. His next release Based On A True Story (1997) also reached Gold certification.

On October 6, 1998, Mack 10 released his third studio album, The Recipe. The album debuted at number 15 on the Billboard 200 and went on to be certified Gold.

Rolison appeared with WC and Ice Cube in the 1996 all-star side project Westside Connection, and formed his own production company, Mack One-O, which signed the acts Allfrumtha I and The Comrads. He also signed Glasses Malone to his Hoo-Bangin Records imprint through Cash Money Records.

His most recent album, 2009's Soft White was released by Hoo-Bangin' Records and Fontana Distribution. The first single was "Big Balla" featuring Birdman and Glasses Malone.

== Feuds ==
Mack 10 was involved in several feuds. His critically acclaimed self-titled album included the song "Westside Slaughterhouse" featuring the rapper Ice Cube, which was a diss in response to the song "I Used to Love H.E.R." by Common. In 1996, as a member of the rap supergroup Westside Connection, he was featured in the song "King of the Hill" - a diss song directed at the rap group Cypress Hill.

== Personal life ==
Rolison married Tionne "T-Boz" Watkins, from R&B trio TLC during August 2000. In October 2000, their daughter, Chase Anela Rolison, was born. They separated in 2004.

== Discography ==
Studio albums

- Mack 10 (1995)
- Based on a True Story (1997)
- The Recipe (1998)
- The Paper Route (2000)
- Bang or Ball (2001)
- Ghetto, Gutter & Gangsta (2003)
- Hustla's Handbook (2005)
- Soft White (2009)

Collaborative albums

- Bow Down (with Westside Connection) (1996)
- Da Hood (with Da Hood) (2002)
- Terrorist Threats (with Westside Connection) (2003)
- Money Music (with Glasses Malone) (2010)

== Tours ==
- Up In Smoke Tour (co-act)

== Filmography ==
=== Film ===
| Year | Title | Role | Notes |
|---|---|---|---|
| 1997 | I'm Bout It | Perry's Cousin | |
| 1999 | Thicker than Water | DJ | |
| 2002 | Random Acts of Violence | Lynch | |
| 2003 | Cutthroat Alley | Brian Stokes | |
| 2005 | Apocalypse and the Beauty Queen | D.K. | |
| 2006 | It Ain't Easy | Mack | Video |
| 2011 | Budz House | Himself | |
| 2012 | The Obama Effect | William | |

=== Television ===
| Year | Title | Role | Notes |
|---|---|---|---|
| 1997 | The Jamie Foxx Show | Himself | Episode: "Westside" (with Westside Connection) |
| 1997-99 | Soul Train | Himself | Recurring Guest |
| 2001 | Dark Angel | Tacoma Bleed | Episode: "Out" |
| 2003 | Mad TV | Himself | Episode: "Collins" |
| 2015 | Unsung | Himself | Episode: "DJ Quik" |

=== Video game ===
| Year | Title | Role |
|---|---|---|
| 2004 | Def Jam: Fight for NY | Himself |

=== Documentary ===
| Year | Title |
|---|---|
| 1997 | Rhyme & Reason |
| 2000 | Up in Smoke Tour |
| 2003 | Beef |
| 2004 | Beef II |
| 2005 | Letter to the President |
| 2006 | Dropped |

== Video game appearances ==
Mack 10 is a playable character in the video game Def Jam: Fight for NY.
