= Priority Records =

American record label

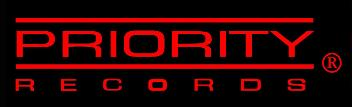
- Parent company: Universal Music Group
- Founded: 1985; 41 years ago
- Founder: Bryan Turner; Mark Cerami; Steve Drath
- Status: Active
- Distributor: Interscope Capitol Labels Group
- Genre: Various, with a focus on hip-hop
- Country of origin: United States
- Location: 6430 Sunset Boulevard, Los Angeles, California, U.S.
- Official website: priorityrecords.com

Priority Records is an American distribution company and record label known for artists including N.W.A, Eazy-E, Ice Cube, MC Ren, Dr. Dre, Master P, Snoop Dogg, Jay-Z, C-Murder, 504 Boyz, Mos Def, Silkk the Shocker, Paris, Mack 10, Brotha Lynch Hung, Mia X, Westside Connection, Skrilla and Ice-T. It also distributed hip-hop record labels including Death Row Records, Hoo-Bangin' Records, No Limit Records, Posthuman Records, Rap-A-Lot Records, Rawkus Records, Roc-A-Fella Records, Ruthless Records Duck Down Records, and Wu-Tang Records. According to Billboard, "few record labels were as important to the rise of West Coast hip-hop as Priority Records".

== Company history ==
=== Beginnings (1985–1996) ===
The Los Angeles-based company (with no ties or relations to a previous Priority Records label that was a subsidiary of what was then CBS Records) was formed in 1985 by three former K-tel executives: Bryan Turner, Mark Cerami and Steve Drath. Initial funding was provided by R-tek, a company headed by former K-tel board members: Ray and Harold Kives, and their company took an initial 50% ownership in Priority. Priority bought out the R-tek interest in 1987.

Its first success came with novelty act the California Raisins. To support early operations, Priority Records licensed repertoire from others and released compilation albums using archive recordings while developing its own artist roster. Priority Records achieved success as an independent label by developing a precedent-setting "street-based" formula of underground marketing which bypassed mainstream radio. This approach allowed Priority to sell millions of records without entering into the fiercely competitive major label battles over radio airplay. Priority's strategic marketing team was developed by Vice President Alyssa Pisano, who led Priority's Marketing and Creative Services Department between 1987 and 1996. Priority's roster featured numerous gold, platinum and multi-platinum artists, including N.W.A, Ice Cube, MC Ren, Eazy-E, Master P, Snoop Dogg, Silkk the Shocker, Jay-Z, Paris, Mack 10, 504 Boyz, Brotha Lynch Hung, C-Murder, Mia X, Westside Connection, No Limit and Ice-T.

Priority distributed rapper Jay-Z's debut album, Reasonable Doubt, in June 1996 with Jay-Z's company Roc-A-Fella Records. The album was a critical success, but a minor success upon release, selling 43,000 copies in its first week and 420,000 copies altogether. It was ultimately certified Platinum by the RIAA. Reasonable Doubt was Roc-A-Fella and Jay-Z's only album with Priority Records.

=== EMI acquisition (1996–2004) ===
In the early 1990s, the label struck up a distribution deal with EMI, while continuing to operate independently. EMI bought a 50% stake in Priority in 1996, and the remainder in 1998.

In 1997, Priority released the I'm Bout It soundtrack by No Limit Records. The album was a critical and commercial success, debuting and peaking in the top 5 on the Billboard 200. It sold 300,000 copies in its first week and was certified platinum by the RIAA. It featured the hit single Pushin' Inside You by Priority/No Limit act Sons of Funk.

In June 1998, Priority and No Limit released Master P's seventh studio album, MP Da Last Don. Promoted as Master P's final album and heavily anticipated, it sold over 495,000 copies in its first week, debuting atop the Billboard 200. The album featured guest appearances from Priority/No Limit artists Snoop Dogg, Sons of Funk, and Silkk the Shocker. MP Da Last Don went on to sell over 4.5 million copies in America, being certified quadruple platinum by the RIAA. That October, Priority released Mack 10's third studio album, The Recipe. A top 15 charting album on the U.S. Billboard 200, the album went on to be certified Gold by the RIAA. The Recipe featured guest appearances from Priority artists Master P and Snoop Dogg.

In January 1999, Priority and No Limit released Silkk the Shocker's album, Made Man, which debuted and peaked at No. 1 on the U.S. Billboard 200. The album was certified Platinum by the RIAA.

Despite EMI's full ownership, Priority continued to be an independently managed company until 2001, when its operations were merged into EMI's major U.S. subsidiary, Capitol Records. Priority was absorbed into Capitol Records in 2004 and ceased operations.

=== Relaunch (2006–2013) ===
In late 2006, EMI revived Priority Records, and it was supposed to start releasing new records again but never did except for a couple compilation and greatest hits albums from the likes of N.W.A, Westside Connection, Mack 10, and Ice Cube. In 2009, Snoop Dogg was appointed creative chairman of the label; Priority released Snoop Dogg's tenth studio album, Malice N Wonderland on December 8, 2009. In July 2013, Priority was re-launched via a joint venture between Capitol Records and Insurgency Music. Based at the Capitol Records Building in Los Angeles, the new Priority Records was a producer centric label that focused on a broader array of music genres, including electronic music as well as urban music. The lone release under Priority's first relaunch was Snoop Dogg's Malice n Wonderland, which was a commercial failure. Following this, Priority remained dormant.

=== Second relaunch (2015–) ===
In 2015, due to the success of the 2015 American biographical film Straight Outta Compton based on former Priority act N.W.A, Priority Records was relaunched one more time as a distributor. This time the focus was on new acts, including G Perico, Snoh Aalegra and Jonn Hart. In 2018, Priority Records partnered with TuneGO. Priority Records signed TuneGO Artist, Three Guests and distributed their album, 3G. Priority also signed Massachusetts rap group Bandits The Label and later went on to distribute DtheFlyest debut project "Dope Boy Diaries" which was executive produced by CruufromtheNorth and featured a hit single with rap superstar Lil Baby titled "Fugazi" (2018).

== Artists ==
- Former Priority Records artists

== Associated labels ==
- Hoo-Bangin' Records, founded by Mack 10
- No Limit Records, founded by Master P. The label's roster included Master P and Silkk the Shocker.
- Roc-A-Fella Records, founded by Kareem Burke, Damon Dash, and Jay-Z. Roc-A-Fella's lone release with Priority was Jay-Z's 1996 debut album, Reasonable Doubt.
- Ruthless Records.
- Rawkus Records.

== See also ==
- List of record labels
- Priority Records discography
