= MC Ren discography =

Hip hop recording artist discography

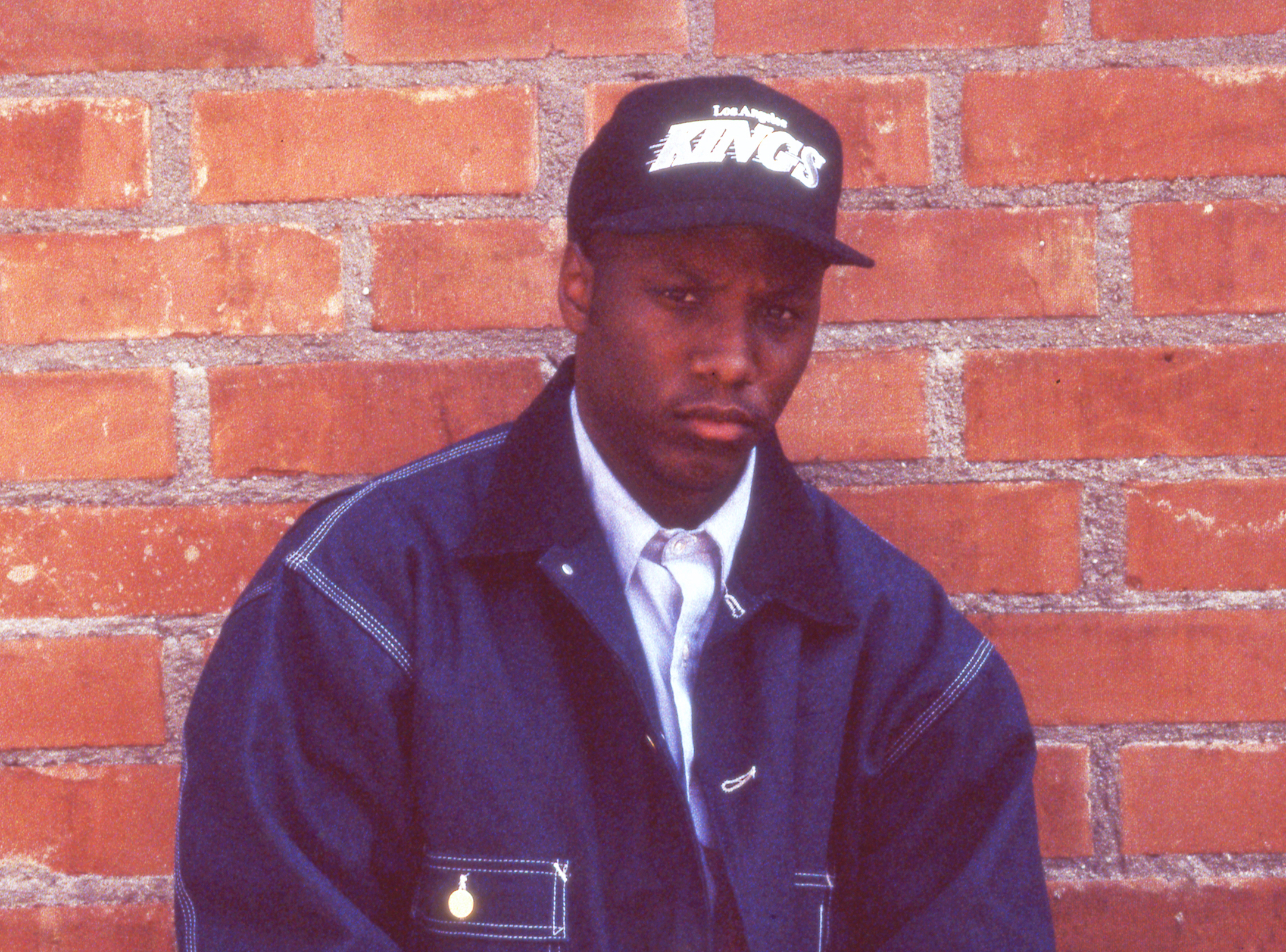
- MC Ren in 1990
- Studio albums: 4
- Extended plays: 2
- Soundtrack albums: 3
- Singles: 21
- Music videos: 8

The discography of American rapper MC Ren Consists of four studio albums, three collaborative albums, two extended plays, 58 singles (including 44 as a featured artist) as well as three movie soundtracks.

== Albums ==
=== Studio albums ===
List of studio albums, with selected chart positions, sales figures and certifications
Title	Album details	Peak chart positions		Sales	Certifications
Title	Album details	US	US R&B	Sales	Certifications
Shock of the Hour	Released: November 16, 1993; Label: Ruthless, Relativity; Format: CD, LP, cassette, digital download	22	1	US: 553,000	
The Villain in Black	Released: April 9, 1996; Label: Ruthless, Relativity; Format: CD, LP, cassette, digital download	31	7	US: 321,000	
Ruthless for Life	Released: June 30, 1998; Label: Ruthless, Epic; Format: CD, LP, cassette, digital download	100	14	US: 170,000	
Renincarnated	Released: October 31, 2009; Label: Villain; Format: Digital download	—	—	US: 3,000	

== Extended plays ==
List of extended plays, with selected chart positions, sales figures and certifications
Title	EP details	Peak chart positions		Sales	Certifications
Title	EP details	US	US R&B	Sales	Certifications
Kizz My Black Azz	Released: June 30, 1992; Label: Ruthless, Priority; Format: CD, LP, cassette, digital download	12	10	US: 1,406,000	RIAA: Platinum
Lost in the Game	Released: April 11, 2009; Label: Villain Entertainment; Format: Digital download	—	—		
Osiris	Released: June 3, 2022; Label: Boomdocz Productions; Format: Digital download	—	—		

== Singles ==
=== As lead artist ===
Year	Song	Peak chart positions			Album
Year	Song	US	US R&B	US Rap	Album
1992	"Final Frontier"	—	80	17	Kizz My Black Azz
1993	"Mayday On The Frontline"	—	—	—	CB4 soundtrack
1993	"Same Ol' Shit"	90	62	11	Shock of the Hour
1994	"Fuck What Ya Heard"	—	—	—	Shock of the Hour
1996	"Mad Scientist"	—	—	—	The Villain in Black
1996	"Keep It Real"	—	106	43	The Villain in Black
1998	"Ruthless for Life"	115	61	13	Ruthless for Life
1998	"Comin' After You" (featuring Ice Cube)	—	—	—	Ruthless for Life
1998	"Who in the Fuck" (featuring 8Ball & MJG)	—	—	—	Ruthless for Life
2009	"Renincarnated"	—	—	—	Renincarnated
2009	"Showtime"	—	—	—	Renincarnated
2014	"Rebel Music"	—	—	—	Rebel Music
2014	"Burn Radio Burn" (featuring Redd Tha Rsonist)	—	—	—	Rebel Music
2019	“King Villain”	—	—	—	King Villain

=== As featured artist ===
Year	Song	Peak chart positions			Album
Year	Song	US	US R&B	US Rap	Album
1988	"We Want Eazy" (Eazy-E featuring Dr. Dre and MC Ren)	—	43	7	Eazy-Duz-It
1990	"We're All in the Same Gang" (with The West Coast Rap All-Stars)	35	10	1	We're All in the Same Gang
1990	"Ballad of a Menace" (CPO featuring MC Ren)	—	—	—	To Hell and Black
1995	"Tha Muthaphukkin' Real" (Eazy-E featuring MC Ren)	—	—	—	Str8 off tha Streetz of Muthaphukkin Compton
2000	"Hello" (Ice Cube featuring Dr. Dre and MC Ren)	—	50	—	War & Peace Vol. 2 (The Peace Disc)
2003	"The Shit" (The D.O.C. featuring 6Two, Ice Cube, MC Ren & Snoop Dogg)	—	—	—	Deuce
2012	"Have Dat Money Rite" (Tha Chill featuring MC Ren)	—	—	—	Chillafornia
"—" denotes a recording that did not chart or was not released in that territory.

== Guest appearances ==
Year	Song	Artist(s)	Album
1988	"Ruthless Villain"	Eazy-E	Eazy-Duz-It
1988	"2 Hard Mutha's"	Eazy-E	Eazy-Duz-It
1989	"Comm. 2"	The D.O.C.	No One Can Do It Better
1989	"The Grand Finale"	The D.O.C. featuring N.W.A	No One Can Do It Better
1990	"Gangsta Melody"	CPO	To Hell and Black
1990	"The Last Song"	Above the Law featuring N.W.A	Livin' Like Hustlers
1993	"Process of Elimination (Untouchakickamurdaqtion)"	Above the Law	Black Mafia Life
1994	"Eyes of the Storm"	Street Soulga featuring Da Konvicted Felon	Life Threatnin Of The Dawn Dead
1995	"Down Fa Mine"	Kam featuring Dresta	Made in America
1996	"Killaz In The Park"	Above the Law	Time Will Reveal
1996	"Who Wanna Be The Villain"	MC Ren	Original Gangstas soundtrack
1998	"Stallion"	Yukmouth featuring Tech N9ne	Thugged Out: The Albulation
1999	"Gansta P.O.V."	Bigg Nastee	My Life, Dreams & Feelings
1999	"Some L.A. Niggaz"	Dr. Dre featuring Defari, Hittman, Xzibit, Knoc-Turn'al, Time Bomb, King T & Kokane	2001
2000	"Set It Off"	Snoop Dogg featuring Ice Cube, Nate Dogg & The Lady of Rage	Tha Last Meal
2001	"The Hardest Muthafuckas"	Kurupt featuring Xzibit, Nate Dogg	Space Boogie: Smoke Oddessey
2001	"Bangin'"	Ms. Toi	That Girl
2001	"Legend of Jimmy Bones"	Snoop Dogg featuring RBX	Bones soundtrack
2001	"Southland Killers"	Cypress Hill featuring King T	Stoned Raiders
2002	"Wanna Ride"	WC featuring Ice Cube	Ghetto Heisman
2002	"Got Ta Hussle"	Ant Banks featuring MC Ren	The N.W.A Legacy, Vol. 2
2003	"Westside Driveby"	DJ Kay Slay featuring E-A-Ski, Kam & MC Ren	The Streetsweeper, Vol. 1
2003	"The Villain and the Homie Down"	Down AKA Kilo featuring MC Ren	California Cowboys
2003	"The Format"	E-A-Ski featuring MC Ren & Boss Hogg	Past And Present: Unlimited Edition Mixtape
2004	"We Roll Deep"	3 Way Funk featuring Fat Joe & MC Ren	3 Way Funk
2006	"F!ck Your Fine Ass B*%ch"	Mitchy Slick featuring MC Ren & DJ Crazy Toones	Live From Da Gutter soundtrack
2006	"Raw Shit"	Public Enemy & Paris featuring MC Ren	Rebirth of a Nation
2006	"Hard Truth Soldiers"	Public Enemy & Paris featuring Dead Prez, The Conscious Daughters & MC Ren	Rebirth of a Nation
2006	"Still Ain't Free"	Paris featuring MC Ren	Paris presents Hard Truth Soldiers, Vol. 1
2006	"Roll On Em"	DJ Crazy Toones featuring MC Ren, Xzibit, Young Maylay & WC	CT Experience
2010	"Intro"	Concrete Crminialz featuring MC Ren	Concrete Criminal Gang
2010	"Have Dat Money Rite"	Tha Chill featuring MC Ren	Chillafornia
2012	"11th Hour"	E-A-Ski featuring MC Ren & Boss Hogg	Summer Music Watch

== Music videos ==
=== As lead artist ===
Year	Song	Director
1992	"Final Frontier"	Marty Thomas
1993	"Mayday On The Frontline"	Marty Thomas
1993	"Same Ol' Shit"	
1994	"Fuck What Ya Heard"	Marty Thomas
1996	"Mad Scientist"	
1996	"Keep It Real"	John Troxtel
1998	"Ruthless For Life"	David Meyers
1998	"Who in the Fuck"	

=== As featured artist ===
Year	Title	Artist	Director
1989	Straight Outta Compton	N.W.A.	Rupert Wainwright
1989	Express Yourself	N.W.A.	Rupert Wainwright
1989	We Want Eazy	Eazy-E	
1990	We're All in the Same Gang	West Coast Rap All-Stars	
1990	Ballad Of A Menace	CPO	
1990	100 Miles And Runnin'	N.W.A.	
1991	Appetite for Destruction	N.W.A.	
1991	Alwayz Into Somethin'	N.W.A.	
1991	Approach To Danger	N.W.A.	
1997	Gotsa Chill	Bigg Rocc	
2000	Hello	Ice Cube	
2006	Roll One Em	DJ Crazy Toones	
2010	Have Dat Money Rite	Tha Chill	

=== Cameo appearances ===
Year	Title	Artist	Producer
1988	Eazy-Er Said Than Dunn	Eazy-E	John Lloyd Miller, Director
1988	We Want Eazy	Eazy-E	John Lloyd Miller, Director
1989	Big Payback	EPMD	
1989	It's Funky Enough	The D.O.C.	
1989	The D.O.C. and the Doctor	The D.O.C.	
1990	Murder Rap	Above the Law	
1990	Untouchable	Above the Law	
1990	This Beat Is Funky	CPO	
1992	Explanation Of A Playa	Penthouse Players Clique	
1993	Call It What You Want	Above the Law	
1995	Just Tah Let U Know	Eazy-E	
1998	Black Nigga Killa	Eazy-E	
