= Yo-Yo discography =

- Studio albums: 4
- EPs: 1
- Singles: 11

The following is the discography of Yo-Yo, an American hip-hop musician.

== Albums ==
=== Studio albums ===
List of studio albums, with selected chart positions
Title	Album details	Peak chart positions	
Title	Album details	US	US R&B /HH
Make Way for the Motherlode	Released: March 19, 1991; Label: East West; Formats: CD, LP, Cassette, digital download	74	5
Black Pearl	Released: June 23, 1992; Label: East West; Formats: CD, Cassette, digital download	145	32
You Better Ask Somebody	Released: June 22, 1993; Label: East West; Formats: CD, LP, Cassette, digital download	107	21
Total Control	Released: October 29, 1996; Label: East West; Formats: CD, LP, Cassette, digital download	—	46
"—" denotes a recording that did not chart or was not released in that territory.

=== Unreleased albums ===
- Ebony (1998)

== EPs ==
List of extended plays
Title	EP details	Track listings
Hits Revealed: Yo Yo	Released: December 18, 2007; Label: Music World; Formats: Digital download	Track listing: 1. "I Did It for Us"; 2. "Gangsta" (featuring Kurupt); 3. "Fire Dept."; 4. "Whatcha Drinkin On"; 5. "Slow Jamz"; 6. "Hold You Down"; 7. "Pink Panties"; 8. "Be the One"

== Singles ==
=== As lead artist ===
List of singles, with selected chart positions
Title	Year	Peak chart positions			Album
Title	Year	US	US R&B	US Rap	Album
"Stompin' to Tha 90's"	1990	—	—	2	Make Way for the Motherlode
"You Can't Play With My Yo-Yo" (featuring Ice Cube)	1991	36	11	1	Make Way for the Motherlode
"Ain't Nobody Better"	1991	—	30	4	Make Way for the Motherlode
"Girl, Don't Be No Fool"	1991	—	—	—	Make Way for the Motherlode
"Home Girl Don't Play Dat"	1992	—	53	3	Black Pearl
"Black Pearl"	1992	—	74	11	Black Pearl
"IBWin' With My CREWin"	1993	— (Note: "IBWin' With My CREWin'" did not enter the Billboard Hot 100, but peaked at number 8 on the Bubbling Under Hot 100.)	—	1	You Better Ask Somebody
"The Bonnie And Clyde Theme" (featuring Ice Cube)	1993	72	37	1	You Better Ask Somebody
"West Side Story'"	1993	—	—	14	You Better Ask Somebody
"Give It T'um"	2009	—	—	—	Non-album single
"Out of Control" (featuring Patient Picasso, Brittany B. and Tyeler Reign)	2019	—	—	—	Non-album single
"—" denotes a recording that did not chart or was not released in that territory.

=== Featured singles ===
List of featured singles, with selected chart positions
Title	Year	Peak chart positions					Album
Title	Year	US Hot 100	US Dance	US R&B	US Rap	UK	Album
"Get The Fist" (As part of Get The Fist Movement)	1992	—	—	—	—	—	Non-album single
"Romantic Call" (Patra featuring Yo-Yo)	1994	55	21	35	9	—	Queen of the Pack
"Stomp (The Remixes)" (Quincy Jones featuring Melle Mel, Coolio, Yo-Yo, Shaquille O'Neal, & The Luniz)	1994	—	1	—	—	28	Q's Jook Joint

=== Promotional singles ===
List of singles, showing year released and album name
Title	Year	Album
"Same Ol' Thang (Everyday)"	1996	Total Control
"Steady Risin"	1996	Total Control
"One For The Cuties" (featuring MC Lyte)	1996	Total Control
"Iz It Still All Good? (Something's On Your Mind)" (featuring Gerald Levert)	1998	—N/a
"Do You Wanna Ride" (featuring Kelly Price)	1998	—N/a
"Push"	1999	—N/a

=== Miscellaneous appearances ===
- 1990 – "It's a Man's World" (with Ice Cube) (AmeriKKKa's Most Wanted)
- 1991 – "Debbie B. ft. Yo Yo - Pack Your Bags
- 1991 – "Mama Don't Take No Mess" (Boyz in the Hood SDTK)
- 1992 – "Get the Fist" (with B-Real, Ice Cube, J-Dee, Kam, King Tee, MC Eiht, Threat) (VA - Get the Fist Movement)
- 1993 – "Romantic Call" (with Patra) (Queen of the Pack)
- 1994 – "I Wanna Be Down (Remix)" (with Brandy, MC Lyte & Queen Latifah) (Baby CD SINGLE)
- 1994 – "Sweet on You" (with Teena Marie) (Passion Play)
- 1995 – "Freedom (Theme From Panther)" (with VA) (Panther SDTK)
- 1995 – "Stomp" (with Coolio, Luniz, Melle Mel, Shaquille O'Neal) (Q's Jook Joint)
- 1995 – "Crazay" (VA - Pump Ya Fist)
- 1996 – "I Can't Take No More" (Girls Town SDTK)
- 1997 – "Keep on Pushin'" (ft MC Lyte, Bahamadia, Nonchalant) (Dangerous Ground SDTK)
- 1997 – "True Dat" (with Levert & Queen Pen) (The Whole Scenario)
- 1999 – "Set Trippin'" (with Dresta, I Smooth 7) (VA - Gumbo Roots)
- 2005 – "Mercedes Boy" (B-Side to Mobb Deep's "Get Twisted" 12")
- 2005 – "Only 4 the Righteous" (with 2Pac) (The Rose, Vol. 2)
- 2005 – "Boogie Oogie Oogie" (with Brooke Valentine & Lynden, Moet) (Roll Bounce SDTK)
- 2009 – "Watcha Wan Do" (with DJ Quik, Kurupt & Problem) (BlaQKout)
- 2009 – "Morning Comes" (with Ray J) (Non-Album Track)
- 2010 – "Só Rezo 0.2" (with Nx Zero & Emicida) (Projeto Paralelo)
