= Family Tree (N.W.A album) =

Compilation album by N.W.A
- Released: September 30, 2008
- Genre: Gangsta rap
- Label: Priority Records
- Producer: Dr. Dre . DJ Yella

N.W.A chronology
The Best of N.W.A: The Strength of Street Knowledge (2006)	Family Tree (2008)	Icon (2014)

Family Tree is the final compilation album by American hip-hop group N.W.A. It features 4 of the original 6 members of N.W.A, as well as guest performances by Westside Connection, Snoop Dogg and Xzibit.

== Track listing ==
No.	Title	Album	Length
1.	"Straight Outta Compton" (N.W.A)	Straight Outta Compton	4:15
2.	"Boyz-n-the-Hood" (Eazy-E)	N.W.A. and the Posse	5:14
3.	"Dope Man" (N.W.A)	N.W.A. and the Posse	5:46
4.	"Fuck tha Police" (N.W.A)	Straight Outta Compton	5:14
5.	"We Want Eazy" (Eazy-E)	Eazy-Duz-It	5:01
6.	"Express Yourself" (N.W.A)	Straight Outta Compton	3:57
7.	"It Was a Good Day" (Ice Cube)	The Predator	4:19
8.	"V.S.O.P." (Above the Law)	Black Mafia Life	4:48
9.	"You Can't Play with My Yo-Yo" (Yo-Yo featuring Ice Cube)	Make Way for the Motherlode	3:53
10.	"Foe Life" (Mack 10)	Mack 10	4:13
11.	"It's Funky Enough" (The D.O.C.)	No One Can Do It Better	4:28
12.	"Final Frontier" (MC Ren)	Kizz My Black Azz	4:09
13.	"Regulate" (Warren G featuring Nate Dogg)	Regulate...G Funk Era	4:08
14.	"Bow Down" (Westside Connection)	Bow Down	3:26
15.	"Bitch Please" (Snoop Dogg featuring Xzibit Uncredited Nate Dogg)	No Limit Top Dogg	3:46
16.	"Gangstas Make The World Go Round" (Westside Connection)	Bow Down	4:32
17.	"Lay Low" (Snoop Dogg featuring Master P, Nate Dogg, Butch Cassidy & The Eastsidaz)	Tha Last Meal	3:42
18.	"We Be Puttin' It Down" (Bad Azz featuring Snoop Dogg)	Word on tha Streets	4:21
