= Final Frontier (song) =

1992 single by MC Ren

Single by MC Ren

from the album Kizz My Black Azz
- Released: September 14, 1992
- Recorded: 1992
- Genre: Gangsta rap
- Length: 4:09
- Label: Ruthless, Priority
- Songwriters: Lorenzo Patterson, Bobby Ervin
- Producer: DJ Bobcat

MC Ren singles chronology
"We're All in the Same Gang" (1990)	"Final Frontier" (1992)	"Mayday On The Frontline" (1993)

"Final Frontier" is the solo debut single by MC Ren released from his debut EP, Kizz My Black Azz and his first track released after the breakup of N.W.A. It was released on September 14, 1992, and was produced by Bobby "Bobcat" Ervin of the L.A. Posse. Though the song was only a minor success, making it to 80 on the Hot R&B/Hip-Hop Singles & Tracks and 17 on the Hot Rap Singles, it has arguably become MC Ren's most well known song.

It has also appeared on the compilations, The N.W.A Legacy, Vol. 1: 1988–1998, Ruthless Records Tenth Anniversary: Decade of Game and Family Tree. The songs samples the Boogie Down Productions song, "The Bridge Is Over".

The song features a music video with cameos from Eazy-E, DJ Yella and Capital Punishment Organization.

== Single track listing ==
1. "Final Frontier" (Clean)- 4:10
2. "The Final Frontier" (Uncensored)- 4:09

== Charts ==
Chart (1992)	Peak position
Billboard Hot R&B/Hip-Hop Singles & Tracks	80
Billboard Hot Rap Singles	17
