= Lost in the Game =

Lost in the Game may refer to:

- Lost in the Game (film), a 2005 American drama film
- Lost in the Game (soundtrack), the soundtrack to the 2005 drama film
- Lost in the Game (album), a 2012 album by Kid606
