= Rebel Music =

Rebel Music may refer to:

- Irish rebel music
- Rebel Music (Bob Marley and the Wailers album), 1986
- Rebel Music (Rebel MC album), 1990
- Rebel Music, an album by SkyBlu, 2013
- Rebel Music, a cancelled EP by MC Ren
  - "Rebel Music" (song), the 2014 title song
- "Rebel Music (3 O'Clock Roadblock)", a song by Bob Marley and the Wailers from Natty Dread, 1974
