= Ballad of a Menace =

"Ballad Of A Menace"

Single by Capital Punishment Organization featuring MC Ren

from the album To Hell and Black
- B-side: "Ren's Rhythm"
- Released: 1990
- Genre: West Coast hip hop; gangsta rap
- Length: 4:33; 4:16 (radio edit)
- Label: Capitol Records
- Songwriters: Vincent Edwards; Lorenzo Patterson
- Producers: MC Ren; Young D

Capital Punishment Organization singles chronology
"Ballad of a Menace" (1990)	"This Beat Is Funky" (1990)

MC Ren singles chronology
"We Want Eazy" (1989)	"Ballad of a Menace" (1990)	"We're All in the Same Gang" (1990)

"Ballad of a Menace" is a single by American hip hop group Capital Punishment Organization featuring MC Ren, released in 1990 as the lead single from their debut studio album To Hell and Black, by Capitol Records. The song later appeared in the Grand Theft Auto V in-game radio station West Coast Classics.

The song was written by CPO's rapper Vince 'Lil' Nation' Edwards and N.W.A's rapper Lorenzo 'MC Ren' Patterson, whom also produced the song along with CPO's producer Daron 'Young D' Sapp. It was mixed at Audio Achievements by Donovan "The Dirt Biker" Smith, and mastered at Bernie Grundman Mastering by Brian "Big Bass" Gardner, to propelled the group to mainstream popularity.

The song has its radio edit version shortened from the original 4 minutes 33 seconds to 4 minutes 16 seconds, and an official remix version titled "Ballad Of A Menace (Homicidal Theme Remix)" with its length of 6 minutes 57 seconds.

== Track listing ==
Adapted from Discogs

7", vinyl, promo
No.	Title	Length
1.	"Ballad Of A Menace (Radio Edit)"	4:16
2.	"Ballad Of A Menace"	4:33

CD single, promo
No.	Title	Length
1.	"Ballad Of A Menace (Radio Edit)"	4:16
2.	"Ballad Of A Menace"	4:33
3.	"Ballad Of A Menace (Homicidal Theme Remix)"	6:57

12", vinyl
No.	Title	Length
1.	"Ballad Of A Menace"	4:33
2.	"Ren's Rhythm"	3:30
3.	"Ballad Of A Menace (Homicidal Theme Remix)"	6:57
4.	"Ballad Of A Menace (Radio Edit)"	4:16
5.	"Ren's Rhythm (Radio Edit)"	3:32

Maxi-single, cassette
No.	Title	Length
1.	"Ballad Of A Menace (Radio Edit)"	4:16
2.	"Ren's Rhythm (Radio Edit)"	3:32
3.	"Ballad Of A Menace"	4:33
4.	"Ren's Rhythm"	3:30
5.	"Ballad Of A Menace (Homicidal Theme Remix)"	6:57

== Samples ==
There were three songs sampled in the original track:

- "Joy" as written and performed by Isaac Hayes from his 1973 album Joy (bass samples)
- "Kool Is Back" as written and performed by Funk, Inc. from their debut 1971 self-titled album Funk, Inc. (various samples)
- "I Ain't Tha 1" as written and performed by Ice Cube from N.W.A.'s 3× Platinum 1988 album Straight Outta Compton (vocal and lyrical samples)

"Ballad Of A Menace (Homicidal Theme Remix)" contains samples from the songs:

- "I'm Gonna Love You Just a Little More Baby" as performed by Barry White from his debut studio album I've Got So Much to Give, 1973 (hooks and riffs samples)
- "The Champ" as performed by The Mohawks in 1968 (vocal and lyrical samples)
- "Cramp Your Style" as performed by All the People and Robert Moore in 1972 (hooks and riffs samples)
- "Hook and Sling - Part I" as performed by Eddie Bo in 1969 (vocal and lyrical samples)
- "Bouncy Lady" as written by Donald Hepburn and performed by Pleasure from their debut album Dust Yourself Off, 1975 (hooks and riffs sample)

The song was sampled in the 1994 song "Bad Mutha Fucka" as performed by Mike D Chill
