= The Return of Superfly (soundtrack) =

Return of Superfly (Original Motion Picture Soundtrack)

Soundtrack album by Various artists
- Released: August 13, 1990
- Recorded: 1990
- Genre: West Coast hip hop; soul
- Length: 53:57
- Label: Capitol Records
- Producer: Morey Alexander; Tim Devine; Curtis Mayfield; Michael Ross; Matt Dike; CPO; Def Jef; DJ Pooh; Dr. Dre; King Gizmo; Mellow Man Ace; Tony G; Will Griffin; Bilal Bashir; J.R. Coes; Lenny Kravitz

Professional ratings
Review scores
Source	Rating
Allmusic	3/5 stars

Return of Superfly (Original Motion Picture Soundtrack) is the original soundtrack to Sig Shore's 1990 film The Return of Superfly. It was released on August 13, 1990, via Capitol Records, and consisted of soul music songs by Curtis Mayfield and hip hop tracks by various rappers, including Capital Punishment Organization, Def Jef, Eazy-E, Ice-T, King Tee, Mellow Man Ace, Tone Lōc and Uzi Bros. The soundtrack wasn't much of a success, only making it to 72 on the US Billboard Top R&B/Hip-Hop Albums chart.

The song "Somethin' Like This" originally appeared on the CPO album, To Hell and Black.

== Track listing ==
No.	Title	Writer(s)	Producer(s)	Length
1.	"Superfly 1990" (performed by Curtis Mayfield & Ice-T)	C. Mayfield	Curtis Mayfield; Lenny Kravitz (co.)	4:39
2.	"Eazy Street" (performed by Eazy-E)	A. Young; E. Wright	Dr. Dre	4:28
3.	"Cheeba Cheeba" (performed by Tone Lōc)		Matt Dike; Michael Ross	6:06
4.	"Funky in the Joint" (performed by Mellow Man Ace)	S. Reyes; T. Gonzales	Mellow Man Ace; Tony G	3:51
5.	"On the Real Tip" (performed by Def Jef)	J. Fortson	Matt Dike; Michael Ross; Def Jef; King Gizmo	5:36
6.	"Showdown" (performed by Curtis Mayfield)	C. Mayfield	Curtis Mayfield	4:24
7.	"Forbidden" (performed by Curtis Mayfield)	C. Mayfield	Curtis Mayfield	4:31
8.	"Take You Home" (performed by King Tee)	R. McBride	DJ Pooh; J.R. Coes (co.)	4:18
9.	"There's a Riot Jumpin' Off" (performed by Uzi Bros.)	W. Griffin	Will Griffin	4:24
10.	"Somethin' Like This" (performed by C.P.O.)	V. Edwards; L. Patterson; C. Bobbit; F. Wesley; J. Brown; D. Sapp	CPO	3:37
11.	"Superfly 1990 (Hip Hop Instrumental)" (performed by Curtis Mayfield)	C. Mayfield	Curtis Mayfield; Bilal Bashir (add.)	4:15
12.	"For the Love of You" (performed by Curtis Mayfield)	C. Mayfield	Curtis Mayfield	4:00
Total length:				53:57
