= Comin' After You =

Single by MC Ren featuring Ice Cube

from the album Ruthless for Life
- Released: July 1998
- Recorded: 1998
- Genre: West Coast hip hop; Gangsta rap; Hardcore rap
- Length: 4:17
- Label: Ruthless, Epic
- Songwriters: Lorenzo Patterson, O'Shea Jackson
- Producer: DJ Bobcat

MC Ren singles chronology
"Ruthless For Life" (1998)	"Comin' After You" (1998)	"Who in the Fuck" (1998)

Ice Cube singles chronology
"The World Is Mine" (1997)	"Comin' After You" (1998)	"Pushin' Weight" (1998)

"Comin' After You" is the second single from rapper MC Ren's third studio album, Ruthless for Life. It features former N.W.A bandmember Ice Cube and it is the first time the duo had worked together since the split of N.W.A The song was produced by DJ Bobcat who also produced MC Ren's debut EP, Kizz My Black Azz.

== Track listing ==
1. "Comin' After You" (LP Version)
2. "Comin' After You" (Instrumental)
3. "Comin' After You" (A Capella)
4. "Comin' After You" (Clean Version)
5. "Comin' After You" (Clean A Cappella)
