= Ruthless for Life (song) =

Single by MC Ren

from the album Ruthless for Life
- Released: April 28, 1998
- Recorded: 1998
- Genre: West Coast hip hop; gangsta rap; hardcore rap
- Length: 4:24
- Label: Ruthless, Epic
- Songwriter(s): Lorenzo Patterson
- Producer(s): L.T. Hutton

MC Ren singles chronology
"Keep It Real" (1996)	"Ruthless for Life" (1998)	"Comin' After You" (1998)

"Ruthless for Life" is the first single from rapper MC Ren's third studio album, Ruthless for Life. The song is dedicated to late rapper and former N.W.A. groupmate, Eazy-E. "Ruthless for Life" charted at 13 on the Hot Rap Singles chart and 61 on the Hot R&B/Hip-Hop Singles & Tracks chart. It is produced by L.T. Hutton.

== Track listing ==
=== A-side ===
1. "Ruthless for Life" (LP Version) – 4:22
2. "Ruthless for Life" (LP A Cappella) – 4:02

=== B-side ===
1. "Ruthless for Life" (Clean Radio Edit) – 3:40
2. "Ruthless for Life" (Instrumental) – 4:22

== Charts ==
Chart	Peak position
U.S. Hot R&B/Hip-Hop Singles and Tracks	61
U.S. Hot Rap Singles	13
