= Burn Radio Burn =

Single by MC Ren featuring Redd Tha Rsonist

from the album Rebel Music
- Released: December 29, 2014
- Recorded: 2014
- Genre: Hip hop
- Length: 3:55
- Label: Villain Entertainment; I.M.G.M.I
- Songwriter: Lorenzo Patterson
- Producer: E-A-Ski

MC Ren singles chronology
"Rebel Music (Remix)" (2014)	"Burn Radio Burn" (2014)

Redd Tha Rsonist singles chronology
"What It's Gon Be" (2014)	"Burn Radio Burn" (2014)

"Burn Radio Burn" is a song by American rapper MC Ren. It was released for digital download on December 29, 2014, as the second single from his cancelled EP Rebel Music. The song was produced by E-A-Ski and features Redd Tha Rsonist.

== Track listing ==
- Digital download

No.	Title	Writer(s)	Producer(s)	Length
1.	"Burn Radio Burn"	L. Patterson	E-A-Ski	3:55

== Remix ==
The official remix featuring Public Enemy rapper Chuck D is expected to be released on the future.
