= Ebony (album) =

Studio album by Yo-Yo
- Released: September 29, 1998 (unreleased)
- Recorded: 1997–1998
- Genre: West Coast hip hop
- Length: 43:18
- Labels: East West America; Elektra

Yo-Yo chronology
Total Control (1996)	Ebony (1998)

Professional ratings
Review scores
Source	Rating
Allmusic	2.5/5 stars
The Source	3/5 stars

Ebony is the unreleased fifth studio album by American rapper Yo-Yo. The album was slated for release on September 29, 1998. However, Ebony was shelved due to unlicensed guest appearances from other labels. Promotional CD and cassette copies of the album were printed prior to the album being shelved. As of today, the album remains unreleased.

The unreleased album spawned 2 singles. "Iz It All Still Good?" featured Gerald Levert and was accompanied by a music video. "Do You Wanna Ride?" features Kelly Price and was issued as a promotional single. The single was originally slated to feature Mary J. Blige but she could not be licensed to appear on Yo-Yo's album. Mary's edition appears on an album sampler promotional cassette. Copies of the album were being printed for stores 3 weeks prior to the album's cancelation.

== Track listing ==
1. "Intro"
2. "Countin' Money"
3. "Do You Wanna Ride?" (feat. Kelly Price) [prod. Rashad Smith for Tumblin' Dice]
4. "Iz It All Still Good?" (feat. Gerald Levert)
5. "Get Up (And Do Your Thing)"
6. "Never Gonna Fall Again"
7. "Fantasy"
8. "Let Me Be The One"
9. "Good Girl"
10. "I Would If I Could" (feat. Missy Elliott)
11. "Pass It On" (feat. Big Chan, Nic-Nak, Shorty G, Lady T)

=== Sample credits ===
- "Do You Wanna Ride?" (feat. Kelly Price) contains an interpolation of "Mercedes Boy" by Pebbles and a sample of "Jump to It" by Aretha Franklin.
- "Iz It All Still Good?" (feat. Gerald Levert) contains an interpolation of "Juicy" by The Notorious B.I.G. and a sample and interpolation of "Something's on Your Mind" by D Train.
- "Get Up (And Do Your Thing)" contains an interpolation of "I Know You Got Soul" by Eric B. & Rakim.
- "Fantasy" contains a sample of "Cold Blooded" by Rick James.
- "Pass It On" is a part 2 to the song "Pass It On" from her 1993 album "You Better Ask Somebody."
