= CPO Boss Hogg =

American rapper (1963–2022)

- Also known as: Lil' Nation; CPO
- Born: Vince Edwards; September 9, 1963; Compton, California, U.S.
- Died: January 12, 2022 (aged 58) Compton, California, U.S.
- Genres: Hip hop; gangsta rap
- Occupations: Rapper; songwriter
- Years active: 1989–2022
- Labels: Capitol; Death Row; Priority; Tilted Brimm Entertainment Group, LLC.
- Formerly of: CPO

Vince Edwards (September 9, 1963 – January 12, 2022) professionally known by his stage name CPO Boss Hogg, was an American rapper from Compton, California. He began his career as a founding member of the hip hop group Capital Punishment Organization in 1989 under the moniker Lil' Nation. The group released their only album before splitting up in 1991. Afterwards Edwards continued his career as a solo artist, featuring on several high-profile albums.

== Career ==
In a 2016 interview, Edwards stated George Clinton, Prince, Barry White, Michael Jackson (and The Jackson 5), Chuck D, KRS-One, LL Cool J, MC Ren, Ice Cube, and The D.O.C. as his favorite and influential musicians.

Edwards was discovered by MC Ren, who helped him to make a deal with Capitol Records. Ren also produced C.P.O.'s debut album To Hell and Black and got Eazy and Dre featured in the music video for its lead single "Ballad Of A Menace". Edwards made his guest appearance on the song "Findum. Fuckem, And Flee" from N.W.A's final album. After C.P.O. and N.W.A. had disbanded, Edwards was signed to Death Row Records. He appeared on Above The Rim OST with "Jus So Ya No" and on Murder Was The Case OST with Slip Capone "The Eulogy". Edwards' biggest feature was with Tupac Shakur on the track "Picture Me Rollin" from 'Pac's All Eyez on Me album in 1996. CPO left Death Row for Priority Records and made his guest appearances on Snoop-affiliated Tha Eastsidaz, Bones OST, and The Return of the Regulator.

In 2012, Edwards founded his independent record label Tilted Brimm Entertainment Group, LLC.

Since 2013, CPO Boss Hogg announced that he was working on new material for his sophomore album release titled I, Boss. He dropped his first single off of it, "Your Body Is Hot!", on August 19, 2014. As of 2025, the album remains unreleased.

== Personal life and death ==
Edwards had a daughter named Mikki. In March 2010, Edwards experienced respiratory issues and was diagnosed with congestive heart failure. He died on January 12, 2022, at the age of 58.

== Discography ==
=== Studio albums ===
- To Hell and Black (1990) with Capital Punishment Organization

=== Guest appearances ===
Title	Release	Other artist(s)	Album
"Findum, Fuckum & Flee"	1991	N.W.A	Niggaz4Life
"Slippin' In the West"	1992	Dr. Dre, Kurupt	The Chronic: Re-Lit & From the Vault
"Foo Nay Mic"	1992		The Chronic: Re-Lit & From the Vault
"Niggaz Is Lyke Dat"	1993	Chocolate, Snoop Doggy Dogg, 3-2	Life-N-A-Day
"Picture Me Rollin'"	1996	2Pac, Danny Boy, Syke	All Eyez on Me
"Big Bang Theory"	2000	Tha Eastsidaz, Xzibit, Kurupt, Pinky	Snoop Dogg Presents: Tha Eastsidaz
"It Ain't Nothin' Wrong with You"	2001	Warren G, Mista Grimm, Vic Damone, Latoyia Williams	The Return of the Regulator
"They Lovin' Me Now"	2001	Butch Cassidy	The Return of the Regulator

=== Soundtrack appearances ===
Title	Release	Other artist(s)	Soundtrack
"Somethin' Like This"	1990	Capital Punishment Organization	The Return of Superfly
"Jus So Ya No"	1994	Val Young	Above the Rim
"The Eulogy"	1994	Slip Capone	Murder Was the Case
"This Is My Life"	2001	Kedrick	Bones
