= Villain Entertainment =

American record label

- Founded: 2004; 21 years ago
- Founder: MC Ren
- Distributor(s): INgrooves (In the US); Fontana (In Canada)
- Genre: Gangsta rap
- Country of origin: United States
- Location: Palm Springs, California

Villain Entertainment is a record label, founded by rapper MC Ren, in Palm Springs, California in 2004. The label's focus was gangsta rap genre of West Coast hip hop.

== History ==
Villain Entertainment was formed as a vehicle for releases by MC Ren, after he left Ruthless Records in 1999. After MC Ren's departure from Ruthless Records, the label inherited the rights to all of MC Ren's solo albums, including Kizz My Black Azz, Shock of the Hour, The Villain in Black and Ruthless For Life. However, the rights to four of the albums are now licensed through Empire Distribution and Virgin Records/Universal Music Group (with Kizz My Black Azz being made on Priority) as they appear on streaming services under the Villain Entertainment label.

Although established in 1999, the label remained dormant for a long period until a revival in 2009, with the release of MC Ren's album Renincarnated.

== Artists ==
=== Current acts ===
MC Ren (Founder of label)

== Discography ==
Artist	Album	Release date
MC Ren	Renincarnated	October 31, 2009
MC Ren	Osiris	June 3, 2022
