= Fuck What Ya Heard =

Single by MC Ren

from the album Shock of the Hour
- B-side: "Mayday On The Frontline"
- Released: April 26, 1994
- Recorded: 1993
- Genre: Gangsta rap
- Length: 4:08
- Label: Ruthless, Relativity
- Songwriter(s): Lorenzo Patterson
- Producer(s): Dr. Jam

MC Ren singles chronology
| "Same Ol' Shit" (1993) | "Fuck What Ya Heard" (1994) | "Mad Scientist" (1996) |

"Fuck What Ya Heard", also known by its censored title, "Forget What Ya Heard", is the second single from MC Ren's debut solo album, Shock of the Hour.

== Single track listing ==
=== A-Side ===
1. "Forget What Ya Heard" (Edit)- 4:09
2. "Fuck What Ya Heard" (Album Version)- 4:09

=== B-side ===
1. "Mayday on the Front Line" (Album Version)- 4:26
