= Renincarnated =

Studio album by MC Ren
- Released: October 31, 2009
- Recorded: 2008–2009
- Genre: Gangsta rap
- Length: 36:57
- Label: Villain; Fontana
- Producer: MC Ren (also exec.); Apocolypse; E-A-Ski; MC Ren; Tha Chill

MC Ren chronology
Lost in the Game (2009)	Renincarnated (2009)	Osiris (2022)

Singles from Renincarnated
- 1. "Renincarnated" Released: August 11, 2009; 2. "Showtime" Released: November 8, 2009

Professional ratings
Review scores
Source	Rating
HipHopDX	3/5 stars

Renincarnated is the fourth studio album by American rapper MC Ren. It was released on October 31, 2009, through his own record label Villain Entertainment with distribution via Fontana Distribution.

The album marked MC Ren's comeback after not having released an album in eleven years since 1998's Ruthless for Life (with the exception of the soundtrack EP Lost in the Game that was recorded in 2003–2004 but not released until early 2009). The album was a download-only album, with no physical edition available. It is his first album since he declined a major label deal in 2002 off the back of a series of high-profile appearances on hit albums for Dr. Dre and Ice Cube.

== Commercial performance ==
The album went on to sell 650 digital downloads in its first week after which it sold more than 3,000 digital copies in the US.

== Track listing ==
No.	Title	Producer(s)	Length
1.	"Renincarnated"	Tha Chill	4:20
2.	"Knock'em Out the Box"	Tha Chill	4:08
3.	"Showtime"	Tha Chill	4:10
4.	"Down for Whatever"		3:44
5.	"West Coastin'"		3:30
6.	"Villainist Tales"	Apocolypse	2:59
7.	"Shootin' the Shit a Lil' Bit"		2:50
8.	"Black Star Line"		3:15
9.	"Return of the Villain"	MC Ren	4:06
10.	"V-Funk"	E-A-Ski	4:11

== Singles ==
=== "Renincarnated" ===
- The first single from the Renincarnated album, and the first from MC Ren's label Villain Entertainment. It was on released August 11, 2009, and is his first single since "Who in the Fuck" in 1998.

=== "Showtime" ===
- The second single from Renincarnated was released on November 8, 2009.
