= Total Control (Yo-Yo album) =

Studio album by Yo-Yo
- Released: October 29, 1996
- Recorded: 1995–1996
- Genre: West Coast hip-hop
- Length: 41:54
- Labels: East West America; Elektra; 61898
- Producers: Yo-Yo; DJ Battlecat; Warren G DJ U-Neek

Yo-Yo chronology
You Better Ask Somebody (1993)	Total Control (1996)	Ebony (1998)

Professional ratings
Review scores
Source	Rating
AllMusic	2.5/5 stars
Entertainment Weekly	B+
The Source	3/5 stars

Total Control is the fourth and latest album by the American West Coast hip-hop artist Yo-Yo. It was released on October 29, 1996, via East West America and Elektra Records. The album was produced by Yo-Yo, DJ Battlecat, DJ U-Neek, and Warren G.

The album reached number 46 on the Top R&B/Hip-Hop Albums chart. "Bonnie and Clyde II", a duet with Ice Cube, reached number 37 on the Hot R&B/Hip-Hop Singles & Tracks chart.

== Track listing ==
1. "One for the Cuties" (feat. MC Lyte) - 4:01
2. "Yo-Yo Funk" - 4:17
3. "Bonnie and Clyde II" (feat. Ice Cube) - 3:59
4. "Steady Risin'" - 4:35
5. "Same Ol' Thang (Every Day)" - 3:54
6. "Tré Ride" (feat. MC Breed) - 4:29
7. "Body Work" (feat. Teena Marie) - 4:15
8. "How Can I Be Down" (feat. Ruff Dogg) - 4:09
9. "Thank You, Boo" - 3:32
10. "Yo-Yo's Night" - 4:27

== Charts ==
Chart (1996)	Peak position
US Top R&B/Hip-Hop Albums (Billboard)	46
