= Same Ol' Shit =

Single by MC Ren

from the album Shock of the Hour
- Released: October 29, 1993
- Studio: Echo Sound (Los Angeles, CA)
- Genre: Gangsta rap
- Length: 3:59
- Label: Ruthless
- Songwriters: Lorenzo Patterson; Jesse Lars Jr.
- Producer: Tootie

MC Ren singles chronology
"Mayday On The Frontline" (1993)	"Same Ol' Shit" (1993)	"Fuck What Ya Heard" (1994)

"Same Ol' Shit", sometimes censored as "Same Ol'", is a song written and performed by American rapper MC Ren. It was released on October 29, 1993 via Ruthless Records as the lead single from the rapper's debut solo full-length studio album Shock of the Hour. Recorded at Echo Sound Studios in Los Angeles, it was produced and co-written by Tootie, who utilized samples from "La Di Da Di", "Let's Get It On" and "I Got a Good Thang (And I Ain't Gonna Let It Go)".

In the United States, the song peaked at number 90 on the Billboard Hot 100, number 62 on the Hot R&B/Hip-Hop Songs, number 11 on the Hot Rap Songs and number 25 on the Dance Singles Sales charts. Thus became most successful single chart-wise of MC Ren's solo career, reaching the Billboard Hot 100, his only single to make it to that chart.

== Track listing ==
Promo CD single
No.	Title	Length
1.	"Same Ol'" (Radio Version)
2.	"Same Ol'" (Album Version)

== Personnel ==
- Lorenzo "MC Ren" Patterson – vocals
- Joanette "Badd Newz" Porter – additional background vocals
- Mark "Fingaz" Dixon – keyboards
- Jesse "Tootie" Lars Jr. – producer
- Bob Morse – recording, mixing
- Eric "Eazy-E" Wright – executive producer

== Charts ==
Chart (1993)	Peak position
US Billboard Hot 100	90
US Hot R&B/Hip-Hop Songs (Billboard)	62
US Hot Rap Songs (Billboard)	11
US Dance Singles Sales (Billboard)	25
