= DJ Bobcat =

American producer, songwriter, DJ, artist, and music executive

- Birth name: Bobby Ervin
- Born: 13 December 1967 (age 57); Los Angeles, California, U.S.
- Genres: Hip hop
- Occupation(s): DJ, producer, music executive
- Years active: 1986–present
- Formerly of: L.A. Posse, Uncle Jamm's Army

Bobby Ervin (born December 13, 1967), known professionally as Bobcat or DJ Bobcat, is an American record producer, songwriter, DJ, and music executive. He is perhaps best known for his co-production work on LL Cool J's 1990 single "Mama Said Knock You Out", which won a Grammy Award and remains one of the most popular songs in hip hop.

Ervin has worked with Clive Davis, Russell Simmons, Rick Rubin, Lyor Cohen, Steve Rifkind, Madonna, Guy Oseary, and Jermaine Dupri, among others. Alongside DJ Pooh, he was part of the production outfit L.A. Posse.

== Musical career ==
=== Uncle Jamm's Army ===
Since the early 1980s, DJ Bobcat has been active in the hip hop community. He began his career in Los Angeles DJing for and promoting shows of West Coast music pioneers, DJing for Run–D.M.C., Whodini, Ice-T, Uncle Jamm's Army, and Kurtis Blow, establishing the beginning of the hip hop scene on the West Coast.

At 15 years old, DJ Bobcat didn't own professional equipment and wasn't tall enough to reach the turntables, resulting in him standing on a milk crate to DJ. When he began working with Big Daddy Productions and Uncle Jamm's Army, Ice T's DJ Chris "The Glove" Taylor taught DJ Bobcat how to use the Cerwin Vega Mixer.

Roger Clayton, founder of Uncle Jamm's Army, would fly to the East Coast and pick up the hottest new underground records from various record stores in the city and bring them back to LA. Bobcat and The Egyptian Lover would take those records, play them first and break them at the big Uncle Jamm's Dances, drawing over 15,000 people in the early 1980s.

=== California Catt Crew ===
As a member of the highly publicized Uncle Jamm's Army, Bobcat was in popular demand, being booked months in advance and doing two to six parties every weekend. After being overbooked week after week, he decided to form a crew of DJs similar to Uncle Jamm's Army, but with his signature sound and scratching techniques. He formed the California Catt Crew, which included Bobcat, Battlecat, Dr. Scratch Kat, Wild Cat, Cosmic Cat, Alley Cat, Courageous Cat and Kitty Kat. Bobcat helped book the DJs all around Southern California and gave them tips about the business.

At this time Bobcat recorded a 12-inch single with Tracy Kendrick and Courtney Branch of Total Track Productions, including the Bobcat Song & the California Catt Crew.

=== 1580 KDAY/Mix Masters ===
Bobcat, along with Uncle Jamm's Army, Greg Mack and Jack Patterson, helped pioneer the world's first 24-hour hip hop radio station, 1580 KDAY, changing the entire format of radio, introducing and pioneering the Saturday Night Mix Show and Traffic Jam. At the time, radio was traditional R&B and was playing very little rap. Bobcat thought of the idea, concept and name "Mix Masters" for Greg Mack at 1580 KDAY. The new format caused a national and international domino effect, changing various stations' view of hip hop and subsequently their format.

Uncle Jamm's Army and the Wrecking Crew are the forefathers of West Coast hip hop. The Mix Masters were the next generation.

=== Def Jam/Bigger & Deffer ===
After dominating the West Coast hip hop scene, Bobcat with his crew L.A. Posse flew to New York City and began working with rap mogul Russell Simmons, Lyor Cohen and Def Jam Records, writing and producing tracks for LL Cool J including "I Need Love", "I'm Bad", "Jack the Ripper", "Kanday", "Get Down", "Go Cut Creator Go" and "The Do Wop". The album Bigger and Deffer sold over 3 million copies, and is considered some of LL Cool J's best work.

=== "I Need Love" ===
Bobcat wrote the melody to "I Need Love" when he was 16 years old. It was originally a song titled "Friends By Day, Lovers By Night", Bobcat's version of "Secret Lovers" by Atlantic Starr.

"I Need Love" has been sampled and remade more than any other rap song in history. It has been sampled or replayed by Jermaine Dupri, Usher, Master P, Kris Kross and countless others.

=== Def Jam tour ===
LL Cool J asked Bobcat to go on the now world-famous Def Jam Tour. Bobcat signed on as DJ/music supervisor, and also designed and choreographed LL's stage shows. He toured all over the world, DJing and overseeing the sound and lighting.

The Def Jam Tour was one of the highest-grossing hip hop tours in history, grossing over $20 million in ticket sales worldwide. The tour toured all over the US and Europe, doing huge sold-out shows around the country including at the LA Sports Arena, the Omni in Atlanta and Madison Square Garden in New York. The Def Jam Tour featured Eric B & Rakim, Public Enemy, DJ Jazzy Jeff & The Fresh Prince, Whodini, KRS-One, N.W.A, Salt N Pepa, Kool Moe Dee, Run–D.M.C., Stetsasonic, and LL Cool J, the headline act.

=== Cat Got Ya Tongue ===
In 2022, Bobcat became an Arista recording artist and toured around the country performing his album, Cat Got Ya Tongue, on the same stage with New Edition and Jody Watley.

That same year Bobcat was presented with a proclamation by the Atlanta City Council for making a positive album and being a positive influence and role model for the community.

== Business ventures ==
=== The Foundation ===
Bobcat and his wife Chanel Ervin started a global entertainment agency and strategic marketing firm titled The Foundation. This global network primarily focuses on DJs and producers, and also markets and promotes new and established recording artists.

=== The Digital Record Pool ===
The Digital Record Pool is an online music marketing service and online community for recording artists that has thousands of DJs, MDs, PDs, tastemakers, music lovers, music producers, journalists and bloggers from around the world. Bobcat is the founder/CEO, and says this site and service were created to help new artists and indie labels around the world get maximum exposure.

=== Digital DJ team ===
Bobcat and the Foundation Entertainment Agency launched an international DJ team for the purpose of promoting new music, media, brands, goods and technologies Globally. Bobcat is founder and general manager, His wife, Chanel Ervin, is the President of Marketing.

== Discography ==
List of singles, with selected chart positions and certifications, showing year released and album name
Year	Title	Peak chart positions									Certifications	Album
Year	Title	US	US R&B	US Rap	CAN	FRA	NL	NZ	SWI	UK	Certifications	Album
1990	"Mama Said Knock You Out" (LL Cool J)	17	12	1	—	—	—	47	—	41		Mama Said Knock You Out
1991	"Steady Mobbin'" (Ice Cube)	—	30	3	—	—	—	—	—	—		Death Certificate
1992	"Final Frontier" (MC Ren)	—	80	17	—	—	—	—	—	—		Kizz My Black Azz
"—" denotes releases that did not chart or receive certification.

- Bigger and Deffer (1987)
- K-9 Posse (1988)
- I'm Gonna Git You Sucka (1988)
- Act a Fool (1988)
- Cat Got Ya Tongue (1989)
- Mama Said Knock You Out (1990)
- The Hard Way (1991)
- Death Certificate (1991)
- Black Pearl (1992)
- Kizz My Black Azz (1992)
- 5150: Home 4 tha Sick (1992)
- The Predator (1992)
- Sickinnahead (1993)
- Strictly 4 My N.I.G.G.A.Z. (1993)
- 14 Shots to the Dome (1993)
- Mitsou (1993)
- State Of Emergency: Society In Crisis Vol. 1 (1994)
- Tha Life of a Hoodlum (1995)
- Mista Grimm (1995)
- Str8 off tha Streetz of Muthaphukkin Compton (1996)
- All Eyez On Me (1996)
- Based on a True Story (1997)
- Ruthless for Life (1998)
- Mean Green (1998)
- J.E. Heartbreak (2000)
- Beware of Dog (2000)
- The Exodus (2002)
- Hip Hop Is Dead (2006)
