= Black Pearl (Yo-Yo album) =

Studio album by Yo-Yo
- Released: June 23, 1992
- Recorded: 1991–92
- Studio: Echo Sound (Los Angeles, CA); One Up; 38 Fresh (Los Angeles, CA)
- Genre: West Coast hip-hop
- Length: 38:37
- Label: EastWest
- Producer: DJ Bobcat; DJ Muggs; DJ Pooh; Down Low Productions; Rashad Coes; Sir Jinx

Yo-Yo chronology
Make Way for the Motherlode (1991)	Black Pearl (1992)	You Better Ask Somebody (1993)

Singles from Black Pearl
- 1. "Home Girl Don't Play Dat" Released: May 28, 1992; 2. "Black Pearl" Released: 1992

Black Pearl is the second studio album by American rapper Yo-Yo. It was released on June 23, 1992, through EastWest Records America/Atlantic. The album was produced by DJ Pooh, Sir Jinx, Down Low Productions, DJ Muggs, Rashad Coes, and DJ Bobcat, with Ice Cube serving as executive producer. It peaked at number 145 on the Billboard 200 and number 32 on the Top R&B/Hip-Hop Albums.

The album spawned two singles: "Black Pearl" and "Home Girl Don't Play Dat". "Black Pearl" reached number 11 on the Hot Rap Singles chart and number 74 on the Hot R&B/Hip-Hop Singles & Tracks chart, and "Home Girl Don't Play Dat" peaked at number 3 on the Hot Rap Singles chart and number 53 on the Hot R&B/Hip-Hop Singles & Tracks chart. The song "I Can't Take No More" was included in the Girls Town soundtrack.

== Critical reception ==
Professional ratings
Review scores
Source	Rating
AllMusic	3.5/5 stars
Robert Christgau	A−
Los Angeles Times	3/4 stars
Spin	1/3 marks

AllMusic's Ron Wynn wrote: "Yo-Yo's positive (but not simplistic or naive) messages regarding female sexuality, self-esteem and achievement were grounded in hard raps and thudding beats on this album, still her most complete, and effective production." Robert Christgau commented that "the nervous propulsion and unreleased tension of her funk agitates mind-body-spirit, only to be put right by a voice that's gotten kinder without even thinking about going soft. Advising the downpressed or dissing fools, her lyrics are smarter throughout and stunning on one that makes a battered wife's bizness its own."

== Track listing ==
No.	Title	Writer(s)	Producer(s)	Length
1.	"The No Intro"			0:12
2.	"Home Girl Don't Play Dat"	Yolanda Whitaker; Corey "Deadly Threat" Lloyd; Isaac Hayes	DJ Pooh	2:38
3.	"So Funky"	Whitaker; Roger Troutman	DJ Pooh	3:02
4.	"Black Pearl" (featuring Big Bubba)	Whitaker; David E. Guppy	Down Low Productions	3:10
5.	"Cleopatra"	Whitaker	Down Low Productions	3:46
6.	"It's a Long Way Home"	Whitaker; James Moore; Anthony Wilson; Errol Brown	DJ Muggs	4:36
7.	"You Should Have Listened"	Whitaker	Sir Jinx	4:00
8.	"Woman to Woman"	Whitaker; Johnny Veliotes Jr.	DJ Pooh; DJ Bobcat; Rashad Coes	2:26
9.	"Hoes"	Whitaker; Lloyd; James Alexander; Ben Cauley	DJ Pooh	3:13
10.	"I Can't Take No More"	Whitaker; Anthony Wheaton; Richard Evans; Philip Upchurch; Ric Powell	Sir Jinx	3:39
11.	"A Few Good Men"	Whitaker; Craig Miller; Ellas Otha Bates	DJ Pooh	3:50
12.	"Will You Be Mine"	Whitaker; Hayes	Sir Jinx	4:05
Total length:				38:37

Sample credits

- Track 2 contains a sample from "Joy" by Isaac Hayes from the 1973 album Joy
- Track 3 contains a sample of "Be Alright" by Zapp
- Track 6 contains a sample of "Scratch My Back" by Otis Redding from the 1966 album The Soul Album and "Disco Queen" by Hot Chocolate from the album Cicero Park
- Track 8 contains a sample of "Strawberry Letter 23" by the Brothers Johnson from the 1977 album Right on Time
- Track 9 contains a sample of "Humpin'" by the Bar-Kays from the album Best of the Bar-Kays
- Track 10 contains a sample of "Voices Inside (Everything Is Everything)" by Donny Hathaway from the 1972 album Live
- Track 11 contains a sample of "Hey Jerome" by Bo Diddley from the 1972 album Where It All Began
- Track 12 contains a sample of "Walk from Regio's" by Isaac Hayes from the 1971 album Shaft

== Personnel ==
- Yolanda M. Whitaker – main artist
- Shawn McLemore – background vocals (track 3)
- Frederick Lee Drakeford – featured artist (track 4)
- Marsha McClurkin – additional background vocals (track 4)
- Kymberli Armstrong – background vocals (tracks: 10, 12)
- Joyce Tolbert – background vocals (tracks: 10, 12)
- DeMonica Santiago – background vocals (track 10)
- Shireen Crutchfield – background vocals (track 10)
- Craig A. Miller – background vocals (track 11)
- Torrence Woods – background vocals (track 12)
- Joseph "DJ Wildstyle" Mann – scratches (track 5)
- Mark Jordan – drum programming (track 7), recording engineer (track 3), producer (tracks: 2, 3, 8, 9, 11)
- David Foreman – guitar & bass guitar (tracks: 7, 10, 12)
- Jason White – keyboards (tracks: 7, 10, 12)
- James Perry – bass guitar (track 10)
- Bob Morris – recording engineer (tracks: 2, 11)
- Down Low Productions – mixing & producer (tracks: 4, 5)
- Prince Charles Alexander – recording engineer (tracks: 4, 5)
- Mike Green – recording engineer (track 6)
- Jason Roberts – engineering (track 6)
- Bob Drake – engineering (tracks: 7, 10, 12)
- Darryl Dobson – recording engineer (tracks: 8, 9)
- Lawrence Muggerud – producer (track 6)
- Anthony Wheaton – producer (tracks: 7, 10, 12)
- Bobby Ervin – producer (track 8)
- James Rashad Coes – producer (track 8)
- O'Shea Jackson – executive producer
- Carlton Batts – mastering
- David Provost – photography

== Charts ==
Chart (1992)	Peak position
US Billboard 200	145
US Top R&B/Hip-Hop Albums (Billboard)	32
