= Lost in the Game (soundtrack) =

Soundtrack album by MC Ren
- Released: April 11, 2009
- Recorded: 2003–2004
- Genres: Gangsta rap; hardcore hip hop
- Label: Villain
- Producers: MC Ren; Big Flip

MC Ren chronology
Ruthless for Life (1998)	Lost in the Game (2009)	Renincarnated (2009)

Lost in the Game: The Soundtrack is a soundtrack EP to the 2005 drama film, Lost in the Game. It was released on April 11, 2009, through Villain Entertainment. The film was directed by MC Ren, and the soundtrack was also composed by MC Ren. The music was originally recorded in 2003–2004 but the EP wasn't released until 2009.

== Track listing ==
No.	Title	Performer(s)	Length
1.	"Lost In The Game"	MC Ren	4:19
2.	"Traitour"	MC Ren, Bigg Rocc	5:45
3.	"I'm Back"	MC Ren	5:36
4.	"Gimme My Paper"	MC Ren	3:34
5.	"We Gonna Bang"	MC Ren, Bigg Rocc	5:16
6.	"In House"	MC Ren, Nitetrain	4:52
