= Yo-Yo (rapper) =

American rapper and actress (born 1971)

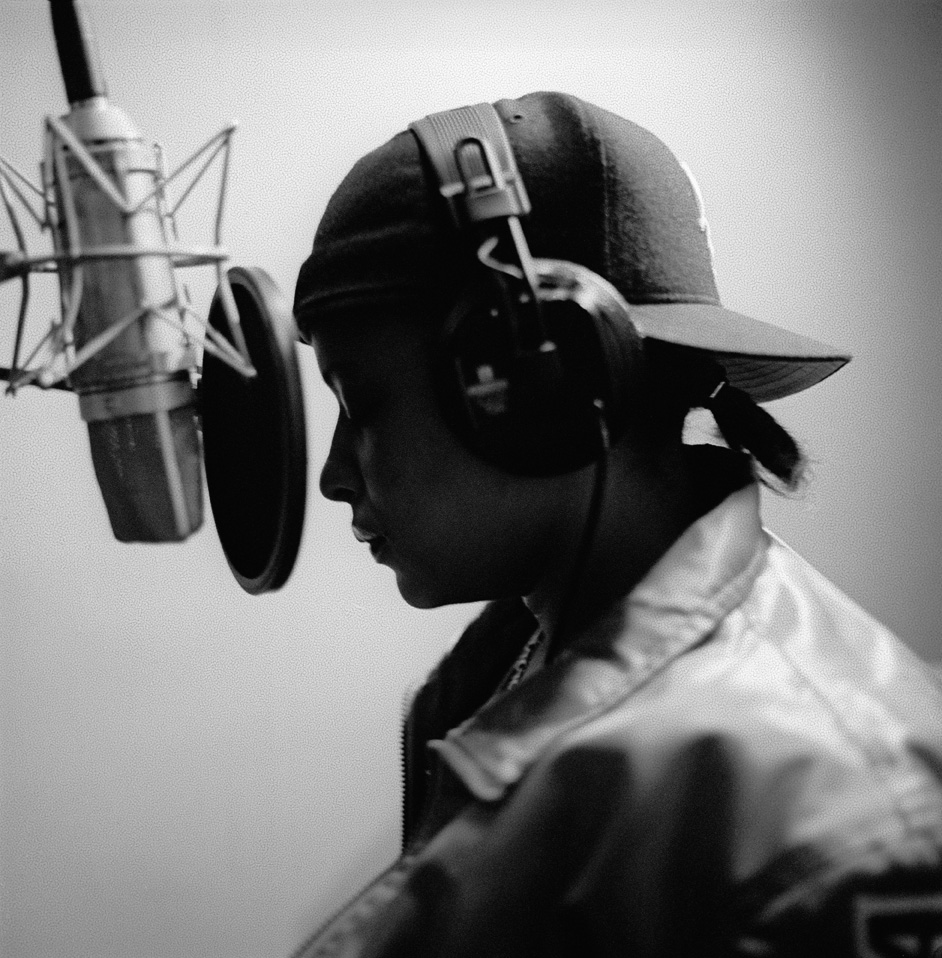
- Yo-Yo in 1997
- Born: Yolanda Whitaker; August 4, 1971 (age 55); Compton, California, U.S.
- Occupations: Rapper; songwriter; actress
- Spouse: DeAndre Windom (m. 2013; div. 2016) Kelvin J King 2024-
- Musical career
- Origin: South Central, Los Angeles, California, U.S.
- Genre: West Coast hip-hop
- Years active: 1989–present
- Label: East West America
- Website: yoyoschoolofhiphop.com

Yolanda "Yo-Yo" Whitaker (born August 4, 1971) is an American rapper and actress from South Los Angeles.

Much of Yo-Yo's music advocates female empowerment. She is the protégée of gangsta rapper Ice Cube. Yo-Yo has dubbed her crew the IBWC, Intelligent Black Women's Coalition. She also performed on a couple of stages with Shock G's group Digital Underground.

== Career ==
=== Music ===
Yo-Yo first appeared as a guest on Ice Cube's 1990 debut studio album AmeriKKKa's Most Wanted on the track "It's a Man's World". Cube returned the favor by appearing on "You Can't Play with My Yo-Yo", on Yo-Yo's 1991 debut album, Make Way for the Motherlode. Each of the videos for the singles from the album were directed by Okuwah Garrett of Power Films.

Her follow-up album released in 1992, Black Pearl, was well received by critics, partly because of its focus on positive messages and uplifting themes that heavily contrasted with the popular gangsta rap style at the time. Despite the work of producers such as DJ Muggs, this failed to translate into a hit with mainstream hip-hop audiences, and the album's sales were considered a disappointment.

Less than a year later, Yo-Yo released her follow-up album, titled You Better Ask Somebody. The final track on the album was her third recorded hip-hop duet with Ice Cube, "The Bonnie and Clyde Theme".

Yo-Yo's next album, Total Control, was released in 1996. In 1998, Yo-Yo finished her fifth studio album, Ebony, though it was not released. In 2008, her single, "You Can't Play With My Yo-Yo" was ranked number 92 on VH1's 100 Greatest Hip-Hop Songs. Later that year, she performed with MC Lyte, The Lady of Rage, and Salt-N-Pepa at the BET Hip Hop Awards. She also performed on the Arsenio Hall show in 1994 alongside many other famous rappers and rap groups. Yo-Yo opened up the show and was later followed by rappers and groups like Naughty by Nature, A Tribe Called Quest and Wu-Tang Clan.

As of 2009, Yo-Yo has been working on an EP, titled My Journey to Fearless: The Black Butterfly.

In 2013, it was announced she joined the upcoming BET reality series Hip Hop Sisters which will focus on six female rappers' lives and their attempts to relaunch their careers. Other rappers confirmed to appear are MC Lyte, Lady of Rage, Monie Love, Lil Mama, and Smooth. Yo-Yo currently hosts a cooking show on the Aspire network "Downright Delicious with Yo-Yo."

=== Acting ===
Yo-Yo appeared in the 1991 film Boyz n the Hood. She had a recurring role on the television show Martin as Keylolo, the sidekick to comedian Martin Lawrence's neighbor (also played by Martin Lawrence) Sheneneh. Yo-Yo also appeared on other TV shows, including the Fox network's New York Undercover. She made a cameo appearance in the music video for Missy Elliot's "The Rain (Supa Dupa Fly)". She also appeared in the action-adventure game Grand Theft Auto: San Andreas (2004) as the voice of Kendl Johnson. She has a reoccurring role in the series Saturdays on Disney Plus starring role as skating rink owner, Duchess.

== Personal life ==
Yo-Yo was in a relationship with fellow rapper Tupac Shakur for a short time in the 1990s. She was with him in the hospital shortly before he died. Later, Yo-Yo became engaged to DeAndre Windom, the former mayor of Highland Park, Michigan, in August 2012. The two married on August 17, 2013 in the Cayman Islands and divorced in 2016.

In November of 2024, Yo-Yo became engaged to Businessman/Real Estate Mogul and Philanthropist Kelvin J King from South Jamaica, Queens New York.

Yo-Yo has been active in advocating for hip-hop artists to become involved within their community. Notably, she testified in 1994 for a Senate Judiciary Committee hearing about whether the government should require rating labels on gangsta rap. She also founded the Yo-Yo School of Hip-Hop to use hip-hop in curriculum for at-risk students. She is an honorary member of Zeta Phi Beta sorority.

== Discography ==
Studio albums

- Make Way for the Motherlode (1991)
- Black Pearl (1992)
- You Better Ask Somebody (1993)
- Total Control (1996)

== Filmography ==
=== Film ===
Year	Title	Role	Notes
1991	Boyz n the Hood	Herself	
1993	Who's the Man?	Woman	
1993	Menace II Society	Girl at Party	
1993	Strapped	Ann	TV movie
1993	Sister Act 2: Back in the Habit	Sondra	
1995	Panther	Pregnant Junkie	
1997	Sprung	Sista No. 3	
1997	Trials of Life	Jennifer	TV movie
1999	The Breaks	Loretha	
1999	Beverly Hood	Tilly	
2000	3 Strikes	Charita	
2001	Longshot	Herself	
2002	Paper Soldiers	Judge Prince	
2006	Da Jammies	Mrs. Mangual (voice)	Short
2006	Waist Deep	Female Radio DJ (voice)	
2016	Janitors	Herself	

=== Television ===
Year	Title	Role	Notes
1992–1998	Soul Train	Herself	Recurring Guest
1993–1995	Martin	Keylolo	Recurring Cast: Season 1 & 3
1995	New York Undercover	Nikki	Episode: "You Get No Respect"
1996	Moesha	Security Guard	Episode: "A Concerted Effort: Part 1"
1997	The Parent 'Hood	Audrey	Episode: "When Robert Met Jerri"
1998	The Jamie Foxx Show	Kierston	Episode: "Passenger 187"
2008	Ego Trip's Miss Rap Supreme	Herself/Co-Host	Main Co-Host
2008	The Greatest	Herself	Episode: "100 Greatest Hip Hop Songs"
2011	Way Black When: Primetime	Herself	Episode: "Episode 1.12"
2014–2022	Unsung	Herself	Recurring Guest
2015	Da Jammies	The Real Rosanne (voice)	Episode: "Old School"
2017	Unsung Hollywood	Herself	Episode: "Tupac Shakur"
2018	Unsolved	Pretty Woman	Episode: "Wherever It Leads"
2019	Love & Hip Hop: Hollywood	Herself	Main Cast: Season 6
2022–2023	Double Cross	Taye	Guest Cast: Season 3–4
2023	Saturdays	Duchess	Recurring Cast
2023	Downright Delicious with Yo-Yo	Herself/Host	Main Host
2026	The Varnell Hill Show	Herself/Musical Guest	Episode: "Spring Chicken"

=== Music videos ===
Year	Song	Artist	Role
1995	2Pac	"Temptations"	Girl in Last Room
1997	Missy Elliott	"The Rain (Supa Dupa Fly)"	Herself

=== Video games ===
Year	Title	Role	Notes
2004	Grand Theft Auto: San Andreas	Kendl Johnson (voice)	
2021	Grand Theft Auto: The Trilogy – The Definitive Edition	Kendl Johnson (voice)	Archival recordings Remaster of Grand Theft Auto: San Andreas only

=== Documentary ===
Year	Title
1999	After Stonewall
2010	The Wordz Project
2010	My Mic Sounds Nice: A Truth About Women and Hip Hop
2011	The Power of Words

== Awards and nominations ==
Year	Award
1995	MTV Video Music Award nomination for Best Rap Video for "I Wanna Be Down" (Remix) (featuring Brandy, MC Lyte and Queen Latifah)
1996	Grammy Award nomination for Best Rhythm & Blues Vocal Performance – Duo or Group for "Stomp"
