= Shock of the Hour =

Studio album by MC Ren
- Released: November 16, 1993
- Recorded: September 1992 – April 1993
- Studios: Echo Sounds (Los Angeles, California); Audio Achievements (Torrance, California)
- Genres: Gangsta rap; political hip hop
- Length: 40:19
- Labels: Ruthless; Relativity
- Producers: Dr. Jam; Madness 4 Real; Tootie; Rhythm D

MC Ren chronology
Kizz My Black Azz (1992)	Shock of the Hour (1993)	The Villain in Black (1996)

Singles from Shock of the Hour
- 1. "Same Ol' Shit" Released: October 29, 1993; 2. "Fuck What Ya Heard" Released: April 26, 1994

Shock of the Hour is the debut solo studio album by American rapper MC Ren. It was released on November 16, 1993, through Ruthless Records and distributed by Relativity Records.

== Background ==
After the success of his debut EP Kizz My Black Azz, a follow-up album was promised for an early 1993 release. The EP, which had gone platinum after two months, was released as a promotion for the upcoming album, to be titled Life Sentence. However, in the middle of the recording of the Life Sentence album, MC Ren suddenly joined the Nation of Islam and converted to Islam with the help of his DJ and friend DJ Train. With a different outlook on the world, MC Ren scrapped the Life Sentence album, changing the name to Shock of the Hour and started to record new songs for the album. However, he kept some previously recorded songs and used them for the first half of the album, while the second half contained songs recorded after he converted to Islam, resulting in thematic differences between the albums' halves, not unlike Ice Cube's 1991 album Death Certificate.

== Content ==
=== Lyrics ===
The first half were songs recorded before MC Ren joined the Nation of Islam. This half deals with social issues like ghetto life, drug addiction, racism and poverty. The lead single, "Same Ol' Shit", strips away any pretense of glamour around the gangsta lifestyle and outlines the brutality, paranoia and violence at its core. The second single, "Fuck What Ya Heard", tells people not to listen to rumors and to be critical on what they hear. Also featured on the album is "One False Move", which is a diss track aimed at Tweedy Bird Loc.

The second half kicks off with "Mayday on the Frontline", which appeared on the soundtrack for the film CB4. "Attack on Babylon" prophesies a judgment day for modern America in which the races will be called to war in armed combat, while the title track foresees the nation's fiery end in an apocalyptic fury enabling black people to finally achieve justice. "Do You Believe" questions black Christianity considering black history and everything that has happened. It also questions interracial relationships.

=== Production ===
The majority of the album's production was handled by Tootie and Dr. Jam. Other producers like Rhythum D and Madness 4 Real produced one song each. Tootie, who is the brother of DJ Train, produced six tracks, while Dr. Jam produced four tracks. The producers managed to create an interesting musical backdrop for Ren's dark verses, operating completely independent of Dr. Dre's G-funk sound that was taking over the West Coast in ‘93. The album moves at a steady midtempo funk with rumbling bass, rough percussion and whiny synths. It's effective in that it's a dark and often powerful sound, but it's also somewhat faceless and industrial-sounding. The beats are focused to the point that a few sound too similar, but overall it is a memorable listen from a musical standpoint.

=== Album title ===
The title of the album is a reference made to a speech by Nation of Islam minister Louis Farrakhan called "The Shock of the Hour".

== Singles ==
Two singles were released from the album: "Same Ol' Shit" and "Fuck What Ya Heard". "Same Ol' Shit was released as the first single on October 29, 1993, and was produced by Tootie. It peaked at number 90 on the Billboard Hot 100, number 62 on the Hot R&B/Hip-Hop Singles & Tracks and number 11 on Hot Rap Singles. "Same Ol' Shit" became MC Ren's most successful single chart-wise, being his only single to appear on the Hot 100.

"Fuck What Ya Heard" was released as the second single on April 26, 1994, and was produced by Dr. Jam. It did not enter any chart, but a music video was shot for the single.

== Release and reception ==
=== Critical reception ===
Professional ratings
Review scores
Source	Rating
AllMusic	4/5 stars
Chicago Sun-Times	3/4 stars
Entertainment Weekly	B−
Los Angeles Times	3/4 stars
RapReviews	8/10
The Source	3.5/5 stars
The Village Voice	D

Shock of the Hour was met with generally positive reviews from music critics. Ron Wynn of AllMusic stated, "M.C. Ren's debut LP is uneven, but at least presents a lyrical vision when it's not spewing out familiar, tired, sexist cliches about women." Entertainment Weekly magazine's James Bernard asserts that "On Shock of the Hour, Ren’s raps still sound as commanding as they did on Niggaz4Life, and the musical production is a pretty decent rendition of Dr. Dre’s patented slow, ominous gangsta funk". Jonathan Gold of Los Angeles Times noted "Shock of the Hour is a small, ugly masterpiece of gangsta rap" and went on to say "Ren’s deep-voiced, brutal rhyming is as menacing, as portentous of violence, as anything a horror-film director ever set up". The Source magazine gave the album a 3.5/5 mic rating. It said aside from Ren's talented flow and menacingly distinctive voice, the album's greatest asset comes with the production.

The album also received some negative criticism. Village Voice critic Robert Christgau gave the album a "Must to Avoid" rating, which signifies "On side one he [Ren] brutalizes black people, especially but by no means exclusively black women, Then to cover his tracks, he turns around and spouts the most ignorant, racist Afrocentric bullshit yet to hit the charts.

=== Commercial performance ===
The album peaked number one on Billboard R&B and number 22 on the Billboard 200 chart, with a first-month sales of 321,000 copies in the United States.

== Track listing ==
No.	Title	Producer(s)	Length
1.	"11:55" (Intro)	Tootie	1:58
2.	"Same Ol' Shit"	Tootie	4:07
3.	"Fuck What Ya Heard"	Dr. Jam	4:08
4.	"All Bullshit Aside"	Dr. Jam; Madness 4 Real (co.)	3:52
5.	"One False Move" (featuring Da Konvicted Felon, Dollar Bill and Don Jaguar)	Tootie	4:43
6.	"You Wanna Fuck Her"	Dr. Jam	4:31
7.	"Mayday on the Frontline"	Dr. Jam	4:27
8.	"Attack on Babylon"	Rhythum D	4:48
9.	"Do You Believe"	Tootie	2:45
10.	"Mr. Fuck Up" (featuring the Whole Click)	Tootie; Juvenile (co.)	3:49
11.	"Shock of the Hour" (featuring Laywiy and Kam)	Tootie	3:56
Total length:			42:59

== Personnel ==
- Lorenzo Jerald Patterson - primary artist, performer, producer
- Craig A. Miller - performer
- Laywiy - performer
- Badd Newz - performer
- Da Konvicted Felon - performer
- Dollar Bill - performer
- Don Jaguar - performer
- The Whole Click - performer
- Dr. Jam - producer, mixing
- Tootie - producer
- DJ Train - producer
- Mark (Fingaz) Dixon - Keyboards (Same Ol')
- René "The Secret Weapon" Flores - Bass
- Eric Lynn Wright - executive producer
- David Weldon - producer
- Juvenile - producer
- Madness 4 Real - producer
- Donovan the Dirt Biker - engineer, mixing
- Bob Morse - engineer, mixing
- David Weldon - engineer
- Daniel Arsenault - photography

== Charts ==
=== Weekly charts ===
Chart (1993)	Peak position
US Billboard 200	22
US Top R&B/Hip-Hop Albums (Billboard)	1

=== Year-end charts ===
Chart (1994)	Position
US Top R&B/Hip-Hop Albums (Billboard)	50

=== Singles ===
Year	Single	Peak chart positions		
Year	Single	U.S. Hot 100	U.S. R&B	U.S. Rap
1993	"Same Ol' Shit"	90	62	11
1994	"Fuck What Ya Heard"	—	—	—

== See also ==
- List of number-one R&B albums of 1993 (U.S.)
