= Rebel Music (song) =

2014 single by MC Ren

Single by MC Ren

from the album Rebel Music
- Released: March 27, 2014
- Recorded: 2014
- Genre: Hip hop
- Length: 3:49
- Label: Villain Entertainment
- Songwriter: Lorenzo Patterson
- Producer: E-A-Ski

MC Ren singles chronology
| "Showtime" (2009) | "Rebel Music" (2014) | "Rebel Music (Remix)" (2014) |

"Rebel Music" is a song by American rapper MC Ren, released on March 27, 2014, as the lead single from his cancelled EP Rebel Music.

== Background ==
Having announced that he was working on his fifth studio album, MC Ren immediately reached out to E-A-Ski for production. The two began collaborating and MC Ren announced that E-A-Ski was going to produce the whole album, including the single. After talking about it for weeks, the single was eventually released on March 27, 2014.

To promote the single MC Ren appeared on several radio shows and did a handful of interviews with magazines and newspapers. Before releasing the single on iTunes, he released it on hiphop magazine DubCNN to give the song a buzz.

The single was met with mostly positive review from both fans and critics. It also received some airplay on many radio stations, including some mainstream airplay.

== Track listing ==
| No. | Title | Writer(s) | Producer(s) | Length |
|---|---|---|---|---|
| 1. | "Rebel Music" | L. Patterson | E-A-Ski | 3:49 |

== Release history ==
| Country | Date | Format | Label | Version |
|---|---|---|---|---|
| United States | March 27, 2014 | Digital download | Villain Entertainment | Original |
| United States | June 9, 2014 | Digital download | Villain Entertainment, I.M.G.M.I | Remix |
