= You Better Ask Somebody =

1993 studio album by hip-hop artist Yo-Yo

Studio album by Yo-Yo
- Released: June 22, 1993
- Recorded: 1992–1993
- Genre: West Coast hip-hop
- Length: 44:31
- Labels: East West America/Atlantic; 92252
- Producers: Ice Cube (exec.); QDIII; Laylaw; the Baker Boys; Derrick McDowell; Mister Woody; Tootie

Yo-Yo chronology
Black Pearl (1992)	You Better Ask Somebody (1993)	Total Control (1996)

Professional ratings
Review scores
Source	Rating
AllMusic	4/5 stars
Christgau's Consumer Guide	A−
The Source	4/5 stars

You Better Ask Somebody is the third studio album by the American West Coast hip-hop artist Yo-Yo. The album was released on June 22, 1993, through East West America and Atlantic Records, and was produced by Ice Cube, N.W.A producer Laylaw, the Baker Boys, Derrick McDowell, Mister Woody, and Tootie. The album peaked at number 107 on the Billboard 200 and number 21 on the Top R&B/Hip-Hop Albums. There were two singles from the album that charted, including "Westside Story", which reached number 14 on the Hot Rap Singles, and "The Bonnie and Clyde Theme", which peaked at the number 1 spot on Hot Rap Singles and featured Ice Cube.

== Track listing ==
No.	Title	Writer(s)	Producer(s)	Length
1.	"IBWin' wit My Crewin'"	Yo-Yo; QDIII	QDIII	3:56
2.	"Can You Handle It?"	Yo-Yo	The Baker Boys; Ice Cube	3:04
3.	"Westside Story"	Ice Cube	Laylaw; Ice Cube; Derrick McDowell	4:53
4.	"Mackstress"	Yo-Yo	Ice Cube; Crazy Toones; QDIII	3:51
5.	"20 Sack"	Yo-Yo	QDIII	3:10
6.	"You Better Ask Somebody"	Yo-Yo	QDIII; Ice Cube	3:28
7.	"They Shit Don't Stink" (background vocals by Ice Cube)	Ice Cube	The Baker Boys; Ice Cube	3:40
8.	"Letter to the Pen" (featuring Martin Lawrence)	Yo-Yo	Tootie; Ice Cube	2:38
9.	"Givin' It Up" (featuring Lil E & Prince Ital Joe)	Yo-Yo; Idle Joe; Lil E	Mr. Woody	3:41
10.	"Pass It On"	Yo-Yo; Nick Nack; Lady T; Chann; Sukii; Shorty; Dawn	Pockets; Ice Cube	4:02
11.	"Girls Got a Gun"	Ice Cube	QDIII; Ice Cube	2:56
12.	"The Bonnie and Clyde Theme" (featuring Ice Cube)	Yo-Yo; Ice Cube; Pockets	Pockets	4:12

Sample credits

- "IBWin' wit My Crewin'" samples "Buckwilin'" performed by Terminator X.
- "Can You Handle It?" samples "Welcome to the Terrordome" performed by Public Enemy.
- "Westside Story" samples "Sir Nose D'Voidoffunk" performed by Parliament.
- "Mackstress" samples "Do That Stuff" performed by Parliament, "Top Billin'" performed by Audio Two and "Sing a Simple Song" performed by Sly and the Family Stone.
- "They Shit Don't Stink" samples "Get Off Your Ass and Jam" performed by Funkadelic and "Stoned Is the Way of Walk" performed by Cypress Hill.
- "Letter to the Pen" samples "Nuthin' but a 'G' Thang" performed by Dr. Dre, "Impeach the President" performed by the Honey Drippers, and "La Di Da Di" performed by Doug E. Fresh and MC Ricky D.
- "Givin' It Up" samples "Just Funnin'" performed by Mtume and "Baby" performed by Cheryl Lynn.
- "Pass It On" samples "Stoned Is the Way of Walk" performed by Cypress Hill, "Poison" performed by Bell Biv DeVoe, and "Give Me Some Emotion" performed by Webster Lewis.
- "Girls Got a Gun" samples "Raw" performed by Big Daddy Kane, "Run Nigger" performed by the Last Poets, and "Shotgun" performed by Los Lobos.
- "The Bonnie and Clyde Theme" samples "Master Rocker" performed by Bernard Wright.

== Personnel ==
Adapted from the album's liner notes.

- Tony Dawsey – mastering (Masterdisk)
- Thomas Bricker – art direction
- Michael Miller – photography
- Lisa Michelle – fashion stylist

== Charts ==
Chart (1993)	Peak position
US Billboard 200	107
US Top R&B/Hip-Hop Albums (Billboard)	21
