= Make Way for the Motherlode =

Studio album by Yo-Yo
- Released: March 19, 1991
- Recorded: 1990–1991
- Genre: West Coast hip-hop
- Length: 43:54
- Label: East West America
- Producers: Ice Cube; Sir Jinx

Yo-Yo chronology
Make Way for the Motherlode (1991)	Black Pearl (1992)

Singles from Make Way for the Motherlode
- 1. "Stompin' to tha 90s" Released: 1990; 2. "You Can't Play with My Yo-Yo" Released: 1991; 3. "Ain't Nobody Better" Released: 1991; 4. "Girl Don't Be No Fool" Released: 1991

Make Way for the Motherlode is the debut studio album by the American West Coast hip-hop musician Yo-Yo. Make Way for the Motherlode was released on March 19, 1991, through East West Records and Atlantic Records. The album was produced by Ice Cube, Sir Jinx, and Del tha Funkee Homosapien. Make Way for the Motherlode peaked at number 74 on the Billboard 200 and number 5 on the Top R&B/Hip-Hop Albums chart. The singles included "You Can't Play with My Yo-Yo" and "What Can I Do?", both of which featured Ice Cube, and "Ain't Nobody Better." The background vocals for "You Can't Play with My Yo-Yo" were sung by MC Soula.

== Critical reception ==
Professional ratings
Review scores
Source	Rating
AllMusic	3.5/5 stars
Robert Christgau	A−
The Source	3.5/5 stars

Robert Christgau commented that: "By loosing Roxanne Shante's tough talk on Queen Latifah's leadership seminar, Ice Cube's no-shit sister doubles her chance of teaching "intelligent black women" how one respects oneself. Her most salient theme is an ass she's not inclined to give up on the first date, and when she succumbs, she lives to regret it at speeds that'll set you on yours. Sir Jinx's soul-thick, jazz-inflected production suits her gritty drawl and wayward mouth. And if they should split she'll figure out another way to get over." The New York Times noted that Yo-Yo is "fast-talking and competitive in the requisite boasts, then slows down the rhymes to detail male transgressions and, more often, female naivete."

Alex Henderson of AllMusic wrote: "As positive as Queen Latifah but as abrasive in her delivery as MC Lyte, Yo-Yo showed some potential on her debut album, Make Way for the Motherlode."

== Track listing ==
All tracks are written by Yo-Yo.

No.	Title	Writer(s)	Length
1.	"Stand Up for Your Rights" (featuring Ricky Harris, Tamika Ingram and Threat)	Yo-Yo; Sir Jinx; Chilly Chill; Stevie Wonder	1:00
2.	"Stompin' to the '90s"	Del; Sir Jinx	4:07
3.	"You Can't Play with My Yo-Yo" (featuring Ice Cube)	Yo-Yo; Ice Cube; James Brown; Charles Sherrell	5:04
4.	"Cube Gets Played" (featuring Ricky Harris)		0:19
5.	"Put a Lid on It"	Ice Cube; Sir Jinx; James Brown	3:04
6.	"What Can I Do?" (featuring Ice Cube)	Del; Ice Cube; Clarence Reid	4:13
7.	"Dedication" (featuring LA Jay & Ricky Harris)	John Barnes III; J-Swift	0:52
8.	"Sisterland"	Yo-Yo; Alvertis Isbell; Bob Crewe; Kenny Nolan	3:38
9.	"The I.B.W.C. National Anthem" (featuring Dawn, Diamond & Sparkles)	Yo-Yo	1:44
10.	"Make Way for the Motherlode"	Del; Ice Cube; George Clinton; Bernie Worrell; Bootsy Collins	3:47
11.	"Tonight's the Night" (featuring Dazzie Dee)	Dazzie Dee; Betty Wright; Willie Clark; Willie Hutchinson	3:38
12.	"I Got Played"	Ice Cube; Sir Jinx	2:45
13.	"Girl, Don't Be No Fool"	Ice Cube; Sir Jinx; the J.B.'s	4:40
14.	"Ain't Nobody Better"	Yo-Yo; Del; Hawk Wolinski; George Clinton; Philippe Wynne	4:22
15.	"Outro" (featuring Ricky Harris)	Del; Ice Cube; Clarence Reid	0:23
16.	"More of What I Can Do" (featuring Sir Jinx)	Del; Ice Cube; Reid	1:48
Total length:			43:54

Notes:

- Some CD editions list the outro with the incorrect running time of 2:10
- Featured artists are not listed

== Charts ==
Chart (1991)	Peak position
US Billboard 200	74
US Top R&B/Hip-Hop Albums (Billboard)	5
