= To Hell and Black =

Studio album by CPO
- Released: August 7, 1990
- Recorded: 1989–1990
- Studio: Audio Achievements (Torrance, California)
- Genres: West Coast hip hop; gangsta rap
- Length: 37:53
- Label: Capitol
- Producers: MC Ren (also exec.); Young D

Singles from To Hell and Black
- 1. "Ballad of a Menace" Released: 1990; 2. "This Beat Is Funky" Released: 1990

Professional ratings
Review scores
Source	Rating
AllMusic	2/5 stars
Select	1/5 medals
The Source	2.5/5 stars

To Hell and Black is the only studio album by American hip hop group Capital Punishment Organization. It was released through Capitol Records on August 7, 1990, and featured its two lead singles "Ballad of a Menace" and "This Beat Is Funky". The album peaked at No. 33 on the Billboard Top R&B/Hip-Hop Albums chart.

Audio production of the album was handled by M.C. Ren with co-production by CPO's Young D.

== Track listing ==
No.	Title	Writer(s)	Length
1.	"Ballad of a Menace" (featuring M.C. Ren)	V. Edwards; L. Patterson; I. Hayes	4:33
2.	"C.P.Osis"	V. Edwards; L. Patterson; D. Sapp	3:15
3.	"Ren's Rhythm"	V. Edwards; L. Patterson; G. Moton; D. Sapp	3:30
4.	"Flow To The Rhythm"	V. Edwards; L. Blackmon; D. Sapp	3:06
5.	"The Wall"	V. Edwards; L. Patterson	4:51
6.	"Homicide"	V. Edwards; C. Lars; L. Patterson; N. Witfield	4:43
7.	"Somethin' Like Dis"	V. Edwards; L. Patterson; C. Bobbit; F. Wesley; J. Brown; D. Sapp	3:36
8.	"The Movement"	V. Edwards; L. Patterson; D. Sapp	3:16
9.	"This Beat Is Funky"	V. Edwards; D. Reeves; J. Spicer; L. Smith; R. Simmons	3:50
10.	"Gangsta Melody" (featuring M.C. Ren)	V. Edwards; L. Patterson	3:13
Total length:			37:53

Samples

- "Ballad Of A Menace" contains samples from
  - "Joy" by Isaac Hayes (1973)
  - "Kool Is Back" by Funk, Inc. (1971)
  - "I Ain't Tha 1" by N.W.A (1988)
- "C.P.Osis" contains samples from
  - "Shaft in Africa (Addis)" by Johnny Pate (1973)
  - "Get Up Offa That Thing" by James Brown (1976)
- "Ren's Rhythm" contains samples from
  - "I Walk On Gilded Splinters" by Johnny Jenkins (1970)
- "Flow To The Rhythm" contains samples from
  - "Funky Drummer" by James Brown (1970)
  - "Save The World" by Southside Movement (1974)
  - "El Shabazz" by LL Cool J (1985)
- "The Wall" contains samples from
  - "Funk Funk" by Cameo (1977)
- "Homicide" contains samples from
  - "Got To Get My Hands On Some Lovin'" by The Undisputed Truth (1975)
  - "Get Three Coffins Ready" from A Fistful of Dollars (1964)
- "Somethin' Like Dis" contains samples from
  - "Rockit" by Herbie Hancock (1983)
  - "Make It Good To Yourself" by James Brown (1973)
  - "La Di Da Di" by Doug E. Fresh and Slick Rick (1985)
  - "Funky President (People It's Bad)" by James Brown (1974)
  - "Funky Drummer" by James Brown (1970)
- "The Movement" contains samples from
  - "I Wouldn't Change A Thing" by Coke Escovedo (1976)
  - "I Know You Got Soul" by Bobby Byrd (1971)
  - "Move The Crowd" by Eric B. & Rakim (1987)
  - "UFO" by ESG (1981)
  - "The Big Beat" by Billy Squier (1980)
- "This Beat Is Funky" contains samples from
  - "Money (Dollar Bill Y'all)" by Jimmy Spicer (1983)
  - "Sucker M.C.'s (Krush Groove 1)" by Run-D.M.C. (1983)
  - "Funky President (People It's Bad)" by James Brown (1974)
- "Gangsta Melody" contains samples from
  - "A Joyful Process" by Funkadelic
  - "Put Your Love (In My Tender Care)" by The Fatback Band (1975)
  - "Papa Was Too" by Joe Tex (1966)

== Personnel ==
- Caroline Greyshock - photography
- Vince Edwards - rap vocals, main artist
- Jerry Heller - management
- Clarence "D.J. Train" Lars - scratches, main artist
- Granville "The Chip" Moton - featured artist (track 3)
- Lorenzo Patterson - producer, featured artist
- Daron "Young D" Sapp - co-producer, main artist
- Donovan "The Dirt Biker" Smith - mixing
- Tommy Steele - art direction
