= The Villain in Black =

Studio album by MC Ren
- Released: April 9, 1996
- Recorded: 1994–1996
- Studios: The Edge (Inglewood, CA); Audio Achievements (Torrance, CA); Cherokee (Los Angeles, CA)
- Genres: Political hip-hop; gangsta rap
- Label: Ruthless
- Producers: Cold 187um; Dr. Jam; Jess "Big Jess" Willard; Madness 4 Real

MC Ren chronology
Shock of the Hour (1993)	The Villain in Black (1996)	Ruthless for Life (1998)

Singles from The Villain in Black
- 1. "Mad Scientist" Released: 1996; 2. "Keep It Real" Released: 1996

Professional ratings
Review scores
Source	Rating
AllMusic	2/5 stars
Billboard	(favorable)
Los Angeles Times	2/4 stars
RapReviews	5.5/10
The Source	3/5 stars

The Villain in Black is the second full-length solo studio album by American rapper MC Ren. It was released April 9, 1996, through Ruthless Records. The recording sessions took place at the Edge Recording Studios in Inglewood, Audio Achievements in Torrance and Cherokee Recording Studio in Los Angeles. The album was produced by Cold 187um, Dr. Jam, "Big Jess" Willard, and Madness 4 Real. It features guest appearances from Above the Law, J-Rocc, Triggaman, and Khalid Abdul Muhammad.

The album debuted at number 31 on the Billboard 200 and number 7 on the Top R&B/Hip-Hop Albums charts, with first-week sales of 31,000 copies. Its lead single, "Mad Scientist", did not make it to the charts. However, the second and final album's single, "Keep It Real", reached number 43 on the Hot Rap Songs chart.

== Background ==
After the release and success of his critically acclaimed debut studio album Shock of the Hour in late 1993, M.C. Ren immediately began working on his sophomore album. The deaths of D.J. Train and Eazy-E would however prove to be a huge setback and Ren stepped off the scene for a while.

Meanwhile, he continued his work with the Nation of Islam and visited Egypt in mid-1995. Following his return from Egypt, M.C. Ren continued to work on his album, this time however scrapping all the material he recorded with DJ Train. Enlisting Cold 187um and Dr. Jam to produce his album, Ren began recording new material.

While making The Villain in Black, M.C. Ren was closely affiliated with the Nation of Islam, which had a large impact on the some parts of the album's content. Black nationalist Khalid Muhammad appeared in the track "Muhammad Speaks", where he spoke about the history of the rights of African Americans. He also made a cameo appearance on the closing track "Bring It On".

== Track listing ==
No.	Title	Writer(s)	Producer(s)	Length
1.	"Bitch Made Nigga Killa"	Lorenzo Patterson; Gregory Hutchinson	Cold 187um
2.	"Keep It Real"	Patterson; Henrik Milling Rasmussen	Dr. Jam
3.	"It's Like That" (featuring J. Rocc)	Patterson; Jerry Brown; Hutchinson	Cold 187um
4.	"Mad Scientist"	Patterson; Rasmussen; Lasse Bavngaard; Rasmus Berg; Jesper Dahl; Peter Nicholas Secher Kvaran	Madness 4 Real; Dr. Jam
5.	"Live from Compton 'Saturday Night'"	Patterson; Hutchinson	Cold 187um
6.	"Still the Same Nigga"	Patterson; Jess Willard	Jess "Big Jess" Willard
7.	"I Don't Give A Damn"	Patterson; Rasmussen; Bavngaard; Berg; Dahl; Kvaran	Madness 4 Real; Dr. Jam
8.	"Mind Blown"	Patterson; Brown; Hutchinson	Cold 187um
9.	"Great Elephant"	Patterson; Willard	Jess "Big Jess" Willard
10.	"Muhummad Speaks" (featuring Khalid Muhammad)	Hutchinson	Cold 187um
11.	"Bring It On" (featuring Above the Law and Triggerman)	Patterson; Hutchinson; Kevin Gulley	Cold 187um

Sample credits

- Track 1 contains a sample from "If It Ain't Ruff" written by Lorenzo Patterson and Andre Young as recorded by N.W.A.

== Personnel ==
- Lorenzo "MC Ren" Patterson – vocals
- Gregory "Cold 187um" Hutchinson – vocals, producer, recording, mixing, arranging
- Jerry "J-Rocc" Brown – vocals
- Kevin "KM.G" Gulley – vocals
- Kervin "Triggaman" Paul – vocals
- Harold "Khalid Abdul Muhammad" Moore Jr. – voice
- Tamara "Tski" Rasmussen – additional background vocals
- Mike "Crazy Neck" Sims – guitar
- Henrik "Doctor Jam" Milling – producer
- Jess "Big Jess" Willard – producer, programming
- Lasse Bavngaard – producer
- Rasmus Ødum Berg – producer
- Jesper "Jokeren" Dahl – producer
- Nicholas "Coldhands" Kvaran – producer
- Mark "The Don" Paladino – recording, mixing
- Donovan "The Dirt Biker" Smith – recording, mixing
- Eric "Eazy-E" Wright – executive producer
- Don Cunningham – art direction, design
- Peter Dokus – photography
- Giulio Costanzo – design, layout
- Madeleine Smith – sample clearance

== Charts ==
Chart (1996)	Peak position
US Billboard 200	31
US Top R&B/Hip-Hop Albums (Billboard)	7
