= We're All in the Same Gang =

Single by The West Coast Rap All-Stars

from the album We're All in the Same Gang
- B-side: "Tellin' Time (Mike's Rap)"
- Released: May 22, 1990
- Genre: West Coast hip hop
- Length: 7:28
- Label: Warner Bros. Records
- Producer: Dr. Dre

Music video
- "We're All in the Same Gang" on YouTube

Professional ratings
Review scores
Source	Rating
Los Angeles Times	3.5/4 stars

"We're All in the Same Gang" is a hip hop song by a collaboration of prominent American West Coast hip hop recording artists under the West Coast Rap All-Stars umbrella, who assembled to promote an anti-violence message. It was released on May 22, 1990 through Warner Bros. Records as the lead single and a title track from the compilation album of the same name. Produced by Dr. Dre, the posse cut features contributions from King Tee, Body & Soul, Def Jef, Michel'le, Tone-Lōc, Above The Law, Ice-T, Dr. Dre, MC Ren, J. J. Fad, Young MC, Digital Underground, Oaktown's 3.5.7, MC Hammer and Eazy-E, with the voice of the news reader in the song's intro was done by then-future World Championship Wrestling announcer Lee Marshall. The song's music video was directed by Ken Andrews.

The single peaked at number 35 on the Billboard Hot 100, number 10 on the Hot R&B/Hip-Hop Songs and topped the Hot Rap Songs chart in the United States. It was certified Gold by the Recording Industry Association of America on September 19, 1990 for selling 500,000 units, and also made it to number 11 on the Official New Zealand Music Chart.

The song was nominated for a Grammy Award for Best Rap Performance by a Duo or Group at the 33rd Annual Grammy Awards, but lost to Quincy Jones, Melle Mel, Ice-T, Big Daddy Kane and Kool Moe Dee's "Back on the Block".

== Track listing ==
"We're All In The Same Gang" (Maxi single)
No.	Title	Writer(s)	Producer(s)	Length
1.	"We're All in the Same Gang" (featuring King Tee, Body & Soul, Def Jef, Michel'le, Tone-Lōc, Above The Law, Ice-T, Dr. Dre, MC Ren, J. J. Fad, Young MC, Digital Underground, Oaktown's 3.5.7, MC Hammer and Eazy-E)	The West Coast Rap All-Stars	Dr. Dre	7:28
2.	"We're All in the Same Gang (Radio Special)" (featuring King Tee, Body & Soul, Michel'le, Tone-Lōc, Ice-T, Dr. Dre, MC Ren, Young MC, Digital Underground and Eazy-E)	The West Coast Rap All-Stars	Dr. Dre	4:15
3.	"Tellin' Time (Mike's Rap)"	Michael Concepcion; George Clinton; William Collins; Bernie Worrell	Dr. Dre; Shock G	4:27

Notes

- In the CD versions of the maxi-single, the 'Radio Special' edition is swapped with the original version of the song. The 'Radio Special' cut version had the verses of Def Jef, Above The Law, J.J. Fad, Oaktown's 3.5.7 and M.C. Hammer removed.

== Personnel ==
- Michael Concepcion – executive producer
- Eban Kelly – executive producer
- Leonard Richardson – executive producer
- Mary Ann Dibs – art direction
- Glenn Parsons – logo design

== Charts ==
Chart (1990)	Peak position
Australia (ARIA Charts)	106
New Zealand (Recorded Music NZ)	11
US Billboard Hot 100	35
US Hot R&B/Hip-Hop Songs (Billboard)	10
US Hot Rap Tracks (Billboard)	1

== Certifications ==
Region	Certification	Certified units/sales
United States (RIAA)	Gold	500,000^{^}
^{^} Shipments figures based on certification alone.
