= Kizz My Black Azz =

EP by MC Ren
- Released: June 30, 1992
- Recorded: 1991–1992
- Studio: Audio Achievements (Torrance, California)
- Genre: West Coast hip-hop; Gangsta rap
- Length: 24:38
- Label: Ruthless; Priority
- Producer: DJ Bobcat; DJ Train; MC Ren; the Torture Chamber

MC Ren chronology
Kizz My Black Azz (1992)	Shock of the Hour (1993)

Singles from Kizz My Black Azz
- 1. "Final Frontier" Released: September 14, 1992

Kizz My Black Azz is the debut extended play by rapper MC Ren, released on June 30, 1992, on Ruthless Records and distributed by Priority Records. Selling over one million copies in the first month, to date, the album has sold 2.2 million copies in the U.S.

== Release and reception ==
Professional ratings
Review scores
Source	Rating
AllMusic	4/5 stars
Entertainment Weekly	B−
Los Angeles Times	3/4 stars
RapReviews	7/10
The Source	3/5 stars

== Track listing ==
All tracks are written by MC Ren.

No.	Title	Producer(s)	Length
1.	"Intro: Check It Out Y'all"	DJ Bobcat	2:01
2.	"Behind the Scenes"	DJ Bobcat; MC Ren	4:37
3.	"Final Frontier"	DJ Bobcat; MC Ren	4:11
4.	"Right Up My Alley"	DJ Bobcat; MC Ren	5:37
5.	"Hounddogz"	The Torture Chamber; DJ Train; MC Ren	4:34
6.	"Kizz My Black Azz"	DJ Bobcat; MC Ren	4:18
Total length:			24:38

== Personnel ==
- Bobby Ervin – producer
- Brian Gardner – mastering
- Dean Karr – photography
- Clarence Lars – producer
- Dino Paredes – art direction, design
- Lorenzo Patterson – main artist, producer
- Mike Sims – bass, guitar
- Donovan Smith – mixing
- Eric Wright – executive producer
- The Torture Chamber – producers

== Charts ==
=== Weekly charts ===
Chart (1992)	Peak position
US Billboard 200	12
US Top R&B/Hip-Hop Albums (Billboard)	10

=== Year-end charts ===
Chart (1992)	Position
US Top R&B/Hip-Hop Albums (Billboard)	58

== Certifications ==
Region	Certification	Certified units/sales
United States (RIAA)	Platinum	1,000,000^{^}
^{^} Shipments figures based on certification alone.
