= Ruthless for Life =

Studio album by MC Ren
- Released: June 30, 1998
- Recorded: 1997–1998
- Studio: Larabee (Los Angeles, CA); Urban House Inc. (Houston, TX); Bad Ass Beat Lab (Oakland, CA); Tha Mutha Ship (Chocolate City); Sound Castle Recording (Los Angeles, CA); Redzone (Burbank, CA); Clear Lake Audio (North Hollywood, CA); Ameraycan Studio (North Hollywood, CA); Echo Sound Recording Studio (Glendale, CA)
- Genre: West Coast hip-hop; gangsta rap; hardcore hip-hop
- Length: 50:10
- Label: Ruthless; Epic
- Producer: Alan "Byrd" Tatum; Ant Banks; DJ Bobcat; DJ Raw Steele; Larry Johnson; L.T. Hutton; tha Chill; T-Mix; Touch Tone; Young Tre

MC Ren chronology
The Villain in Black (1996)	Ruthless for Life (1998)	Lost in the Game (2009)

Singles from Ruthless For Life
- 1. "Ruthless for Life" Released: April 28, 1998; 2. "Comin' After You" Released: July 1998; 3. "Who in the Fuck" Released: 1998

Ruthless for Life is the third solo full-length studio album by American rapper MC Ren. It was released on June 30, 1998, through Ruthless Records with distribution via Epic Records. The recording sessions took place at Larrabee and Sound Castle Recording in Los Angeles, Urban House Inc. in Houston, Badass Beat Lab in Oakland, Tha Mutha Ship in Chocolate City, Redzone in Burbank, Clear Lake Audio and Ameraycan Studio in North Hollywood and Echo Sound Recording Studio in Glendale. The album was produced by T-Mix, Ant Banks, L.T. Hutton, Alan "Byrd" Tatum, DJ Bobcat, Larry Johnson, Raw Steele, tha Chill, Touchtone, and Young Tre. It features guest appearances from 8Ball & MJG, Big Rocc, Ice Cube, Peeps, RBX, Snoop Dogg, and tha Chill.

The album debuted at number 100 on the Billboard 200 and number 14 on the Top R&B/Hip-Hop Albums charts in the United States. Its lead single, "Ruthless for Life", peaked at number 15 on the Bubbling Under Hot 100, number 35 on the Hot R&B/Hip-Hop Singles Sales, number 61 on the Hot R&B/Hip-Hop Songs and number 13 on the Hot Rap Songs charts.

== Critical reception ==
Professional ratings
Review scores
Source	Rating
AllMusic	4/5 stars
Los Angeles Times	3/4 stars
The Source	3/5 stars
XXL	4/5 (XL)

Upon its release, Ruthless for Life received mostly positive reviews from music critics. Stephen Thomas Erlewine of AllMusic thought the album gives MC Ren "the opportunity to sound like a contemporary rather than a washed-up veteran", but added that "all of his ideas are a little shopworn". Soren Baker, in a review for Los Angeles Times, praised both the album's lyrics and its production, calling Ruthless for Life MC Ren's best work to date. Miguel Burke of The Source thought the album had some "monumental moments", where MC Ren "successfully updates the formula", but criticized the album's production and "annoying hooks" on some of the tracks. XXL's reviewer Mr. Blonde called it a "surprisingly fresh return", adding that MC Ren "has matured his rhyme style".

== Track listing ==
No.	Title	Writer(s)	Producer(s)	Length
1.	"Ruthless for Life"	Lorenzo Patterson; Lenton Terrell Hutton	L.T. Hutton	4:24
2.	"Who in the Fuck" (featuring 8Ball & MJG)	Patterson; Premro Smith; Marlon Goodwin; Triston Jones	T-Mix	4:04
3.	"Nigga Called Ren"	Patterson; Anthony Banks	Ant Banks	4:06
4.	"Comin' After You" (featuring Ice Cube)	Patterson; O'Shea Jackson; Bobby Ervin	DJ Bobcat	3:58
5.	"Voyage to Compton"	Patterson; Jones; Marvin Isley; O'Kelly Isley Jr.; Ronald Isley; Rudolph Isley; Ernie Isley; Chris Jasper	T-Mix	4:24
6.	"Must Be High"	Patterson; Jones	T-Mix	3:23
7.	"So Whatcha Want" (featuring Snoop Dogg and RBX)	Patterson; Calvin Broadus; Eric Collins; Hutton	L.T. Hutton	4:40
8.	"Shot Caller" (featuring Big Rocc and Tha Chill)	Patterson; Jerry Brown; Vernon Johnson; N. Steele	Tha Chill; DJ Raw Steel	4:22
9.	"All the Same"	Patterson; Banks	Ant Banks	3:29
10.	"Who Got That Street Shit"	Patterson; Tony Issac	Touchtone	4:47
11.	"Pimpin' Is Free" (featuring Peeps)	Patterson; Precious King; Larry Johnson; Alan Tatum	Larry Johnson; Alan "Byrd" Tatum	4:14
12.	"CPT All Day"	Patterson; Treyvon Green	Young Tre	4:19
Total length:				50:10

Sample credits

- Track 5 contains an interpolation of "Voyage to Atlantis" written by Marvin Isley, O'Kelly Isley Jr., Ronald Isley, Rudolph Isley, Ernie Isley and Chris Jasper.

== Personnel ==
- Lorenzo "MC Ren" Patterson – vocals, executive producer
- Premro "8Ball" Smith – vocals (track 2)
- Marlon "MJG" Goodwin – vocals (track 2)
- O'Shea "Ice Cube" Jackson – vocals (track 4)
- Calvin "Snoop Dogg" Broadus – vocals (track 7)
- Eric "RBX" Collins – vocals (track 7)
- Jerry "Big Rocc" Brown – vocals (track 8)
- Vernon "Tha Chill" Johnson – vocals & producer (track 8)
- Precious "Peeps" King – vocals (track 11)
- Leejon – background vocals (tracks: 3, 9)
- Anthony "Ant" Banks – keyboards, arranger, programming, producer, recording (tracks: 3, 9)
- James "Tre" Rabb – guitar (tracks: 3, 9)
- Lenton T. Hutton – programming, recording & mixing (track 1), drum programming (track 7), producer (tracks: 1, 7)
- Triston "T-Mix" Jones – producer & recording (tracks: 2, 5, 6)
- Bobby "DJ Bobcat" Ervin – producer (track 4)
- N. "DJ Raw Steel" Steele – producer (track 8)
- Tony "Touch Tone" Issacs – producer (track 10)
- Larry Johnson – producer (track 11)
- Alan "Byrd" Tatum – producer (track 11)
- Treyvon "Young Tre" Green – producer (track 12)
- Tim Nitz – recording (track 1), mixing (tracks: 1, 10)
- Jay Gonzalez – recording (track 4)
- Carlos Warlick – recording (track 7), mixing (tracks: 4, 7)
- Paul Andris – recording (tracks: 8, 10–12), mixing (tracks: 8, 11, 12)
- Simon "Crazy C." Cullins – mixing (tracks: 2, 5, 6)
- James Hoover – mixing (tracks: 2, 5, 6)
- Michael Denten – mixing (tracks: 3, 9)
- Tom Baker – mastering
- Tomica Wright – executive producer
- Giulio Costanzo – art direction
- Peter Dokus – cover photo
- Lucky Nantana – A&R
- Mark Spier – sample clearances
- Madeleine Smith – sample clearances

== Charts ==
Chart (1998)	Peak position
US Billboard 200	100
US Top R&B/Hip-Hop Albums (Billboard)	14
