= CPO (group) =

American hip-hop group

- Also known as: Capital Punishment Organization; C.P.O.
- Origin: Compton, California, U.S.
- Genres: West Coast hip hop; gangsta rap
- Years active: 1989–1991
- Labels: Capitol
- Past members: CPO Boss Hogg; Young D The Chip; DJ Train

CPO (an abbreviation of Capital Punishment Organization) was an American hip hop group from Compton, California, founded in 1989 by rapper Vince "Lil' Nation" Edwards and DJ Clarence "D.J. Train" Lars, and enlisted producer Daron "Young D" Sapp shortly thereafter. Fellow rapper Granville "The Chip" Moton was one-time member of the group.

They released a single album in 1990, To Hell and Black, which included production from MC Ren of N.W.A. and was distributed by Capitol Records. To Hell and Black peaked at No. 33 on the Top R&B/Hip-Hop Albums Billboard charts.

DJ Train, who had worked mostly with MC Ren and J. J. Fad, died of smoke inhalation in a house fire on July 26, 1994.

Lil' Nation later identified himself as (Tha) Boss Hogg, or "CPO" in the singular form. CPO Boss Hogg continued to make rap appearances, including the 1994 original soundtrack to Above the Rim, E-A-Ski on his 1998 album, and the 2000 self-titled album by Tha Eastsidaz. He died in 2022.

== Discography ==
Studio albums

- To Hell and Black (1990)

Singles

- "Ballad of a Menace" (1990)
- "This Beat Is Funky" (1990)

Soundtrack appearances

Title	Release	Soundtrack
"Somethin' Like This"	1990	The Return of Superfly

== Videography ==
Music videos

- "Ballad of a Menace" (1990)
- "This Beat Is Funky" (1990)
