= MC Ren =

American rapper (born 1969)

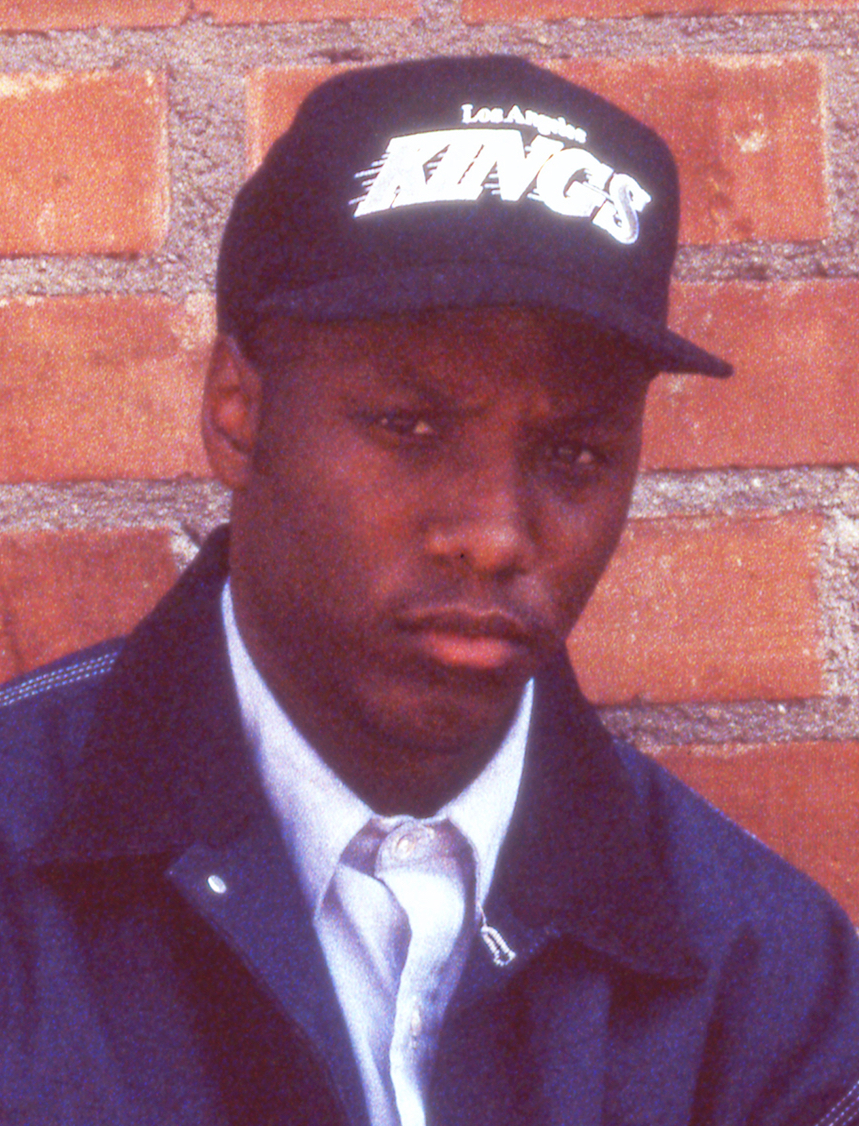
- MC Ren in 1990
- Born: Lorenzo Jerald Patterson; June 16, 1969 (age 57); Compton, California, U.S.
- Other names: Ren; Villain; Ruthless Villain; The Villain in Black; Rebel Villain; Nation Villain
- Occupations: Rapper; record producer; songwriter
- Years active: 1987–present
- Spouse: Yaasamen Alaa (m. 1993)
- Children: 5
- Musical career
- Genres: West Coast hip-hop; gangsta rap; political hip-hop
- Instrument: Vocals
- Labels: Ruthless; Priority; Relativity; Epic; Villain
- Formerly of: N.W.A

Lorenzo Jerald Patterson (born June 16, 1969), known professionally by his stage name MC Ren, is an American rapper, songwriter, and record producer from Compton, California. He is the founder and owner of the independent record label Villain Entertainment.

MC Ren began his career as a solo artist signed to Eazy-E's Ruthless Records in early 1987, while still attending high school. By mid-1988, after having written nearly half of Eazy-Duz-It, Ren had become a member of N.W.A, with whom he recorded two studio albums and one EP. After the group disbanded in 1991, Ren stayed with Ruthless, releasing three solo albums—including the controversial Shock of the Hour (1993)—before leaving the label in 1998.

In 2016, he was inducted into the Rock and Roll Hall of Fame as a member of N.W.A. In 2024, he received a Grammy Lifetime Achievement Award as a member of N.W.A. He showed up to the ceremony to accept the award along with Ice Cube, DJ Yella, The D.O.C., and Lil Eazy-E.

== Early life ==
Lorenzo Jerald Patterson was born in Compton, California, on June 16, 1969, and raised in Pannes Ave. around Kelly Park. He grew up with his parents, two brothers and a sister. His father used to work for "the government", until he later opened up his own barber shop. Patterson joined the Kelly Park Compton Crips (of which Eazy-E would also become a member) in attempt to make money, but soon departed and turned to drug dealing as he felt it was more lucrative. Following a raid on his childhood friend MC Chip's house, Patterson quit dealing and focused thereafter on making music.

Patterson attended Dominguez High School, where he met his future collaborator, DJ Train. At this time, he developed an interest in hip hop music, and began writing songs with MC Chip, with whom he formed the group Awesome Crew, and performed at parties and nightclubs. Patterson officially began his rap career upon joining forces with another childhood friend, Eric "Eazy-E" Wright, in 1985. Patterson graduated from high school in 1987 and he planned to join the United States Army after graduation, but changed his mind after watching the 1987 film Full Metal Jacket.

== Music career ==
=== Career beginnings: 1987–1991 ===
In 1987, Patterson was signed as a solo artist to Eazy-E's Ruthless Records, while still attending high school. However, when Ice Cube went to study for a year, Ren was asked to write songs for the in-progress Eazy-Duz-It. After writing as well as appearing on much of the album, MC Ren officially joined N.W.A by the summer of 1988, when the group started working on their debut album Straight Outta Compton. With a budget of US$8,000, the album was finished in four weeks and released in January 1989. Propelled by "Fuck tha Police", the album became a major success, despite an almost complete absence of radio airplay or major concert tours. The FBI sent Ruthless a warning letter in response to the song's content.

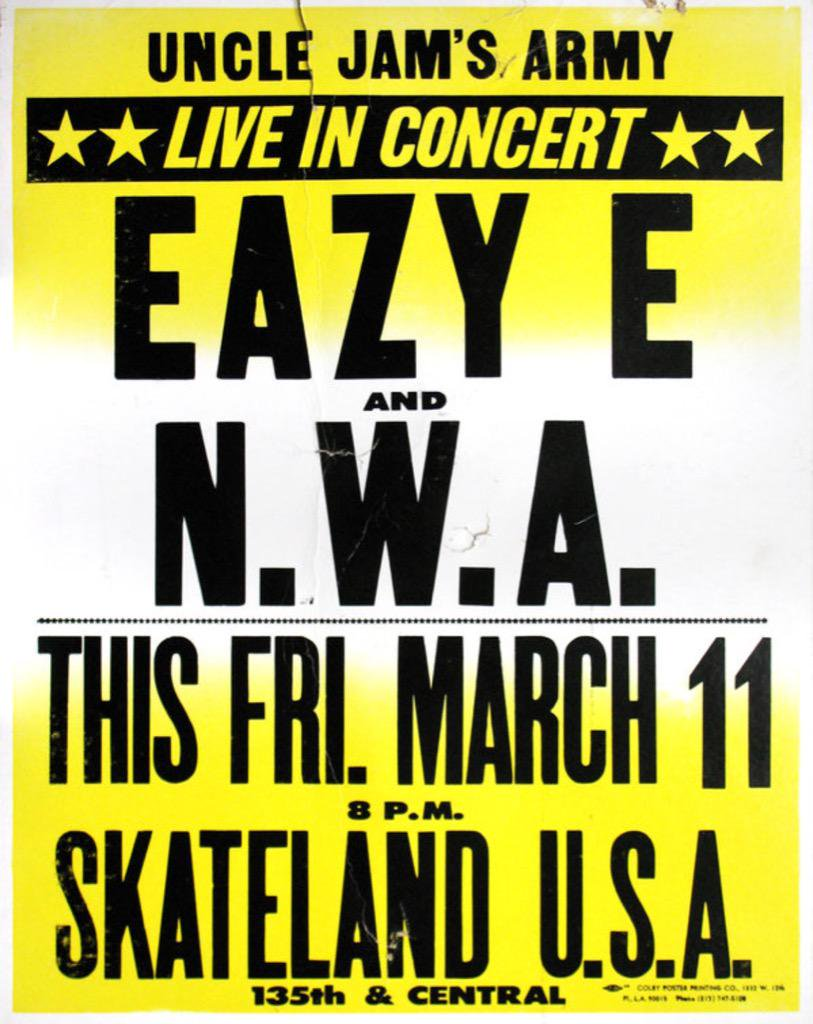
Poster for one of N.W.A's first concerts at a Compton skating rink, 1988

Two months before Straight Outta Compton, Eazy-Duz-It was released, with lyrics largely written by Patterson, with contributions from Ice Cube and The D.O.C.

Following Ice Cube's departure from the group in 1989, N.W.A quickly released the EP 100 Miles and Runnin' with lyrics written by Patterson, with contributions by The D.O.C. The group's second full-length studio album, Niggaz4Life, was released the next year. Selling 955,000 copies in the 1st week and was certified as Platinum, it became the first rap album to enter #1 on the Billboard charts. This album would become the group's final, as Dr. Dre left the group over financial disputes with Jerry Heller.

According to Patterson, it was common opinion that Heller was the one receiving their due:

We felt he didn't deserve what he was getting. We deserved that shit. We were the ones making the records, traveling in vans and driving all around the place. You do all those fucking shows trying to get known, and then you come home to a fucking apartment. Then you go to his house, and this motherfucker lives in a mansion. There's gold leaf trimmings all in the bathroom and all kinds of other shit. You're thinking, "Man, fuck that."

=== Solo career: 1992–present ===
As N.W.A disbanded, Patterson started recording his first solo release titled Kizz My Black Azz. The 6-track EP was entirely produced by DJ Bobcat, except for one song that Patterson produced himself. Released in summer 1992, the EP was a hit, commercially and critically. Without any radio play, the EP went Platinum within 2 months.

Patterson began recording for his debut album, at that time called Life Sentence, in late 1992. During the recording process, Patterson joined the Nation of Islam with guidance from DJ Train. This caused him to scrap Life Sentence, and Shock of the Hour was released in late 1993. The album debuted at #1 on the R&B charts, selling 321,000 copies in its first month. Shock of the Hour was regarded as being more focused, yet even more controversial, and critics accused him again of being anti-white, misogynist, and antisemitic. The album is thematically divided into two sides; the first half deals with social issues like ghetto life, drug addiction, racism and poverty. The second half shows Patterson's political side, as that half was recorded after he joined the Nation of Islam. The album features the hit singles "Same Ol' Shit" and "Mayday on the Frontline".

After 2 years of not talking to each other, Patterson reunited with Eazy-E in October 1994, to produce their duet song "Tha Muthpukkin' Real" produced by DJ Yella, with Patterson co-producing. Five months later; on March 26, 1995, Eazy-E would die from complications of AIDS. The song "Tha Muthpukkin' Real" was originally recorded for one of Patterson's projects, but after Eazy's death Patterson decided to allow DJ Yella to put the song on Eazy's posthumous album Str8 off tha Streetz of Muthaphukkin Compton. The song was released as a single in 1996 along with the rest of the album.

Patterson soon fell on hard times when both DJ Train and Eazy-E died before the release of The Villain in Black. The album, which was released in early 1996 and represented Patterson's first attempt at imitating the G-funk sound of Dr. Dre's The Chronic, was not well received by critics. It was also heavily criticized for what many saw as Patterson's pandering to gangsta rap at the cost of a reduction in the sociopolitical content found on his earlier releases. The album debuted at #31 on the pop-charts, with the first week's sales of 31,000 copies. By the second month it had sold 131,000 copies.

Before leaving Ruthless, Patterson released Ruthless for Life in 1998, which proved a small comeback, selling moderately well. The album features Ice Cube, Snoop Dogg, RBX and 8Ball & MJG, among others. This was the first time Patterson worked with new producers. By the end of 1998, Patterson had left Ruthless.

On October 31, 2009, Patterson released his fourth studio album entitled Renincarnated, which was released under his own record label Villain Entertainment. Renincarnated was only released in the US.

In 2015, Patterson stated that he had been working on his second EP, titled Rebel Music and released two singles: the title track, "Rebel Music", and "Burn Radio Burn". The official remix for "Rebel Music" was released in June 2014, and features Ice Cube. It was originally expected to be released by the end of 2015 but remained unreleased until 2022 when he canceled the project and followed it up with a new EP, Osiris via Twitter.

On May 22, 2022, he announced the track list of Osiris, and released the EP on June 3, 2022. The eight-track EP is entirely produced by Tha Chill and features guest appearances from Kurupt, Kokane, Cold 187um, Ras Kass and others.

=== Collaborations: 1987–present ===
Outside of N.W.A, Patterson contributed to several albums released on Ruthless Records. In 1988, he contributed to Eazy-Duz-It. Although officially released as a solo album by Eazy-E, numerous artists contributed. Patterson, the only guest rapper on the album, features raps of his own on almost half of the album. Eazy-Duz-It was produced by Dr. Dre and DJ Yella, while Patterson, Ice Cube and The D.O.C. wrote the lyrics. Patterson contributed vocals to albums by several artists on Ruthless during this period, including J. J. Fad's Supersonic (1988), The D.O.C.'s No One Can Do It Better (1989) and Above the Law's Livin' Like Hustlers (1990).

In 1990, Patterson produced the only album for his protege group CPO, titled To Hell and Black. The group consisted of CPO Boss Hogg, DJ Train, and Young D. After the release of their debut album, the group dissolved. CPO Boss Hogg went to have a solo career, featuring on high-profile albums of N.W.A, Dr. Dre and Tupac, while DJ Train stayed with Patterson.

In 1993, Patterson introduced a new group called The Whole Click. The group featured Patterson's longtime collaborator Bigg Rocc, Grinch, Bone and Patterson's brother, Juvenile. The group first appeared on Patterson's debut album Shock of the Hour. The collective later split up. Bigg Rocc continued to collaborate with Patterson, featuring him on all his solo albums.

In 2000, he appeared on the song "Hello", which featured Dr. Dre and Ice Cube on Ice Cube's War & Peace Vol. 2 (The Peace Disc) album. He joined the Up in Smoke Tour that same year to rap his verse on the track. He also appeared on the posse cut "Some L.A. Niggaz" from Dr. Dre's 2001 album.

Patterson's recent work has appeared on some more politically oriented projects with Public Enemy, specifically Paris's album Hard Truth Soldiers Vol. 1 as well as on Public Enemy's album Rebirth of a Nation. Paris stated in an interview with rapstation.com that: "MC Ren is retired and won't be doing a full-length album as far as I know. I get at him for verses, that's about it."

In April 2016, Patterson reunited with the former members of N.W.A at Coachella.

== Other ventures ==
=== Film career ===
In 1992, Patterson was offered the role for A-Wax in Menace II Society. Despite accepting the role, Patterson later changed his mind and the role was given to MC Eiht.

In 2004, Patterson released the straight-to-DVD film Lost in the Game. The movie was produced, written and directed by Patterson, with Playboy T assisting. It was an independent movie released by Patterson's company Villain.

Patterson was portrayed by Aldis Hodge in the 2015 N.W.A biopic Straight Outta Compton.

== Legal issues ==
In July 1989, at a post-concert party, MC Ren allegedly lured Sheila Davis to N.W.A.’s tour bus, raped and impregnated her. Davis was 16 at the time. In November 1990, she filed a lawsuit against MC Ren along with N.W.A. members DJ Yella, Dr. Dre, and Eazy-E. MC Ren denied having sex with Davis, and the band’s manager, Jerry Heller, alleged that Davis’ team never provided proof of paternity. Davis’s attorney said that a blood test showed a 99.8 percent probability that MC Ren was the child’s biological father.

In 1992, the rap group’s lawyers agreed to pay Davis $350,000; however, they refused to pay. In July 1993, a judge ordered the case to be retried. In December 1993, the case was settled out of court. Davis received $2 million.

== Personal life ==
In April 1993, Patterson began attending a mosque, and by July he was a fully registered member of the Nation of Islam, known as Lorenzo X. Two years later he left the organization and converted to Sunni Islam.

In June 1993, he married Yaasamen Alaa, with whom he has five children. His oldest son, Anthony, is an aspiring rapper under the name "Waxxie", and has collaborated with other sons of N.W.A members.

== Artistry ==
=== Influences ===
Patterson stated that KRS-One, Chuck D, Rakim, Big Daddy Kane, and Run-DMC are his biggest influences. MC Ren also stated Criminal Minded by Boogie Down Productions as his all-time favorite hip hop album.

=== Legacy ===
In 2024, MC Ren was awarded a Grammy Lifetime Achievement Award as a member of N.W.A.

== Discography ==
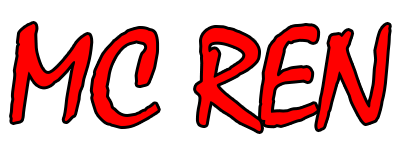
Logo used by MC Ren since 2009

Solo

- Kizz My Black Azz (1992) (Note: Released as a studio EP/mini-album.)
- Shock of the Hour (1993)
- The Villain in Black (1996)
- Ruthless for Life (1998)
- Lost in the Game (2009) (Note: Released as a soundtrack EP/mini-album.)
- Renincarnated (2009)
- Osiris (2022) (Note: Released as a studio EP/mini-album.)

Collaborative

- Straight Outta Compton (with N.W.A) (1989)
- 100 Miles and Runnin' (with N.W.A) (1990)
- Niggaz4Life (with N.W.A) (1991)

== Filmography ==
Films
Year	Title	Role	Notes
1993	Niggaz4Life: The Only Home Video	Himself	Documentary
2000	Up in Smoke Tour	Himself	Concert film
2005	Lost in the Game	The Vill	Main role
2017	The Defiant Ones	Himself	TV documentary
Biographical portrayals in film
Year	Title	Portrayed by	Notes
2015	Straight Outta Compton	Aldis Hodge	Biographical film about N.W.A
2016	Surviving Compton: Dre, Suge & Michel'le	Daniel DeBoe	Biographical film about Michel'le

== Awards and nominations ==
Grammy Awards

Year	Nominee / work	Award	Result
1990	"We're All in the Same Gang"	Best Rap Performance by a Duo or Group	Nominated
2024	Himself (as a member of N.W.A.)	Grammy Lifetime Achievement Award	Won

Rock and Roll Hall of Fame

Year	Nominee / work	Award	Result
2016	MC Ren	Performer (as a member of N.W.A.)	Won
