= 1996 in hip-hop =

This article summarizes the events, album releases, and album release dates in hip-hop for the year 1996.

== Released albums ==
Release Date	Artist	Album
January 9	Various Artists	Don't Be a Menace to South Central While Drinking Your Juice in the Hood (soundtrack)
January 9	Kid Rock	Early Mornin' Stoned Pimp
January 9	The Brotherhood	Elementalz
January 23	The D.O.C.	Helter Skelter
January 23	Speech	Speech
January 30	Eazy-E	Str8 off tha Streetz of Muthaphukkin Compton
January 30	Various Artists	A Thin Line Between Love and Hate (soundtrack)
February 13	2Pac	All Eyez on Me
February 13	Fugees	The Score
February 13	I.M.P.	Ill Mannered Playas
February 13	Mad Skillz	From Where???
February 20	Ganksta N-I-P	Psychotic Genius
February 20	Lord Finesse	Awakening
February 27	Dark Sun Riders	Seeds of Evolution
February 27	Suga-T	Paper Chasin'
March 5	The Conscious Daughters	Gamers
March 12	Plains of Fascination	Join the Ranks
March 12	Wise Intelligent	Killin' U... For Fun
March 19	Bahamadia	Kollage
March 19	Rappin' 4-Tay	Off Parole
March 19	Smoothe da Hustler	Once Upon a Time in America
March 19	Omniscence	The Raw Factor
March 26	Busta Rhymes	The Coming
March 26	Cella Dwellas	Realms 'n Reality
March 26	DJ Yella	One Mo Nigga ta Go
March 26	Ill Biskits	Chronicle of Two Losers: The First Edition
March 26	Nonchalant	Until the Day
April 2	Beastie Boys	The In Sound From Way Out!
April 2	Geto Boys	The Resurrection
April 9	MC Eiht	Death Threatz
April 9	MC Ren	The Villain in Black
April 9	Chino XL	Here to Save You All
April 9	Various Artists	The Substitute (soundtrack)
April 16	Master P	Ice Cream Man
April 16	Kwest Tha Madd Lad	This Is My First Album
April 19	Insane Clown Posse	Tunnel of Love
April 23	Various Artists	Sunset Park (soundtrack)
April 23	Mac Mall	Untouchable
April 23	Erick Sermon	Insomnia
April 23	DJ Kool	Let Me Clear My Throat
April 30	Celly Cel	Killa Kali
April 30	Various Artists	Original Gangstas (soundtrack)
April 30	Various Artists	The Great White Hype (soundtrack)
May 7	Esham	Dead Flowerz
May 7	Kool Keith	Dr. Octagonecologyst
May 7	Large Professor	The LP
May 14	Luke	Uncle Luke
May 14	MC Breed	To Da Beat Ch'all
May 14	Real Live	The Turnaround: A Long Awaited Drama
May 15	Messy Marv	Messy Situationz
May 21	Dr. Dre	First Round Knock Out
May 21	Lil' ½ Dead	Steel on a Mission
May 21	Various Artists	Eddie (soundtrack)
May 21	Too $hort	Gettin' It (Album Number Ten)
May 22	Various Artists	So So Def Bass All-Stars
May 28	Shyheim	The Lost Generation
May 28	Pete Miser	What It Be...
June 1	People Without Shoes	Thoughts of an Optimist
June 1	Hyenas In The Desert	Die Laughing
June 4	Delinquent Habits	Delinquent Habits
June 4	Digital Underground	Future Rhythm
June 4	Various Artists	The Nutty Professor (soundtrack)
June 4	Lost Boyz	Legal Drug Money
June 4	Ice-T	Ice-T VI: Return of the Real
June 4	Kool G Rap	Rated XXX
June 4	Young Lay	Black 'N Dangerous
June 11	Heather B	Takin' Mine
June 18	Heltah Skeltah	Nocturnal
June 18	Jewel-T	Gangsta Chronicles
June 19	Various Artists	Kazaam (soundtrack)
June 25	Jay-Z	Reasonable Doubt
June 25	Punk Barbarians	Sex, Props, Cream... And The Drama In Between
June 25	Quad City DJ's	Get On Up and Dance
June 25	Various Artists	America Is Dying Slowly
June 25	Prince Paul	Psychoanalysis: What Is It?
July 2	Crucial Conflict	The Final Tic
July 2	De La Soul	Stakes Is High
July 2	N.W.A	Greatest Hits
July 2	Nas	It Was Written
July 9	New Kingdom	Paradise Don't Come Cheap
July 15	Funk Mobb	It Ain't 4 Play
July 15	Al' Tariq	God Connections
July 15	Sadat X	Wild Cowboys
July 15	Various Artists	Fled (soundtrack)
July 16	Trinity Garden Cartel	Da Saga Continues
July 23	11/5	A-1 Yola
July 30	A Tribe Called Quest	Beats, Rhymes and Life
July 30	Mr. Mike	Wicked Wayz
July 30	UGK	Ridin' Dirty
July 30	Various	Phat Beach (soundtrack)
July 30	Various Artists	Supercop (soundtrack)
August 6	Marvaless	Wiccked
August 6	Nine	Cloud 9
August 6	San Quinn	The Hustle Continues
August 13	Akinyele	Put It In Your Mouth
August 13	Blahzay Blahzay	Blah Blah Blah
August 13	Cypress Hill	Unreleased and Revamped
August 13	Facemob	The Other Side of the Law
August 13	Tha Mexakinz	Tha Mexakinz
August 20	Various Artists	High School High (soundtrack)
August 20	Insane Poetry	Blacc Plague
August 20	Paperboy	City to City
August 20	Silkk	The Shocker
August 20	Various Artists	The Fan (soundtrack)
August 26	Various Artists	Rapmasters: From Tha Priority Vaults, Vol. 2
August 27	A+	Latch Key Child
August 27	Bloods & Crips	Bangin' on Wax: Greatest Hits
August 27	Passion	Baller's Lady
August 27	MC Lyte	Bad As I Wanna B
August 27	OutKast	ATLiens
August 27	Sir Mix-a-Lot	Return of the Bumpasaurus
September 3	Do or Die	Picture This
September 3	Dru Down	Can You Feel Me
September 3	Various Artists	Bulletproof (soundtrack)
September 10	Young Ed	Time To Stack
September 10	Foesum	Perfection
September 10	Various Artists	Relativity Urban Assault
September 16	DJ Shadow	Endtroducing.....
September 17	Mr. 3-2	The Wicked Buddah Baby
September 17	Whodini	Six
September 21	Juggaknots	Clear Blue Skies
September 24	Dr. Dre	Back 'n the Day
September 24	The Roots	Illadelph Halflife
September 24	Various Artists	Set It Off (soundtrack)
September 24	Raw Breed	Killa Instinct
October 1	The Dayton Family	F.B.I. (Fuck Being Indicted)
October 1	Ras Kass	Soul on Ice
October 1	Guce	Clear and Present Danger
October 8	Various Artists	Get on the Bus (soundtrack)
October 10	Ultra	Big Time
October 11	Grav	Down to Earth
October 15	Da Bush Babees	Gravity
October 15	Jeru the Damaja	Wrath of the Math
October 15	Poor Righteous Teachers	The New World Order
October 15	Xzibit	At the Speed of Life
October 22	Westside Connection	Bow Down
October 22	PMD	Business is Business
October 22	M.O.P.	Firing Squad
October 22	House of Pain	Truth Crushed to Earth Shall Rise Again
October 22	Chuck D	Autobiography of Mistachuck
October 22	Above the Law	Time Will Reveal
October 24	Various Artists	Rapmasters: From Tha Priority Vaults, Vol. 3
October 29	E-40	Tha Hall of Game
October 29	Black Moon	Diggin' In Dah Vaults
October 29	Da Brat	Anuthatantrum
October 29	Freak Nasty	Controversee...That's Life...And That's the Way It Is
October 29	II D Extreme	From I Extreme II Another
October 29	Ghostface Killah	Ironman
October 29	O.G.C.	Da Storm
October 29	Yo-Yo	Total Control
November 4	MC ADE	Ain't No Thang Like the Game
November 5	LL Cool J	All World: Greatest Hits
November 5	Makaveli (formerly 2Pac)	The Don Killuminati: The 7 Day Theory
November 5	Mo Thugs	Family Scriptures
November 5	Richie Rich	Seasoned Veteran
November 5	Sean T	Pimp Lyrics & Dollar Signs
November 5	Tela	Piece of Mind
November 12	Eminem	Infinite
November 12	Various Artists	Rapmasters: From Tha Priority Vaults, Vol. 4
November 12	Various Artists	Space Jam: Music from and Inspired by the Motion Picture
November 12	Lil' Kim	Hard Core
November 12	Snoop Doggy Dogg	Tha Doggfather
November 19	The Almighty RSO	Doomsday: Forever RSO
November 19	Flesh-N-Bone	T.H.U.G.S. (Trues Humbly United Gathering Souls)
November 19	Foxy Brown	Ill Na Na
November 19	Mobb Deep	Hell on Earth
November 19	Rap-A-Lot Records	10th Anniversary: Rap-a-Lot Records
November 19	Shaquille O'Neal	You Can't Stop the Reign
November 26	Keith Murray	Enigma
November 26	Aftermath Entertainment	Dr. Dre Presents the Aftermath
November 26	Death Row Records	Death Row Greatest Hits
November 26	Various Artists	NFL Jams
November 26	B-Legit	The Hemp Museum
November 26	B.G.	Chopper City
November 26	Various Artists	All That: The Album
December 3	Various Artists	Christmas on Death Row
December 3	Three 6 Mafia	Chapter 1: The End
December 10	Redman	Muddy Waters
December 10	Big Noyd	Episodes of a Hustla
Unknown	Deadringaz	New Ringa Order
Unknown	Ill Biskits	Chronicles of Two Losers: First Edition
Unknown	Siah and Yeshua DapoED	The Visuals EP
Unknown	One Guc Cide	Game of Life EP
Unknown	Various Artists	Rap Essentials: Volume One
Unknown	Mistik Journeymen	Children Ov Tha Night
Unknown	Mistik Journeymen	Pressed 4 Time

== Highest-charting singles ==
Hip hop singles from any year which charted in the 1996 Top 40 of the Billboard Hot 100
Song	Artist	Project	Peak position
"California Love"	2Pac featuring Dr. Dre & Roger Troutman	All Eyez On Me	1
"How Do U Want It"	2Pac featuring K-Ci & Jojo	All Eyez On Me	1
"Tha Crossroads"	Bone Thugs-N-Harmony	E. 1999 Eternal	1
"Loungin"	LL Cool J featuring Total	Mr. Smith	3
"1, 2, 3, 4 (Sumpin' New)"	Coolio	Gangsta's Paradise	5
"Woo Hah!! Got You All in Check	Busta Rhymes	The Coming	8
"Doin' It"	LL Cool J	Mr. Smith	9
"Elevators (Me & You)"	OutKast	ATLiens	12
"Tonite's Tha Night"	Kris Kross	Young, Rich & Dangerous	12
"Get Money"	Junior M.A.F.I.A. featuring The Notorious B.I.G.	Conspiracy	17
"Bow Down"	Westside Connection	Bow Down	21
"Po Pimp"	Do or Die featuring Twista	Picture This	22
"Too Hot"	Coolio	Gangsta's Paradise	24
"Fu-Gee-La"	Fugees	The Score	26
"It's All the Way Live (Now)"	Coolio	Eddie (soundtrack)	29
"My Boo"	Ghost Town DJ's	So So Def Bass All Stars	31
"What's Love Got to Do with It"	Warren G featuring Adina Howard	Supercop (soundtrack)	32

== Highest first-week sales ==
List of top ten albums with the highest first-week home market sales
Number	Album	Artist	1st-week sales	1st-week position	Genre
1	The Don Killuminati: The 7 Day Theory	2Pac	664,000	1	West Coast hip hop
2	All Eyez On Me	2Pac	566,500	1	West Coast hip hop
3	Tha Doggfather	Snoop Doggy Dogg	470,971	1	West Coast hip hop
4	It Was Written	Nas	268,000	1	East Coast hip hop
5	Family Scriptures	Mo Thugs	219,000	2	East Coast hip hop

== See also ==
- Last article: 1995 in hip hop music
- Next article: 1997 in hip hop music
