= Detroit (disambiguation) =

Detroit is a city in the U.S. state of Michigan.

Detroit may also refer to:

== Other places ==
- Detroit, Alabama, U.S.
- Detroit, Illinois, U.S.
- Detroit, Kansas, U.S.
- Detroit, Maine, U.S.
- Detroit Township, Becker County, Minnesota, U.S.
- Detroit, Oregon, U.S.
- Detroit, Texas, U.S.
- Detroit Beach, Michigan, U.S.
- Detroit Harbor, Wisconsin, U.S.
  - Detroit Harbor (bay)
- Detroit Island, Wisconsin, U.S.
- Detroit Lake, a reservoir in Oregon, U.S.
- Detroit Lakes, Minnesota, U.S.
- Detroit River, at the Canada-United States border
- Detroit Seamount, in the Pacific Ocean

== Arts and entertainment ==
=== Film, television and theatre ===
- Detroit (film), a 2017 American period crime drama film
- Detroit (play), by Lisa D'Amour, 2010
- Nathan Detroit, a fictional character in the musical Guys and Dolls

=== Gaming ===
- Detroit (video game), 1993
- Detroit: Become Human, a 2018 video game

=== Music ===
==== Groups ====
- Detroit (band), a rock group formed by Mitch Ryder
- Détroit, French musical duo of Bertrand Cantat and Pascal Humbert

==== Albums ====
- Detroit (mixtape), by Big Sean, 2012
- Detroit (Gerald Wilson album), 2009
- Yusef Lateef's Detroit, 1969

==== Songs ====
- "Detroit", from the 1967 Disney musical film The Happiest Millionaire
- "Detroit" (song), by Whiteout from the 1995 album Bite It by Whiteout
- "Detroit", by Everclear from the 1997 album White Trash Hell
- "Detroit", by Fireworks from the 2009 album All I Have to Offer Is My Own Confusion
- "Detroit", by Mondo Generator from the 2003 album A Drug Problem That Never Existed
- "Detroit '67", by Sam Roberts from the 2008 album Love at the End of the World
- "Detroit", by Rancid from the 1993 album Rancid
- "Detroit", by Gorillaz from the 2010 album The Fall

== Automotive industry ==
- Detroit (Wheeler Manufacturing), an automobile, 1904
- Detroit Assembly, a General Motors assembly plant making Cadillacs
- Detroit Automobile Company, in Detroit 1905–1906
- Detroit Auto Vehicle Company, an early automobile manufacturer
- Detroit Cyclecar, a cyclecar 1913–1914
- Detroit Diesel, a manufacturer of engines
- Detroit Electric, an early automobile manufacturer
- Detroit Steam Motors Corporation, an early steam car manufacturer
- Detroit-Dearborn, an early automobile manufacturer
- Detroit-Oxford, an automobile 1905–1906
- Downing-Detroit, a cyclecar 1913–1915
- Abbott-Detroit, an automobile 1909–1919

== Military ==
- HMS Detroit, the name of two British warships
- USS Detroit, the name of several US Navy ships
- Fort Detroit, on the north bank of the Detroit River 1701–1796
- Fort Shelby (Michigan), renamed Fort Detroit in 1805
- Mission Detroit, a part of the Normandy invasion in World War II

== People ==
- Marcella Detroit, singer, musician and songwriter
- Mehmed Ali Pasha (1827–1878), born Ludwig Karl Friedrich Detroit

== Sports ==
- Detroit Lions, National Football League
- Detroit Pistons, National Basketball Association
- Detroit Red Wings, National Hockey League
- Detroit Tigers, Major League Baseball
- Detroit Mercy Titans, the athletic program of the University of Detroit Mercy

== Other uses ==
- Detroit (horse) (1977–2001), a French racehorse
- Detroit: Race Riots, Racial Conflicts, and Efforts to Bridge the Racial Divide, a 2013 book

== See also ==
- Big Three (automobile manufacturers)#United States, all three based in Detroit
- Strait (the French loanword appears in various English toponyms)
- Detroiters, an American TV comedy series
