= 1997 in hip-hop =

This article summarizes the events, album releases, and album release dates in hip hop music for the year 1997.

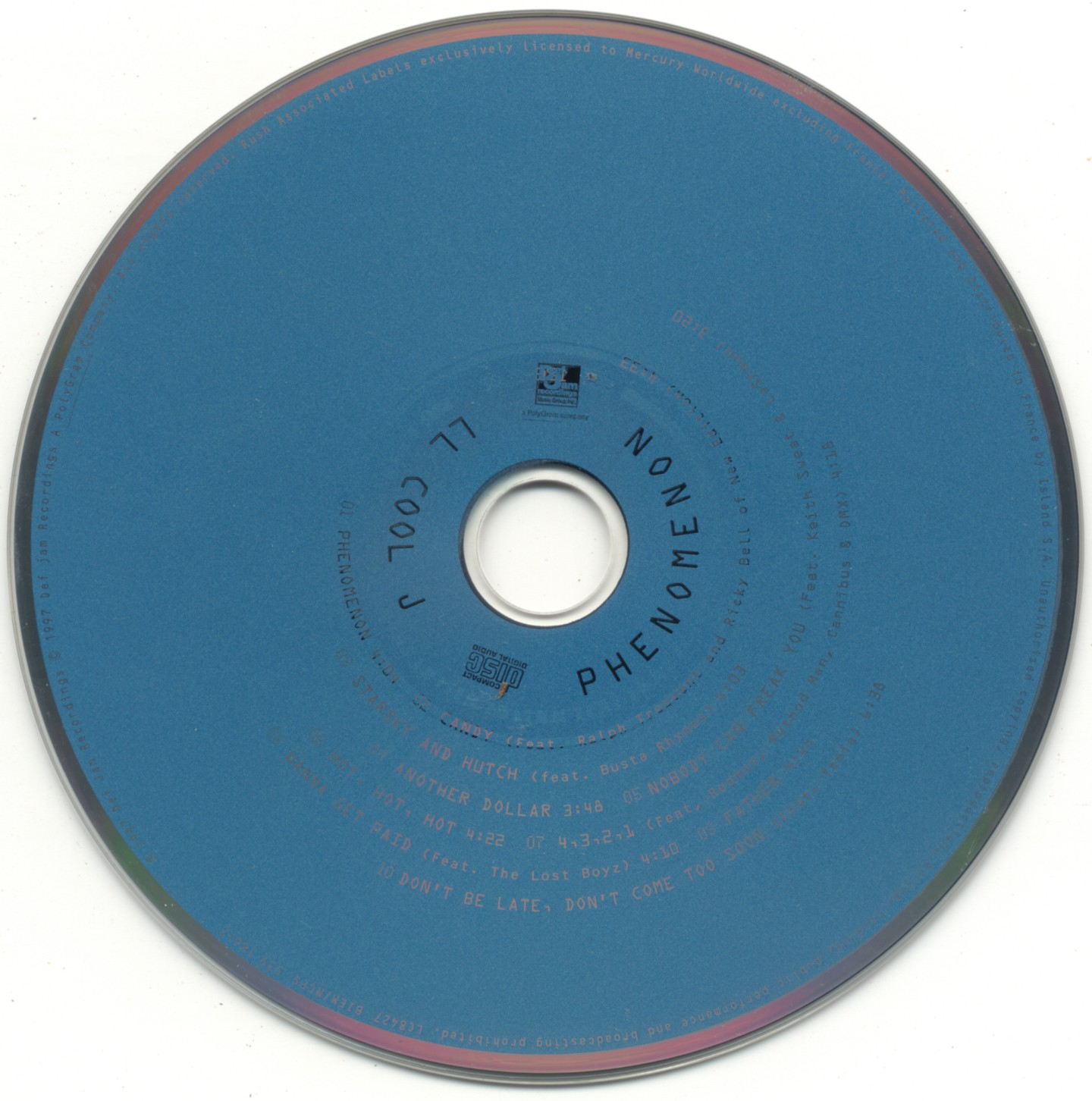
LL Cool J released Phenomenon , his seventh album in 1997, which earned an RIAA platinum certification.

== Released albums ==
Release Date	Artist	Album	Notes
January 14	Various Artists	Rhyme & Reason: Original Motion Picture Soundtrack	Debuted at No. 16 on the Billboard 200; Certified Gold
January 28	Camp Lo	Uptown Saturday Night	
January 28	Various Artists	Gridlock'd (soundtrack)	Debuted at No. 1 on the Billboard 200; Certified Gold
January 28	Various Artists	West Coast Bad Boyz II	Debuted at No. 16 on the Billboard 200; Certified Gold
February 4	Kool Keith	Sex Style	
February 4	C-Bo	One Life 2 Live	
February 4	Various Artists	The Sugar Hill Records Story	
February 11	Frankie Cutlass	Politics & Bullshit	
February 11	Funkmaster Flex	The Mix Tape, Vol. II	Debuted at No. 19 on the Billboard 200; Certified Gold
February 11	Various Artists	Dangerous Ground (soundtrack)	
February 18	Luniz	Bootlegs & B-Sides	
February 18	TRU	Tru 2 da Game	Debuted at No. 8 on the Billboard 200; Certified 2 x Platinum
February 25	Various Artists	Booty Call (soundtrack)	Debuted at No. 24 on the Billboard 200
March 4	Soul Assassins	The Soul Assassins, Chapter I	Debuted at No. 20 on the Billboard 200
March 11	Body Count	Violent Demise: The Last Days	
March 11	Ghetto Mafia	Straight from the Dec	
March 11	Scarface	The Untouchable	Debuted at No. 1 on the Billboard 200; Certified Platinum
March 18	The Fat Boys	All Meat No Filler!	
March 25	The Notorious B.I.G.	Life After Death	Debuted at No. 1 on the Billboard 200; Certified Diamond
March 25	Warren G	Take a Look Over Your Shoulder	Debuted at No. 11 on the Billboard 200; Certified Gold
March 25	Tracey Lee	Many Facez	
March 25	Various Artists	The 6th Man (soundtrack)	
April 7	Big Tymers	How You Luv That	
April 8	3X Crazy	Stackin' Chips	
April 8	Big Mike	Still Serious	
April 8	Crime Boss	Conflicts & Confusion	
April 8	Us3	Broadway & 52nd	
April 15	Artifacts	That's Them	Debuted at No. 134 on the Billboard 200
April 22	Ill Al Skratch	Keep It Movin'	
April 29	Various Artists	Sprung (soundtrack)	
May 6	Steady Mobb'n	Pre-Meditated Drama	
May 13	D12	The Underground E.P.	
May 13	Juvenile	Solja Rags	
May 20	Boot Camp Clik	For the People	
May 20	KRS-One	I Got Next	Debuted at No. 3 on the Billboard 200; Certified Gold
May 20	Various Artists	I'm Bout It (soundtrack)	Debuted at No. 4 on the Billboard 200
June	Esham	Bruce Wayne: Gothom City 1987	
June 1	Down Ta Erf	Down Ta Erf	
June 3	Wu-Tang Clan	Wu-Tang Forever	Debuted at No. 1 on the Billboard 200; Certified 4 x Platinum
June 3	Jungle Brothers	Raw Deluxe	
June 3	World-famous Beat Junkies	The World Famous Beat Junkies Volume 1	
June 3	Teflon	My Will	
June 10	Mike Ladd	Easy Listening 4 Armageddon	
June 10	Various Artists	So So Def Bass All-Stars Vol. II	
June 15	Cru	Da Dirty 30	
June 17	Capone-N-Noreaga	The War Report	Debuted at No. 21 on the Billboard 200
June 17	Lil' Keke	Don't Mess wit Texas	
June 17	The Lost Boyz	Love, Peace & Nappiness	
June 17	Boogiemonsters	God Sound	
June 24	The Beatnuts	Stone Crazy	
June 24	Craig Mack	Operation: Get Down	
June 24	Insane Clown Posse	The Great Milenko	
June 24	Twista	Adrenaline Rush	Debuted at No. 77 on the Billboard 200; Certified Gold
June 24	Mia X	Unlady Like	
June 24	The Lady of Rage	Necessary Roughness	
June 24	Wyclef Jean	Wyclef Jean Presents The Carnival	Debuted at No. 16 on the Billboard 200; Certified 2 x Platinum
June 29	Various Artists	The Album of the Year	
July 1	B.G.	It's All on U, Vol. 1	
July 1	Ghetto Twiinz	In That Water	
July 1	Various Artists	Nothing to Lose (soundtrack)	
July 11	Slum Village	Fan-Tas-Tic (Vol. 1)	
July 13	Chubb Rock	The Mind	
July 15	DJ Pooh	Bad Newz Travels Fast	
July 15	Missy "Misdemeanor" Elliott	Supa Dupa Fly	Debuted at No. 3 on the Billboard 200; Certified Platinum
July 15	Various Artists	Good Burger (soundtrack)	
July 22	Company Flow	Funcrusher Plus	
July 22	Puff Daddy & the Family	No Way Out	Debuted at No. 1 on the Billboard 200; Certified 7 x Platinum
July 29	Bone Thugs-n-Harmony	The Art of War	Debuted at No. 1 on the Billboard 200; Certified 4 x Platinum
July 29	D-Shot	Six Figures	
July 29	Kilo Ali	Organized Bass	Debuted at No. 173 on the Billboard 200
July 29	Rampage	Scout's Honor... By Way of Blood	
July 29	E-40 & B-Legit	Southwest Riders	
July 29	Trick Daddy	Based On A True Story	
July 29	Various Artists	Soul in the Hole (soundtrack)	
July 29	Various Artists	Steel (soundtrack)	
August 5	Atmosphere	Overcast!	
August 5	Killarmy	Silent Weapons for Quiet Wars	
August 5	Mr. Serv-On	Life Insurance	
August 5	Various Artists	How to Be a Player	
August 5	Various Artists	Rapmasters: From Tha Priority Vaults, Vol. 5	
August 5	Various Artists	Rapmasters: From Tha Priority Vaults, Vol. 6	
August 5	Various Artists	Rapmasters: From Tha Priority Vaults, Vol. 7	
August 5	Various Artists	Rapmasters: From Tha Priority Vaults, Vol. 8	
August 12	Hed PE	Hed PE	
August 12	Various Artists	Hoodlum (soundtrack)	
August 12	Various Artists	Money Talks (soundtrack)	
August 19	Kurtis Blow	Kurtis Blow Presents the History of Rap, Vol. 1	
August 19	Kurtis Blow	Kurtis Blow Presents the History of Rap, Vol. 2	
August 19	Kurtis Blow	Kurtis Blow Presents the History of Rap, Vol. 3	
August 19	O.C.	Jewelz	
August 19	Royal Flush	Ghetto Millionaire	
August 26	Coolio	My Soul	Debuted at No. 39 on the Billboard 200; Certified Platinum
August 26	Diamond D	Hatred, Passions and Infidelity	
August 26	Latryx	The Album	
August 26	The Mossie	Have Heart Have Money	
August 26	Tha Alkaholiks	Likwidation	
August 29	Various Artists	The Lawhouse Experience, Volume One	
September 2	Master P	Ghetto D	Debuted at No. 1 on the Billboard 200; Certified 3 x Platinum
September 16	Gravediggaz	The Pick, the Sickle and the Shovel	Debuted at No. 7 on the Billboard 200; Certified Platinum
September 16	Mack 10	Based on a True Story	Debuted at No. 14 on the Billboard 200; Certified Gold
September 16	Busta Rhymes	When Disaster Strikes...	Debuted at No. 3 on the Billboard 200; Certified Platinum
September 16	Various Artists	Soul Food (soundtrack)	
September 23	EPMD	Back in Business	Debuted at No. 16 on the Billboard 200; Certified Gold
September 23	MC Breed	Flatline	
September 23	Mood	Doom	
September 23	Organized Konfusion	The Equinox	
September 23	The X-Ecutioners	X-Pressions	
September 23	No I.D.	Accept Your Own and Be Yourself (The Black Album)	
September 30	Common	One Day It'll All Make Sense	Debuted at No. 61 on the Billboard 200
September 30	RBL Posse	An Eye for an Eye	Debuted at No. 70 at the Billboard 200
October 7	Various Artists	Gang Related - The Soundtrack	Debuted at No. 2 on. The Billboard 200; Certified 2 x Platinum
October 14	Kinfusion	Da Unhatched Breed	
October 14	Jurassic 5	Jurassic 5	
October 14	LL Cool J	Phenomenon	Debuted at No. 7 on the Billboard 200; Certified Platinum
October 14	Rawkus Records	Soundbombing	
October 21	The Firm	The Album	
October 21	Lil Jon & the East Side Boyz	Get Crunk, Who U Wit: Da Album	
October 21	Salt-n-Pepa	Brand New	
October 28	Hot Boys	Get It How U Live!	
October 28	Mase	Harlem World	
October 28	Natas	Multikillionaire: The Devil's Contract	
October 28	Psycho Realm	The Psycho Realm	
October 28	Spice 1	The Black Bossalini	
November 4	Jay-Z	In My Lifetime, Vol. 1	Debuted at No. 3 on the Billboard 200; Certified Platinum
November 4	Jedi Mind Tricks	The Psycho-Social, Chemical, Biological & Electro-Magnetic Manipulation of Human Consciousness	
November 4	Mic Geronimo	Vendetta	
November 4	Rakim	The 18th Letter	Certified Gold
November 4	Three 6 Mafia	Chapter 2: World Domination	
November 10	MC Lyte	Badder Than B-Fore	
November 11	B.G.	It's All on U, Vol. 2	Debuted at No. 184 on the Billboard 200
November 11	Luniz	Lunitik Muzik''	Certified Gold
November 11	Luke	Changin' the Game	
November 11	MC Eiht	Last Man Standing	
November 11	Mystikal	Unpredictable	Debuted at No. 3 on the Billboard 200; Certified Platinum
November 11	Timbaland & Magoo	Welcome to Our World	
November 18	5th Ward Boyz	Usual Suspects	
November 18	Del the Funky Homosapien	Future Development	
November 18	MJG	No More Glory	
November 25	DFC	The Whole World's Rotten	
November 25	Priority Records	In tha Beginning...There Was Rap	
November 25	Will Smith	Big Willie Style	
November 25	2Pac	R U Still Down? (Remember Me)	Debuted at No. 2 on the Billboard 200; Certified 4 x Platinum
December 10	Eminem	Slim Shady EP	
December 16	Ice Cube	Featuring...Ice Cube	
December 16	Queen Pen	My Melody	Debuted at No. 78 on the Billboard 200
December 16	Various Artists	The Source Presents: Hip Hop Hits	
December 23	Eightball & MJG	Lyrics of a Pimp	

== Highest-charting singles ==
Hip hop singles which charted in the Top 40 of the Billboard Hot 100
Title	Artist	Peak position
"Can't Nobody Hold Me Down"	Puff Daddy featuring Mase	1
"I'll Be Missing You"	Puff Daddy featuring Faith Evans & 112	1
"Hypnotize"	The Notorious B.I.G.	1
"Mo Money Mo Problems"	The Notorious B.I.G. featuring Puff Daddy & Mase	1
"It's All About the Benjamins"	Puff Daddy featuring Lil' Kim, The Lox & The Notorious B.I.G.	2
"Look into My Eyes"	Bone Thugs-n-Harmony	4
"Feel So Good"	Mase featuring Kelly Price	5
"Dangerous"	Busta Rhymes	9
"C U When U Get There"	Coolio featuring 40 Thevz	12
"Smile"	Scarface featuring 2Pac & Johnny P.	12
"Ghetto Love"	Da Brat featuring T-Boz	12
"Up Jumps da Boogie"	Timbaland & Magoo featuring Aaliyah & Missy "Misdemeanor" Elliott	12
"I Shot The Sheriff"	Warren G	20
"Street Dreams"	Nas	22
"I Miss My Homies"	Master P featuring Silkk the Shocker, Pimp C & Sons of Funk	25
"Put Your Hands Where My Eyes Could See"	Busta Rhymes	27
"If I Could Teach the World"	Bone Thugs-n-Harmony	27
"What They Do"	The Roots featuring Raphael Saadiq	34
"Smokin' Me Out"	Warren G featuring Ronald Isley	35
"ATLiens"	OutKast	35
"Backyard Boogie"	Mack 10	38
"Gangstas Make the World Go Round"	Westside Connection	40

== Highest first-week sales ==
List of top ten albums with the highest first-week home market sales
Number	Album	Artist	1st-week sales	1st-week position	Genre
1	Life After Death	The Notorious B.I.G.	690,000	1	East Coast Hip Hop
2	Wu-Tang Forever	Wu-Tang Clan	612,000	1	East Coast Hip Hop
3	No Way Out	Puff Daddy & the Bad Boy Family	561,000	1	East Coast Hip Hop
4	R U Still Down? (Remember Me)	2Pac	549,000	2	West Coast Hip Hop
5	The Art Of War	Bone Thugs-n-Harmony	394,000	1	Midwest Hip Hop
6	Harlem World	Mase	273,000	1	East Coast Hip Hop
7	Ghetto D	Master P	260,000	1	Southern Hip Hop
8	Tru 2 da Game	TRU	200,000	8	Southern hip hop
9	The Untouchable	Scarface	169,000	1	Southern hip hop
10	When Disaster Strikes...	Busta Rhymes	165,000	3	East Coast Hip Hop

== See also ==
- Last article: 1996 in hip hop music
- Next article: 1998 in hip hop music
