= One Shot (The Brotherhood song) =

Single by The Brotherhood

from the album Elementalz
- Released: 1996
- Recorded: 1996
- Genre: Hip hop, gangsta rap
- Label: Bite It, Virgin
- Songwriter(s): My. Shylok, Mr. Spyce
- Producer(s): The Underdog

The Brotherhood singles chronology
"Alphabetical Response" (1996)	"One Shot" (1996)	"Punk Funk" (1996)

"One Shot" is the second and final single released from The Brotherhood debut album, Elementalz It was released in 1996 through Bite It, Virgin and was produced by The Underdog. The song peaked at #35 on the Hot Rap Singles and #28 on the Hot Dance Music/Maxi-Singles Sales.

== Single track listing ==
1. "One Shot"- 4:14 (LP Version)
2. "Nothing in Particular"- 5:11 (Instrumental)
3. "One Shot"- 4:21 (96 Remix)
4. "Nothing in Particular"- 4:12 (Subjectual Remix)
