= No Time =

No Time may refer to:

- No Time (EP), by Defiance, or the title song, 1997
- "No Time" (Frente! song), 1993
- "No Time" (The Guess Who song), 1969
- "No Time" (Just Jack song), 2007
- "No Time" (KSI song), 2021
- "No Time" (Lil' Kim song), 1996
- "No Time" (Mondo Rock song), 1982
- "No Time" (Serebro song), 2010
- "No Time" (Whiteout song), 1994
- "No Time", a song by Fiction Factory from Another Story, 1985
- "No Time", a song by the Hootenanny Singers, 1966
- "No Time", a song by Late of the Pier from Fantasy Black Channel, 2008
- "No Time", a song by Mark Stoermer from Another Life, 2011
- "No Time", a song by the Monkees from Headquarters, 1967
- "No Time", a song by the Move from Message from the Country, 1971
- "No Time", a song by Nav from Brown Boy 2, 2020
