= Faith in Chaos (Book of Revelations) =

Studio album by Insane Poetry
- Released: March 3, 2003
- Genre: Hardcore hip hop, horrorcore
- Label: Grim Reality Entertainment
- Producer: Jason "JP" Pearl; DJ Streek; Cyco; M-Boogie

Insane Poetry chronology
Blacc Plague (1996)	Faith in Chaos (Book of Revelations) (2003)	Fallen from Grace (2007)

Professional ratings
Review scores
Source	Rating
RapReviews	6.5/10 stars

Faith in Chaos (Book of Revelations) is the third album by American hip hop group Insane Poetry.

== Track listing ==
#	Title	Producer(s)	Performer(s)	Length
1	"Intro"	Jason "JP" Pearl	*Interlude*	1:14
2	"Faith in Chaos"	DJ Streek	Cyco	3:22
3	"OKS"	DJ Streek	Cyco	3:28
4	"Journey Inside My Mind"	Jason "JP" Pearl	Cyco	3:45
5	"Footsteps of Danger"	Jason "JP" Pearl	Cyco	3:37
6	"Voices in My Head"	Jason "JP" Pearl	Cyco	3:24
7	"Puffin' on Angeldust"	DJ Streek	Cyco	4:06
8	"Diary of a Killa"	Jason "JP" Pearl	Cyco	4:26
9	"Radio Kill 66.6"	DJ Streek	Cyco	0:38
10	"Cyco's Sermon"	Cyco	*Interlude*	3:36
11	"Fall of Babylon"	DJ Streek (Producer); Jason "JP" Pearl (co-producer)	Cyco	3:03
12	"Delilah"	Jason "JP" Pearl	Cyco	3:48
13	"Who Am I"	Jason "JP" Pearl	Cyco	3:58
14	"Interview"	Jason "JP" Pearl, Cyco	*Interlude*	5:21
15	"Life's a Gamble"	Jason "JP" Pearl	Cyco	5:02
16	"Trackin' a Killa"	Cyco	Cyco	2:54
17	"Any Given Monday (Intro)"	Cyco	*Interlude*	0:44
18	"Any Given Monday"	DJ Streek	Cyco	3:32
19	"Footsteps of Danger (Remix)"	Jason "JP" Pearl	Cyco	3:52
20	"Shout-Outs"	M-Boogie	Cyco	5:37
