= Jackie's Racing =

Single by Whiteout

from the album Bite It
- B-side: "Cousin Jane"; "So Confused"
- Released: 1995
- Recorded: 1994–1995 at Park Lane Studio (Glasgow), Battery Studios (London) and Bark Studio (London)
- Genre: Folk rock; Britpop
- Length: 12:27
- Label: Silvertone
- Songwriter(s): Carroll/Lindsay/Smith/Jones
- Producer(s): Oronsay Avenue; Kenny Paterson; Sarah Bedingham; Brian O'Shaughnessy

Whiteout singles chronology
"Detroit" (1994)	"Jackie's Racing" (1995)	"Kickout" (1997)

"Jackie's Racing" is a song by Scottish rock band Whiteout, released in 1995 (see 1995 in music). It was the band's fourth single, released shortly before their first album, Bite It, on which the song is featured also. The B-sides "Cousin Jane" and "So Confused" reappeared on the Japanese EP Young Tribe Rule later the same year. Music journalist M.C. Strong writes that "Jackie's Racing" was the band's "... most successful release, displaying a healthy affection for 60's West Coast pop a la Lovin' Spoonful and The Mamas & the Papas." Strong also mentions that the B-Side "So Confused" "... [brings] to mind the harmonies of American Beauty-era Grateful Dead."

== Track listing ==
CD and 12" vinyl:

1. "Jackie's Racing" – 3:21
2. "Cousin Jane" – 4:08
3. "So Confused" – 4:58

7" vinyl and cassette:

1. "Jackie's Racing" – 3:21
2. "Cousin Jane" – 4:08

All songs written by Carroll/Lindsay/Smith/Jones

== Personnel ==
- Andrew Caldwell – vocals
- Eric Lindsay – guitar, backing vocals
- Paul Carroll – bass, backing vocals
- Stuart Smith – drums

Additional personnel

- Phil Kane – Hammond organ, piano

== Production ==
- Production: Oransay Avenue and Kenny Paterson (track 1)
- Production: Oransay Avenue and Sarah Bedingham (track 2)
- Production: Oransay Avenue and Brian O'Shaughnessy (track 3)
- Mix: Brian O'Shaughnessy
- Assistant engineer: Alex Jones
- Cover design: George Miller
- Photography: Elaine Constantine

== Chart positions ==
Chart	Date of entry	Peak position
UK Singles Chart	1995-02-18	72
