= Fallen from Grace =

Studio album by Insane Poetry
- Released: October 16, 2007
- Genre: Hardcore hip hop, underground hip hop, horrorcore
- Label: Long Range/Koch
- Producer: Jason "JP" Pearl, DJ Roc, Big Tango Slimm, M-Boogie

Insane Poetry chronology
Faith in Chaos (Book of Revelations) (2003)	Fallen from Grace (2007)	Sutter Kain Presents Cyco the Snuff Reels (2008)

Professional ratings
Review scores
Source	Rating
RapReviews	8/10 stars

Fallen from Grace is the fourth album by American hip hop group Insane Poetry.

== Track listing ==
No.	Title	Producer(s)	Length
1.	"FFG Intro"	Jason "JP" Pearl	3:56
2.	"Kill You"	Jason "JP" Pearl	3:02
3.	"Boyz in a Box"	Jason "JP" Pearl	3:05
4.	"Next Dimension"	Jason "JP" Pearl	2:16
5.	"Heartless"	Jason "JP" Pearl	3:12
6.	"Suspect Zero"	Jason "JP" Pearl	2:24
7.	"Revenge" (featuring Lowdown)	DJ Roc	2:08
8.	"Peekin' thru Ya Back" (featuring Tre Dizzle)	Jason "JP" Pearl	4:47
9.	"Murderland"	Big Tango Slimm "JP" Pearl	4:32
10.	"Fallen from Grace"	DJ Roc	3:24
11.	"Jot My Life" (featuring Menacide)	Jason "JP" Pearl	4:19
12.	"Let's Ride" (featuring Freaks, JP tha Hustler, Lowdown, & Spark)	Jason "JP" Pearl	3:27
13.	"Heat"	Big Tango Slimm and Jason "JP" Pearl	3:16
14.	"Black Widow"	Jason "JP" Pearl	3:38
15.	"Game of Life"	Jason "JP" Pearl	4:12
16.	"Can You Feel My Pain"	Jason "JP" Pearl	3:44
17.	"Is It Good" (featuring Lowdown)	DJ Roc	4:25
18.	"FFG Outro"	Jason "JP" Pearl	7:58
19.	"Commercial"		0:35
