= Rapmasters: From Tha Priority Vaults, Vol. 5 =

Compilation album by Various Artists
- Released: August 5, 1997
- Recorded: 1987–1995
- Genre: West Coast hip hop, Southern hip hop, gangsta rap
- Length: 37:48
- Label: Priority Records
- Producer: Larry D, Erick Sermon, Bobby Bobcat Ervin, Battlecat, Ice Cube, Paris, Courtney Branch, Tracy Kendrick, KLC

Various Artists chronology
Rapmasters: From Tha Priority Vaults, Vol. 4 (1996)	Rapmasters: From Tha Priority Vaults, Vol. 5 (1997)	Rapmasters: From Tha Priority Vaults, Vol. 6 (1997)

Professional ratings
Review scores
Source	Rating
AllMusic	3/5 stars

Rapmasters: From Tha Priority Vaults, Vol. 5 is the fifth volume of an eight volume budget compilation series released by Priority Records throughout 1996 and 1997. Unlike the previous two volumes, there is no fully uncut explicit version available and this and the remaining three volumes [as well as the first two volumes] are only available in mostly censored edited versions. The version of Brotha Lynch Hung's R.I.P. (Also known as Rest In Piss) that appears here is not the same version that is found on Season of da Siccness but is rather the clean remixed and re-recorded version that would also appear on a couple of Brotha Lynch's best of collections and on The Best Of Black Market Records. Also, This volume is the only volume that doesn't feature Ice Cube (Whether as a solo artist or as an N.W.A member).

== Track listing ==
1. 99 Ways To Die (Master P)
2. You Gots To Chill (EPMD)
3. Final Frontier (MC Ren)
4. Marinatin' (Ras Kass)
5. R.I.P. (Brotha Lynch Hung)
6. Take a Hit (Mack 10)
7. Whatcha See? (Paris)
8. Had To Be a Hustler (Lil 1/2 Dead)
9. Payback II (Mia X)
