= Grim Reality (album) =

Studio album by Insane Poetry
- Released: August 18, 1992
- Genre: Hardcore hip hop Horrorcore; G-funk
- Length: 55:38
- Label: Nastymix/Ichiban Records; NMR 7108
- Producer: Insane Poetry; Joe Cooley

Insane Poetry chronology
Grim Reality (1992)	Blacc Plague (1996)

Professional ratings
Review scores
Source	Rating
Allmusic	4/5 stars
RapReviews.com	(8/10)
The Source	2.5/5 stars

Grim Reality is the debut album of American hip hop group Insane Poetry. Released on August 18, 1992, the album peaked at #98 on the Billboard Top R&B/Hip-Hop Albums chart and managed to sell 35,000 copies without any support or promotion. Allmusic reviewer Alex Henderson wrote, "Sounding like a cross between a horror movie and an audio documentary on societal breakdown...a CD this graphic isn't for everyone, but those who aren't turned off by all of the violent, shocking imagery will find Grim Reality to be compelling."

== Track listing ==
#	Title	Producer(s)	Performer(s)	Time	Samples
1	"Welcome to the Grim Side"	Insane Poetry	*Interlude*	1:13	
2	"Angel of Death"	Insane Poetry	Cyco	2:47	"Hot Pants" by James Brown; "Person to Person" by Average White Band; "The Big Beat" by Billy Squier
3	"How Ya Gonna Reason with a Psycho"	Insane Poetry	Cyco	4:30	"Sing a Simple Song" by Sly & the Family Stone; "Breakthrough" by Isaac Hayes; "More Bounce to the Ounce" by Zapp; "Atomic Dog" by George Clinton; “The Murder” by Bernard Herrmann (interpolation)
4	"The House that Dripped Blood"	Insane Poetry	Cyco	4:01	"Givin' Up Food for Funk" by The J.B.'s; "Apache" by Incredible Bongo Band
5	"Choppin' up a Body"	Insane Poetry	Cyco	1:18	
6	"If Rhymes Could Kill"	Joe Cooley	Cyco, Em Dee	2:50	
7	"Bring Ya Daughter to the Slaughter"	Insane Poetry	Cyco	5:12	
8	"Stalkin' with the Nitebreed"	Insane Poetry	Cyco; Death BLO; Joe Cooley; Kaotic Minds Corruptin'; Shakespeare the One-Man Riot	6:13	"Strictly Business" by EPMD; ”The Bridge” by M.C. Shan
9	"The Horror Facts"	Insane Poetry	*Interlude*	0:38	
10	"Grim Reality"	Insane Poetry	Cyco	2:33	"Hook and Sling Part - I" by Eddie Bo
11	"Six in the Chamber"	Insane Poetry	Cyco	3:43	"Sing a Simple Song" by Sly & the Family Stone; "More Bounce to the Ounce" by Zapp
12	"Till Death Do Us Part"	Insane Poetry	Cyco	3:55	I’m Goin’ Down” by Rose Royce
13	"One Careless Moment"	Insane Poetry	Cyco	1:44	
14	"Raise the Devil"	Insane Poetry	Cyco	3:55	"Long Red" by Mountain
15	"Manic Depressive"	Joe Cooley	Cyco	5:40	"You and Your Folks, Me and My Folks" by Funkadelic
16	"Exit Reality Side"	Insane Poetry	*Interlude*	0:55	
17	"How Ya Gonna Reason With a Psycho? (Psycho Mix)"	Insane Poetry	Cyco	4:38	

== Singles ==
Single information
"How Ya Gonna Reason with a Psycho?"
- Released: 1992
- B-Side: "If Rhymes Could Kill"

== Charts ==
Chart (1992)	Peak position
Top R&B Albums	98
