= Whiteout (band) =

British rock band

- Whiteout in 1994 (from left to right): Paul Carroll, Eric Lindsay, Andrew Caldwell, Stuart Smith

Background information
- Origin: Greenock, Scotland, UK
- Genres: Indie rock, Britpop, folk rock
- Years active: 1991–1999
- Labels: Angel Town, Silvertone, Yoyo
- Past members: Paul Carroll; Eric Lindsay; Mark Fairhurst; Andrew Caldwell; Stuart Smith; Eric Russell; Jim McDermott; Warren McIntyre; Sandy Manson

Whiteout were a British rock group from Greenock in Scotland, who were most famous for their hit "Jackie's Racing". Although they had existed in a different incarnation since the very early 1990s, the band's classic line-up consisted of Andrew Caldwell (vocals), Paul Carroll (bass), Eric Lindsay (guitar) and Stuart Smith (drums). The name came from a slang term for the disorientating effects of alcohol.

== History ==
=== Recording ===
Whiteout were the first guitar band to sign to the Silvertone label after their enormous success with the Stone Roses. Whiteout's principal recordings were the albums Bite It (1995) and Big Wow (1998). Their music was influenced by the country rock and glam rock of the early 1970s, as well as the aforementioned Stone Roses.

Whiteout achieved minor success during the Britpop era in the UK, co-headlining a tour with Oasis and supported The Charlatans and Pulp. They opened both the Glasgow Sound City event and the Phoenix festival in 1994 before releasing their second single, "Starrclub" (which included the line, "Look at me, i'm on TV"). The singles "Detroit" and "Jackie's Racing" followed and the group began to achieve a growing reputation in Japan.

On 11 October 1994 Whiteout performed at BBC Radio 1's Peel Sessions. They played four songs: "Everyday", "Time and Again", "Get Me Through", and "Higher".

=== Disbandment ===
Andrew Caldwell left the group in 1996, after Bite It (replaced briefly by Warren McIntyre) and by the time the (now three piece of Carroll, Lindsay & McDermott) band reemerged with their second album Big Wow in 1998 (The last track of which included the refrain "We'll all go down in history") it was to a largely dismissive reception from the music media. Original drummer Mark Fairhurst ('Fudge') had replaced McDermott on drums in 1997, appearing on two of Big Wow's tracks, but Whiteout split soon after, around 1999, shortly after becoming a four-piece again with Eric Russell on keys.

=== Post-split ===
The only recorded material since has come from Eric Lindsay's outfit 'Eli', and the album Dreams Are The Foundations of Reality (2009), though there have been brief outings by combinations of Lindsay, Carroll and Russell since the split in various acoustic and electric incarnations. Lindsay can currently be found playing guitar with ex-Superstar frontman Joe McAlinden's band, Linden.

== Discography ==
=== Studio albums ===
Year	Album	Chart positions UK Albums Chart
1995	Bite It	71
1998	Big Wow	—

=== Extended plays ===
Year	Album	Chart positions
1994	No Time	—
1995	Maximum Whiteout	—
1995	Young Tribe Rule	—
1997	Kickout	—

=== Singles ===
Year	A-side	B-side(s)	Chart positions UK Singles chart
1991	"The Next Big Thing"	"Orange Overdrive"	—
1994	"No Time"	"U Drag Me" (version) · "Get Me Through"	83
1994	"Starrclub"	"Higher" · "And I Believe"	80
1994	"Detroit"	"Just Passin' Through, Kid" · "Dee Troyt"	73
1994	"Van Song"	"Rocks Off" (Rolling Stones cover)	—
1995	"Jackie's Racing"	"Cousin Jane" · "So Confused"	72
