= Rapmasters: From Tha Priority Vaults, Vol. 8 =

Compilation album by Various Artists
- Released: August 5, 1997
- Recorded: 1988–1996
- Genre: West Coast hip hop, gangsta rap
- Length: 33:37
- Label: Priority Records
- Producer: Dr. Dre, Shawn J Period, DJ Pooh, San Man, LP, Brotha Lynch Hung, Courtney Branch, Tracy Kendrick, Studio Ton, Joe Quixxx, Rhythum D

Various Artists chronology
Rapmasters: From Tha Priority Vaults, Vol. 7 (1997)	Rapmasters: From Tha Priority Vaults, Vol. 8 (1997)

Professional ratings
Review scores
Source	Rating
AllMusic	3/5 stars

Rapmasters: From Tha Priority Vaults, Vol. 8 is the eighth and final volume in the Rapmasters budget compilation series that Priority Records released throughout 1996 and 1997. As usual, there is no fully uncut explicit version of this volume available meaning that all songs appear here in their censored versions. This volume is the shortest-running volume of the entire series.

== Track listing ==
1. Appetite For Destruction (N.W.A)
2. Place To Be (Heltah Skeltah)
3. The Predator (Ice Cube)
4. I Must Stand (Ice-T)
5. Datz Real Gangsta (Brotha Lynch Hung)
6. Southern Girl (Lil 1/2 Dead)
7. She's So Tight (The Conscious Daughters)
8. 6 Figures and Up (The B.U.M.S)
9. Learnin' The Game (Me & My Cousin)
