= Rapmasters: From Tha Priority Vaults, Vol. 7 =

Compilation album by Various Artists
- Released: August 5, 1997
- Recorded: 1988–1996
- Genre: West Coast hip hop, Southern hip hop, gangsta rap
- Length: 38:21
- Label: Priority Records
- Producer: Al Eaton, Dr. Dre, Mo B. Dick, Paris, Naughty By Nature, E-A-Ski, Lamont Bird Holdby, Ras Kass, Courtney Branch, Tracy Kendrick

Various Artists chronology
| Rapmasters: From Tha Priority Vaults, Vol. 6 (1997) | Rapmasters: From Tha Priority Vaults, Vol. 7 (1997) | Rapmasters: From Tha Priority Vaults, Vol. 8 (1997) |

Professional ratings
Review scores
| Source | Rating |
|---|---|
| AllMusic | 3/5 stars |

Rapmasters: From Tha Priority Vaults, Vol. 7 is the seventh volume of an eight volume budget compilation series released by Priority Records throughout 1996 and 1997. Like almost all of the six previous volumes, no fully uncut explicit version of this release exists meaning that all songs appear here in their censored versions.

== Track listing ==
1. When They Gone (Master P)
2. Straight Outta Compton (N.W.A)
3. Gangstafied (Kane & Abel Featuring Master P and Mo B. Dick)
4. It's Real (Paris)
5. Only If You Want It (Eazy-E)
6. Blast If I Have To (E-A-Ski)
7. Drama (Ras Kass Featuring Coolio)
8. Steel On a Mission '96 (Lil 1/2 Dead)
9. You Want Me (The Conscious Daughters)
