= Rapmasters: From Tha Priority Vaults, Vol. 6 =

Compilation album by Various Artists
- Released: August 5, 1997
- Recorded: 1988–1996
- Genre: West Coast hip hop, gangsta rap
- Length: 39:29
- Label: Priority Records
- Producer: DJ Pooh, JT The Bigga Figga, Shaleek, Vooodu, Rhythum D, 88 X Unit, Dr. Dre, Courtney Branch, Tracy Kendrick, Mike Mosley, Sam Bostic

Various Artists chronology
Rapmasters: From Tha Priority Vaults, Vol. 5 (1996)	Rapmasters: From Tha Priority Vaults, Vol. 6 (1997)	Rapmasters: From Tha Priority Vaults, Vol. 7 (1997)

Professional ratings
Review scores
Source	Rating
AllMusic	3/5 stars

Rapmasters: From Tha Priority Vaults, Vol. 6 is the sixth volume of an eight volume budget compilation series that Priority Records released throughout 1996 and 1997. As is the standard with almost all volumes in the series, This was only released in an edited version that censored many of the profanities that originally appeared in these songs.

== Track listing ==
1. It Was a Good Day (Ice Cube) – 04:23
2. Peep Game (JT The Bigga Figga Featuring D-Moe) – 03:43
3. Calm Before Da Storm (O.G.C.) – 03:29
4. The Evil That Men Do (Ras Kass) – 04:22
5. Red Carpet (Me & My Cousin) – 03:37
6. On Them Thangs (Mack 10) – 05:10
7. Radio (Eazy-E) – 05:01
8. Dead Men Can't Rap (Lil 1/2 Dead) – 05:05
9. Gamers (The Conscious Daughters) – 04:39
