= Big Wow =

Studio album by Whiteout
- Released: 8 June 1998
- Recorded: 1997–1998; Bark Studio (London); Park Lane Studio (Glasgow)
- Genre: Rock, indie rock, Britpop
- Length: 44:16
- Label: Yoyo
- Producer: Oronsay Avenue, Brian O'Shaughnessy, Kenny Paterson

Whiteout chronology
Bite It (1995)	Big Wow (1998)

Singles from Big Wow
- 1. "Kickout" Released: 1997

Professional ratings
Review scores
Source	Rating
The Great Indie Discography	4/10 stars

Big Wow is the second album by Scottish rock band Whiteout, released in 1998 (see 1998 in music). Andrew Jones and Stuart Smith—who were members of Whiteout when they started out in 1994—had left the band after the release of their first full-length album, Bite It, in 1995. Warren McIntyre took over on vocals for a run of gigs, then the two remaining members, Paul Carroll and Eric Lindsay, continued as a three-piece with original (pre-1994) drummer Mark Fairhurst who is named "Fudge" in the album liner notes, although Jim McDermott was drafted in for the majority of Big Wow. Carroll, Lindsay and Fairhurst continued gigging adding Eric Russell on keys and finally folding in 1999 despite much new material.

== Track listing ==
All songs written by Carroll/Lindsay

1. "Kickout" – 3:36
2. "Heaven Sent" – 3:28
3. "Selling Up" – 3:25
4. "Through All the Rain" – 5:49
5. "435" – 4:28
6. "I Don't Wanna Hear About It" – 2:28
7. "Running for Cover" – 3:34
8. "Out on the Town" – 4:43
9. "Take It with Ease" – 3:09
10. "Get Back Whatcha Give" – 3:37
11. "Back Where I Used to Be" – 5:56

The Japanese edition features two additional tracks:

12. "No Money, No Honey" – 3:44
13. "To Carry Us Through" – 2:50

== Personnel ==
- Paul Carroll – vocals, bass, piano, organ, acoustic guitar
- Eric Lindsay – vocals, guitar
- Mark Fairhurst – drums (on tracks 4 and 5)

Additional personnel

- Jim McDermott – drums on all tracks except 4 and 5
- Natalie Box – strings on tracks 4, 7 and 11
- Rebecca Chambers – strings on tracks 4, 7 and 11
- Antonia Fuchs – strings on tracks 4, 7 and 11
- Simon Trentham – strings on tracks 4, 7 and 11
- Gerry Hogan – pedal steel on track 7
- John Williams – mellotron on track 11

== Production ==
- Producer: Oransay Avenue
- Producer: Brian O'Shaughnessy
- Producer: Kenny Paterson (only track 1)
- Mixer: Brian O'Shaughnessy
- Engineer: Brian O'Shaughnessy
- Engineer: Kenny Paterson
- Assistant engineer: Paul Middleton
- String arrangement: Natalie Box
- Mastering: David Fisher at Waterfront
- Cover design: Embryo Graphics
