= Steel on a Mission =

Studio album by Lil 1/2 Dead
- Released: May 21, 1996
- Recorded: 1995–1996
- Studio: Westlake Audio (Los Angeles, California); Total Trak Sound
- Genre: G-funk; gangsta rap; hardcore hip hop; horrorcore
- Length: 44:43
- Label: Priority
- Producer: Tracy Kendrick (also exec.); Courtney Branch (also exec.); Kenneth "K-Phlx" Manning; Damon Rose; Warryn Campbell

Lil 1/2 Dead chronology
The Dead Has Arisen (1994)	Steel on a Mission (1996)	Dead Serious (2012)

Singles from Steel on a Mission
- 1. "Southern Girl" Released: April 16, 1996

Professional ratings
Review scores
Source	Rating
AllMusic	2.5/5 stars
RapReviews	6/10

Steel on a Mission is the second studio album by American rapper Lil 1/2 Dead from Long Beach, California. It was released on May 21, 1996, through Priority Records. Recording sessions took place at Westlake Audio in Los Angeles and at Total Trak Sound with producers Courtney Branch and Tracy Kendrick. It features guest appearances from Chaos and Quicc 2 Mac of Hostyle, Tha Chill of Compton's Most Wanted, Baby Girl and Tyme 4 Change. The album peaked at #47 on the Top R&B/Hip-Hop Albums and #23 on the Top Heatseekers, and the single "Southern Girl" made it to #38 on the Hot Rap Singles.

== Track listing ==
No.	Title	Length
1.	"Steel on a Mission '96"	4:04
2.	"Low Down" (featuring Quicc 2 Mac)	4:23
3.	"Southern Girl"	4:03
4.	"Back in the Day"	4:43
5.	"Givin' It Up" (featuring Hostyle)	5:08
6.	"Young HD"	4:29
7.	"If You Don't Know" (featuring Hostyle)	4:26
8.	"Still Rollin'" (featuring Quicc 2 Mac)	4:36
9.	"Gotta Git Cha" (featuring Tha Chill)	4:22
10.	"Cavvy Sounds" (featuring Chaos & Baby Girl)	4:29
Total length:		44:43

== Charts ==
Chart (1996)	Peak position
US Top R&B/Hip-Hop Albums (Billboard)	47
US Heatseekers Albums (Billboard)	23
