= Insane Poetry =

American hip hop musical group

- Origin: Los Angeles, California
- Genres: Horrorcore
- Years active: 1988–present
- Labels: Nastymix/Ichiban; Nitebreed/React; Grim Reality; Long Range/Koch; Never So Deep; Lyrical Snuff
- Members: Cyco
- Past members: DJ Streek; Shakespear the One-Man Riot; EmDee; Pope
- Website: http://gorehopshop.bigcartel.com/artist/insane-poetry

Insane Poetry is an American hip hop group from Los Angeles, California. Formed in 1988, it is considered to be one of the first horrorcore groups. Today, Cyco, under the alias Insane Poetry, is a solo artist

== History ==
The group was formed by Cyco, then known as Psycho (born Andrew "Drew" Holiman, on April 29, 1967, in Los Angeles, California), after he was hired as a disc jockey at a Los Angeles radio station, KDAY. With members DJ Streek and Shakespear the One-Man Riot, Insane Poetry released its debut single, "Twelve Strokes Till Midnight," in 1988. After replacing Shakespear with Em-Dee, Insane Poetry signed with Nastymix/Ichiban Records through an association with emcee Rodney O and released its debut album, Grim Reality, in 1992, which peaked at #98 on the Billboard Top R&B/Hip-Hop Albums chart.

After Nastymix went out of business, Insane Poetry signed with independent React Records, which released its second album, Blacc Plague, in 1996, but disagreements over promotion and support led the group to leave the label. In 1998, Cyco appeared on Vanilla Ice's Hard to Swallow album, followed by collaborations with M-Boogie, Dilated Peoples, and DJ Revolution.

In 2001, Cyco hooked up with producer Jason "JP Tha Hustler" Pearl and together they formed Grim Reality Entertainment. In 2003, Insane Poetry released Faith in Chaos. In 2007, the group released Fallen From Grace with nationwide distribution through Long Range/Koch Records. It was announced at Black X-Mas 2010 that he was part of Lyrikal Snuff Productions.

Insane Poetry collaborated on a song with Las Vegas-based hip hop group War Paint, titled "Wasted", in 2013 on the Bloodstepp track "Underground All-Stars (The Anthem)" from the album Bass And Bubblegum and in 2014 on Ware-Wolff's "Lycanthropy (TMTM Remix)". Insane Poetry has also been on numerous Grim Reality Entertainment CDs since, including Grim Reality Entertainment Music Collection Vol. 1, GRE for the Radio Music Collection Vol. 2, Corporate Takeover, New Breed, JP tha Hustler's 100% Hardcore, VD's Hardcore Hip Hop, and Nekro G's Reel Street Musik

In August of 2026 Insane Poetry released his album “Killing The Mic” primarily produced by Gibby Stites under Lyrikal Snuff Productions.

== Discography ==
Studio albums

- Grim Reality (1992)
- Blacc Plague (1996)
- Faith in Chaos (Book of Revelations) (2003)
- Fallen from Grace (2007)
- Cyco the Snuff Reels (2008)
- Killaborations (2014)
- The Snuff Reels Director's Cut: The Birth Of Richard Hansen (2017)
- Wicked Killagraphy (2021)
- Violent Art (2022)
- The Summoning Vol. 1 (2024)
- Killing The Mic (2026)
- The Heretic (TBA)

Collaborative albums

- Random Acts of Violence (as M.M.M.F.D. with Scum of LSP) (2013)
- Unsubs (as M.M.M.F.D. with Scum of LSP) (2016)
- Team Guillotine (with JP Tha Hustler of LSP) (2018)
- Butcher Brothaz (as M.M.M.F.D. with Scum of LSP) (2018)
- Deadly Drug (as M.M.M.F.D. with Scum of LSP) (2020)
- Deadly Drug 2: Ovadoze (as M.M.M.F.D. with Scum of LSP) (2023)
- Horrorcore (as M.M.M.F.D. with Scum of LSP) (2025)

Compilation albums

- History: Rare & Unreleased (2008)
- The Best of Insane Poetry (2012)

Extended plays

- Violent Art EP (2016)

Mixtapes

- Insane Poetry Presents Prelude to Edgar Allan Holiman — Creative Destruction The Mixtape (2012)
