= Rapmasters: From Tha Priority Vaults, Vol. 4 =

Compilation album by Various Artists
- Released: November 12, 1996
- Recorded: 1987–1995
- Genre: West Coast hip hop, gangsta rap
- Label: Priority Records
- Producer: Sir Jinx, Ice Cube, DJ Aladdin, Crazy Toones, WC, Dr. Dre, Poisen Ivey, Jammin' James Carter, Paris, Erick Sermon, DJ Bobcat

Various Artists chronology
| Rapmasters: From Tha Priority Vaults, Vol. 3 (1996) | Rapmasters: From Tha Priority Vaults, Vol. 4 (1996) | Rapmasters: From Tha Priority Vaults, Vol. 5 (1996) |

Professional ratings
Review scores
| Source | Rating |
|---|---|
| AllMusic | 4/5 stars |

Rapmasters: From Tha Priority Vaults, Vol. 4 is the fourth volume of an eight volume budget compilation series released by Priority Records throughout 1996 and 1997. Like the previous volume, This volume was issued in a fully uncut explicit version [as well as an edited version]. On the edited version, Ice Cube's The Wrong Nigga To Fuck Wit is replaced with Ice Cube's Amerikkka's Most Wanted.

== Track listing ==
1. The Wrong Nigga To Fuck Wit (Ice Cube)
2. Mozi-Wozi (Mack 10)
3. Funky Song (Low Profile)
4. Out On a Furlough (WC and the Maad Circle)
5. 8 Ball (N.W.A)
6. Living In The Ghetto (KMC)
7. One Time Fo' Ya Mind (Paris)
8. Jane (EPMD)
9. Behind The Scenes (MC Ren)
