= Detroit (song) =

Single by Whiteout

from the album Bite It
- B-side: "Just Passin' Through, Kid"; "Dee Troyt"
- Released: September 1994
- Recorded: 1994 at Park Lane Studio (Glasgow) and Bark Studio (London)
- Genre: Rock, indie rock, Britpop
- Length: 12:22
- Label: Silvertone
- Songwriter(s): Carroll/Lindsay/Smith/Jones
- Producer(s): Oronsay Avenue, Kenny Paterson, Brian O'Shaughnessy

Whiteout singles chronology
"Starrclub" (1994)	"Detroit" (1994)	"Jackie's Racing" (1995)

"Detroit" is a song by Scottish rock band Whiteout, released as their third single in 1994 (see 1994 in music). Although it was not part of the band's debut album Bite It (1995) on its initial release, there is an expanded edition available which has "Detroit" added as a 13th track. The B-side "Dee Troyt" is a slowed-down, almost acoustic version of the single's title track with some alternate lyrics and layered harmonies reminiscent of The Beach Boys. The second B-side, "Just Passin' Through, Kid"—a country-esque instrumental song—also appeared as the last track on the Japanese EP No Time.

== Track listing ==
CD and 12" vinyl:

1. "Detroit" – 4:38
2. "Just Passin' Through, Kid" – 3:39
3. "Dee Troyt" – 4:05

7" vinyl and cassette:

1. "Detroit" – 4:38
2. "Dee Troyt" – 4:05

All songs written by Carroll/Lindsay/Smith/Jones

== Personnel ==
- Andrew Jones – vocals
- Eric Lindsay – guitar, backing vocals
- Paul Carroll – bass, backing vocals
- Stuart Smith – drums

Additional personnel

- Those Sweet Soul Swinging Singing Sisters Deborah & Maria – backing vocals on "Detroit"
- Brian Oblivion – slide guitar on "Just Passin' Through, Kid"

== Production ==
- Production: Oransay Avenue and Kenny Paterson (track 1)
- Production: Oransay Avenue and Brian O'Shaughnessy (tracks 2 and 3)
- Engineering and mix: Kenny Paterson at Park Lane Studio (track 1)
- Engineering and mix: Brian O'Shaughnessy at Bark Studio (tracks 2 and 3)
- Assistant engineer: Alex Jones (tracks 2 and 3)
- Mastering: Porkey's
- Cover design: George Miller
- Photography: Elaine Constantine

== Chart positions ==
Chart	Date of Entry	Peak position
UK Singles Chart	1994-09-24	73
