= Detroit Cyclecar =

Defunct American motor vehicle manufacturer

Detroit Cyclecar Company

Overview
- Also called: Detroit Cyclecar, Detroit Speedster, Little Detroit Speedster, Saginaw Speedster
- Production: 1913–1914

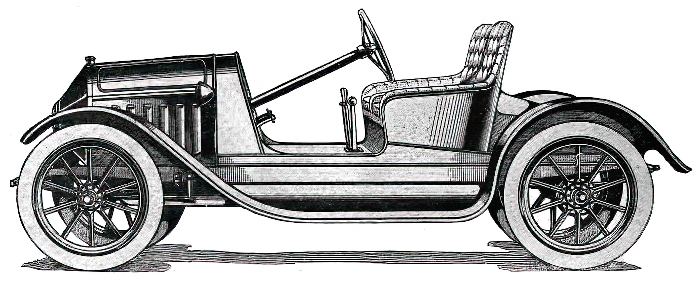
1914 Little Detroit Speedster 12 H.P.

The Detroit Cyclecar was a cyclecar manufactured in Detroit, Michigan by the Detroit Cyclecar Company from 1913 to 1914 and Saginaw, Michigan in 1914.

== History ==
The cyclecar, also marketed as the Detroit Speedster and Little Detroit Speedster, was designed by Ernest Weigold, former engineer for the E.R. Thomas Motor Company, and chief engineer for Herreshoff.

Heavier than most cyclecars at 850 lb (390 kg), it was offered with a four-cylinder water-cooled engine of 91 cu in (1.49 L), costing $375 (equivalent to $12,216 in 2025). The car was a side by side two-seat roadster on a 92-inch wheelbase.

In 1914 the company relocated to Saginaw, Michigan, where A. R. Thomas promoted a new cyclecar company. The car was built at the Brooks Manufacturing Company factory and known as the Saginaw Speedster for a short time.
