= Bite It =

Studio album by Whiteout
- Released: 19 June 1995
- Recorded: 1994–1995; Bark Studio (London); Park Lane Studio (Glasgow); Battery Studios (London)
- Genre: Rock; indie rock; Britpop; folk rock
- Length: 55:30
- Label: Silvertone
- Producer: Oronsay Avenue; Brian O'Shaughnessy; Kenny Paterson; Sarah Bedingham

Whiteout chronology
Bite It (1995)	Big Wow (1998)

Singles from Bite It
- 1. "No Time" Released: January 1994; 2. "Detroit" Released: September 1994; 3. "Jackie's Racing" Released: February 1995

Professional ratings
Review scores
Source	Rating
AllMusic	2/5 stars
The Great Indie Discography	4/10 stars
NME	6/10 stars
Select	3/5 stars

Bite It is the debut album by Scottish rock band Whiteout, released in 1995 (see 1995 in music). The album includes two of the overall four previously released singles by the band, namely "No Time" and "Jackie's Racing". Another single, "Detroit", was not part of the original album but added as a bonus track to certain subsequent releases of Bite It, making "Starrclub" the only Whiteout single not released on a proper album (although it was re-released on the Japanese EP No Time). The album was available on both CD and vinyl.

== Track listing ==
All songs written by Carroll/Lindsay/Smith/Jones, except where noted.

1. "Thirty Eight" – 4:04
2. "No Time" – 3:50
3. "We Should Stick Together" – 3:17
4. "Jackie's Racing" – 3:18
5. "Shine on You" – 4:32
6. "No More Tears" (Lindsay/Cushnaghan/Carroll/Jones) – 6:42
7. "Altogether" – 3:28
8. "U Drag Me" – 4:56
9. "Baby Don't Give Up on Me Yet" – 5:54
10. "You Left Me Seeing Stars" – 5:08
11. "Everyday" – 4:36
12. "Untitled" – 5:45

There is a version of the album that contains a 13th track:

13. "Detroit" – 4:37

The Japanese edition features two additional tracks:

13. "Van Song" – 2:23
14. "Detroit" – 4:36

"Van Song" was also available as a limited 7-inch vinyl single backed with a cover version of the Rolling Stones' "Rocks Off". This single was never released commercially but given away as a promotional item. The first 100 concert attendees at each venue on Whiteout's tour in autumn of 1994 received the single for free.

== Personnel ==
- Andrew Jones – vocals
- Eric Lindsay – guitar, backing vocals
- Paul Carroll – bass, backing vocals
- Stuart Smith – drums

Additional personnel

- Lee Skelley – Hammond organ on "Shine on You"
- Phil Kane – piano on "Altogether", Hammond organ and piano on "No Time"
- Those Sweet Soul Swinging Singing Sisters Deborah & Maria - backing vocals on "Altogether"
- NFL Horns – brass on "Everyday"
- The Subway Soopa-Strinz – strings on "Untitled"

== Production ==
- Producer: Oransay Avenue (all tracks)
- Producer: Brian O'Shaughnessy (tracks 1, 3, 6, 8, 10, 11, 12)
- Producer: Kenny Paterson (tracks 2, 4, 7, 9, 12, 13)
- Producer: Sarah Bedingham (track 5)
- Mixer: Brian O'Shaughnessy
- Assistant engineer: Alex Jones (tracks 1, 3, 6, 8, 10)
- Assistant engineer: Jim Brumby (track 11)
- Cover design: George Miller
- Photography: Elaine Constantine
- Video stills: Douglas Hart, Momentum Video

== Chart positions ==
=== Album ===
Chart	Date of Entry	Peak position
UK Albums Chart	1995-07-01	71

=== Singles ===
Year	Song	Date of Entry	Peak position UK Singles chart
1994	"No Time"	1994-02-19	83
1994	"Detroit"	1994-09-24	73
1995	"Jackie's Racing"	1995-02-18	72
