= Downing-Detroit =

Defunct American motor vehicle manufacturer

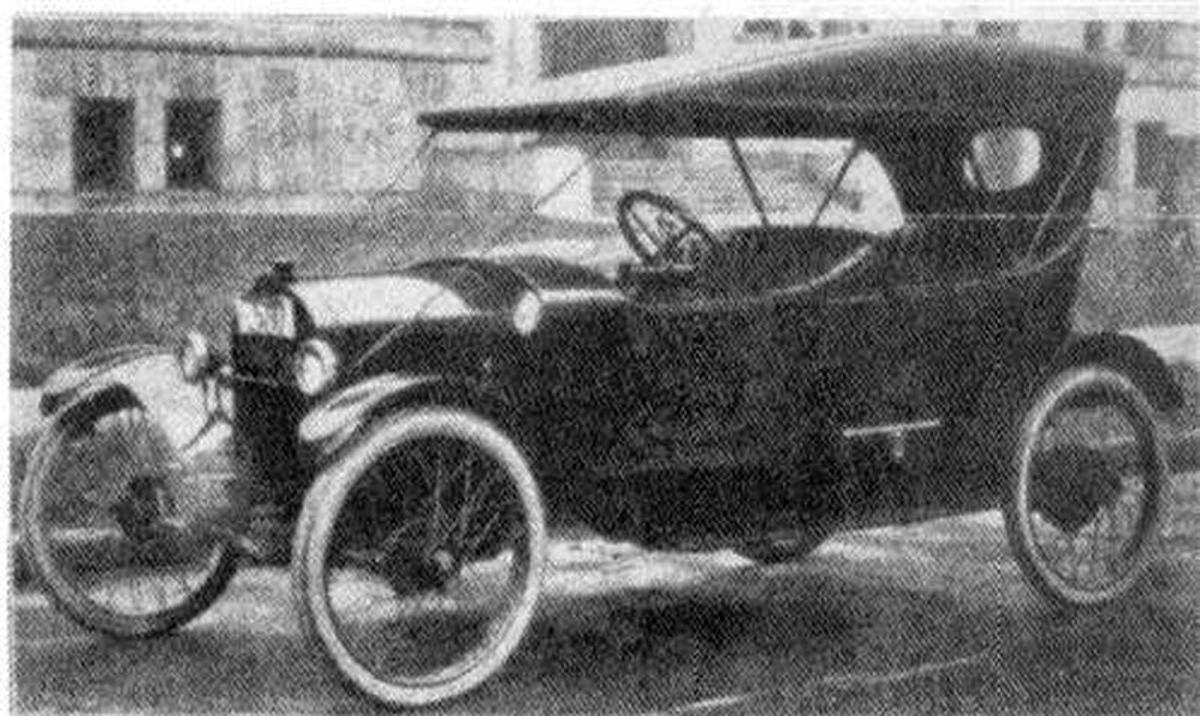
Downing-Detroit Cyclecar

The Downing-Detroit was an American cyclecar manufactured in Detroit, Michigan by the Downing Motor Company from 1913 to 1915. The Downing was offered as two models. The first was a two-passenger air-cooled V-twin engine of 13 hp. The second model was a light car with a water-cooled four-cylinder engine and a three-speed transmission.

== See also ==
- Brass Era car
