= Elementalz =

Studio album by The Brotherhood
- Released: January 9, 1996
- Recorded: 1995
- Genre: Conscious hip hop, Boom bap
- Length: 75:52
- Label: Virgin
- Producer: The Underdog

Professional ratings
Review scores
Source	Rating
Muzik	4/5 stars

Elementalz, is the debut album by British hip hop group The Brotherhood. it was released on January 9, 1996, through Virgin.

== Track listing ==
1. One - 5:17
2. Alphabetical Response - 5:23
3. Nothing In Particular - 4:21
4. Mad Headz - 5:22
5. On The Move - 4:53
6. Goin' Undaground - 6:29
7. Punk Funk - 4:14
8. You Gotta Life - 4:37
9. One Shot - 4:29
10. Incredible - 5:28
11. Clunk Click - 5:29
12. Nominate - 5:02
13. Dark Stalkers - 4:38
14. British Accent - 4:30
15. Pride (Revisited) - 5:40

== Samples ==
- "One"
  - "Starless" by King Crimson
  - "Is It Him or Me" by Jackie Jackson
- "Nothing In Particular"
  - "Constant Elevation" by Gravediggaz
- "Mad Headz"
  - "Why Can't People Be Colors Too?" by The Whatnauts
  - "Dancing In Outer Space" by Atmosfear
  - "Song for Chicago" by Malcolm McLaren
- "Goin' Undaground"
  - "Light My Fire" by Brian Auger's Oblivion Express
- "You Gotta Life"
  - "Get Out of My Life, Woman" by Iron Butterfly
  - "Brooklyn Battles" by Masta Ace
- "One Shot"
  - "Mysterious Vibes" by Sunburst
- "Incredible"
  - "It's A New Day" by Skull Snaps
  - "How Many MC's" by Black Moon
- "Clunk Click"
  - "Moon in June" by Soft Machine
- "British Accent"
  - "Funky Rhymes, Funky Styles" by PD3
