= No Time (Whiteout song) =

Single by Whiteout

from the album Bite It
- B-side: "U Drag Me" (version); "Get Me Through"
- Released: January 1994
- Recorded: 1994 at Park Lane Studio (Glasgow)
- Genre: Rock, indie rock, Britpop
- Length: 12:04
- Label: Silvertone
- Songwriter(s): Carroll/Lindsay/Smith/Jones
- Producer(s): Oronsay Avenue, Kenny Paterson

Whiteout singles chronology
| "No Time" (1994) | "Starrclub" (1994) |

No Time is a song by Scottish rock band Whiteout, released as their debut single in 1994. Whiteout performed the song live on Channel 4's popular TV series The Word on 28 January 1994. Later that year, "No Time" also appeared as the title track on an EP of the same name which was released exclusively in Japan. In February 1995, the track was released once again as part of the full-length album Bite It. The B-side "U Drag Me" is also featured on that album, but in a different version as the one included on this single.

== Track listing ==
CD and 12" vinyl:

1. "No Time" – 3:55
2. "U Drag Me" (version) – 4:44
3. "Get Me Through" – 3:25

7" vinyl and cassette:

1. "No Time" – 3:55
2. "Get Me Through" – 3:25

All songs written by Carroll/Lindsay/Smith/Jones

== Personnel ==
- Andrew Jones – vocals
- Eric Lindsay – guitar, backing vocals
- Paul Carroll – bass, backing vocals
- Stuart Smith – drums

Additional personnel

- Phil Kane – Hammond organ and piano on "No Time"

== Production ==
- Production: Kenny Paterson and Oransay Avenue
- Engineering and mix: Kenny Paterson at Park Lane Studio
- Mastering: Porkey's
- Cover design: Fin (original concept: George Miller)

== Chart positions ==
| Chart | Date of Entry | Peak position |
|---|---|---|
| UK Singles Chart | 19 February 1994 | 83 |
