= Rapmasters: From Tha Priority Vaults, Vol. 2 =

Compilation album by Various Artists
- Released: August 26, 1996
- Recorded: 1988–1994
- Genre: West Coast hip hop, East Coast hip hop, gangsta rap
- Length: 35:27
- Label: Priority Records
- Producer: Erick Sermon, QDIII, Erich Hype Dog Krause, Dr. Dre, Nice & Smooth, Mr. Woody, Paris, Michael Wilson (Exec.), Scott Young (Exec.)

Various Artists chronology
Rapmasters: From Tha Priority Vaults, Vol. 1 (1996)	Rapmasters: From Tha Priority Vaults, Vol. 2 (1996)	Rapmasters: From Tha Priority Vaults, Vol. 3 (1996)

Professional ratings
Review scores
Source	Rating
AllMusic	3/5 stars

Rapmasters: From Tha Priority Vaults, Vol. 2 is the second of an eight-volume budget Compilation series that Priority Records released throughout 1996 and 1997. As with the previous volume, Songs that had profane lyrics appeared in their censored versions however, Mad Flava's Feel Tha Flava and The Conscious Daughters' We Roll Deep both appear here fully uncut and uncensored.

== Track listing ==
1. Ghetto Bird (Ice Cube)
2. Feel Tha Flava (Mad Flava)
3. The Big Payback (EPMD)
4. Eazy-Duz-It (Eazy-E)
5. Early To Rise (Nice & Smooth)
6. Chocolate City (Da Lench Mob)
7. We Roll Deep (The Conscious Daughters)
8. Gangsta Gangsta (N.W.A)
9. Back In The Days (Paris)
