= Rapmasters: From Tha Priority Vaults, Vol. 3 =

Compilation album by Various Artists
- Released: October 24, 1996
- Recorded: 1988–1995
- Genre: West Coast hip hop, gangsta rap
- Label: Priority Records
- Producer: Ice Cube, The Boogie Men, Erick Sermon, Sir Jinx, Tootie, DJ Aladdin, Dr. Dre, D'Maq, Laylaw, DJ Daryl

Various Artists chronology
Rapmasters: From Tha Priority Vaults, Vol. 2 (1996)	Rapmasters: From Tha Priority Vaults, Vol. 3 (1996)	Rapmasters: From Tha Priority Vaults, Vol. 4 (1996)

Rapmasters: From Tha Priority Vaults, Vol. 3 is the third of an eight volume budget Compilation series released on October 24, 1996 by Priority Records. Unlike the first two volumes, This volume [and the following volume] was issued in a fully uncut explicit version [as well as an edited version].

== Critical response ==
Leo Stanley of Allmusic wrote: Rapmasters, Vol. 3 is an adequate collection of hardcore rap, featuring cuts by EPMD ("Get the Bozack"), Ice Cube ("Givin' Up the Nappy Dug-Out"), NWA ("3 the Hard Way"), WC and the Madd Circle ("Dress Code"), 415 ("Nu Niggaz on the Blokkk") and Ice-T ("I Ain't New Ta This"). Though many of these weren't even hits, it's still a good hardcore sampler for casual fans, even though it was thrown together haphazardly.

== Track listing ==
1. Wanted Dead (Mack 10)
2. Givin' Up The Nappy Dug Out (Ice Cube)
3. Get The Bozack (EPMD)
4. Dress Code (WC and the Maad Circle)
5. Roll Em Up (Don Jagwarr)
6. I Ain't New Ta This (Ice-T)
7. 3 The Hard Way (Fila Fresh Crew)
8. Level-N-Service (Anotha Level Featuring Ice Cube)
9. Nu Niggaz On Tha Blokkk (415)
