= Detroit (Wheeler Manufacturing) =

Defunct American motor vehicle manufacturer

The Detroit was an automobile manufactured in Detroit, Michigan by the Wheeler Manufacturing Company in 1904. The Detroit was a five-seater tonneau with an entrance in the rear. It had a 35 hp opposed two-cylinder engine, claimed to produce 35 mph (56 km/h). It had a removable wood top, and was offered in either red or green, with yellow running gear.
