= Detroit-Oxford =

Defunct American motor vehicle manufacturer

The Detroit-Oxford was an American automobile manufactured in Oxford, Michigan by the Detroit-Oxford Motor Car Company from 1905 to 1906. The car used a two-cylinder, 16 hp water-cooled boxer engine. The five-seater touring version of the vehicle was doorless.
