= Blacc Plague =

Studio album by Insane Poetry
- Released: August 20, 1996
- Recorded: 1994–1996
- Genre: Hardcore hip hop, horrorcore
- Label: Nightbreed/React Recordings
- Producer: Cyco; DJ Streek; Lumbajak; Joe Cooley

Insane Poetry chronology
| Grim Reality (1992) | Blacc Plague (1996) | Faith in Chaos (Book of Revelations) (2003) |

Alternative Cover
- Deadly Virus Edition (2008 rerelease)

Blacc Plague is the second studio album by American hip hop group Insane Poetry, released in 1996. At the time of release, front man Psycho changed the spelling of his name to Cyco. In 2008, after acquiring the rights, the group re-released the album with several bonus tracks on its own Grim Reality Entertainment label.

== Track listing ==
| No. | Title | Music | Length |
|---|---|---|---|
| 1. | "Intro'" | DJ Streek | 2:11 |
| 2. | "Wrong Neck of Da Woodz" | Lumbajak | 4:15 |
| 3. | "Who Runs the Mutha Fucka" | Joe Cooley | 3:20 |
| 4. | "You Better Ask Somebody ’96" | Limbajak | 4:40 |
| 5. | "On Deadly Ground" | Cyco | 3:20 |
| 6. | "Mr. Swine" | Lumbajak | 3:21 |
| 7. | "Niggaz Only Live to Die" | Insane Poetry | 3:04 |
| 8. | "Home of the Body Bagz" | Cyco | 3:33 |
| 9. | "Killa Instinct" | Cyco | 3:47 |
| 10. | "In the Mouth of Maddness" | DJ Streek | 4:04 |
| 11. | "66.6 FM Radio Kill" | Cyco | 0:36 |
| 12. | "Mirror, Mirror" | Lumbajak | 3:45 |
| 13. | "How the Wicked Kick It'" | Cyco | 3:32 |
| 14. | "Outro'" | DJ Streek | 2:25 |
| Total length: | | | 49:18 |

2008 version

| No. | Title | Length |
|---|---|---|
| 1. | "Deadly Virus" | 1:22 |
| 2. | "Wrong Neck of the Woods" | 4:14 |
| 3. | "Who Runs the Mothafucka" | 3:55 |
| 4. | "You Better Ask Somebody" | 4:06 |
| 5. | "On Deadly Ground" | 3:12 |
| 6. | "Niggaz Only Live to Die" | 3:01 |
| 7. | "Home of the Bodybagz" | 3:31 |
| 8. | "Killa Instincts" | 3:45 |
| 9. | "In the Mouth of Madness" | 4:36 |
| 10. | "Mirror, Mirror" | 3:46 |
| 11. | "How the Wickit Kickit" | 3:31 |
| 12. | "City of the Damned (Remix)" | 2:06 |
| Total length: | | 41:05 |

== Samples ==
How the Wicked Kickit

- "Papa Was Too" by Joe Tex

In the Mouth of Maddness

- "B Side Wins Again" by Public Enemy

Who Runs the Mutha F***A

- "Funky Worm" by Ohio Players
- "More Bounce to the Ounce" by Zapp
