= Ill Biskits =

American hip-hop duo

Ill Biskits was an American underground hip-hop duo from Petersburg, Virginia composed of rappers Kleph Dollaz (born Darrell Durant) and Deeda (born Charles DeShields). In 2012, Darrell Durant died of a heart attack.

Ill Biskits released their first single, "God Bless Your Life", on Indie NYC label Khari Entertainment in 1994. The single contains the rare and much sought after B-Side track "22 Years", which was produced by Lord Finesse.

In 1995, after getting the attention of major label Atlantic Records, the duo signed an album deal, and went on to release 2 more singles.

== Discography ==
=== Albums ===
- Chronicle Of Two Losers: First Edition (1995)

=== Singles & EPs ===
- "God Bless Your Life / 22 Years / Beyond Understanding"
- "Chill Factor"

== Notes and references ==
=== Further reading ===
- https://www.google.ru/books/edition/Independent_As_F/2_9KEQAAQBAJ?hl=en&gbpv=1&dq=%22Ill+Biskits%22&pg=RA3-PT7&printsec=frontcover
- https://books.google.ru/books?id=ZA0EAAAAMBAJ&pg=PA100&dq=%22Ill+Biskits%22&hl=en&sa=X&ved=2ahUKEwii4P6r47KPAxXeHxAIHbJZN4sQ6AF6BAgGEAM#v=onepage&q=%22Ill%20Biskits%22&f=false
- https://books.google.ru/books?id=fQ8EAAAAMBAJ&pg=PA19&dq=%22Ill+Biskits%22&hl=en&sa=X&ved=2ahUKEwii4P6r47KPAxXeHxAIHbJZN4sQ6AF6BAgHEAM#v=onepage&q=%22Ill%20Biskits%22&f=false
- https://hiphopdx.com/news/id.20940/title.kleph-dollaz-of-90s-group-ill-biskits-death-confirmed-remembered-by-peers
