= The Brotherhood (rap group) =

UK hip-hop group

- Also known as: The Brotherhood VIP
- Origin: London, United Kingdom
- Genres: Hip hop
- Years active: 1984–1998
- Labels: Bite It! Recordings, Virgin, Blueprint
- Past members: Lorenzo/Mr Shylok; Son of Funk (DJ Diablo); DJ Pump Action; The Pioneer; The Mad Scientist; Mr Dexter; Mr Spice; DJ Hasty; Sir Yes; SecretGrooves

The Brotherhood were a pioneering UK hip-hop group with a solid following across the UK from the early 1990s. Releases with seminal UK Hip Hop label Bite It! Recordings were followed by a later move to Virgin. The 1996 album Elementalz has been described as one of the best UK hip hop albums ever made and "a staggering achievement in British music". The band finally split in 1998 and have since been credited as one of the most influential bands on the 90s UK hip-hop scene.

== History ==
=== 1984–89 The Brotherhood VIP ===
The band started in 1984 as a loose collective of around eight members called the Brotherhood VIP. VIP stood for "Vagabonds in Power", taken from a Fela Kuti record of the same name. They were a collective of rappers, dancers, graffiti artists, and DJ's who were black, white, Muslim and Jewish. The group included Aston Harvey, later known as DJ Hasty of the Freestylers, a Muslim Tanzanian MC named Sir Yes and a producer named Secretgrooves. In later interviews, founding member Lorenzo (Laurence Knopf, later called Mr Shylok) told the press the name had referred to the collective's ideal of "brotherhood between races". The Brotherhood VIP were a regular feature at North London underground hip hop jams and blues parties in the original 80s underground scene. Their mix tapes laced with rap circulated until 1989, when the original line up amicably parted ways. 1990 saw The Brotherhood, now including DJ/Producer Son of Funk (Jason Roth, later known as DJ Diablo, part of Roots Manuva's "Banana Clan" and featured in DJ MK's The Funhouse), continue to record demo tracks, assisted by production from Secretgrooves who had formed a new group called VIP with Sir Yes. In turn Lorenzo (Mr Shylok) helped out on production of VIP's demo tracks.

=== 1991: Descendants of the Holocaust EP ===
Original DJ and rapper members Lorenzo and DJ Pump Action (later known as DJ Crystl), plus Son of Funk (DJ Diablo) who had joined in 1990, and a later addition, The Pioneer, formed the next incarnation as The Brotherhood. Lorenzo had a friendship with a budding music producer Trevor "The Underdog" Jackson and together they produced the first Brotherhood 12" EP "Descendants of the Holocaust" in 1991. The tracks on the EP were originally produced by Lorenzo with Son of Funk. This release was the first release on the Bite It! Label, which grew to include label mates of the Brotherhood – "The Scientists of Sound" and "Little Pauly Ryan". On this track, the band drew on their shared Jewish legacy and the track reached number 8 in the UK's Echoes Hip Hop Chart. The media response was to present the band solely as a "Jewish Rap Band", with tag lines such as "the Jewish Public Enemy". A full-page piece in The Independent newspaper was the starting point for intense international media interest focused on the racial angle rather than the music. Framed as 'Jewish political protest rap' the Brotherhood were pursued by The New York Times, Def II's 'Reportage', NBC News, and other major media outlets. Within months, it was also widely reported that major American and UK labels rapidly despatched A&R men to live shows or directly to Bite It! looking to sign the band. The furore reached the stage where statements were issued to the press: "The fact that The Brotherhood are white and happen to be Jewish is an irrelevant point, we hope people listen to the music and think this is a good track”

While revenues from the US hip-hop scene dwarfed its UK underground cousin, the Brotherhood refused media appearances and deals which they felt were irrelevant to the music. Instead they remained at Bite It! Lorenzo told the press: "The Brotherhood are about a lot of things... what we really want to do is make very good, very credible rap. We wanna make tracks that even when you're totally knackered at a club, you get up and dance the whole track away, a track that makes you get up when you feel like sleeping. That's the bottom line.” There were concerns that involvement with larger players would detract from the music, plus reinforce the anti-Semitic stereotype that “Jews run the media”. Lorenzo would later cite the frustration and pressure created by the media's one-dimensional "Jewish rap band" response as a key factor in the band's split soon afterwards. “They didn’t want to know anything else. That's all they were really gonna write about.”

=== 1992 EP: Wayz Of The Wize ===
In 1992 DJ Pump Action left The Brotherhood to pursue a successful career in Drum & Bass as "DJ Crystl", signed to London Records, with later work as an acclaimed Drum & Bass producer. Around the same time, Lorenzo met Mr Dexter, a well-known DJ on the UK hip-hop scene, through a mutual friend, UK hip-hop artist DJ Pogo.

Mr Dexter had been a DJ/producer during the '80s with MC Blade and MC Merlin. He also recorded records with MC Kann in 1987 as D to the K – a double A side "Ease Up Your Mind" and "Hard But Live". Dexter had also produced 3 tracks as Positive Clan on the album HardCore One in 1988 with Dett Inc producer Sparki Ski. This featured D2 The K's Slow Jam Featuring MC Mello also of Dett and had cemented his place in the UK old school scene from the early Covent Garden days.

Within a year, their EP Wayz of the Wise immediately drew comparisons to American rappers House of Pain and Cypress Hill, from a UK press that the band and label claimed simply didn't understand UK hip hop. NME hailed it as “out one of the UK's finest hip hop singles ever… With its snarling, snorting brass riffs and swaggering drum thunder”. Other hip hop reviewers described it as "a big bass funk bubbler… at the forefront of intelligent rhymes and rhythms" with "solid hip hop beats", "a variety of rhyme styles…" and "slickly produced and fat full of beats ruff rap tune". On the flip side was ‘Break It Down', "a downtempo shuffler, with mad metal-like guitars arc cut up samples overlaid with scratch patterns" and 'Hit The Funk', "a slow fat and funky tune that again displays their inimitable rhyme skills". The release reached no. 4 in NME's Hip Hop Chart in November that year.

Soon after its release, The Pioneer chose to leave the band. The void was filled by a long time friend of Lorenzo, Mista Spyce (Chris Evans). Mista Spyce was a veteran of the old school London hip hop scene and came with a reputation earned from the early days of the scene with the street dance crew Warp Drive. At this point, Lorenzo changed his moniker to Mr Shylok and the band once again had a multi-cultural line up (mixed race, black and white). The line up remained the same throughout all subsequent releases.

=== 1993: The Brotherhood XXIII ===
An untitled white label was released in 1993, followed by another 12 tracks on The Brotherhood XXII EP featuring the singles "IMightSmokeASpliffButIWon'tSniff" and "Beats R Ruff N Rugged". It was received as "break-neck, razor-sharp rhymes", "best rhymes of all the British rap krus", "beats and screaming horns", and "killer jazzy tracks as well as plenty of beats in between". The UK-centric lyrical references “recognise the importance of trash culture in rap [e.g. I'm great, smashing. super like my man Jim Bowen]"; "To a backdrop of dirty blues scratches and samples they add a hard core B-line and rhymes guaranteed to make you think".

=== 1994: Hip Hop N' Rap (That's Where My Heart Is At) ===
The last 12" while signed to Bite It! was well received in the press as "a rougher affair with a L.O.T.U scratch" and vocals that again drew the now inevitable comparisons to both House of Pain and Cypress Hill. Unlike many other UK rappers of the time, The Brotherhood chose not to emulate an American accent. Rapping in their London accents, the band made a point of being unashamedly UK hip hop. Their attitude was characterised by Mr Dexter: “Basically that quite a lot of the British people that are doing and listening to rap aren’t either 100% into being British/listening to British rap or they’re still thinking that rapping American and about American things is the key, and that just p****s us off. I mean this is something we’ve been going on about for a long time now and we’ll keep on about it.” The band kept references strictly homegrown, as one journalist noted, "They're happy to be out about being British. Not interested in joining the pseudo-gangstas who take the American cue of "shoot' em, cracked out" lyrics...". NME would later point to the band "absorbing and exceeding the sonic invention of British instrumental hip hop, incorporating lyrics informed by a specifically British consciousness…[the band has] tapped into the long rich legacy of the British pop dissident, the maverick outsider".

=== 1995 + Elementalz ===
In 1995 the band signed to Virgin, with whom they released a 12" EP, Alphabetical Response, the same year, accompanied by a music video shot in mainly in black and white. The video features the band members rapping often in silhouette or side lit, with superimposed frames and graphics in a composition that achieves a stark noir feel. The contrast with the predominant commercial stateside rap video styles could not have been more pronounced. Nonetheless, comparisons to Cypress Hill and House of Pain continued throughout the band's career. NME described "Alphabetical Response" as a track "where a Speak and Spell Machine and eerie childlike synths weave through hotstepping beats". The success of Alphabetical Response was followed up with the track "One Shot", which probably remains the band's biggest release to date. The accompanying video (which was shot in Woolwich Arsenal) again featured stark, moody black and white shots of the band, whether following an apparent gunshot victim on a hospital trolley, or rapping in bleak sidelit settings. Locations include underneath a typical grey London skyline on the roof of a towerblock of some description. Their most critically acclaimed release came with the shape of their next album, 'Elementalz' in 1996, which took two years to produce. The track "Punk Funk" was released as a CD single and remix, followed up with a 12", Mad Headz, in the same year. NME and Melody Maker in particular responded to the album release by hailing the band as "the saviours of UK Hip Hop" and the album as "a staggering achievement in British music". Lyrically the album had an undeniable UK feel, "amid smoky loops and beats" with "a sumptuous blunted groove". UK samples included Brian Auger and Welsh diva Shirley Bassey, peppered with unique UK lyrical references: “It's about dealing with your own backyard because there’s enough here to deal with…We’re talking about vibes. We’re talking about Playschool, Jackanory, Chorlton & The Wheelies, you get me? When we say those references, it will tickle you”. The band's take on hip hop drew on the DIY ethos of original punk. "’We see UK hip-hop as having similar boundaries as punk... "When it first arrived in the '70s, you could put whatever you wanted on a record … They were talking about exactly what's going on. There's nothing like that at the moment, apart from hip-hop.". Mr Dexter cited a chance meeting with Johnny Rotten at an anti-apartheid rally ten years earlier as instrumental in keeping the sound real. "He said to me: 'If you're gonna rap, do it your way. Don't do it like an American. Stick to what you know about in England.’”.

During the same period, The Brotherhood were steadily gaining more recognition for their contribution to UK hip hop. The band won a Black Music Award for Best Rap Act while the cover art for Elementalz by Dave McKeen received widespread artistic acclaim. Virgin invested in producing videos for "Alphabetical Response", "Punk Funk' and One Shot, the style for each veering towards monochrome shots of the band, claustrophobic camera angles and grittier scenes. Despite large label backing, within a short period of time a series of events lead the band to move to the smaller Blueprint label. Rumours abounded about pressure to produce a more commercial sound and the band's need for more autonomy over their work. By now, the band had also suffered the untimely death of their manager, Marts Androps, who had also managed House DJ Roger Sanchez. Their next management company was headed by Neil Easterby, from the prominent NY hip hop & urban label Profile Records.

=== 1998: Dungeon Town EP ===
At Blueprint, the band released their last EP and music video Dungeon Town in 1998. Sampling the classic track "London Town", Dungeon Town remained true to the band's belief that rapping in their original London accent made for a more authentic groove. Lyrical references were pure London and the video stayed to the monochrome format but featured more unmistakably London scenes. These including a typical 'fry up' café meal, the dirty graffiti covered underground trains & buses, imposing dark subways and grimy streets. The EP was well received. "We've waited a long time for the Brotherhood comeback… The topic is London Tahn, one the boys are at home with, and their flow hasn't fallen off. Wicked. The two tracks on side B are more like their older tracks. Up-front beats and delivery to match. It's good to have them back." The band went into the studio again, and laid down some twenty tracks. However, shortly after the release, the Brotherhood officially split. Their final 20-track album remains unreleased to date, along with other rare tracks.

=== 2002: Hardcore Solution Part 2 LP ===
In 2002, Swiss label Hardcore One released a European Hardcore Rap compilation containing one of the tracks from the unreleased 1998 album, "Panicky".

=== 2016: Underground United Vol. 3 2xLP ===
At the end of 2016 Germany based label Underground United in conjunction with Naked Ape Records released another one of the 1998 album tracks, "The Return".

== Airplay, venues, tours and TV ==
Festivals included Reading, Quark, Phoenix, Finsbury Park, Barcelona Sónar, Cork Jazz and Roskilde. They also supported The Roots, The Beastie Boys, Guru and Genius/GZA at London's Astoria and Nightmares on Wax at Manchester's Hacienda. Cypress Hill, Blade, and the Wu Tang Clan UK airplay included hip hop shows Kiss FM'S Max & Dave Radio Show, BBC Radio 1's Tim Westward Show and Choice FM's DJ 279 Radio Show. TV appearances included MTV, The Box and the BBC's Behind The Headlines. A track called "Put Up Shut Up" was released on the 1993 hip-hop compilation EP, The British Underground.

== Band members: The Brotherhood ==
=== 1a. Brotherhood VIP Lineup ===
- Lorenzo,
- DJ Pump Action,
- DJ Hasty,
- Sir Yes,
- Secretgrooves,

=== 1b. Brotherhood Lineup ===
- Lorenzo,
- Son Of Funk (DJ Diablo),
- DJ Pump Action,
- The Pioneer
- The Mad Scientist

=== 2. Wayz of The Wize Lineup ===
- Lorenzo,
- The Pioneer,
- Mista Dexter

=== 3. Final Lineup ===
- Mr Shylok,
- Mista Dexter,
- Mista SPYCE

== Collaborations ==
1998's 12” Dungeon Town featured Light Of The World. In the same year, The Brotherhood featured on Project X's Mad Doctor X.

== Discography ==
- Descendents of the Holocaust EP (Bite It! Recordings – 1991, Cat. No. BITE 01)
- Descendents of the Holocaust (Remix) (Bite It! Recordings – 1991, Cat. No. BITE 02)
- Wayz of The Wise [12"] (Bite It! Recordings – 1992, Cat. No. BITE 06)
- Untitled '93 [LP] (White Label, Bite It! Recordings – 1993, Cat No. BITE 7 LP)
- XXIII EP [CD] (Bite It! Recordings – 1993, Cat. No. BITE CD7)
- Hip Hop N'Rap [12"] (That's Where My Heart Is At) (Bite It! Recordings – 1994, (Cat. No. BHOODT1)
- Hip Hop N'Rap (Straight Up Remix)|Hip Hop N'Rap [12"] (White Vinyl Promo, Bite It! Recordings – 1994, Cat. No. BHOODJ1)
- Crashing The System (Virgin 25th Anniversary Box Set, 1994)
- Alphabetical Response [12"] (Virgin, 1995, Cat No. BHOODT2)
- One Shot/Nothing in Particular [CD LP] (Virgin, 1996, Cat No. 7243 8 93355 2 1)
- Elementalz [CD LP] (Virgin, 1996, Cat No's CD BHOOD1, 7243 8 41324 2 2, CD BHOOD1)
- One Shot/Nothing in Particular (Remix)|One Shot/Nothing in Particular [12"] (Bite It! Recordings – Cat No's BHOODTX3 & BHOODTDJ3)
- Punk Funk [CD Single] (Virgin, 1996, Cat No. BHOODG4)
- Punk Funk (Remix) [CD Single] (Virgin/Bite It! Recordings, Cat No. BHOODT4)
- Mad Headz [12"] (Virgin, 1996, Cat No. HEADZDJ 96)
- Dungeon Town [EP]– (Blueprint, 1998, Cat No. BP0204)
