= The Dead Has Arisen =

Studio album by Lil 1/2 Dead
- Released: October 25, 1994
- Recorded: 1993–1994
- Studios: Westlake Audio (Los Angeles, California); Total Trak Sound
- Genres: West Coast hip hop; gangsta rap; G-funk; hardcore hip hop; horrorcore
- Length: 1:07:09
- Label: Priority
- Producers: Tracy Kendrick (also exec.); Courtney Branch (also exec.); Clever Kisum; Kenneth "K-Phlx" Manning; Devon Davis; Damon Rose; DJ Silk; N-Hance

Lil 1/2 Dead chronology
The Dead Has Arisen (1994)	Steel on a Mission (1996)

Singles from The Dead Has Arisen
- 1. "Had to Be a Hustler" Released: 1994; 2. "12 Pacofdoja" Released: 1994

Professional ratings
Review scores
Source	Rating
AllMusic	3/5 stars
RapReviews	7/10
The Source	2.5/5 stars

The Dead Has Arisen is the debut studio album by American rapper Lil 1/2 Dead from Long Beach, California. It was released on October 25, 1994, through Priority Records. Recording sessions took place at Westlake Audio in Los Angeles and at Total Trak Sound, with producers Courtney Branch and Tracy Kendrick. It features guest appearances from Chaos and Quicc 2 Mac of Hostyle, Tha Chill of Compton's Most Wanted, AMG and X-Con. The album peaked at number 39 on the Top R&B/Hip-Hop Albums chart and number 17 on the Top Heatseekers chart in the United States.

The album has been both praised and criticized for its likeness to Lil 1/2 Dead's Long Beach friend Warren G's debut album Regulate...G Funk Era. Whilst it failed to achieve similar success to its predecessors Dr. Dre's The Chronic and Snoop Dogg's Doggystyle, it did achieve nationwide and international fans, and Lil 1/2 Dead has been recognized as responsible for introducing and popularizing the smooth, laid-back rapping style along with Snoop Dogg and Warren G.

== Track listing ==
No.	Title	Writer(s)	Producer(s)	Length
1.	"Had to Be a Hustler"	Donald "Lil ½ Dead" Smith; Deyon Davis	Deyon Davis	4:34
2.	"12 Pacofdoja" (featuring Chaos & Quicc 2 Mac)	Lil ½ Dead; Russell Bates III; Leon James; Samuel L.; Macshack	Tracy Kendrick; Courtney "Tha Commander" Branch; Clever Kisum	5:14
3.	"Stz'll Got It" (featuring AMG & Tha Chill)	Lil ½ Dead; Jason Lewis; Russell Bates III; Vernon Johnson	Tracy Kendrick; Courtney "Tha Commander" Branch; Clever Kisum	5:39
4.	"Play 'Em or Spray 'Em" (Commercial Break)	Lil ½ Dead	Tracy Kendrick; Courtney "Tha Commander" Branch	4:29
5.	"Still on a Mission"	Lil ½ Dead; Russell Bates III	Tracy Kendrick; Courtney "Tha Commander" Branch; Clever Kisum	4:38
6.	"Dead Man Can't Rap"	Lil ½ Dead; Damon Rose; X-Con	Tracy Kendrick; Courtney "Tha Commander" Branch; Damon "Twin" Rose	5:53
7.	"Hustler's Interlude" (Commercial Break)	Lil ½ Dead	Tracy Kendrick; Courtney "Tha Commander" Branch	3:18
8.	"That Dope Nigga 1/2 Dead" (featuring Outlawz)	Lil ½ Dead; K-Phlx	Tracy Kendrick; Courtney "Tha Commander" Branch; K-Phlx	4:54
9.	"Eastside, Westside" (featuring Tha Chill)	Lil ½ Dead; Vernon Johnson; K-Phlx	Tracy Kendrick; Courtney "Tha Commander" Branch; K-Phlx	5:41
10.	"Now They Come Around" (featuring Chaos & Quicc 2 Mac)	Lil ½ Dead; Damon Rose	Tracy Kendrick; Courtney "Tha Commander" Branch; Damon "Twin" Rose	4:09
11.	"That's What You Get"	Lil ½ Dead; K-Phlx	Tracy Kendrick; Courtney "Tha Commander" Branch; K-Phlx	4:10
12.	"It Don't Stop"	Lil ½ Dead; N-Hance	Tracy Kendrick; Courtney "Tha Commander" Branch; N-Hance	4:37
13.	"You Know Me"	Lil ½ Dead; Tracy Kendrick	Tracy Kendrick; Courtney "Tha Commander" Branch	4:30
14.	"Deadicated" (featuring X-Con)	Lil ½ Dead; X-Con; Russell Brown; Russell Bates III	Tracy Kendrick; Courtney "Tha Commander" Branch; Clever Kisum; Russell "DJ Silk" Brown	5:23
Total length:				67:09

== Charts ==
Chart (1994)	Peak position
US Top R&B/Hip-Hop Albums (Billboard)	39
US Heatseekers Albums (Billboard)	17
